= Schweizer Seilbahninventar =

2011 heritage inventory of aerial cableways, funiculars and ski lifts in Switzerland

- Inventaire suisse des installations à câbles Inventario svizzero degli impianti a fune

Coverage
- Temporal: December 2010
- Spatial: Switzerland
- Included installations: aerial cableways, funiculars, ski lifts; notably aerial tramways, gondola lifts, chair lifts, material ropeways
- Excluded installations: mobile lifts; parts of residential, military or industrial buildings; elevators; no longer existing

Methodology
- Inventory categories: national importance, regional importance; recent noteworthy
- Basis: Federal Act on the nature and cultural heritage
- Cableway types: Swiss federal and cantonal legislation
- Evaluation criteria: concept, technology, architecture, authenticity, history, location, local infrastructure
- General methodology: ad hoc (Note: Erläuterungen (in German), Explications (in French), Informazioni (in Italian))

Inventory data
- Data: identifiers, general description, location, summary evaluation, detailed evaluation, technical data, years of components, images

Evaluation
- Mandated by: Federal Office of Culture
- Evaluators: Peter Bannwart, Thomas Batschelet, Erwin Bloch, Stefan Kraus, Brigitte Müller, Rudolf Saum, Karin Zaugg
- Advisory commission: FOT, EKD/CFMH, SBS, IKSS/CITT, GHK/SHAS
- On-site visits: 2009
- Selectivity: 129 of 2934 (175 evaluated in detail)

Publication
- Publication date: July 2011 (15 years ago)
- Languages: German; partially: French, Italian
- Publisher: Federal Office of Culture
- Forms: website, booklet
- Website: seilbahninventar.ch

Schweizer Seilbahninventar (also French: Inventaire suisse des installations à câbles, Italian: Inventario svizzero degli impianti a fune, literally Swiss Inventory of Cableways) was published in 2011 by the Federal Office of Culture. Of about 3000 cableways in Switzerland, the heritage inventory assesses 67 as of national importance and 44 as of regional importance in terms of the Swiss Federal Act on the nature and cultural heritage. It also includes 18 noteworthy more recent systems. Installations are included for their cultural or technological significance. The inventory covers aerial cableways (aerial tramways, gondola lifts, chair lifts, material ropeways), funiculars and ski lifts. Classifications applied are those of Swiss authorities. It does not cover inclined elevators, mobile lifts and installations part of residential, military or industrial building complexes.

== Project ==
Mandated by the Federal Office of Culture, the inventory was prepared by Karin Zaugg, Michael Gerber, Peter Bannwart, Thomas Batschelet, Erwin Bloch, Stefan Kraus, Brigitte Müller and Rudolf Saum. (Note: Impressum (in German), Impressum (in French), Colophon (in Italian))

They were advised by a commission from the following agencies and organisations:

- Federal Office of Transport BAV/OFT: Urs Wohlwend
- Federal Commission for Monument Preservation EKD/CFMH: Bernhard Furrer
- Verband Seilbahnen Schweiz/Remontées Mécaniques Suisses SBS: Anna Amacher Hoppler and Fulvio Sartori
- Interkantonales Konkordat für Seilbahnen und Skilifte/Concordat intercantonal sur les téléphériques et les téléskis IKSS/CITT: Reto Canale
- Society for Art History in Switzerland GSK/SHAS: Nina Mekacher

At the Federal Office of Culture, Oliver Martin was in charge of the project and Reto Müller of the publication

The project started in January 2008 and most onsite inspections took place in 2009. The inventory was completed in 2010 and aimed to reflect the state at end of 2010.

From the initial list of 2934 installations, 175 were evaluated in detail and 129 included in the published list.

All installations existed in 2010, but may not have been operational in years (Note: exemples: see funiculars) or have been dismantled since. (Note: notably Oberdorf–Weissenstein chairlift in 2013)

== Entries ==
Each entry includes:

- two identifiers:
  - an alphanumeric or numeric identifier. (Note: Examples: 61.019 for Giessbachbahn, BE-IK-3 Urweid – Chapf, X007 Standseilbahn Lochezen.)
  - a 5-digit identifier. (Note: Example: 40366 for Giessbachbahn)
- location
- the initials of the evaluators for the entry: on-site visit and inventorisation
- general description of the cableway
- summary evaluation
- detailed evaluation: concept, technology, architecture, authenticity, history, location, local infrastructure
- appendices:
  - technical data
  - years of components
  - other inventories/heritage registries
  - images

Each section of a cableway is generally included separately.

Cableways by type and importance
Type	National	Regional	Recent	Total
Aerial cableways	43	22	13	78
Funiculars	12	13	3	28
Skilifts	12	9	2	23
Total	67	44	18	129

Cableways by canton and importance
Canton	National	Regional	Recent	Total
Bern	18	8	2	28
Valais	10	5	5	20
Ticino	6	5	1	12
Graubünden	8	2	1	11
Nidwalden	7	2	1	10
Glarus	4	3	2	9
Schwyz	3	4	1	8
Vaud	3	2	-	5
St. Gallen	1	3	1	5
Uri	-	5	-	5
other (Note: The 8 cantons with 3, 2 or 1 installations: Fribourg, Lucerne, Obwalden, Zürich, Solothurn, Aargau, Neuchâtel, Appenzell Innerrhoden. There are none in another 8 cantons.)	7	5	4	16
Total	67	44	18	129

== Funiculars ==
Of the 129 cableways, 28 are funiculars.

=== Funiculars of national importance ===
Twelve funiculars are considered of national importance, these are:

Operating in 2022:

- Giessbachbahn
- Handegg – Gelmersee
- Interlaken – Heimwehfluh
- Reichenbachfallbahn
- Neuveville – St-Pierre (Fribourg)
- Kehrsiten – Bürgenstock
- Stans – Kälti
- Locarno – Madonna del Sasso
- Les Avants – Sonloup

Others:

- Lugano Angioli, closed 4 October 1986 (39 years ago)
- Harissenbucht (Stansstad) – Fürigen, closed 31 October 2005 (20 years ago)
- Le Châtelard VS – Les Montuires, closed in 2022

=== Funiculars of regional importance ===
13 of regional importance consists of:

- Kriens – Sonnenberg
- Lugano Paradiso – M. San Salvatore
- Treib – Seelisberg
- Niesenbahn (2 sections)
- Monté Bré (2 sections)

The sections are included separately.

Also the following not built for commercial transport of persons:

- Handegg – Handeggfluh
- Piotta – Ritom
- Urweid – Chapf
- Lochezen
- Schiebuwaldji
- Bootstransportbahn Rupperswil-Auenstein

=== Recent funiculars ===
3 recent funiculars were included:

- Université de Neuchâtel - Gare CFF, Fun'Ambule
- Sierre - Montana-Crans
- Airside-Center - Dock-E (Skymetro)

== Editions ==
The inventory is published online. The public version only lists the installations of importance (129). A summary booklet was published in print and as pdf. The German original was partially translated into French and Italian and prefaced by Jean-Frédéric Jauslin of the Federal Office of Culture.

The online version includes a history of cableways in Switzerland by Karin Zaugg, Seilbahnen in der Schweiz. Hintergrund.

The website was conceived to be editable. As of April 2023, year on "impressum" is 2011.

== Use ==
The inventory is meant to guide the federal and cantonal agencies (notably Federal Office of Transport and the IKSS/CITT office) when delivering concessions for the infrastructure.

A review published in 2018 found that a large part of the installations had ceased operation or continued operation was endangered. A detailed overview for aerial cableways was included.

Aerial cableways in 2018
Operational status	National	Regional	Recent	Total
red (dismantled or ceased operation)	9	7		16
orange (operation unclear or endangered)	8	3		11
green (operational)	26	12	13	51
Total	43	22	13	78

The canton of Nidwalden took it in account when elaborating its 2019 strategy on cableways.

== Notes ==
Locations in work, editions
