= Standseilbahn Handegg–Wasserschloss Handeggfluh Ärlen =

Former funicular of Grimsel hydro-electric plant in the canton of Bern, Switzerland

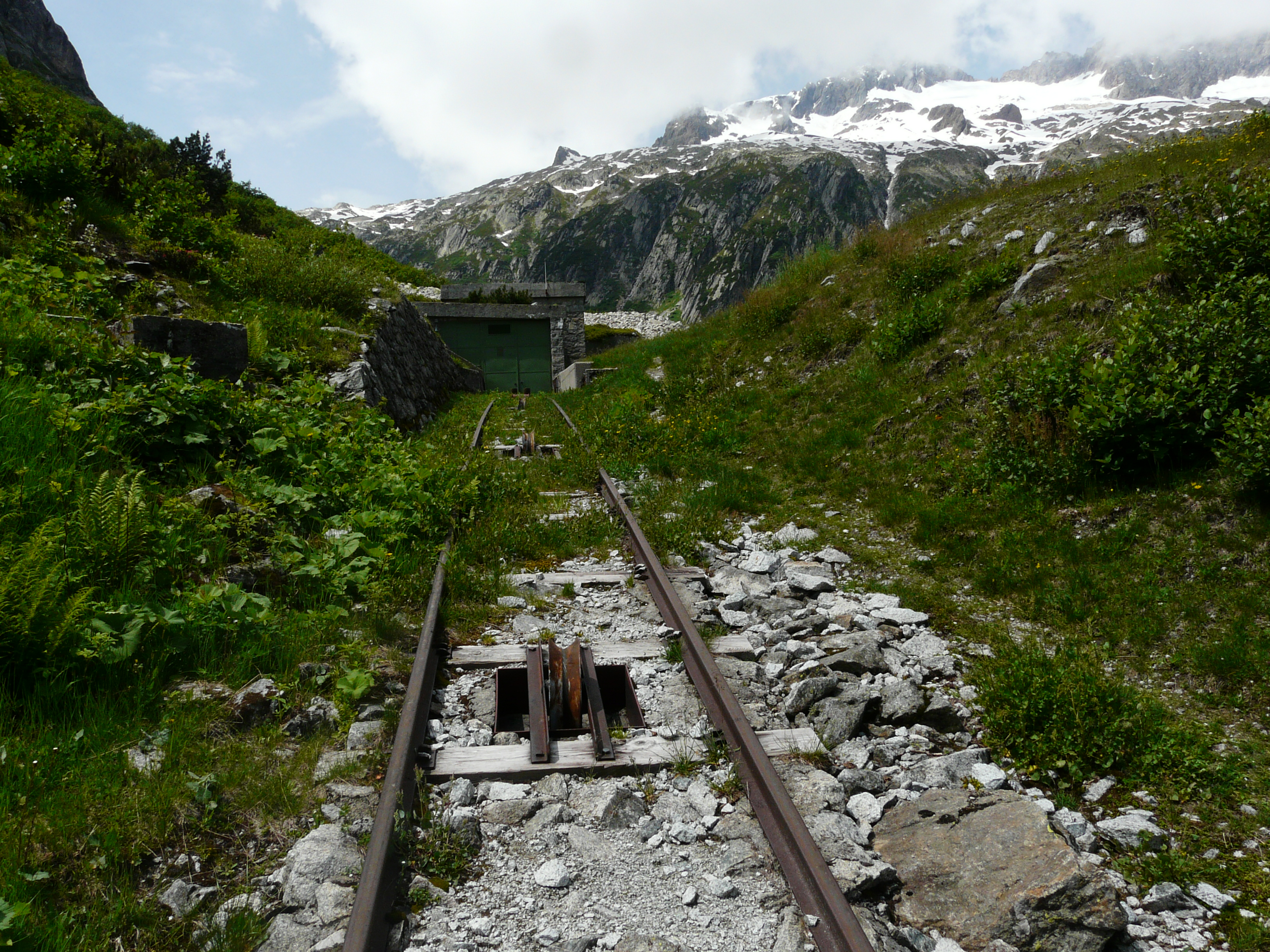
- upper station (2013)

Overview
- Other names: Standseilbahn Handegg–Handeggfluh; Ärlenbahn; KWO Erlenbahn
- Status: ceased operation
- Owner: Kraftwerke Oberhasli AG
- Locale: Guttannen, Canton of Bern, Switzerland
- Coordinates: 46.61219°N 8.30179°E
- Termini: Handeck (46.612722°N 8.306471°E); "Wasserschloss Handeggfluh Ärlen" (46.611661°N 8.296551°E )
- Stations: 2

Service
- Type: Funicular
- Operator(s): Kraftwerke Oberhasli AG
- Rolling stock: 1 for 20 persons

History
- Opened: 1948
- Enhancements: 1973
- End transport of persons: 2013
- Closed: 2015 (11 years ago)

Technical
- Line length: 867 m (2,844 ft)
- Number of tracks: 1
- Electrification: from opening
- Highest elevation: 1,680 m (5,510 ft)

Standseilbahn Handegg–Wasserschloss Handeggfluh Ärlen was one of the funiculars of Kraftwerke Oberhasli built for its hydroelectric plants at Grimsel, in the canton of Bern, Switzerland. It led from Handeck (or Handegg) at 1410 m (Note: notes 1414 m) to Handeckfluh Erlen (or Handeggfluh Ärlen) at 1680 m, on the side of the Hasli valley opposite of Gelmerbahn. The line had a length of 867 m and a difference of elevation of 270 m.

== Background ==
Built in 1948 for Kraftwerk Handegg II, it had a single car operated by an electric winch.

The funicular was considered of regional importance in Schweizer Seilbahninventar, the heritage inventory of Swiss cableways of 2011, among others due to its preserved original state.

The autorisation for transport of people was cancelled in 2013. The funicular ceased transport of goods in 2015.
