= First Battle of Ulrichen =

Battle in 1211 in Switzerland

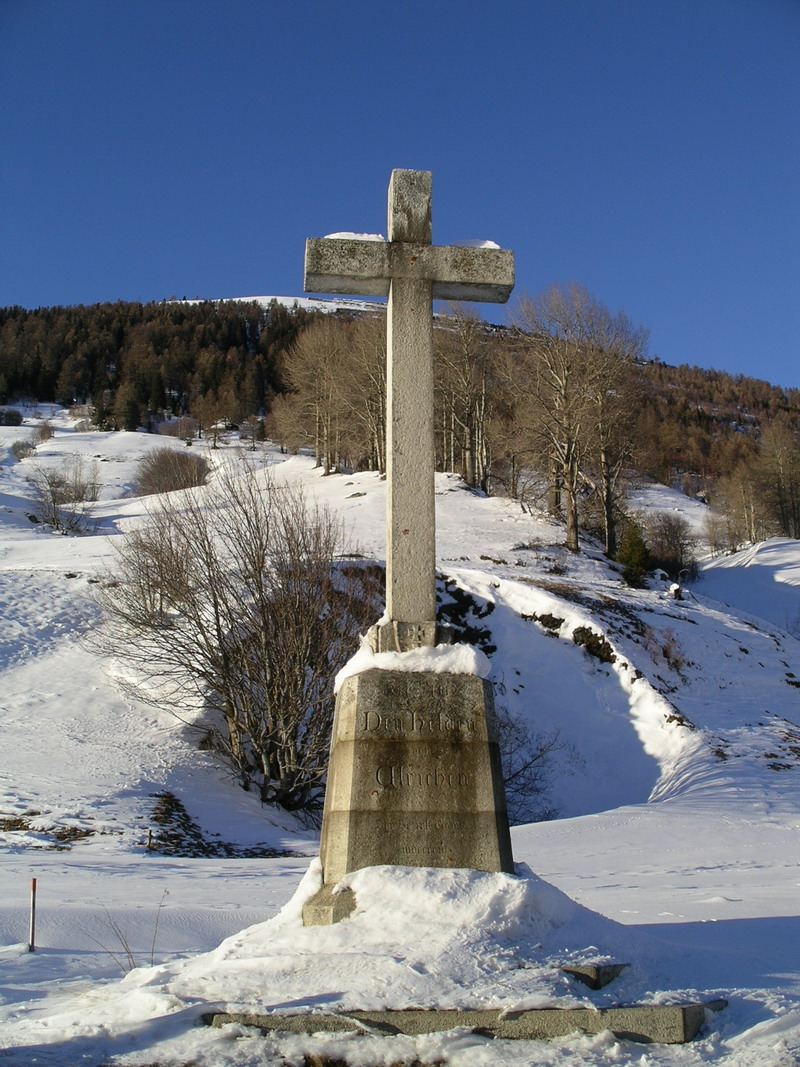
Date	1211
Location	Ulrichen, Valais 46.511589°N 8.314116°E
Result	Decisive Valais victory

Belligerents
Bern	Valais

Commanders and leaders
Berthold V, Duke of Zähringen	Landrich von Mont

Strength
13,000	Unknown
- Location within Switzerland

The First Battle of Ulrichen in 1211 was a decisive defeat of Bernese troops under Duke Berthold V of Zähringen by the army of the Canton of Valais under the Bishop of Sion Landrich von Mont. The battle took place near Ulrichen which is now part of Obergoms. Many details about the battle are uncertain or questioned by historians.

== History ==
Twenty years before the battle, in 1191, Berchtold V had established the city of Bern to expand his power into the lands of the County of Savoy. By 1211 he had quarreled with Thomas of Savoy and determined to use the new city as a base to expand into the Canton of Valais. Assembling an army of about 13,000 men he marched over the Grimsel pass. As they descended from the pass they burnt Oberwald and Obergesteln villages. The Valaisian army assembled under the command of the Bishop of Sion Landrich von Mont near Ulrichen.

Very little is recorded about the battle, but Berchtold's army suffered heavy casualties and the survivors retreated back over the Grimsel pass. They were closely followed by the victorious Valaisian army. At a small lake in the pass, Berchtold's army paused and attempted to rally the retreating soldiers. However, the Valaiser army fell on the survivors and destroyed most of the remaining soldiers. The lake is now known as Totensee or Lake of the Dead due to the slaughter that happened on the lake shore.

== Impact ==
Berchtold's defeat at Ulrichen ended his expansion into the Canton of Valais. Over 200 years later, in 1419 during the Raron affair, a Bernese army crossed the Grimsel pass to support the claims of the Counts of Raron. According to tradition, Thomas [Brantschen] or [Riedie] a resident of Ulrichen, saw the invading army and declared;

What has become of Valais, the ancient hero-land? Did not our fathers formerly defeat the duke of Zähringen in a bloody battle near Ulrichen? Let us once again conquer her for the fatherland and our ancient liberty, or die a glorious death.

— Quoted by Heinrich Zschokke, The History of Switzerland, for the Swiss People

He then led 400 to 600 men against a Bernese army and defeated them, though he died in the process. Whether Thomas actually existed is uncertain since the first records of his attack are from over a century later. However, the two battles of Ulrichen and Thomas' attack are an important theme in Valaisian literature and folklore.

Today there is a large granite cross on the supposed site of the battle.

== See also ==
- Battles of the Old Swiss Confederacy
