= Standseilbahn Urweid–Chapf =

Funicular of Grimsel hydro-electric plant in the canton of Bern, Switzerland

Overview
- Other names: Chapfbahn; Standseilbahn Urweid–Kapf; Standseilbahn Urweid–Wasserschloss
- Owner: Kraftwerke Oberhasli AG
- Locale: Innertkirchen, Canton of Bern, Switzerland
- Coordinates: 46.6885°N 8.2497°E
- Termini: Urweid (46.687930°N 8.244570°E); Chapf (46.688940°N 8.254710°E)
- Stations: 4

Service
- Type: Funicular
- Operator(s): Kraftwerke Oberhasli AG
- Rolling stock: 1

History
- Opened: 1 May 1940 (85 years ago)
- Enhancements: 2005

Technical
- Line length: 1,030 m (3,380 ft)
- Number of tracks: 1
- Track gauge: 1,000 mm (3 ft 3 3/8 in)
- Electrification: from opening

Standseilbahn Urweid–Chapf is one of the funiculars of Kraftwerke Oberhasli built for its hydroelectric plants at Grimsel, in the canton of Bern, Switzerland. It leads from Üssri Urweid at 717 m to Chapf (or Wasserschloss Kapf) at 1320 m. The line has a length of 1030 m (Note: Length found in sources: 996 m, 973 m) with a difference of elevation of 608 m (Note: Difference of elevation also stated as 603 m) and a maximum slope of 100%. The funicular has a single car for up to 12 persons and is operated by an electric winch at the upper station.

== History ==
The funicular was built by Kraftwerke Oberhasli in 1940 at the construction of Kraftwerk Innertkirchen I (1939-1943), the first expansion of its Grimsel plant.

It was considered of regional importance in Schweizer Seilbahninventar, the heritage inventory of Swiss cableways of 2011, among others due to the substantive parts preserved in its original state and its continued use.
