= Handeck =

Village in the municipality of Guttannen, Bernese Oberland, Switzerland

Handeck Handegg
- Village
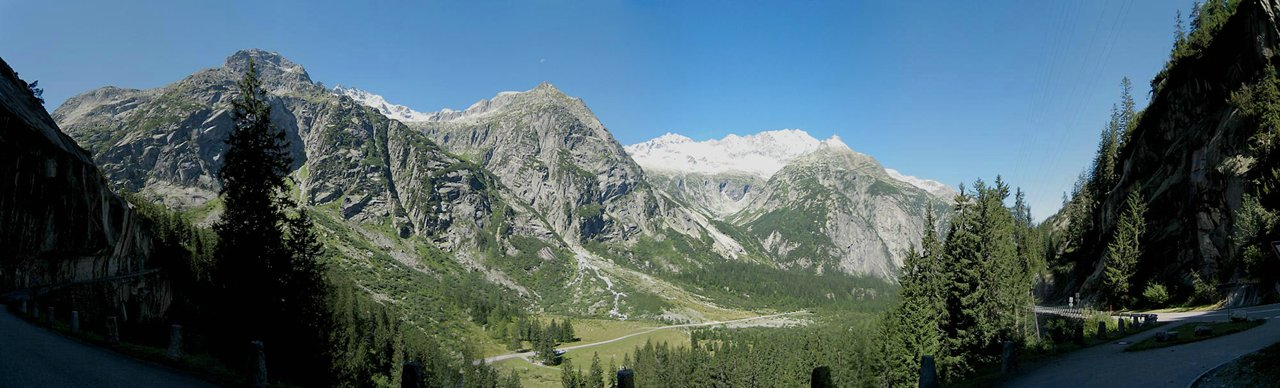
- Grimsel Pass road to Handeck
- Interactive map of Handeck
- Coordinates: 46°37′N 8°18′E
- Country: Switzerland
- Canton: Bern
- District: Interlaken-Oberhasli
- Municipality: Guttannen
- Elevation: 1,423 m (4,669 ft)

Handeck (also spelled Handegg) is a village on the Grimsel pass road in the municipality of Guttannen, Switzerland. The village is located near the lake Gelmersee, which may be reached by Gelmerbahn from Handeck. There is a hotel and bridge at the village.

== Geography ==
Handeck is located approximately 75 kilometres (47 mi) east of Bern and 63 km (39 mi) northwest of Locarno. The trail is primarily used for hiking and walking. It has an elevation of 1,423 meters. The road to Grimsel Pass summit goes right by a pair of short tunnels to Handeck.

== Places ==
Handeck has a hotel and a bridge named "Suspension Bridge". There is also a chalet, the first-halting place, which is beautiful. The village's waterfall cascade surpasses all others in Switzerland.

== Culture ==
Part of the permanent collection at the Cleveland Museum of Art is an oil painting by French painter Jean-Léon Gérôme which depicts the beauty of this locale still today, as it was during his world travels in the 1850s.

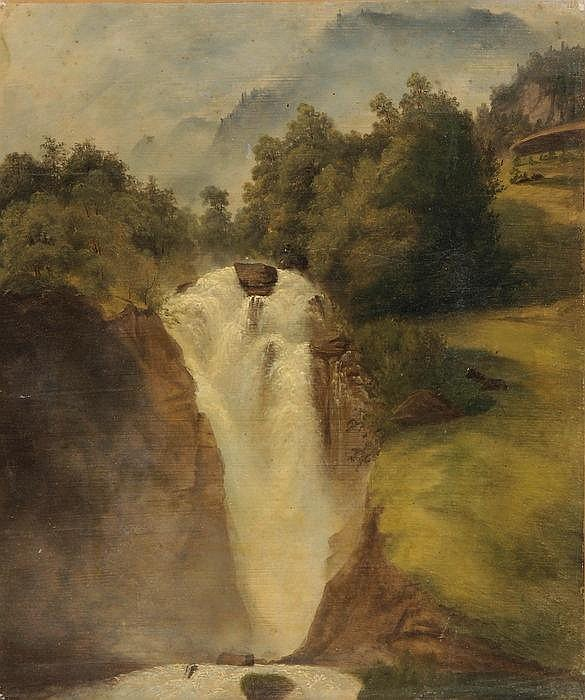
Handeck-Wasserfall by Alexandre Calame (19th century)

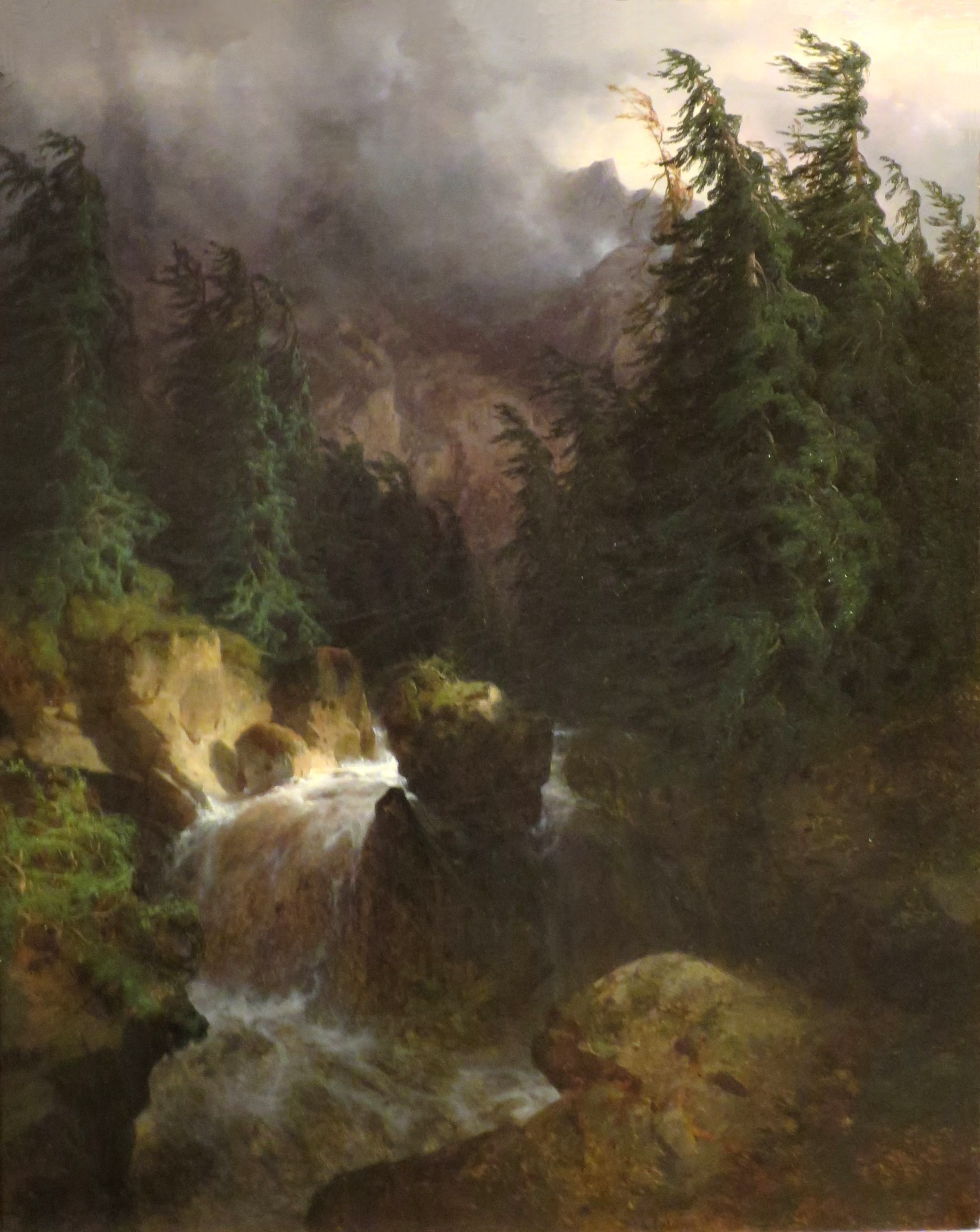
Souvenir of Handeck by Alexandre Calame (1851)

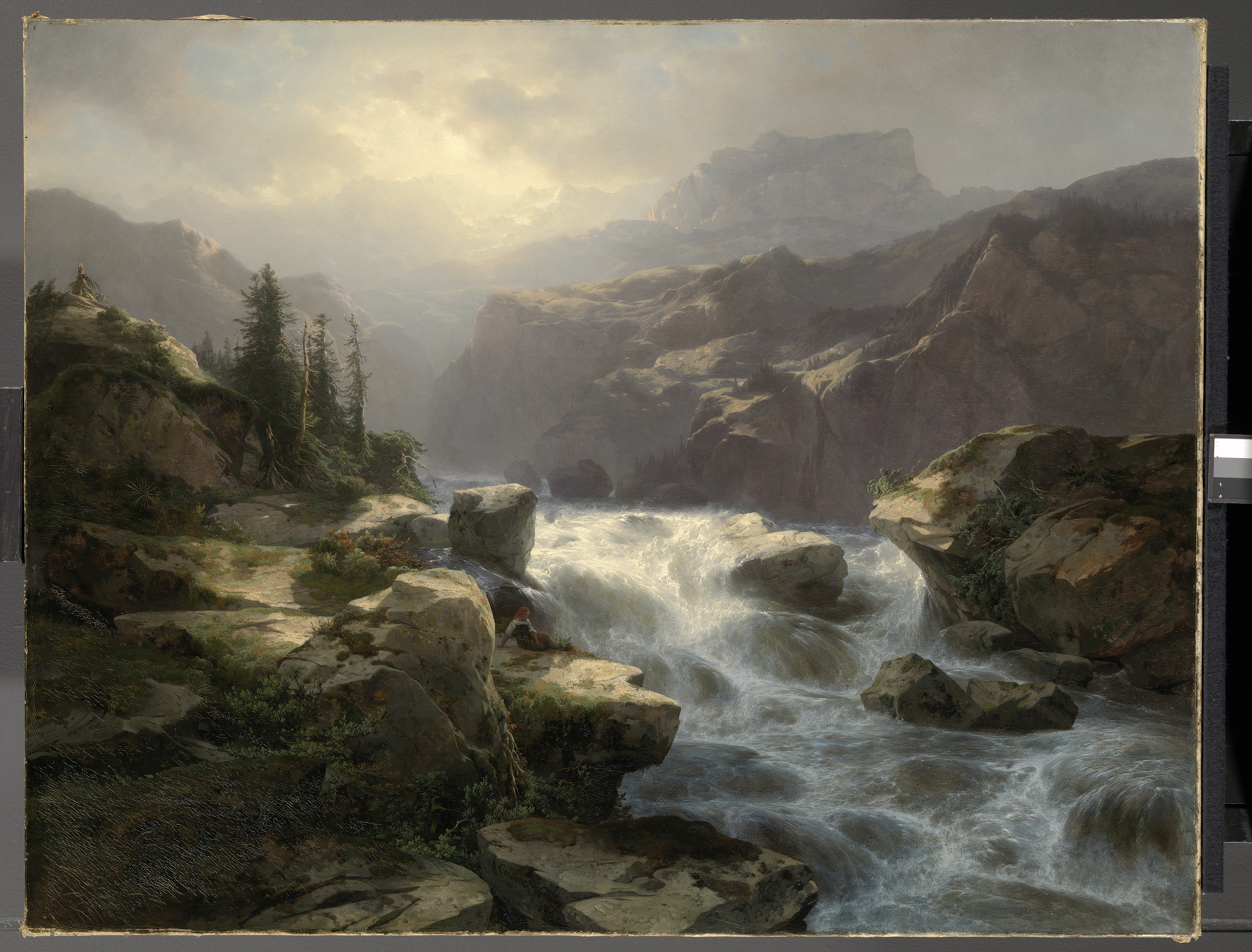
Waterval van de Handeck aan de Grimsel by Alexandre Calame (19th century)

== See also ==
- Standseilbahn Handegg–Wasserschloss Handeggfluh Ärlen
