= Gelmersee =

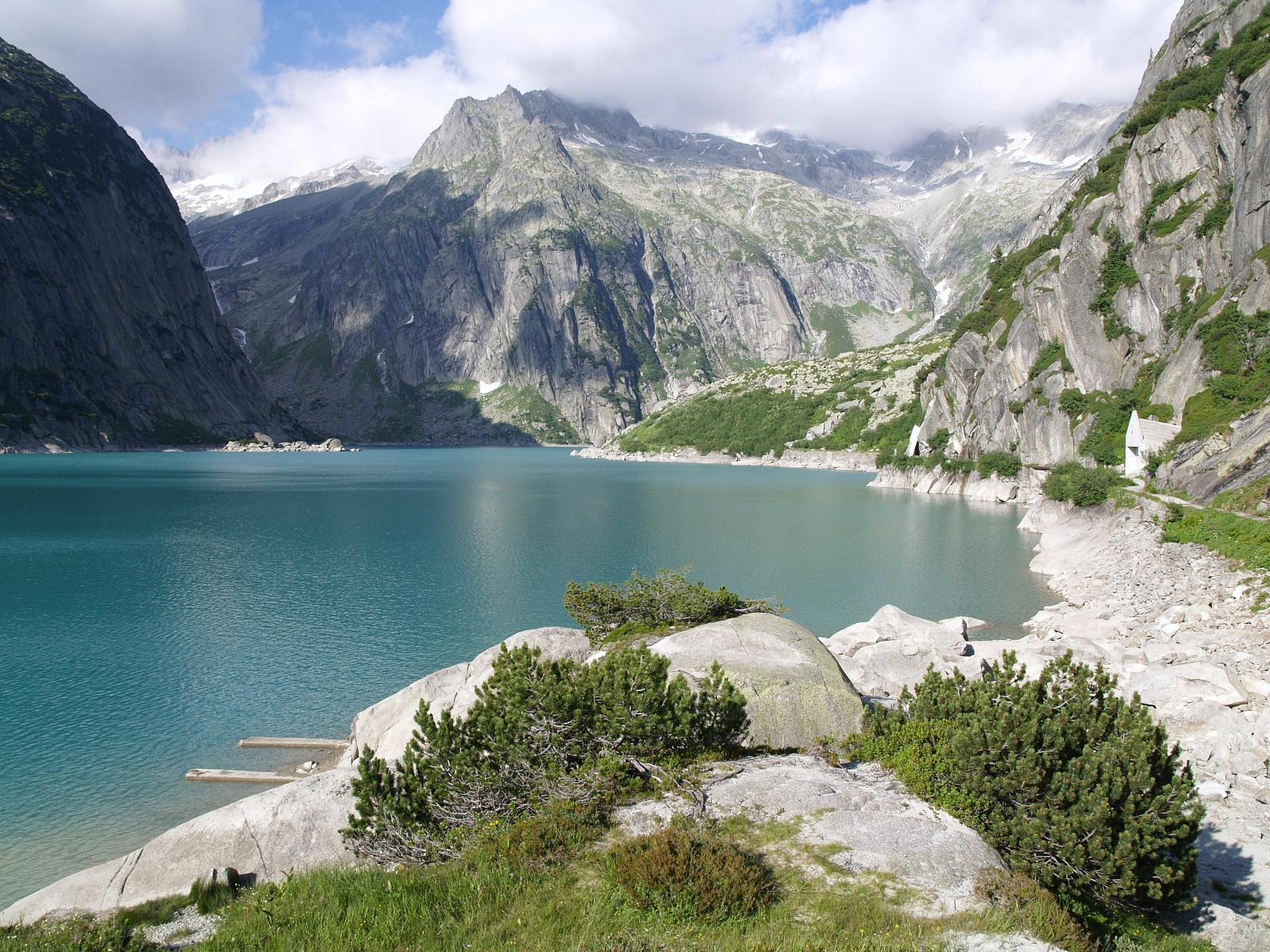

- Location within Canton of Bern Location within Switzerland Location within Alps
- Interactive map of Gelmersee
- Location: Grimsel, Bernese Oberland
- Coordinates: 46°36′58″N 8°19′56″E
- Type: reservoir
- Catchment area: 16.0 km^{2} (6.2 sq mi)
- Basin countries: Switzerland
- Surface area: 0.645 km^{2} (0.249 sq mi)
- Max. depth: 48 m (157 ft)
- Water volume: 13 million cubic metres (11,000 acre⋅ft)
- Surface elevation: 1,850 m (6,070 ft)

Gelmersee (or Lake Gelmer) is a reservoir in Bernese Oberland, Switzerland. The hydroelectric reservoir was completed in 1932, at about the same time as the Grimselsee reservoir, and both are operated by Kraftwerke Oberhasli. The reservoir's volume is 13 million cubic metres (460×10^{6} cu ft) and its surface area 64.5 ha (159 acres).

The reservoir may be reached by the Gelmerbahn from Handegg, Guttannen at 1,412 m (4,633 ft). The funicular's track with a length of 1,028 m (3,373 ft) has a maximum inclination of 106%.

== See also ==
- List of lakes of Switzerland
- List of mountain lakes of Switzerland
