= Grimselsee =

Artificial lake in the Canton of Bern, Switzerland

Grimselsee Lake Grimsel
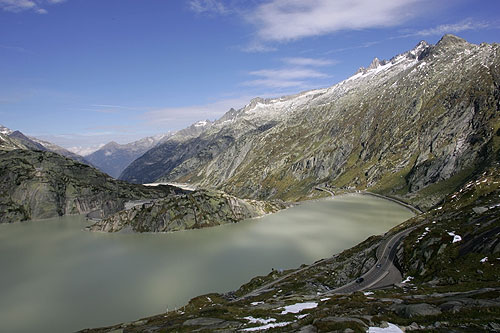

- Location within Canton of Bern Location within Switzerland Location within Alps
- Interactive map of Grimselsee; Lake Grimsel
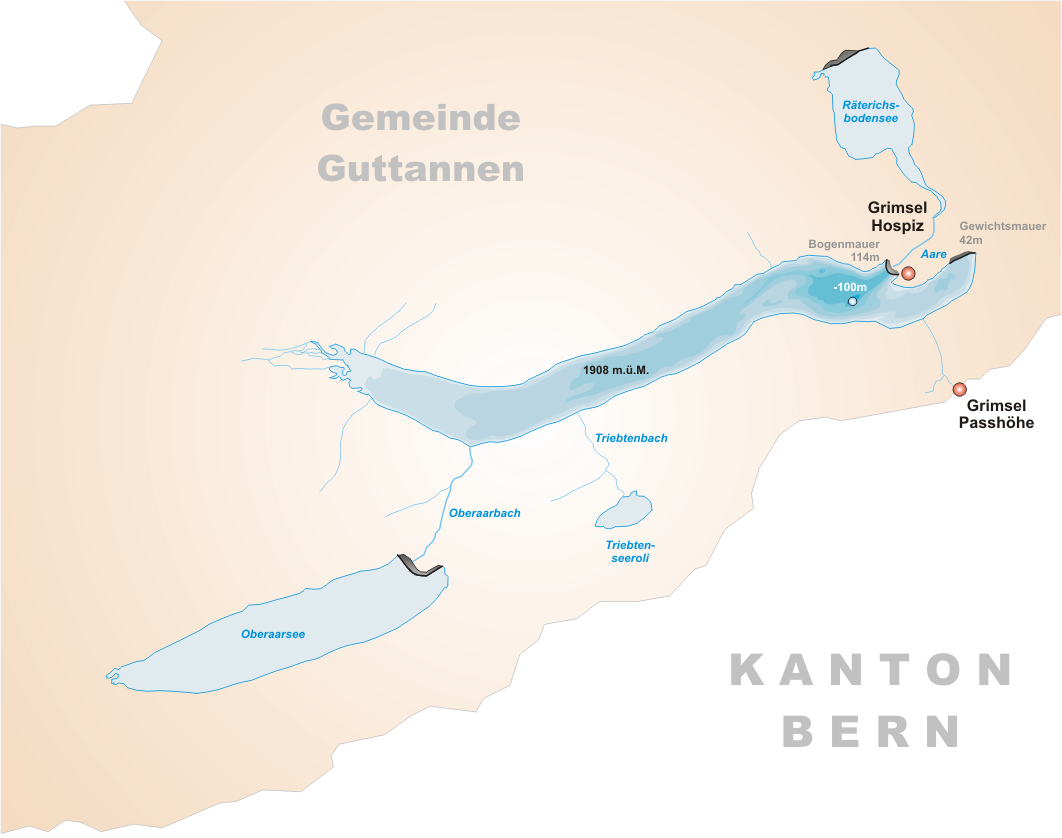
- Location: Guttannen, Canton of Bern
- Coordinates: 46°34′3″N 8°18′27″E
- Type: artificial lake, hydroelectric reservoir
- Primary inflows: Oberaarbach, Treibtenbach
- Primary outflows: Aare
- Catchment area: 74.4 km^{2} (28.7 sq mi)
- Basin countries: Switzerland
- Surface area: 2.63 km^{2} (1.02 sq mi)
- Water volume: 95 million cubic metres (77,000 acre⋅ft)
- Surface elevation: 1,908 m (6,260 ft)

The Grimselsee or Lake Grimsel is an artificial lake near the Grimsel Pass in the Canton of Bern, Switzerland. With a volume of 95 million m^{3} (21 billion imperial gallons, 25 billion US gallons), it is larger than other hydroelectric reservoirs in the Aare headwaters region: Oberaarsee, Räterichsbodensee and Gelmersee. The dam was completed in 1932 and is operated by Kraftwerke Oberhasli AG (KWO). It is located in the municipality of Guttannen.

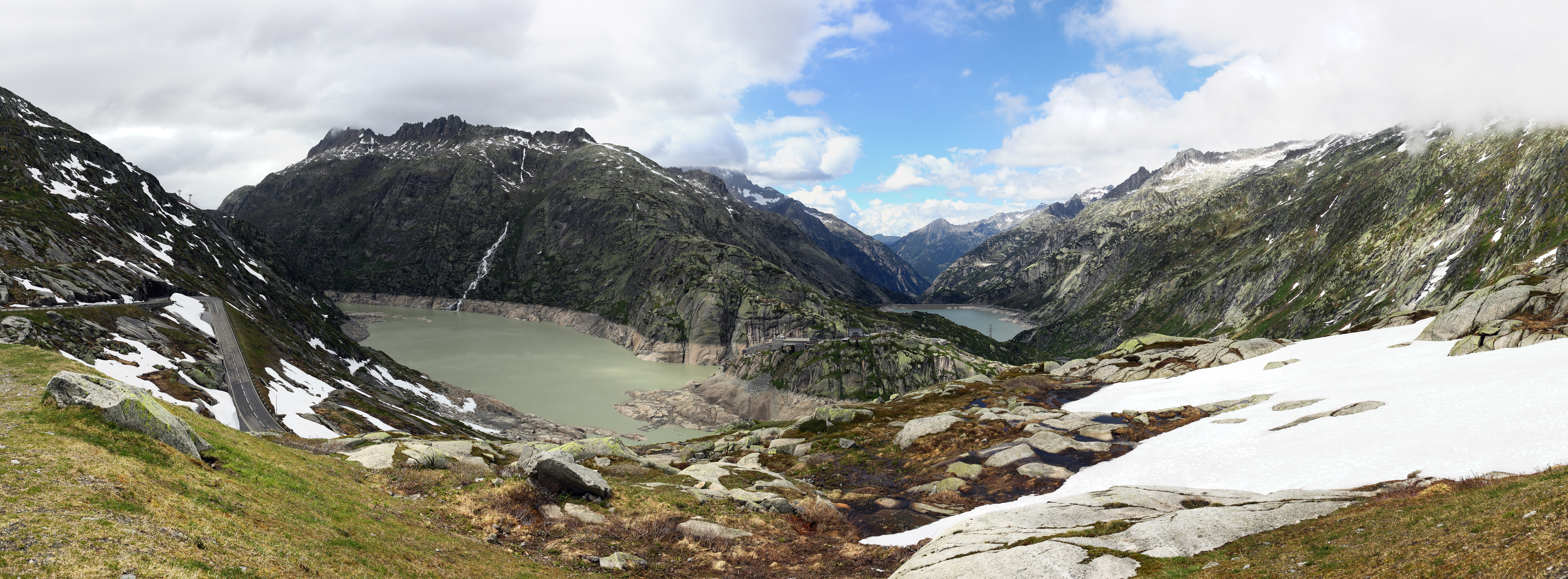
Lake Grimsel and Räterichsbodensee in the background

== Climate ==
Climate data for Grimselsee (Grimsel Hospiz), elevation 1,980 m (6,500 ft), (1991–2020)
Month	Jan	Feb	Mar	Apr	May	Jun	Jul	Aug	Sep	Oct	Nov	Dec	Year
Mean daily maximum °C (°F)	−1.8 (28.8)	−2.0 (28.4)	0.3 (32.5)	3.0 (37.4)	7.3 (45.1)	11.4 (52.5)	13.2 (55.8)	13.3 (55.9)	9.7 (49.5)	6.8 (44.2)	1.7 (35.1)	−0.9 (30.4)	5.2 (41.4)
Daily mean °C (°F)	−4.5 (23.9)	−4.9 (23.2)	−2.6 (27.3)	0.2 (32.4)	4.3 (39.7)	8.2 (46.8)	10.2 (50.4)	10.3 (50.5)	6.9 (44.4)	4.0 (39.2)	−0.7 (30.7)	−3.5 (25.7)	2.3 (36.1)
Mean daily minimum °C (°F)	−7.4 (18.7)	−7.9 (17.8)	−5.5 (22.1)	−2.7 (27.1)	1.3 (34.3)	4.9 (40.8)	7.0 (44.6)	7.3 (45.1)	4.2 (39.6)	1.4 (34.5)	−3.1 (26.4)	−6.2 (20.8)	−0.6 (30.9)
Average precipitation mm (inches)	190.1 (7.48)	163.2 (6.43)	169.1 (6.66)	150.2 (5.91)	158.6 (6.24)	127.3 (5.01)	126.3 (4.97)	139.4 (5.49)	128.6 (5.06)	129.3 (5.09)	167.8 (6.61)	184.1 (7.25)	1,834 (72.20)
Average snowfall cm (inches)	203.9 (80.3)	192.7 (75.9)	202.3 (79.6)	151.4 (59.6)	74.9 (29.5)	21.7 (8.5)	3.3 (1.3)	5.2 (2.0)	21.3 (8.4)	53.8 (21.2)	149.5 (58.9)	179.6 (70.7)	1,259.6 (495.9)
Average precipitation days (≥ 1.0 mm)	12.1	11.8	13.2	12.5	13.9	14.6	13.4	13.8	11.3	10.8	11.6	12.7	151.7
Average relative humidity (%)	65.9	68.2	73.1	75.6	74.6	76.1	75.3	75.8	75.6	70.0	71.3	66.6	72.3
Mean monthly sunshine hours	71.6	95.2	128.7	123.0	135.3	185.2	177.7	169.1	139.8	114.9	64.1	57.0	1,434.6
Source: NOAA

== See also ==
- List of lakes of Switzerland
- List of mountain lakes of Switzerland
