= Standseilbahn Lochezen =

Funicular of quarry at Lake Walensee, Switzerland

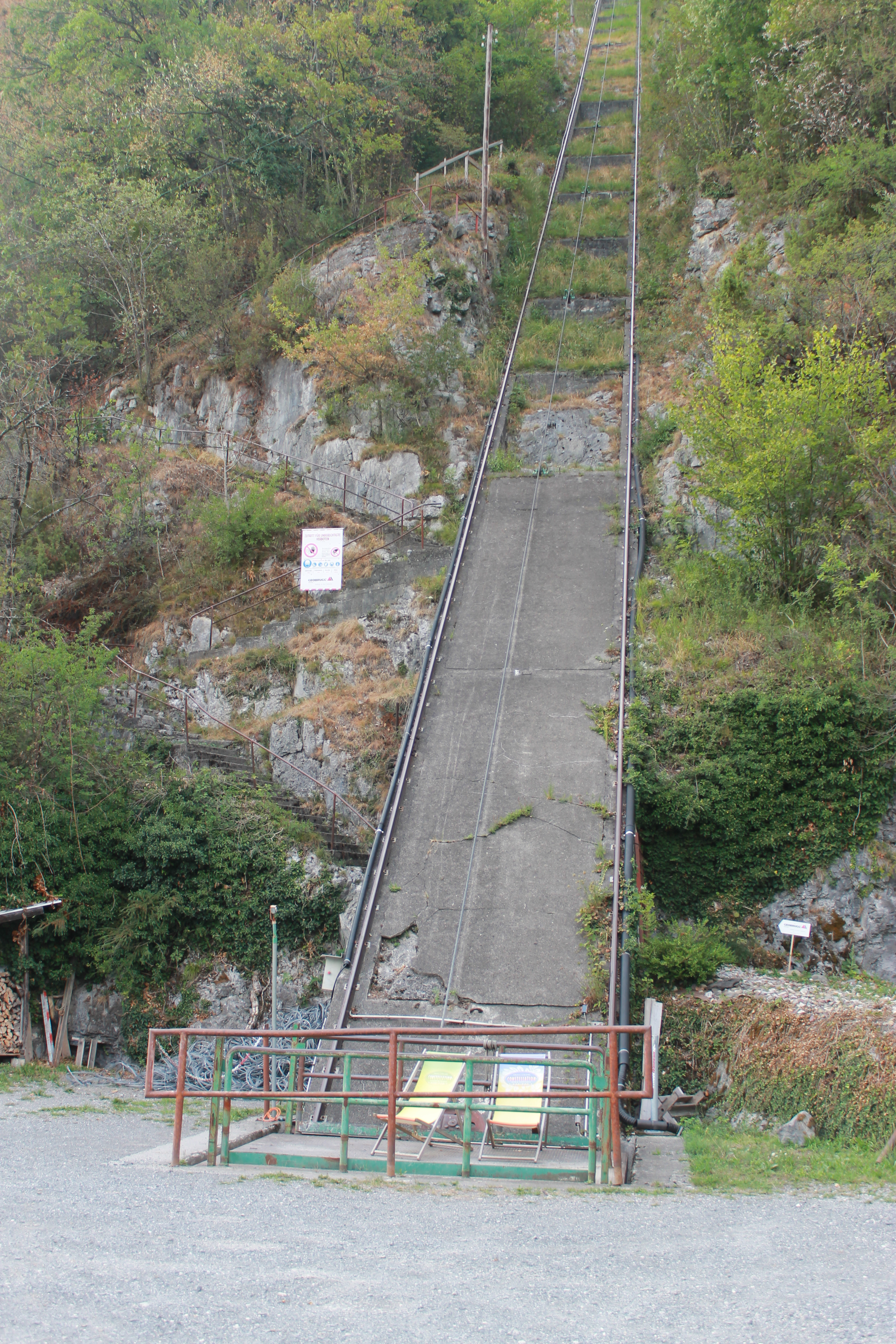
- The lower station in 2018

Overview
- Status: In operation
- Locale: Walenstadt; Canton of St. Gallen; Switzerland

Service
- Type: industrial funicular (inclined lift)
- Operator(s): See Kies AG (in 2001); Cement- und Kalkfabrik Unterterzen A.G. (1956–1995)
- Rolling stock: 1

History
- Opened: 1956 (69 years ago)

Technical
- Line length: 240 m (790 ft)
- Number of tracks: 1
- Track gauge: 2970 mm (about 9 ft 10 1/8 in)
- Electrification: from opening
- Maximum incline: 89%

Standseilbahn Lochezen is an inclined lift at Lochezen, east of Quinten, in the canton of St. Gallen, Switzerland. It was built in 1956 to provide access from the shore of Walensee at 425 metres (1,394 ft) to the limestone quarry at an elevation of 575 metres (1,886 ft).

With a length of ca. 200 m (660 ft) (Note: Stated length varies: have 240 m (790 ft), 218 m (715 ft)), the lift climbs a difference of elevation of 150 m (490 ft) (Note: Stated difference of elevation varies: have 150 m (490 ft), 160 m (520 ft)) at an incline of 89%. The open platform is pulled by a winch above the upper station.

In 2011, the installation was included as a funicular of regional interest in the Swiss heritage registry of cableways, Schweizer Seilbahninventar, for its mostly original state and importance to the site for which it was built.

== Quarry ==
The Lochezen quarry was exploited by Cement- und Kalkfabrik Unterterzen A.G. in 1956, later by See Kies AG. After closure of the quarry, the site was used for testing by Geobrugg AG.

== See also ==
- List of funiculars in Switzerland
- List of heritage railways and funiculars in Switzerland
