= Kraftwerke Oberhasli =

Swiss energy supply company

Kraftwerke Oberhasli AG
- Industry: Energy supply
- Founded: 1925
- Headquarters: Switzerland
- Website: http://www.grimselstrom.ch/

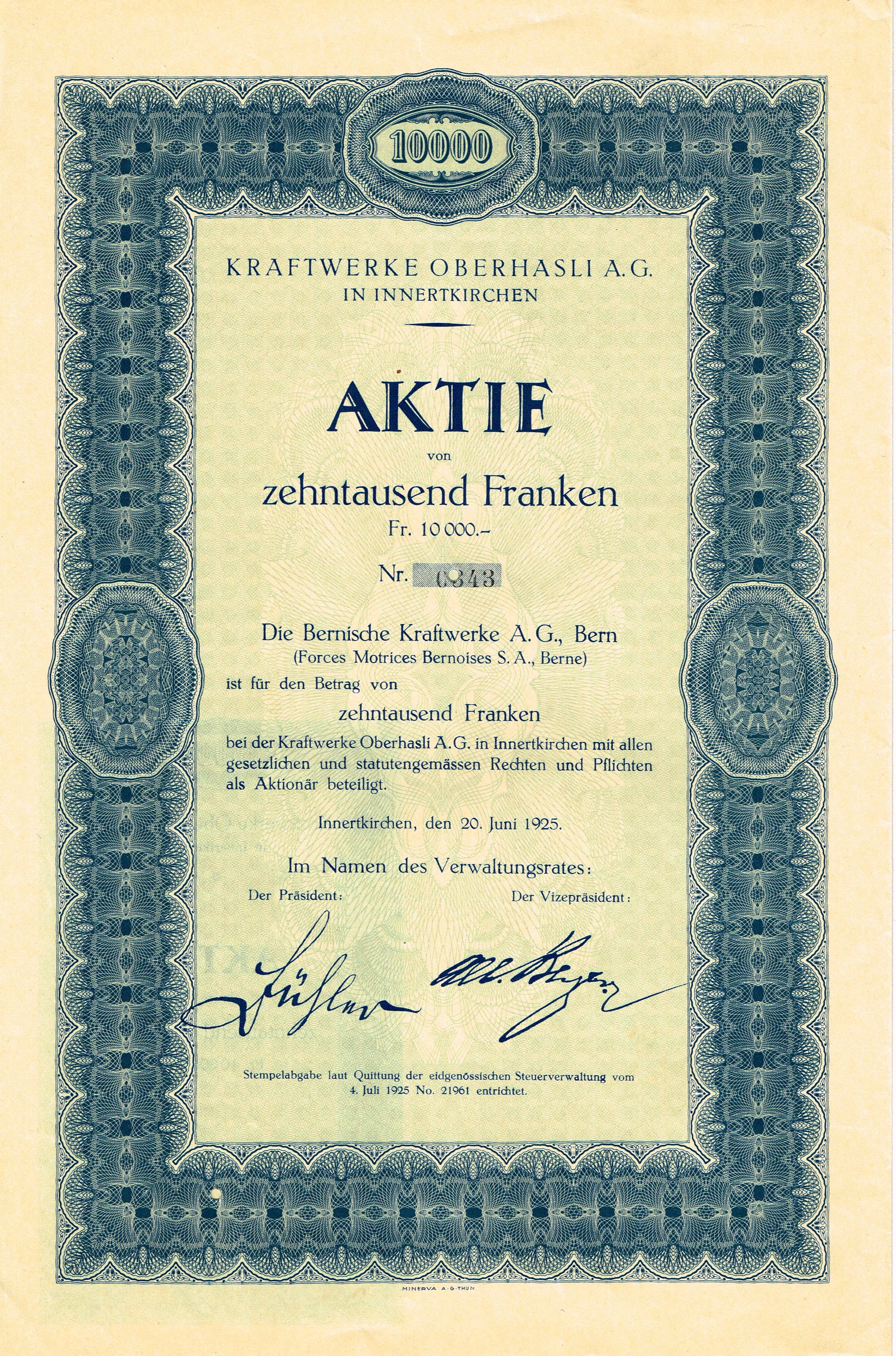
Share of the Kraftwerke Oberhasli AG, issued 20. June 1925

Kraftwerke Oberhasli AG (KWO) is a Swiss energy supply company, based in Innertkirchen (BE) and operating several hydroelectric plants in the Oberhasli area of the canton of Bern. It also operates a number of tourist attractions in the same area, mostly with some relationship to its energy supply business. It uses the brands Grimselstrom and Grimselwelt, the latter specifically for its tourism ventures. Both brands are named after the Grimsel Pass that forms the upper end of its operating area.

Founded in 1925, the company had its first power plant, Handeck 1, online by 1932. Currently, KWO is operating nine plants, fed by the reservoirs of Grimselsee, Oberaarsee, Räterichsbodensee, Gelmersee and Totensee, with a total of 26 turbines giving a total maximum power output of 1.125 Gigawatts. The company produces around 2,350 Gigawatt hours of electricity annually, which represents about 7% of the country's total hydroelectric energy production.

The Handeckfluh small power plant is to utilize the previously unused gradient between Mattenalpsee and the Handeckfluh moated castle. With an investment of 22.5 million SFr., a completely underground plant with a capacity of 10 MW can be built, which would produce 24 GWh annually. The application for the construction permit was submitted in 2017.

The company also owns the Meiringen–Innertkirchen railway, the Gelmerbahn funicular, and the Sidelhornbahn, Triftbahn and Tällibahn aerial lifts. All of these were originally built to assist the construction and maintenance of its hydroelectric plants, but now provide transport for local residents and/or tourists. Additionally the Kraftwerke Oberhasli operates and maintains the Reichenbachfall Funicular, although this is owned by the neighbouring EWR Energie company. Standseilbahn Handegg–Wasserschloss Handeggfluh Ärlen was operated 1948 to 2015. Standseilbahn Urweid–Chapf has been operated since 1940, but not opened to the public.

KWO employs 530 people, or a total of 364 full-time jobs.
