= Totesee =

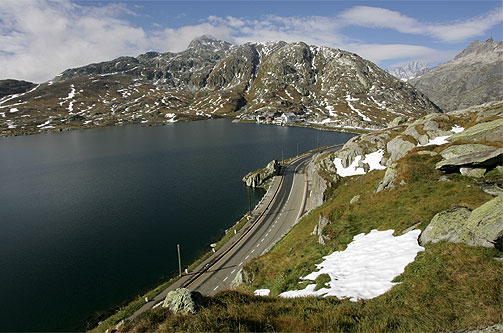

- Location within Canton of Valais Location within Canton of Bern Location within Switzerland Location within Alps
- Interactive map of Totesee
- Location: Grimsel Pass, Valais
- Coordinates: 46°33′37.05″N 8°20′22.91″E
- Type: natural lake, reservoir
- Basin countries: Switzerland
- Surface area: 18 ha (44 acres)
- Max. depth: 34 m (112 ft)
- Water volume: 2.5 million cubic metres (2,000 acre⋅ft)
- Surface elevation: 2,160 m (7,090 ft)

Totesee (Germanized: Totensee) is a small natural lake (18 ha or 44 acres) at the Grimsel Pass in Switzerland. The lake lies immediately to the south of the natural watershed and cantonal boundary at the pass. It is therefore in the canton of Valais, and it would naturally drain into the river Rhône in the valley below. However a dam has been constructed to enable its use as a reservoir, increasing its size and raising its level by 16 metres (52 ft). As part of this work, an aqueduct supplies water to the Grimselsee, which drains into the river Aare and thus forms part of the Rhine catchment.

In November 2006, the lake's entire trout population died, possibly due to algae.

The name Totensee (also: Lake Toten, literally "Lake of the Dead") is said to be derived from soldiers of Duke Berchtold V of Zähringen driven into the lake by the people of Valais after the Battle of Ulrichen in 1211.

== See also ==
- List of mountain lakes of Switzerland
