= Gelmerbahn =

Cable railway in Switzerland

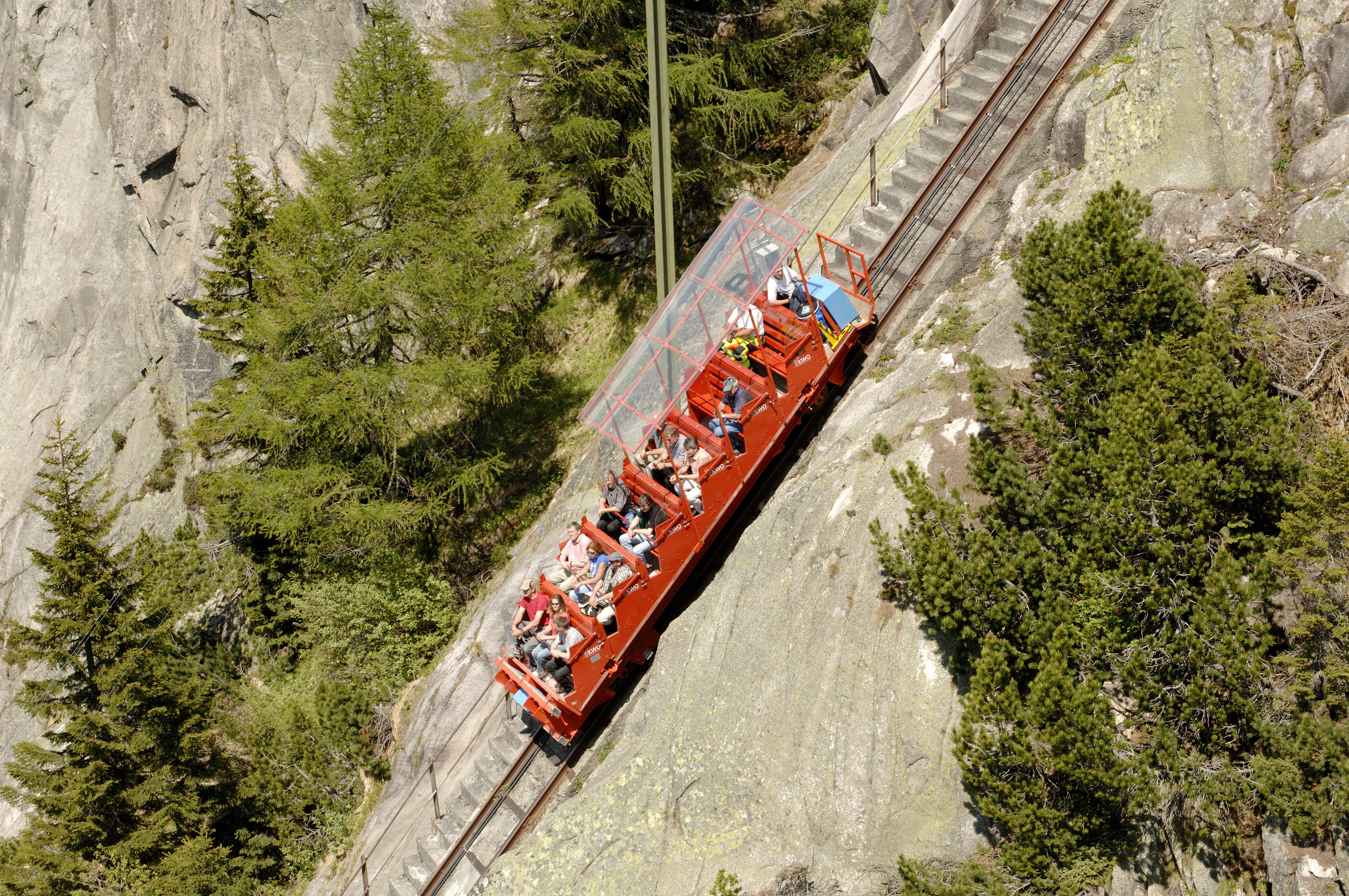
- Car on the steepest part of the line

Overview
- Status: In operation
- Owner: Kraftwerke Oberhasli AG
- Locale: Canton of Bern, Switzerland
- Coordinates: 46°36′49″N 08°18′31″E
- Termini: Handegg; Gelmersee
- Stations: 2

Service
- Type: Cable railway
- Operator: Kraftwerke Oberhasli AG
- Rolling stock: 1 for 24 passengers

History
- Opened: 1926; 100 years ago
- Open to the public: 2001; 25 years ago
- Federal concession: 2004; 22 years ago

Technical
- Track length: 1,028 m (3,373 ft)
- Track gauge: 1,000 mm (3 ft 3 3/8 in) metre gauge
- Electrification: From opening
- Operating speed: 2 m/s (4.5 mph)
- Highest elevation: 1,850 m (6,070 ft)
- Maximum incline: 106% (average 49.4%)

The Gelmerbahn (Note: Swiss Standard German pronunciation: [ˈgɛlmərˌbaːn].) or Gelmer Funicular is a cable railway in the canton of Bern, Switzerland. It links a lower terminus at Handegg, in the Haslital (the valley of the upper Aar River), with an upper terminus at the Gelmersee lake, 448 metres (1,470 ft) above. The Handegg terminus of the line is close to the road over the Grimsel Pass. It is accessible by car and by an infrequent PostBus service.

With a maximum incline of 106% (or 47°), Gelmerbahn was commonly identified as the steepest funicular in Europe, until the opening of the Stoosbahn (a true funicular which reaches 110%) in 2017. It remains the steepest open-car railway in Europe.

== History ==
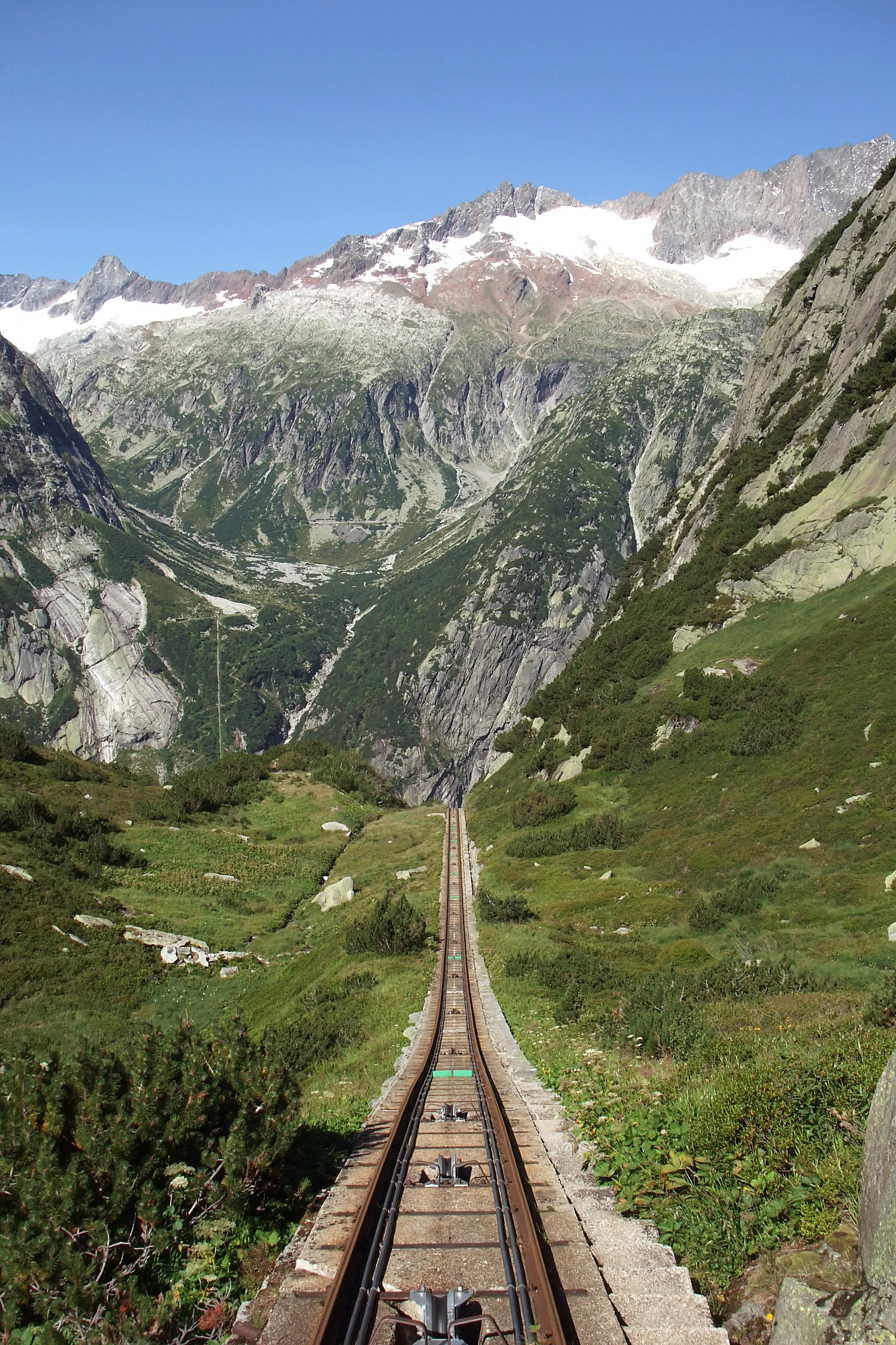
View down the line

The cable railway was originally built to facilitate the construction of the Gelmersee – a reservoir constructed in 1926 to exploit the hydroelectric resources of the area – and was not opened for public use until 2001. The line is owned and operated by Kraftwerke Oberhasli AG (KWO), which owns the power station.

Another funicular, the Standseilbahn Handegg–Wasserschloss Handeggfluh Ärlen, existed on the opposite side of the valley from 1948 to 2015.

== Operation ==
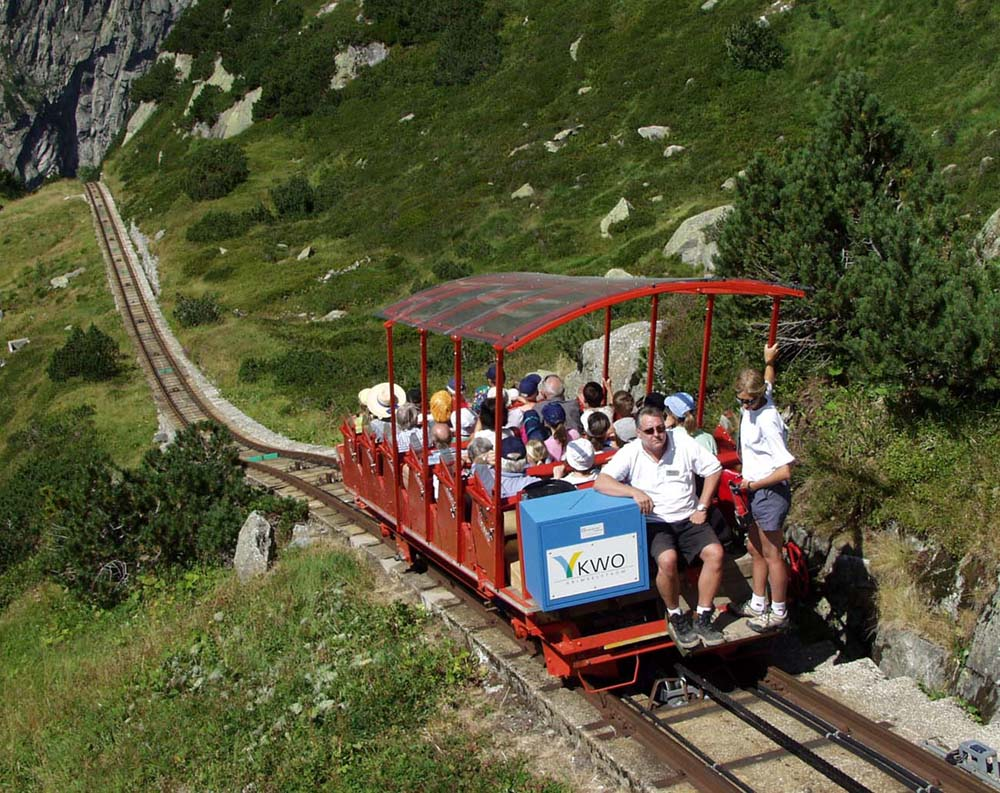
Car just below the upper station

The line operates from the beginning of June to mid-October, in daylight hours only. It has the following parameters:

Feature	Value
Number of cars	1
Number of stops	3
Configuration	Single track with no passing loop
Track length	1,028 m (3,373 ft)
Rise	448 m (1,470 ft)
Maximum gradient	106% (46°41')
Track gauge	1,000 mm (3 ft 3 3/8 in) metre gauge
Speed	2 m/s (6.6 ft/s)
Journey time	10 minutes
Capacity	24 passengers per car; 60 persons in each direction per hour

== See also ==
- List of funiculars in Switzerland
