= Reichenbachfall Funicular =

Funicular railway in the Canton of Bern, Switzerland

Coordinates: 46.7195°N 8.1877°E

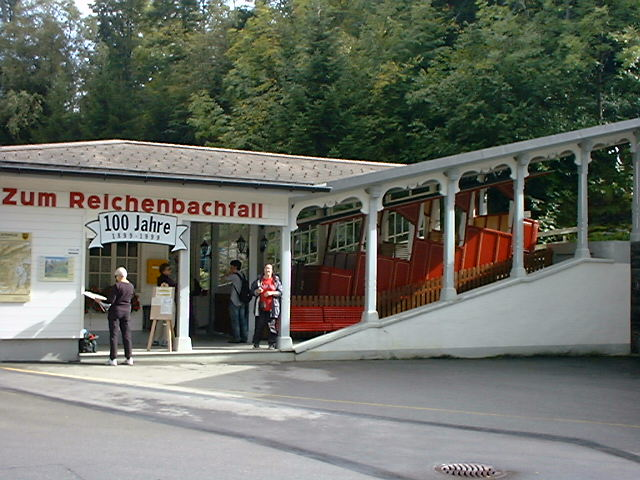
- The lower station

Overview
- Status: in operation
- Owner: EWR Energie
- Locale: Bernese Oberland, Canton of Bern, Switzerland
- Termini: Willigen (Reichenbachfallbahn); Reichenbachfall
- Stations: 2

Service
- Type: Funicular
- Operator(s): Kraftwerke Oberhasli AG
- Rolling stock: 2 for 24 passengers each

History
- Opened: 8 September 1899 (125 years ago)
- Enhancements: 1999

Technical
- Track length: 714 metres (2,343 ft)
- Number of tracks: 1 with passing loop
- Track gauge: Metre (3 ft 3 3/8 in)
- Electrification: from opening
- Operating speed: 2 metres per second (6.6 ft/s)
- Highest elevation: 843 metres (2,766 ft)
- Maximum incline: 61%

The Reichenbachfall Funicular (German: Reichenbachfall-Bahn; RfB) is a funicular in the Bernese Oberland region of the canton of Bern, Switzerland. It links Willigen, near Meiringen, with the uppermost of the Reichenbach Falls, famous as the site of the apparent death of Sir Arthur Conan Doyle's fictional hero, Sherlock Holmes. On its route the line follows and crosses the lower falls of the Reichenbach.

The funicular was opened in 1899, and was rebuilt in 1999 to the original design. Between 1912 and 1956, it was linked to Meiringen by the Meiringen–Reichenbach–Aareschlucht tramway. Today it is owned by the EWR Energie company, which operates the adjacent hydroelectric power plant, but is maintained by the neighbouring Kraftwerke Oberhasli company, which also operates several other lines in the area. It has the following parameters:

Feature	Value
Number of cars	2
Number of stops	3
Configuration	Single track with passing loop
Track length	714 metres (2,343 ft)
Rise	242 metres (794 ft)
Maximum gradient	61%
Track gauge	1,000 mm (3 ft 3 3/8 in) metre gauge
Capacity	24 passengers per car
Traction	Electric
Speed	2 metres per second (6.6 ft/s)
Journey time	7.5 mins

The funicular operates only between May and mid-October. During this period it operates every 15 minutes from 09:00 to 17:00.

The lower station is some 20 minutes walk, or a 6-minute bus ride, from Meiringen station on the Brünig railway line. It is 500 m from the Alpbach station.

== Gallery ==
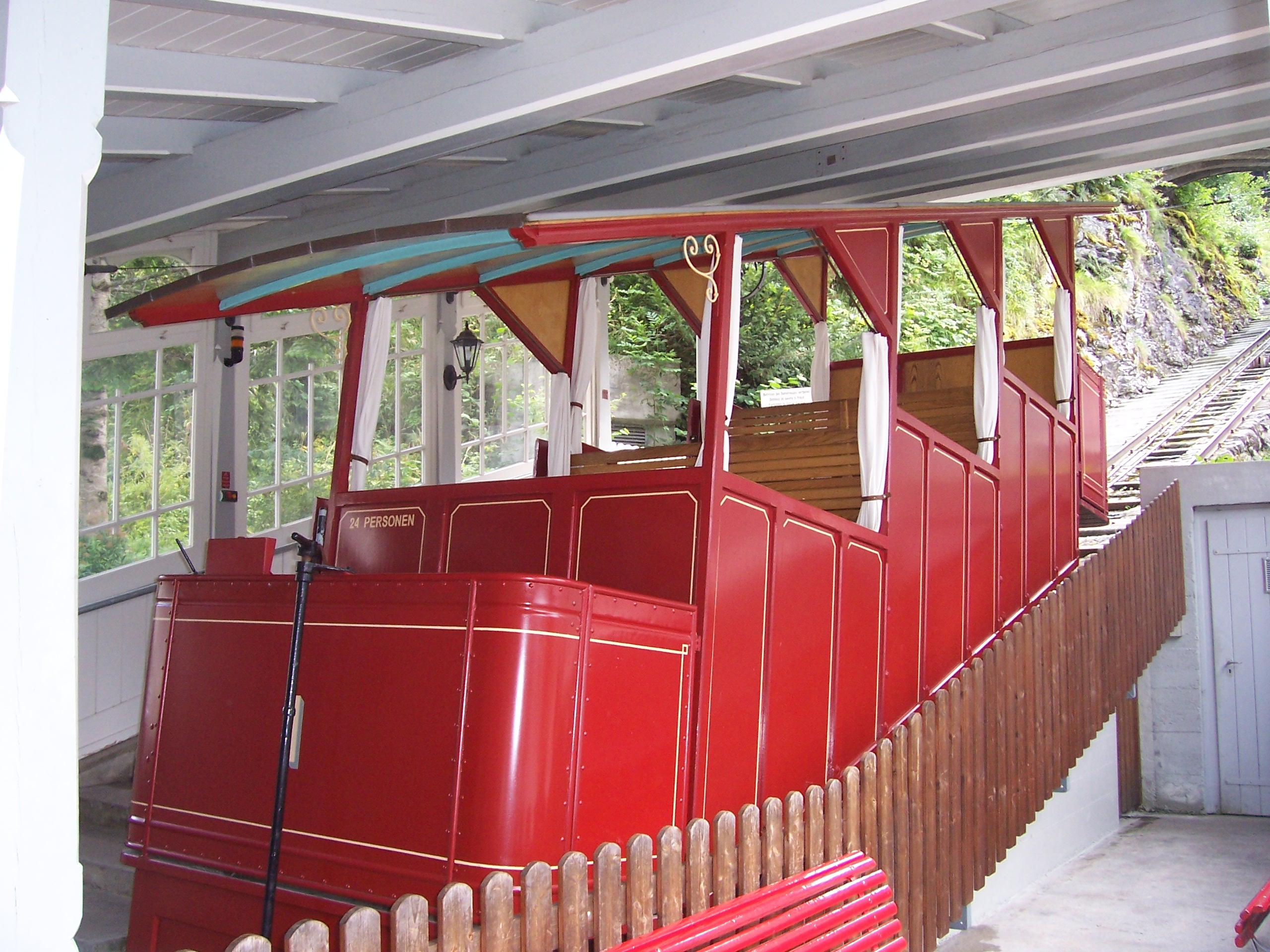
Car in lower station

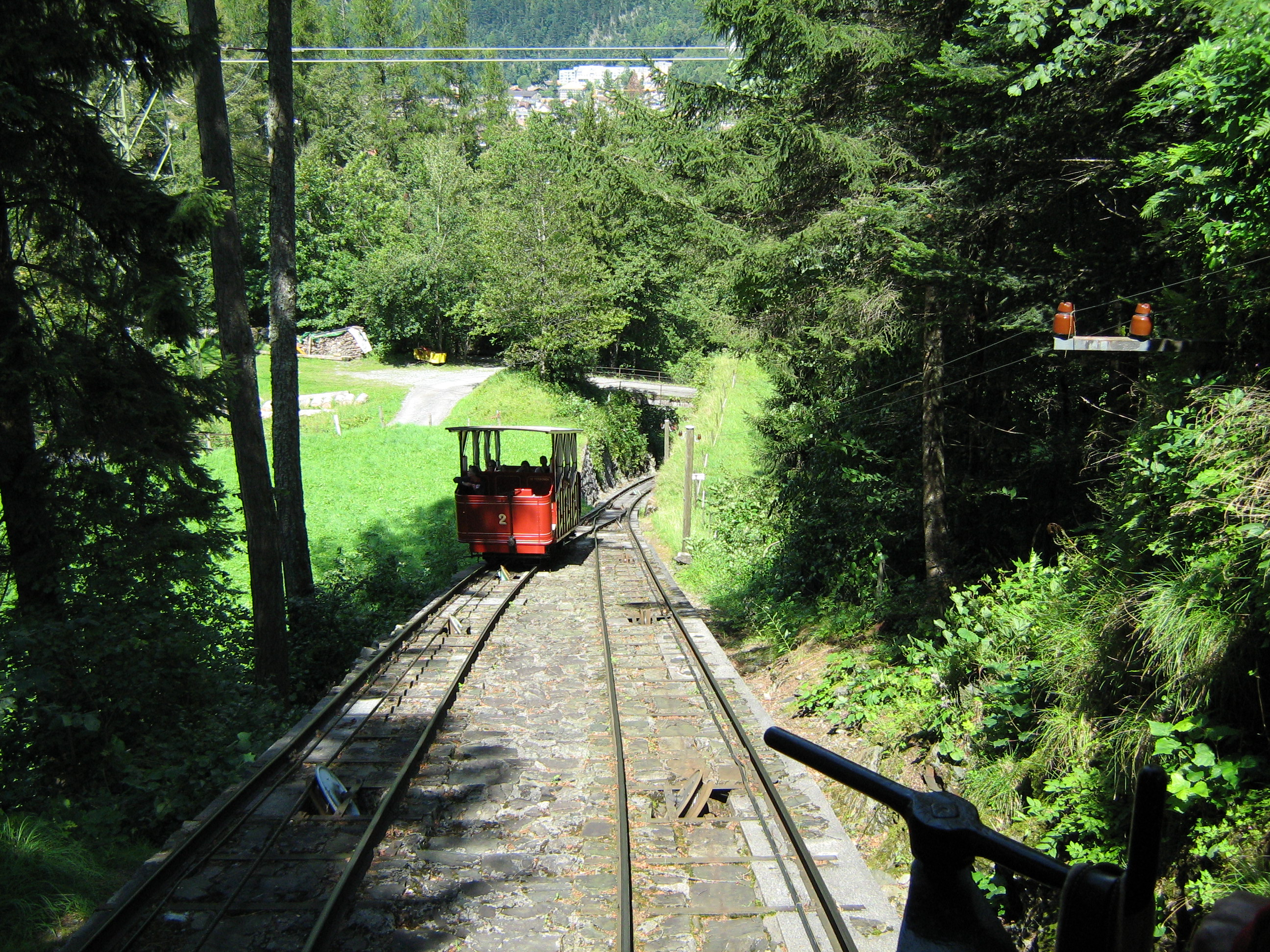
At the passing loop

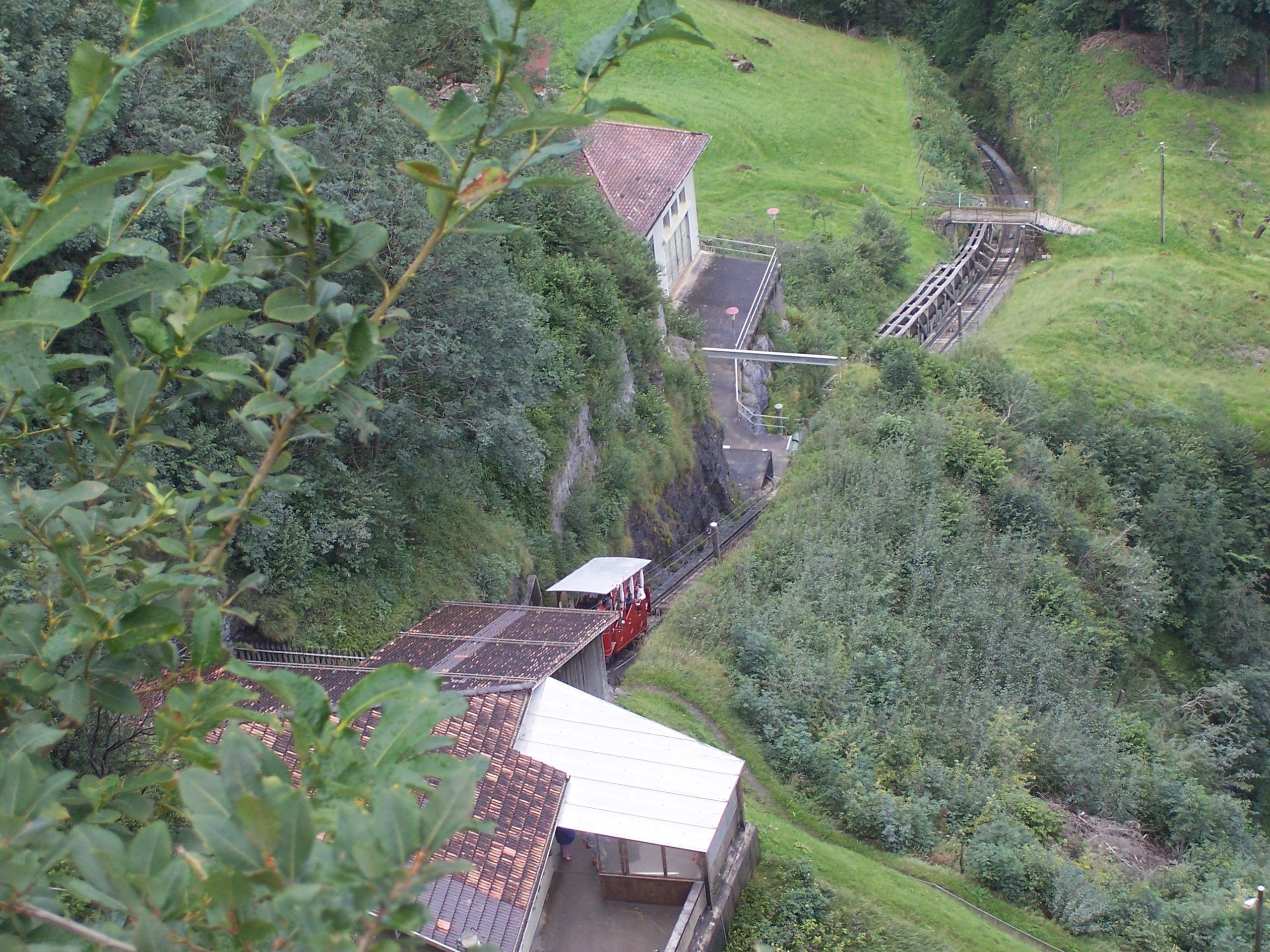
Looking down on the upper station

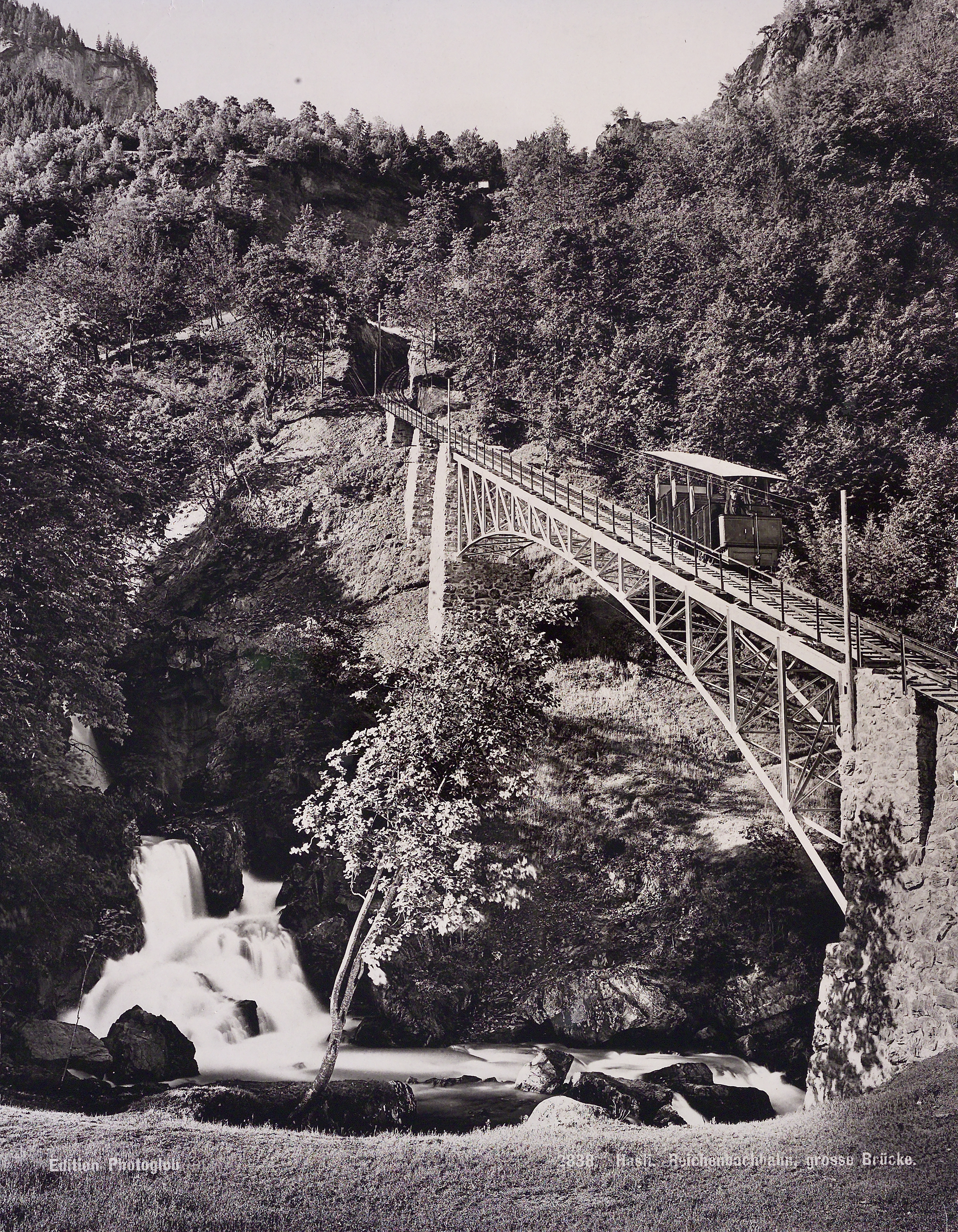
The line's longest bridge, c. 1910
