= Räterichsbodensee =

Lake in the Canton of Bern, Switzerland

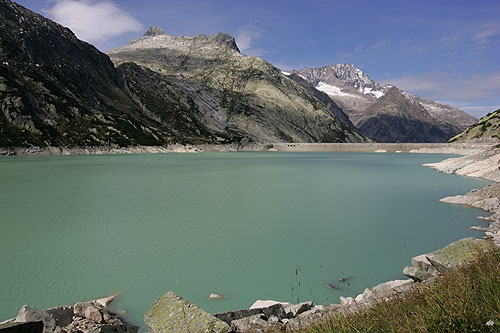

- Location within Canton of Bern Location within Switzerland Location within Alps
- Interactive map of Räterichsbodensee
- Location: Grimsel, Canton of Bern
- Coordinates: 46°35′7″N 8°19′41″E
- Type: reservoir
- Primary inflows: Aar, Bächlis Bach, Gärstenbach, Bockbach
- Primary outflows: Aar
- Catchment area: 130.2 km^{2} (50.3 sq mi)
- Basin countries: Switzerland
- Surface area: 0.67 km^{2} (0.26 sq mi)
- Max. depth: 77 m (253 ft)
- Water volume: 25 million cubic metres (20,000 acre⋅ft)
- Surface elevation: 1,767 m (5,797 ft)

Räterichsbodensee is a lake in Guttannen, Oberhasli, Switzerland. The reservoir has a volume of 25 million m^{3}, a surface area is 0.67 km^{2} (0.26 sq mi) and is operated by Kraftwerke Oberhasli. It is connected to the river Aare.

== See also ==
- List of lakes of Switzerland
- List of mountain lakes of Switzerland
