= Guttannen =

- Municipality
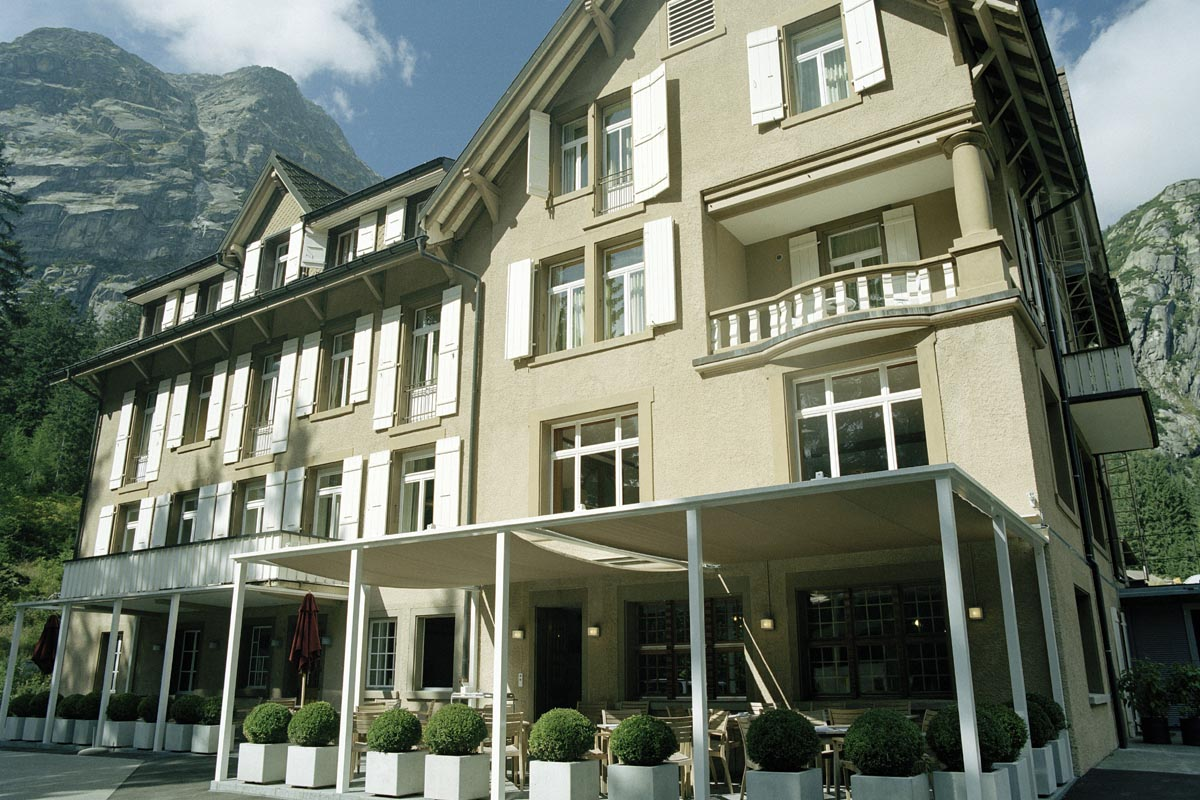
- Handeck Hotel in Guttannen

- Flag Coat of arms
- Location of Guttannen
- Location within Switzerland Location within Canton of Bern
- Coordinates: 46°39′N 8°17′E
- Country: Switzerland
- Canton: Bern
- District: Interlaken-Oberhasli

Government
  - Executive: Gemeinderat with 5 members
  - Mayor: Gemeindepräsident(in); Werner Schläppi (as of 2026)

Area
  - Total: 200.7 km^{2} (77.5 sq mi)
- Elevation: 1,057 m (3,468 ft)

Population (December 2020)
  - Total: 245
  - Density: 1.22/km^{2} (3.16/sq mi)
- Time zone: UTC+01:00 (CET)
  - Summer (DST): UTC+02:00 (CEST)
- Postal code: 3864
- SFOS number: 782
- ISO 3166 code: CH-BE
- Surrounded by: Fieschertal (VS), Gadmen, Grindelwald, Innertkirchen, Münster-Geschinen (VS), Obergesteln (VS), Oberwald (VS), Ulrichen (VS)
- Website: www.guttannen.ch

Guttannen is a municipality in the Interlaken-Oberhasli administrative district in the canton of Bern in Switzerland.

== Origin of the name ==
Guttannen is the name of a meadow, which became the name of the municipality. It comes from the phrase ze den guoten tannen (by the good firs).

== History ==
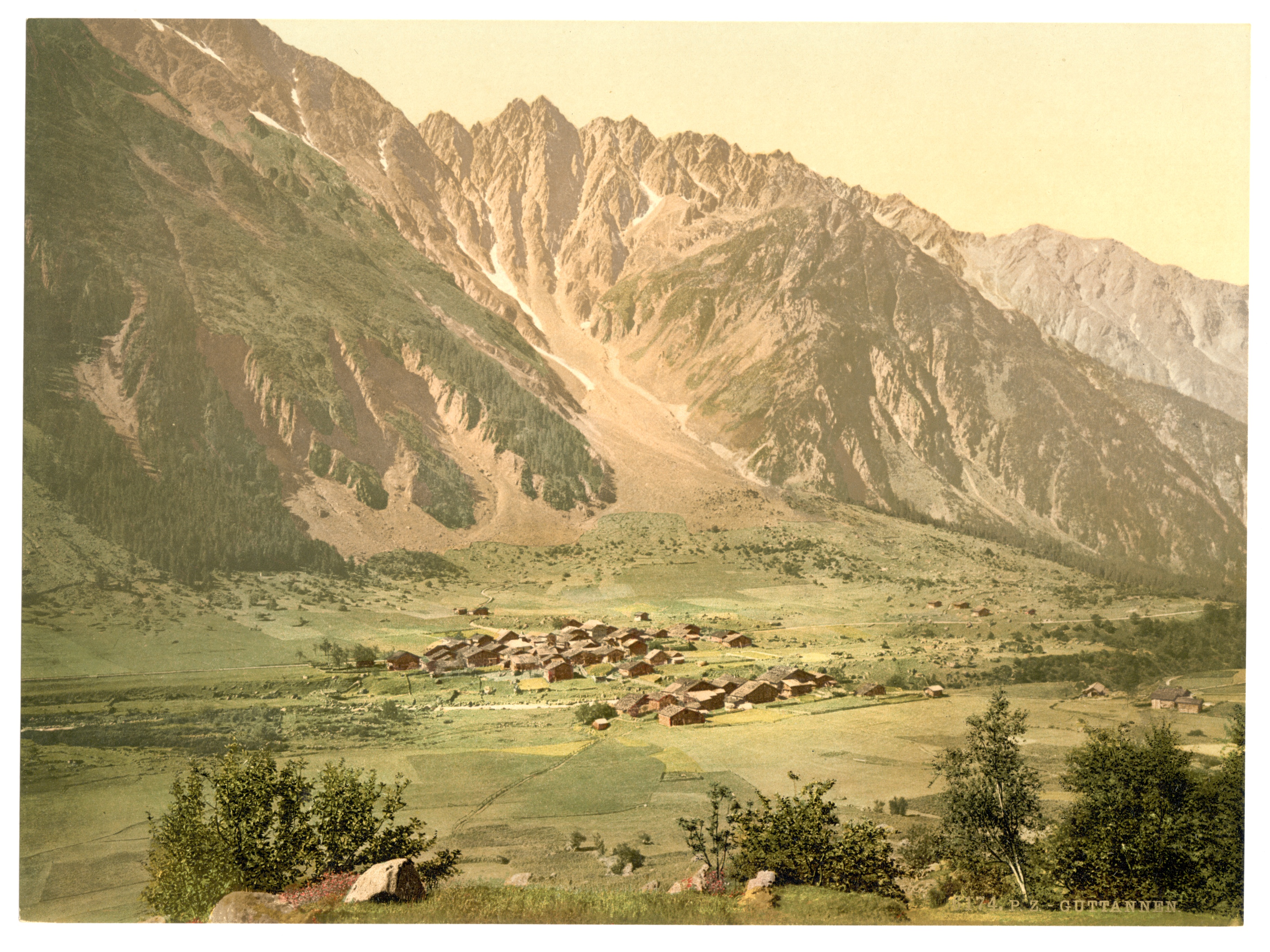
Photochrom of the Grimsel Pass and Guttannen

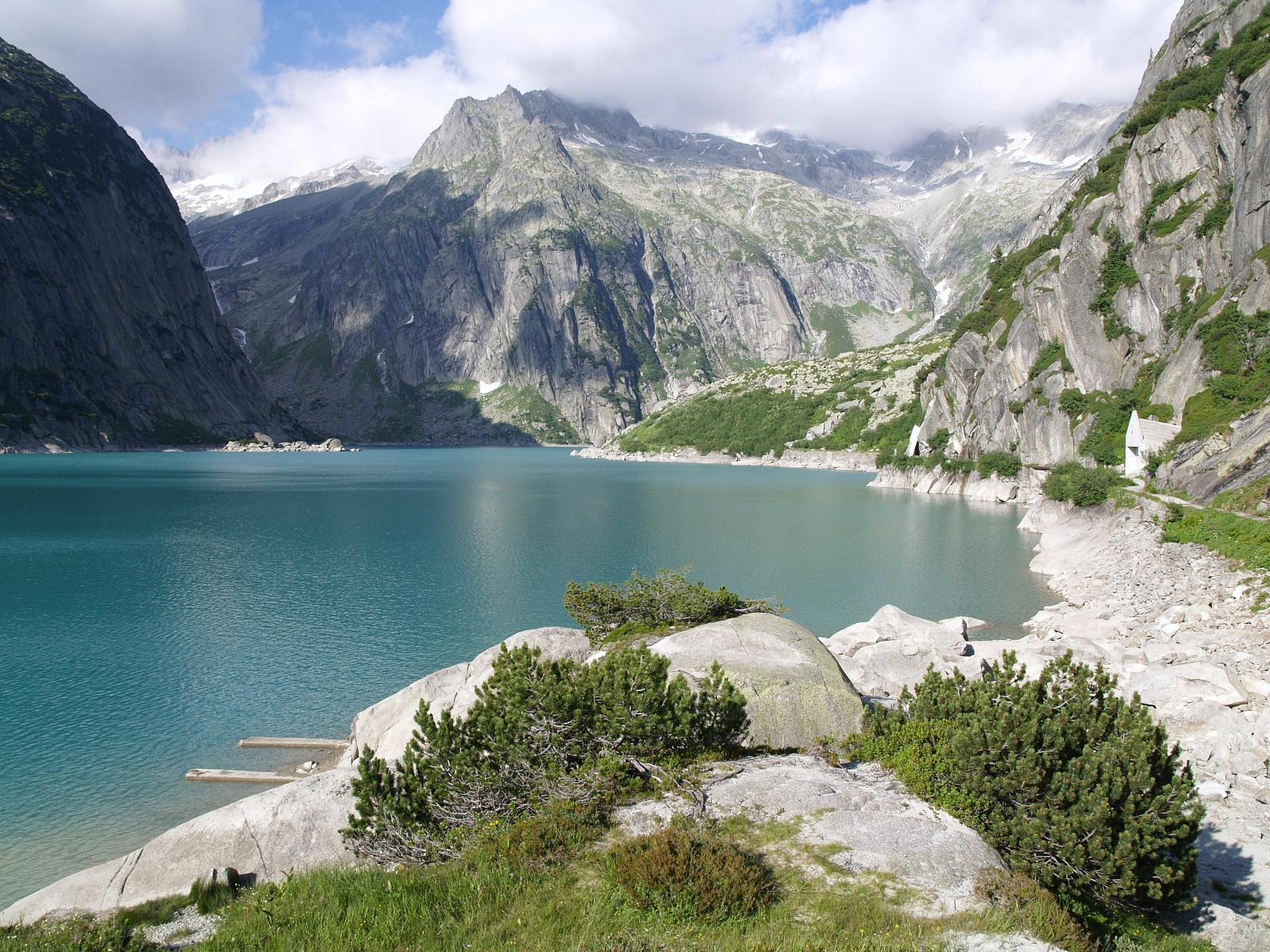
The Gelmersee, one of the reservoirs above Guttannen

Guttannen is first mentioned in 1377 as Guotentannon.

During the Middle Ages it was part of the Vogtei of Hasli and the parish of Meiringen. In 1334 the entire Vogtei was acquired by Bern. A chapel was built in the village in 1467 though it did not have a baptismal font. When the entire Canton accepted the new faith of the Protestant Reformation, the chapel was converted and remained under Meiringen. In 1713 it joined the parish of Innertkirchen where it remained until it became an independent parish in 1816. The old chapel was damaged in a fire in 1723 and replaced with a new chapel which became a parish church when Guttannen became a parish. Following the 1798 French invasion, Guttannen became part of the Helvetic Republic Canton of Oberland. With the 1803 Act of Mediation it returned to the Canton of Bern and the Oberhasli district.

For most of its history the villagers lived from farming on the valley floor, seasonal alpine herding and trade over the Grimsel Pass. Due to the short growing season and poor soil many residents mined lead or zinc or carved wood or soapstone. Many residents emigrated to escape the poverty. In the 17th and 18th centuries they went to Germany or the Swiss Plateau, while in the late 18th and 19th centuries they went to the United States and settled in the Carolinas, Pennsylvania and Kentucky.

In the early 19th century mountain climbers began to come to Guttannen to explore the high peaks above the valley. In 1811-12 the Finstaarhorn was climbed and by the 1830s Louis Agassiz had popularized mountain climbing and trained guides in Guttanen. The Grimsel Pass road (built 1894-95) further opened up the village to trade and tourism. The construction of five hydroelectric dams and six reservoirs in the Grimsel Pass, between 1925 and 1975, brought prosperity to the village. The Kraftwerke Oberhasli (KWO) company was founded in 1925 to manage the power plants and today is the largest employer in Guttannen. A modern road was built over the pass over a 26-year period (1960-1986).

== Geography ==
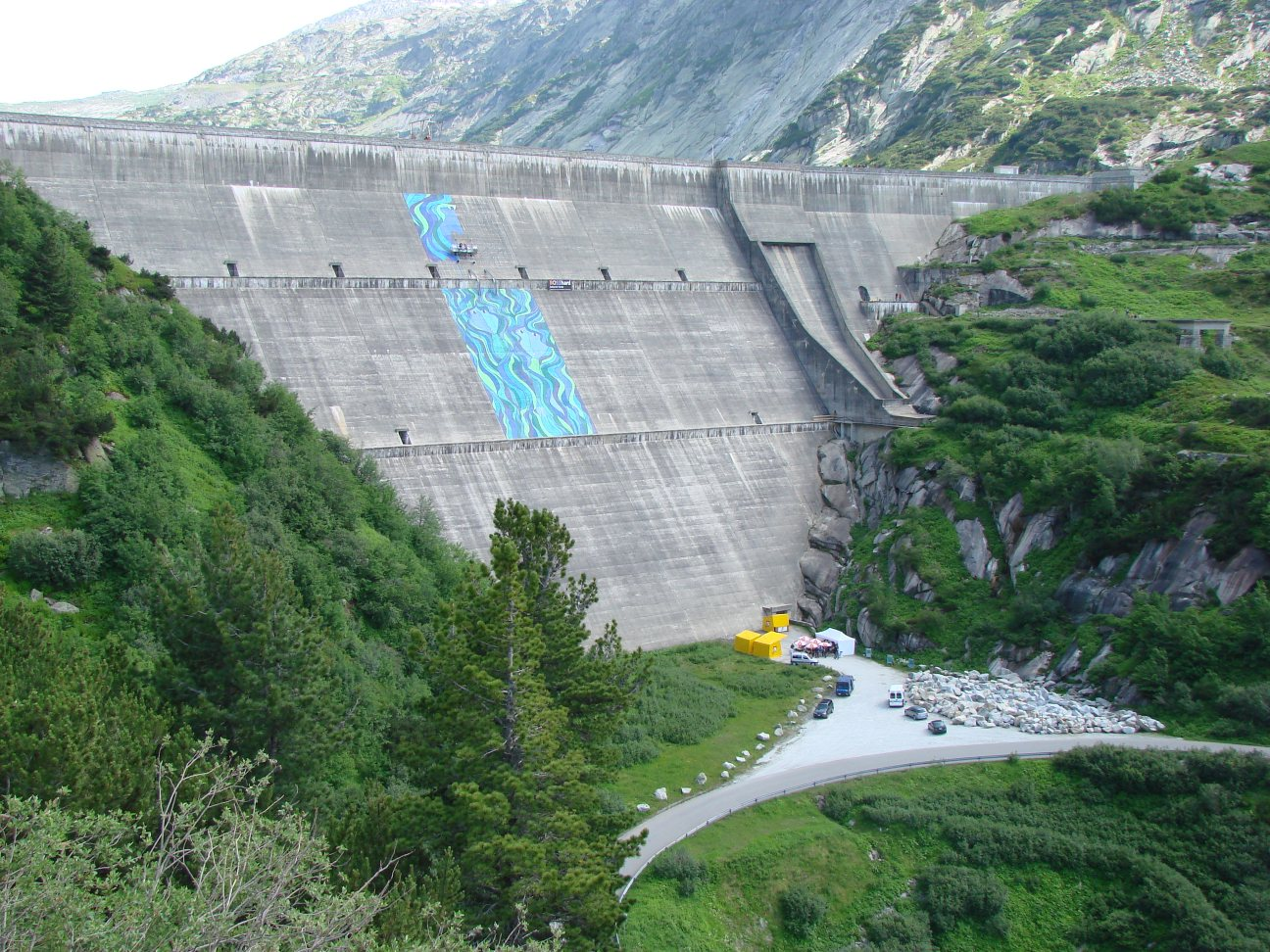
Lake Räterichsboden dam

Guttannen lies in the Bernese Oberland near Grimsel Pass. It is the highest settlement in the Haslital, and the municipality encompasses the upper stretches of that valley as far as the summit of the Grimsel Pass. The adjacent municipalities from the north clockwise are Innertkirchen, Obergoms, Münster-Geschinen, Fieschertal and Grindelwald.

The Aare springs from glaciers in Guttannen. There are four lakes in the municipality: Lake Oberaar, Lake Grimsel, Lake Räterichsboden and Lake Gelmer. In the western part of the municipality are the mountains Schreckhorn, Lauteraarhorn, Finsteraarhorn, Agassizhorn and Sidelhorn. Guttannen also includes Finsteraar Glacier, Lauteraar Glacier, Unteraar Glacier, Grueben Glacier, and Bächli Glacier.

By Swiss standards, the municipality is large in area; by comparison it is larger than the entire Canton of Appenzell Innerrhoden. In elevation it stretches from the valley floor which is between 800–1,300 m (2,600–4,300 ft) into the high alpine peaks of the Finsteraarhorn group.

Guttannen has an area of 200.85 km^{2} (77.55 sq mi). As of 2012, a total of 7.67 km^{2} (2.96 mi^{2}) or 3.8% is used for agricultural purposes, while 18.77 km^{2} (7.25 mi^{2}) or 9.3% is forested. The rest of the municipality is 0.98 km^{2} (0.38 mi^{2}) or 0.5% is settled (buildings or roads), 7.45 km^{2} (2.88 mi^{2}) or 3.7% is either rivers or lakes and 165.86 km^{2} (64.04 mi^{2}) or 82.6% is unproductive land.

During the same year, housing and buildings made up 0.1% and transportation infrastructure made up 0.3%. All of the forested land area is covered with heavy forests. Of the agricultural land, and 2.9% is used for alpine pastures. Of the water in the municipality, 3.0% is in lakes and 0.7% is in rivers and streams. Of the unproductive areas, 13.7% is unproductive vegetation, 45.6% is too rocky for vegetation and 23.3% of the land is covered by glaciers.

On 31 December 2009 Amtsbezirk Oberhasli, the municipality's former district, was dissolved. On the following day, 1 January 2010, it joined the newly created Verwaltungskreis Interlaken-Oberhasli.

== Coat of arms ==
The blazon of the municipal coat of arms is Or a Fir tree Sable trunked and eradicated Gules between two Mullets of the last in chief.

== Demographics ==
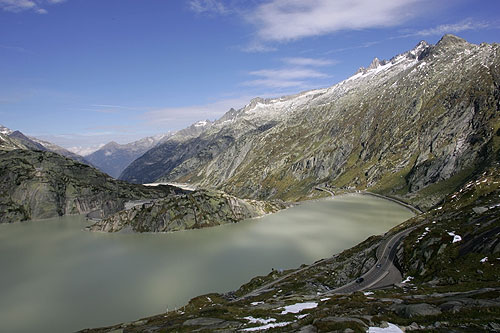
Lake Grimsel

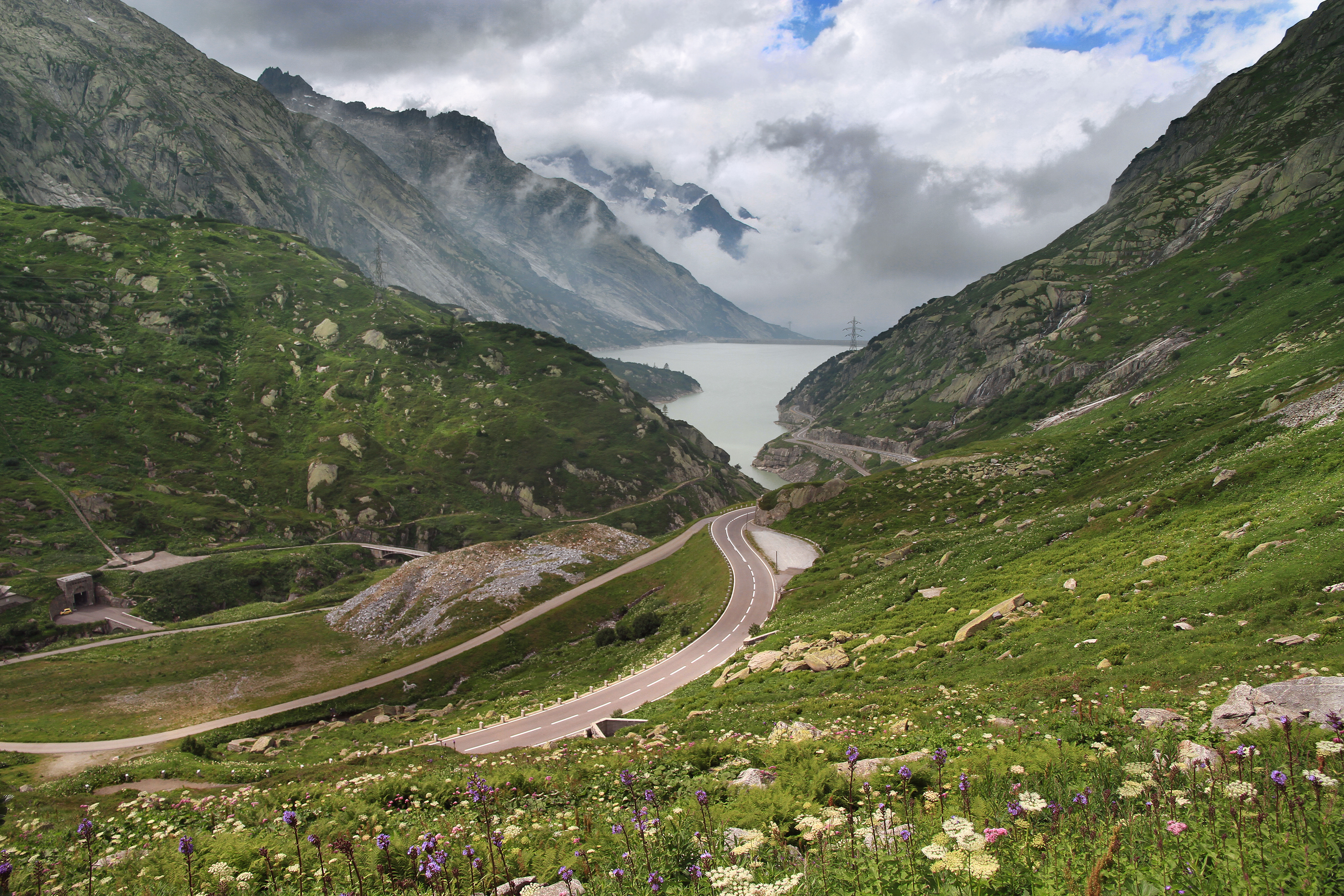
The Räterichsbodensee and the Haslital road near Guttannen

Guttannen has a population (as of December 2020) of 245. As of 2011, 7.0% of the population are resident foreign nationals. Over the last year (2010-2011) the population has changed at a rate of -3.2%. Migration accounted for -3.9%, while births and deaths accounted for 0.3%.

Most of the population (as of 2000) speaks German (322 or 98.2%) as their first language, while one person speaks French and another speaks Romansh.

As of 2008, the population was 49.4% male and 50.6% female. The population was made up of 145 Swiss men (46.8% of the population) and 8 (2.6%) non-Swiss men. There were 143 Swiss women (46.1%) and 14 (4.5%) non-Swiss women. Of the population in the municipality, 223 or about 68.0% were born in Guttannen and lived there in 2000. There were 60 or 18.3% who were born in the same canton, while 23 or 7.0% were born somewhere else in Switzerland, and 10 or 3.0% were born outside of Switzerland.

As of 2011, children and teenagers (0–19 years old) make up 19% of the population, while adults (20–64 years old) make up 58.7% and seniors (over 64 years old) make up 22.3%.

As of 2000, there were 126 people who were single and never married in the municipality. There were 178 married individuals, 19 widows or widowers and 5 individuals who are divorced.

As of 2010, there were 34 households that consist of only one person and 12 households with five or more people. In 2000, a total of 118 apartments (76.1% of the total) were permanently occupied, while 21 apartments (13.5%) were seasonally occupied and 16 apartments (10.3%) were empty. In 2011, single family homes made up 57.5% of the total housing in the municipality.

The historical population is given in the following chart:

== Heritage sites of national significance ==
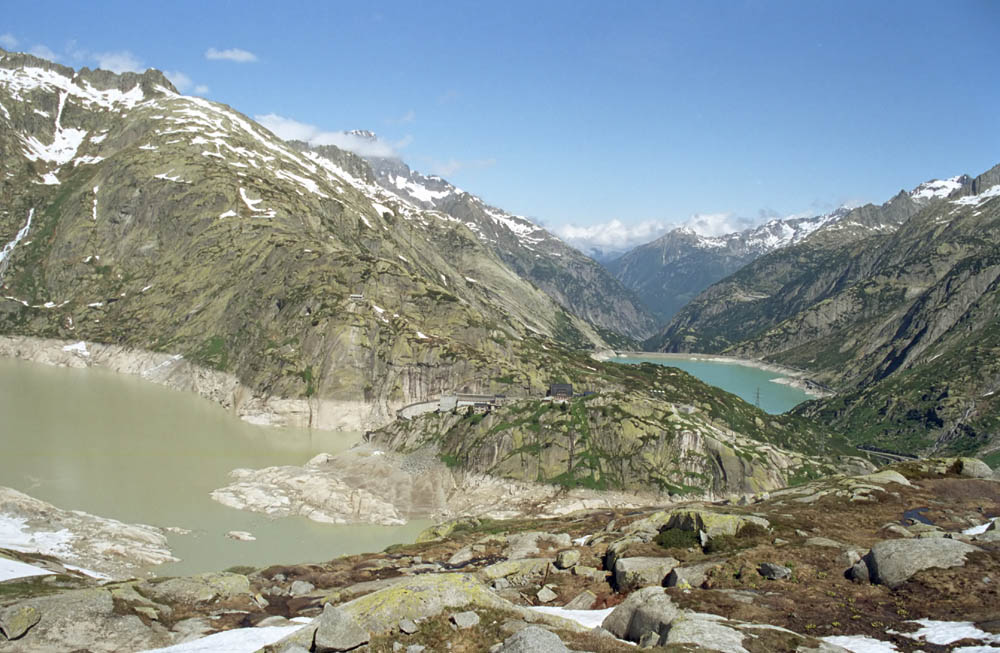
View of the Grimsel pass and the dam.

The Grimselstaumauer (Grimsel dam) and the associated Grimsel Pass hospice are listed as Swiss heritage site of national significance.

== Politics ==
In the 2011 federal election the most popular party was the Swiss People's Party (SVP) which received 49.2% of the vote. The next three most popular parties were the Conservative Democratic Party (BDP) (21.3%), the Green Party (10.5%) and the Social Democratic Party (SP) (8.3%). In the federal election, a total of 117 votes were cast, and the voter turnout was 49.6%.

== Economy ==
As of 2011, Guttannen had an unemployment rate of 0.48%. As of 2008, there were a total of 218 people employed in the municipality. Of these, there were 72 people employed in the primary economic sector and about 24 businesses involved in this sector. 58 people were employed in the secondary sector and there were 6 businesses in this sector. 88 people were employed in the tertiary sector, with 13 businesses in this sector. There were 172 residents of the municipality who were employed in some capacity, of which females made up 39.0% of the workforce.

In 2008 there were a total of 153 full-time equivalent jobs. The number of jobs in the primary sector was 30, all of which were in agriculture. The number of jobs in the secondary sector was 52 of which 7 or (13.5%) were in manufacturing and 5 (9.6%) were in construction. The number of jobs in the tertiary sector was 71. In the tertiary sector; 3 or 4.2% were in wholesale or retail sales or the repair of motor vehicles, 3 or 4.2% were in the movement and storage of goods, 54 or 76.1% were in a hotel or restaurant, 4 or 5.6% were in education.

In 2000, there were 12 workers who commuted into the municipality and 94 workers who commuted away. The municipality is a net exporter of workers, with about 7.8 workers leaving the municipality for every one entering. A total of 78 workers (86.7% of the 90 total workers in the municipality) both lived and worked in Guttannen. Of the working population, 29.7% used public transportation to get to work, and 36.6% used a private car.

In 2011 the average local and cantonal tax rate on a married resident, with two children, of Guttannen making 150,000 CHF was 11.5%, while an unmarried resident's rate was 16.9%. For comparison, the average rate for the entire canton in the same year, was 14.2% and 22.0%, while the nationwide average was 12.3% and 21.1% respectively.

In 2009 there were a total of 134 tax payers in the municipality. Of that total, 32 made over 75,000 CHF per year. There were 3 people who made between 15,000 and 20,000 per year. The greatest number of workers, 41, made between 50,000 and 75,000 CHF per year. The average income of the over 75,000 CHF group in Guttannen was 97,497 CHF, while the average across all of Switzerland was 130,478 CHF.

In 2011 a total of 1.0% of the population received direct financial assistance from the government.

== Religion ==
Guttannen is an evangelical-reformed parish.

From the 2000 census, 282 or 86.0% belonged to the Swiss Reformed Church, while 19 or 5.8% were Roman Catholic. Of the rest of the population, there were 2 individuals (or about 0.61% of the population) who belonged to another Christian church. There was 1 individual who was Muslim. 7 (or about 2.13% of the population) belonged to no church, are agnostic or atheist, and 17 individuals (or about 5.18% of the population) did not answer the question.

== Climate ==
Between 1981 and 2010 Guttannen had an average of 152.2 days of rain or snow per year and on average received 1,650 mm (65 in) of precipitation. The wettest month was May during which time Guttannen received an average of 164 mm (6.5 in) of rain or snow. During this month there was precipitation for an average of 14.8 days. The month with the most days of precipitation was June, with an average of 15, but with only 156 mm (6.1 in) of rain or snow. The driest month of the year was October with an average of 113 mm (4.4 in) of precipitation over 10.4 days.

== Education ==
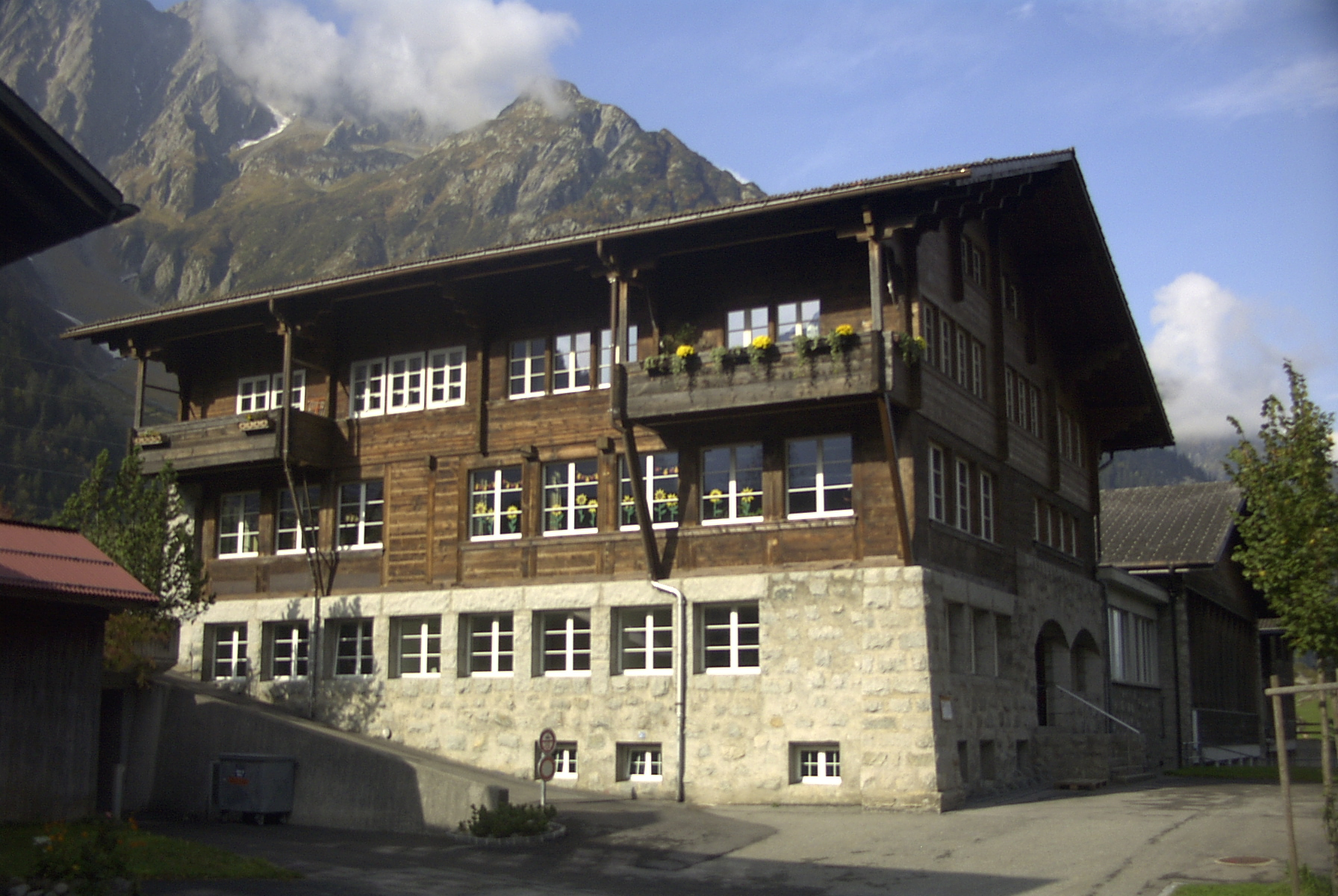
Guttannen school building

In Guttannen about 55.6% of the population have completed non-mandatory upper secondary education, and 8.4% have completed additional higher education (either university or a Fachhochschule). A total of 16 Swiss men have completed some form of tertiary schooling listed in the census.

The Canton of Bern school system provides one year of non-obligatory Kindergarten, followed by six years of Primary school. This is followed by three years of obligatory lower Secondary school where the students are separated according to ability and aptitude. Following the lower Secondary students may attend additional schooling or they may enter an apprenticeship.

During the 2011-12 school year, there were a total of 31 students attending classes in Guttannen. There was one kindergarten class with a total of 6 students in the municipality. The municipality had 2 primary classes and 25 students. Of the primary students, 16.0% were permanent or temporary residents of Switzerland (not citizens) and 8.0% have a different mother language than the classroom language.

As of 2000, there were a total of 21 students living in and attending school in the municipality, while 15 students from Guttannen attended schools outside the municipality.
