= Federal Office of Transport =

Swiss federal agency

- German: Bundesamt für Verkehr; French: Office fédéral des transports Italian: Ufficio federale dei trasporti Romansh: Uffizi federal da traffic

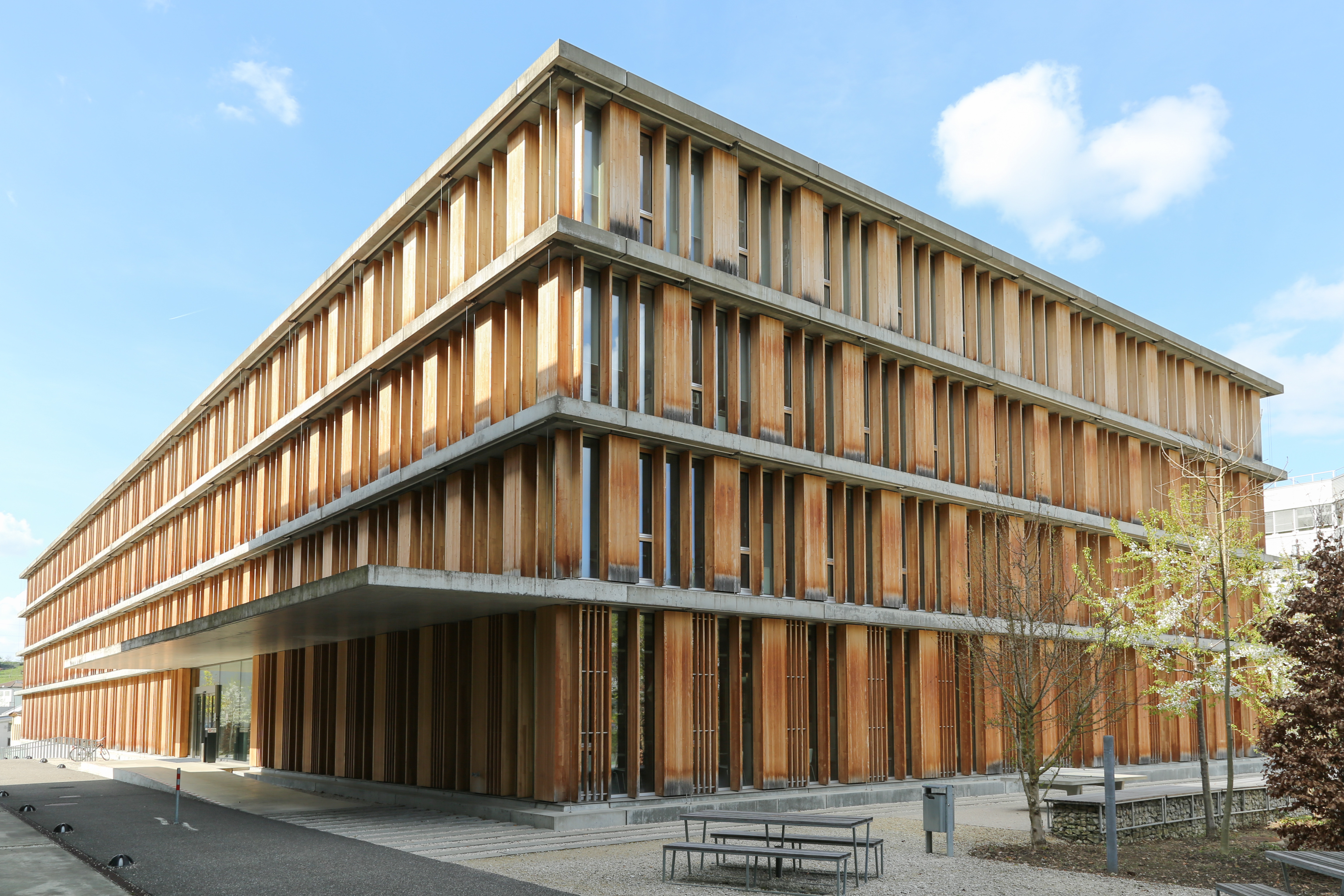
- The building of the Federal Office of Transport (2014).

Agency overview
- Jurisdiction: Federal administration of Switzerland
- Minister responsible: Albert Rösti, Federal Councillor
- Parent agency: Federal Department of Environment, Transport, Energy and Communications
- Website: www.bav.admin.ch

The Federal Office of Transport, FOT (Note: German: Bundesamt für Verkehr, BAV, French: Office fédéral des transports, OFT, Italian: Ufficio federale dei trasporti, UFT) is a federal authority of the Swiss Confederation. It deals with public transport in Switzerland, i.e. railways, cableways, trolleybuses, buses and ships. It is also responsible for various aspects of freight transport. It implements the policies of the government (Federal Council), parliament and the Swiss electorate (sovereign) in these areas. The FOT reports to the Federal Department of the Environment, Transport, Energy and Communications (DETEC). The office employs 350 people (as of 2023) in five divisions: Business Administration and Organisation, Infrastructure, Finance, Safety and Policy. Peter Füglistaler, who was previously a member of the Executive Board of SBB Infrastructure, has been Director since June 2010.

The FOT is committed to efficient, environmentally friendly, safe and attractive public transport and freight transport. This results in close cooperation with public transport companies (licensed transport companies KTU) and freight transport companies, as well as with politicians.

== History ==
In 1935, the former Railway Division of the Post and Railway Department was renamed the Federal Office of Transport SAB. The Office was now also responsible for overall transport issues, in particular the relationship between rail and road transport and the promotion of tourism. In 1979, the office was renamed the Federal Office of Transport.

== Supervisory authority ==
The Federal Office of Transport is the supervisory authority for public transport. It carries out random and risk-oriented checks to ensure that public transport and rail freight transport companies fulfil their legal responsibilities. The FOT carries out its supervisory activities where a legal mandate exists. Supervision is therefore not general, but concerns those aspects that are explicitly provided for by laws, ordinances or international treaties. This is the case in particular with various requirements in the special laws for public transport and freight transport (Passenger Transport Act, Railways Act, Cableways Act, Freight Transport Act, etc.). The FOT also monitors compliance with other, non-transport-specific laws (e.g. Environmental Protection Act, Subsidies Act, Equal Opportunities for Disabled Persons Act). The specific supervisory tasks of the FOT can be defined differently from law to law. The most important supervisory function is focussed on safety. Here, the FOT exercises its supervision through operational checks, audits and inspections. In addition, this supervisory role also comes into play when dealing with planning approvals, concessions and the granting of operating licences, as well as when issuing or updating regulations, for example in the area of cyber security.

== Financing, planning and organisation ==
Another important task is the financing of public transport. The FOT allocates around CHF 1 billion per year from the federal budget for non-profitable regional passenger transport services (suburban railways, intercity buses, etc.) and CHF 4 to 5 billion from the railway infrastructure fund for the maintenance, operation and expansion of the railway network (as of 2023). It is also leading the planning process for the further expansion of the railway network, with the involvement of the cantons and transport companies. The focus for the coming decades will be on various major projects from the 2025 and 2035 expansion steps and the ZEB programme. The Office also implements and continuously develops the modal shift policy, i.e. the transfer of freight transport through the Alps from road to rail. The FOT thus makes a significant contribution to the operation and further development of public transport and freight transport in Switzerland.

== Other tasks ==
The Office is responsible for coordinating Swiss transport policy with the EU and neighbouring countries. It manages the implementation of the Disability Discrimination Act in the railway sector. It is also responsible for creating the legal and planning framework for an underground freight transport system and for numerous other tasks.

== Full-time positions since 2001 ==
Raw data

"Federal Finance Administration FFA: State financial statements".
"Federal Finance Administration FFA: Data portal".
