= Grimsel Pass =

Mountain pass in Switzerland through the Bernese Alps

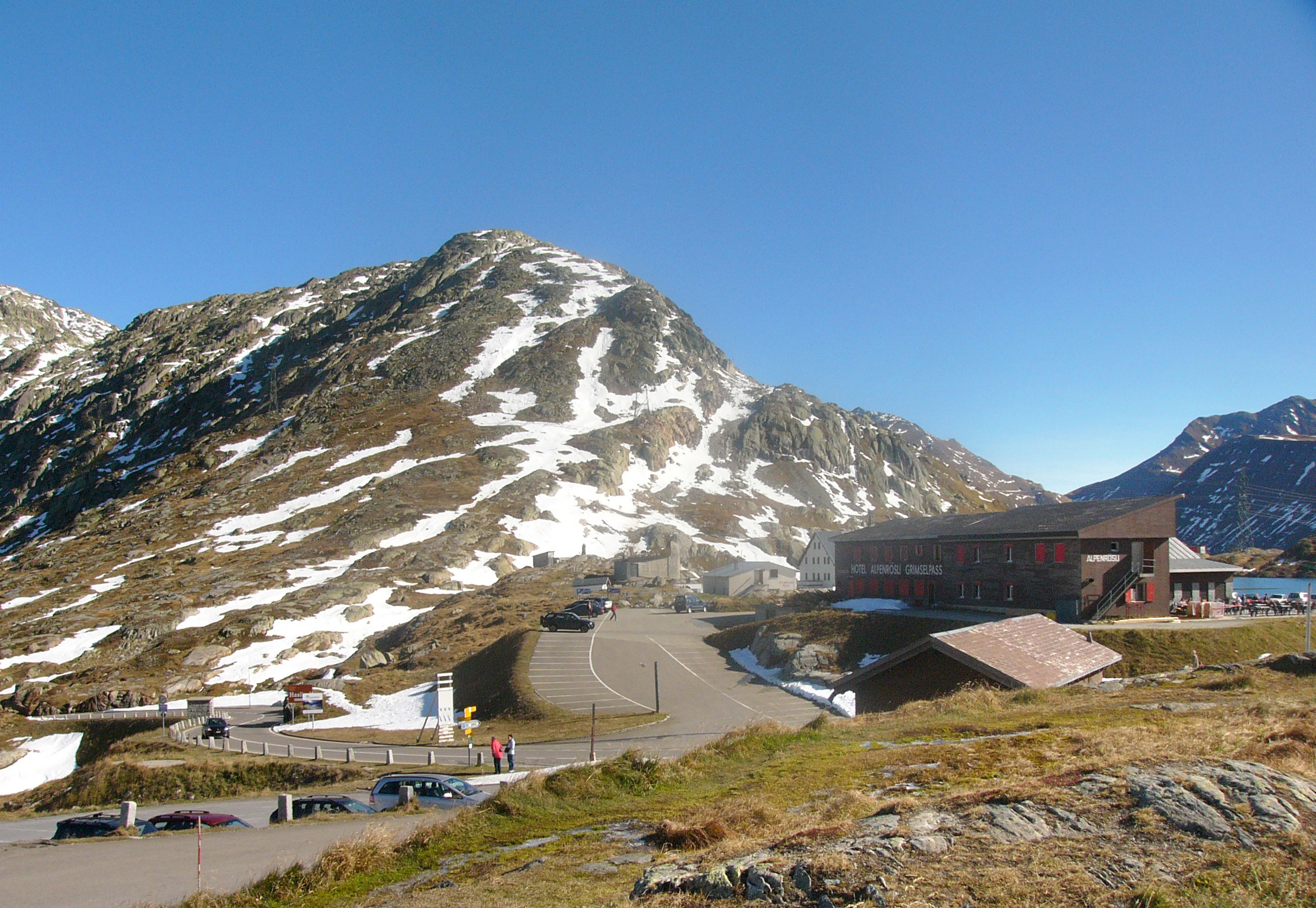
- The summit of the pass

- Location within Switzerland
- Elevation: 2,164 metres (7,100 ft)

Third Approach
- Location: Bern/Valais, Switzerland
- Range: Alps
- Coordinates: 46°33′42″N 8°20′43″E

The Grimsel Pass (German: Grimselpass; French: Col du Grimsel; Italian: Passo del Grimsel) is a mountain pass in Switzerland, crossing the Bernese Alps at an elevation of 2,163 metres (7,096 ft). The pass connects the Haslital, the upper valley of the river Aare, with the upper valley of the Rhône. In so doing, and as the Aare is a tributary of the Rhine, the pass crosses the continental divide between the North Sea and the Mediterranean Sea.

A paved road follows the pass, running 38 kilometres (24 mi) from Gletsch to Meiringen. The road is normally closed between October and May, due to the high snowfall on the pass. As it is the only direct road pass between the cantons of Bern and Valais across the Bernese Alps, attempts are made to keep the road open as long as possible with snow ploughs. A PostBus Switzerland service uses the pass several times a day, connecting Meiringen and Oberwald.

The Grimsel Pass road is part of the Aare Route, which is national cycle route 8 of Switzerland. It has been used on several occasions by the Tour de Suisse.

== History ==
The first fully documented use of the Grimsel Pass dates back to the 14th century, although it has been suggested that the pass was used in Roman times and also, in 1211, by troops of Berthold V, Duke of Zähringen. In 1397, the Landschaften of Pomat, Goms and Hasli, and the cities of Interlaken, Thun and Bern, signed an agreement in which it was agreed to provide for free and secure trade by the mule track over the Grimsel. In 1400, the hospice on the pass is mentioned for the first time.

The Grimsel Pass formed, along with the Nufenen and Gries passes, a regional trade route between the Haslital and Domodossola and the Lombardy plain. Cheese and cattle were sent south, whilst wine, rice, corn and olive oil came north. This trade continued until the opening of the Gotthard railway in 1882.

The track over the pass was not upgraded to a paved road until 1894. Between the 1920s and the 1950s, several hydroelectric power plants were constructed in the area around the pass by Kraftwerke Oberhasli (KWO), which resulted in the expansion and diversion of the pass road. The KWO now promotes the pass and surrounding area as a visitor attraction, as part of its Grimselwelt tourism brand.

== Geography ==
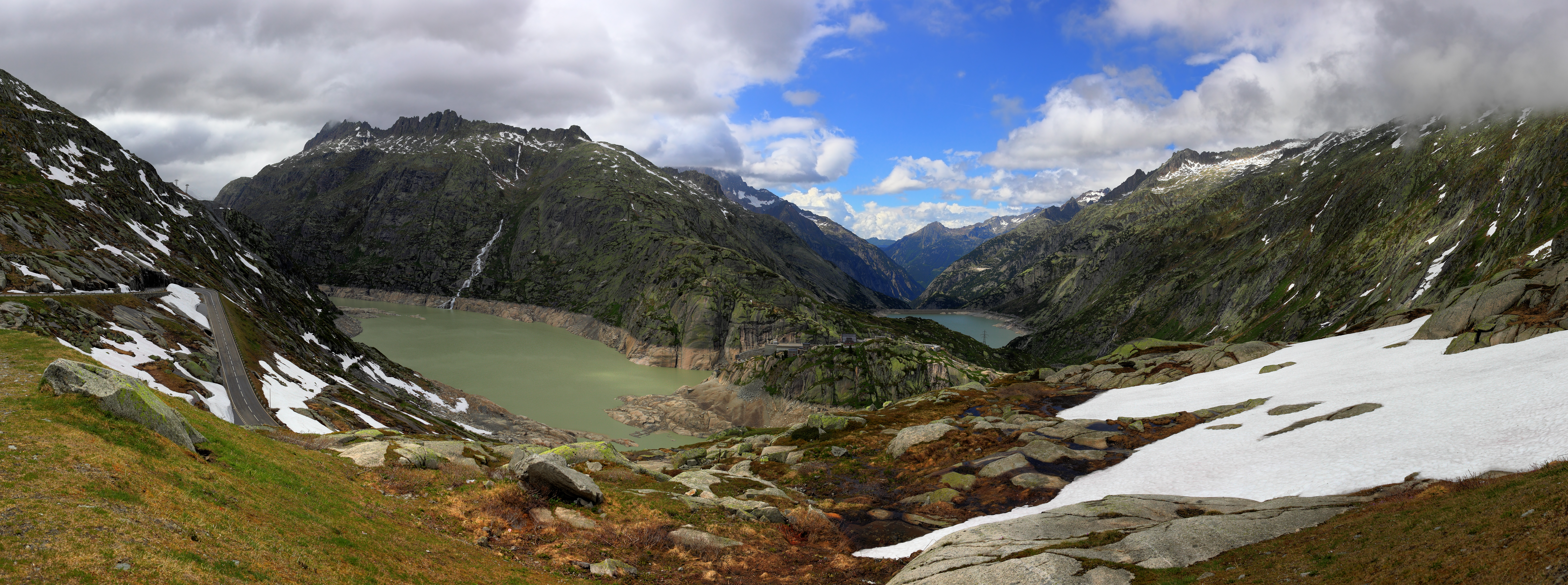
View from the summit of the pass looking north over the Grimselsee, Grimsel Hospice and Räterichsbodensee

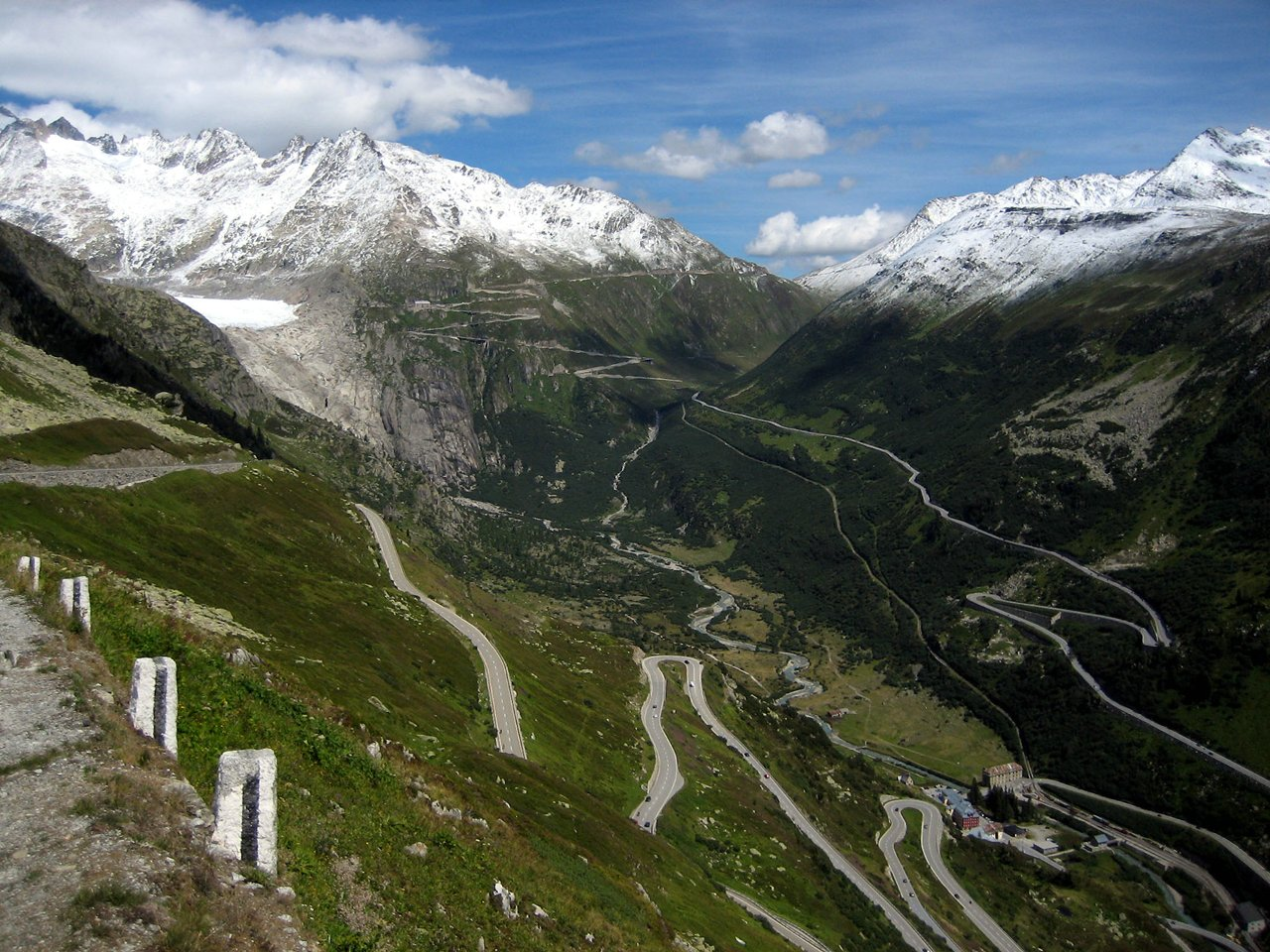
View from the summit of the pass looking east with Gletsch in the valley below, and the Furka Pass climbing the opposite side

The Grimsel Pass connects the cantons of Bern, to the north, and Valais, to the south, with the summit of the pass lying on the cantonal boundary. The northern slopes of the pass are in the Bernese municipality of Guttannen, whilst the southern slopes are within the Valais municipality of Obergoms.

The approach to the Grimsel Pass from the north commences in the small town of Meiringen (595 metres or 1,952 feet), from where access is possible down the Aare valley to Interlaken and Bern, and across the Brünig Pass to Obwalden and Lucerne. The approach passes the village of Innertkirchen (625 metres or 2,051 feet), where the road to the Susten Pass diverges, and continues alongside the Aare to Guttannen (1,057 metres or 3,468 feet).

Beyond Guttannen, and still following the river, the road passes a pair of short tunnels to Handegg (1,378 metres or 4,521 feet), where the lower station of the Gelmerbahn funicular, the steepest in Switzerland, is located. After Handegg the road climbs through several hairpin bends and an 850 metres (2,790 ft) tunnel to the Räterichsbodensee reservoir. A further climb brings the road to the Grimselsee reservoir and the Grimsel Hospice (1,980 metres or 6,500 feet). Here the final climb to the summit commences, with several more sweeping hairpin bends.

At the summit are several hotels and an extensive area of parking. Here the road runs alongside the Totesee (2,160 metres or 7,090 feet), a natural lake that has been enlarged into a reservoir. To the west of the pass and lake is the peak of the Sidelhorn (2,764 metres or 9,068 feet), whilst to the east is the mountain range Schafberg (2,481 metres or 8,140 feet).

From the Totesee the pass road descends steeply through more hairpin bends to Gletsch (1,759 metres or 5,771 feet) in the most upper valley of the Rhône, the Obergoms. Here connection is made with the Furka Pass, connecting with the canton of Uri, as well as the lower level route down the Rhône valley towards Brig through the Goms. A short distance down the Goms are Oberwald (1,377 metres or 4,518 feet) and Ulrichen (1,346 metres or 4,416 feet). At the latter, a junction is made with Nufenen Pass, into the canton of Ticino, and the Gries Pass, to Domodossola in Italy.

=== Climate ===
Due to the high altitude of the pass, and its continental location, the climate is cool or cold all year round, and receives a fair amount of precipitation year-round (the majority of which is snow). Snow usually falls from late September until late June, although during cool spells, it can snow at the height of summer. Most years, permanent snow fields remain at the pass, due to the temperature rarely rising above 15 °C (59 °F). This area has a long winter season, with little precipitation mostly in the form of snow, and low humidity. The Köppen climate classification classifies the climate here as subarctic, and abbreviates this as Dfc.

Climate data for Grimsel Hospiz: 1980m (1991–2020)
Month	Jan	Feb	Mar	Apr	May	Jun	Jul	Aug	Sep	Oct	Nov	Dec	Year
Mean daily maximum °C (°F)	−1.8 (28.8)	−2.0 (28.4)	0.3 (32.5)	3.0 (37.4)	7.3 (45.1)	11.4 (52.5)	13.2 (55.8)	13.3 (55.9)	9.7 (49.5)	6.8 (44.2)	1.7 (35.1)	−0.9 (30.4)	5.2 (41.4)
Daily mean °C (°F)	−4.5 (23.9)	−4.9 (23.2)	−2.6 (27.3)	0.2 (32.4)	4.3 (39.7)	8.2 (46.8)	10.2 (50.4)	10.3 (50.5)	6.9 (44.4)	4.0 (39.2)	−0.7 (30.7)	−3.5 (25.7)	2.3 (36.1)
Mean daily minimum °C (°F)	−7.4 (18.7)	−7.9 (17.8)	−5.5 (22.1)	−2.7 (27.1)	1.3 (34.3)	4.9 (40.8)	7.0 (44.6)	7.3 (45.1)	4.2 (39.6)	1.4 (34.5)	−3.1 (26.4)	−6.2 (20.8)	−0.6 (30.9)
Average precipitation mm (inches)	190 (7.5)	163 (6.4)	169 (6.7)	150 (5.9)	159 (6.3)	127 (5.0)	126 (5.0)	139 (5.5)	129 (5.1)	129 (5.1)	168 (6.6)	184 (7.2)	1,834 (72.2)
Average snowfall cm (inches)	177 (70)	180 (71)	177 (70)	134 (53)	69 (27)	12 (4.7)	2 (0.8)	3 (1.2)	19 (7.5)	51 (20)	142 (56)	181 (71)	1,147 (452)
Average precipitation days (≥ 1.0 mm)	12.1	11.8	13.2	12.5	13.9	14.6	13.4	13.8	11.3	10.8	11.6	12.7	151.7
Average snowy days (≥ 1.0 cm)	13.4	13.5	14.1	11.6	6.2	1.5	0.4	0.3	2.3	5.5	11.1	14.1	94.0
Average relative humidity (%)	65	67	72	74	76	77	77	76	77	71	71	67	72
Mean monthly sunshine hours	72	95	129	123	135	158	178	169	140	115	64	57	1,435
Percentage possible sunshine	49	48	45	39	38	44	49	50	48	47	41	44	45
Source: MeteoSwiss

== See also ==
- List of highest paved roads in Europe
- List of mountain passes
