= List of funiculars in Switzerland =

This is a list of all funiculars in Switzerland, commercially operated according to a timetable.

Abbr	Name	Location	Length		Height difference		Gradient Max %
Abbr	Name	Location	Metres	Feet	Metres	Feet	Gradient Max %
asm	Tessenberg Bahn	Ligerz - Prêles (Tessenberg)	1,183	3,881	384	1,260	40
BB	Bürgenstock-Bahn	Kehrsiten - Bürgenstock	944	3,097	445	1,460	58
BE	Funiculaire Bienne–Evilard	Biel/Bienne (City - Leubringen/Evilard)	933	3,061	242	794	
BLM	Grütschalpbahn (removed 2006)	Lauterbrunnen BLM - Grütschalp (Mürren)	1,420	4,660	696	2,283	
BM	Magglingenbahn	Biel/Bienne (City - Magglingen/Macolin)	1,681	5,515	438	1,437	32
BrB	Braunwaldbahn	Linthal BrB - Braunwald	1,376	4,514	605	1,985	64
BUIC	Chäserrugg-Bahn	Unterwasser - Iltios	1,209	3,967	428	1,404	46
CG	Funiculaire Cossonay–Gare–Ville	Cossonay (Station - Town)	1,228	4,029	133	436	13
DIH	Heimwehfluhbahn	Interlaken - Heimwehfluh	186	610	102	335	69
DMB	Marzilibahn	Bern (City - Marzili)	105	344	32	105	32
DPB	Parsenn Bahn	Davos (Dorf - Weissfluhjoch)	1,860	6,100	662	2,172	47
DSB	Schatzalp-Bahn	Davos (Platz - Schatzalp)	712	2,336	300	980	47
FLMS	Funicolare Locarno–Madonna del Sasso	Locarno (City - Madonna del Sasso)	825	2,707	173	568	30
FMB	Funicolare Cassarate–Monte Brè	Lugano (Cassarate - Monte Brè)	1,621	5,318	660	2,170	60
FR	Funicolare del Ritom	Piotta - Ritom	1,369	4,491	786	2,579	87
FüB	Fürigenbahn	Harissenbucht (Stansstad) - Fürigen	276	906	201	659	73
GB	Gurtenbahn	Bern (Wabern - Gurten Kulm)	1,059	3,474	266	873	34
GB	Gütschbahn	Luzern - Gütsch	173	568	84	276	
GbB	Giessbachbahn	Lake Brienz - Grand Hotel Giessbach	345	1,132	90	300	32
HB	Harderbahn	Interlaken - Harder Kulm	1,435	4,708	727	2,385	
KSB	Standseilbahn Kriens–Sonnenberg	Kriens - Sonnenberg	839	2,753	210	690	42
KWO	Gelmerbahn	Handegg - Gelmersee	1,028	3,373	448	1,470	106
LSF	Metro Alpin	Saas Fee (Felskinn - Mittelallalin)	1,473	4,833	465	1,526	
MMB	Muottas-Muragl-Bahn	Punt Muralg - Muottas Muragl	2,199	7,215	709	2,326	54
MS	Funicolare Monte San Salvatore	Lugano (Paradiso - Monte San Salvatore)	1,658	5,440	601	1,972	61
MVR	Chemin de fer funiculaire Territet–Glion	Montreux (Territet - Glion)	640	2,100	301	988	
MVR	Chemin de fer funiculaire Vevey–Chardonne–Mont Pèlerin	Vevey - Chardonne - Mont-Pèlerin	1,578	5,177	417	1,368	54
MVR	Chemin de fer Les Avants–Sonloup	Les Avants - Sonloup	532	1,745	184	604	54
NB	Niesenbahn	Mülenen - Niesen Kulm	3,499	11,480	1,643	5,390	68
PBZ	Polybahn	Zürich (Central - Hochschulen)	176	577	41	135	23
RfB	Reichenbachfall-Bahn	Meiringen (Willigen) - Reichenbach Falls	714	2,343	244	801	58
SMA	Allmendhubelbahn	Mürren - Almendhubel	551	1,808	258	846	61
SMBB	Standseilbahn St. Moritz–Corviglia	St. Moritz - Chantarella - Corviglia	4,555	14,944	1,247	4,091	45
SMC	Funiculaire Sierre–Montana–Crans	Sierre/Siders - Montana-Vermala	4,191	13,750	927	3,041	48
SMtS	Funiculaire Saint-Imier-Mont-Soleil	St-Imier - Mont-Soleil	740	2,430	351	1,152	60
SSSF	Stoosbahn	Schwyz - Stoos	1,383	4,537	744	2,441	110
SthB	Stanserhorn-Bahn	Stans - Stanserhorn	1,550	5,090	264	866	17
TBB	Thunersee–Beatenberg Bahn	Beatenbucht - Beatenberg	1,695	5,561	556	1,824	41
TLT	Funiculaire St-Luc Chandolin	St-Luc - Tignousa	1,275	4,183	498	1,634	55
TMF	Funiculaire Territet–Mont Fleuri	Montreux (Territet - Mont Fleuri)	432	1,417	190	620	
TN	Funiculaire Ecluse Plan	Neuchâtel (Ecluse - Plan)	391	1,283	110	360	38
TN	Funiculaire La Coudre Chaumont	Neuchâtel (La Coudre - Chaumont)	2,091	6,860	570	1,870	46
TN	Fun'ambule	Neuchâtel (Gare - Université)	315	1,033	48	157	34
TPF	Fribourg funicular	Fribourg-Neuveville - St-Pierre	121	397	60	200	55
TPFM	Funiculaire Moléson sur Gruyères	Moléson-Village - Plan-Francey	1,368	4,488	409	1,342	
TPL	Funicolare Lugano Città–Stazione	Lugano (City - Station)	206	676	50	160	25
TSB	Treib–Seelisberg-Bahn	Treib - Seelisberg	1,149	3,770	332	1,089	38
TTE	Funiculaire Châtelard - Château d'Eau	Le Châtelard VS - Château-d'Eau	1,306	4,285	692	2,270	87
TTE	Minifunic d'Emosson	Petit train - Emosson Lake	261	856	140	460	72
VBSG	Mühleggbahn	St. Gallen (Stadtmitte - St. Georgen)	317	1,040	68	223	
VBZ	Seilbahn Rigiblick	Zürich (Universitätsstrasse - Rigiblick)	385	1,263	96	315	36
ZBB	Zugerbergbahn	Zug (Schönegg - Zugerberg)	1,261	4,137	366	1,201	47
ZSB	SunneggaExpress	Zermatt - Sunnegga - Rothorn	1,590	5,220	690	2,260	63

== See also ==
- List of funicular railways
- List of heritage railways and funiculars in Switzerland
- List of aerial tramways in Switzerland
- List of mountain railways in Switzerland
- List of mountains of Switzerland accessible by public transport
