= Le Châtelard, Valais =

Swiss village

Coordinates: 46°03′44″N 6°57′31″E

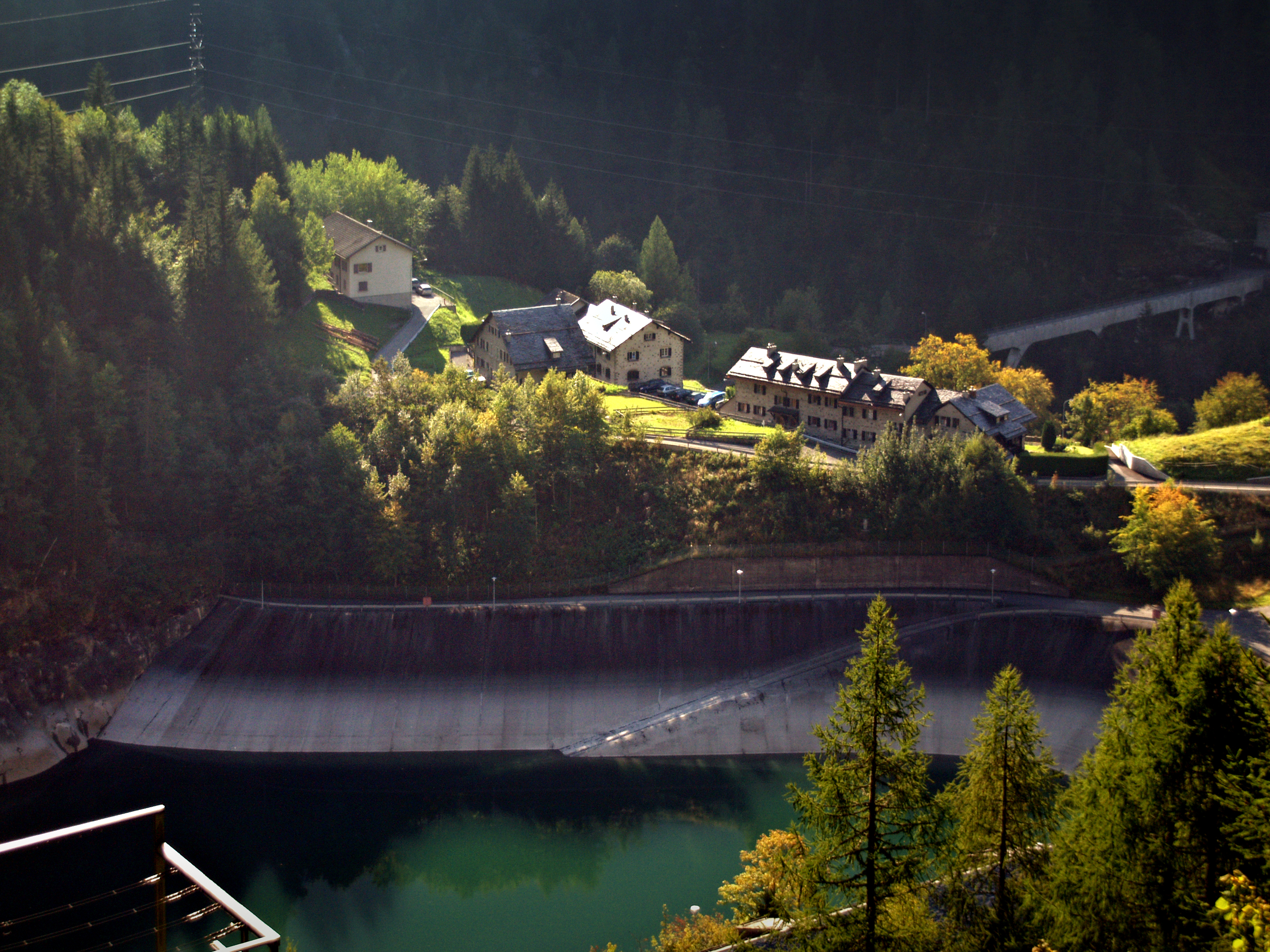
View of Finhaut Le Châtelard village at night

Le Châtelard (altitude 1,120 m or 3,675 ft) is a locality in the canton of Valais, Switzerland near the border with France. It is part of the municipality of Finhaut.

== Transportation ==
The 1,000 mm (3 ft 3 3/8 in) metre gauge Chemin de Fer de Martigny au Châtelard and Ligne de Saint Gervais - Vallorcine make an end to end connection here. There is a road from Martigny via the Forclaz pass. This Road continues across the French border to Vallorcine and then beyond to Chamonix.

From Le Châtelard, Funiculaire du Châtelard and Mini-Funiculaire d'Emosson lead to Lac d'Émosson.
