= Col de la Forclaz =

Mountain pass in the Swiss Alps

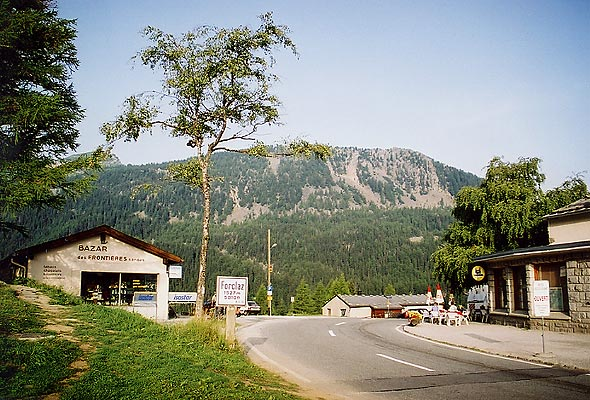

- Location within Switzerland
- Elevation: 1,527 m (5,010 ft)
- Traversed by: Road

Third Approach
- Location: Valais, Switzerland
- Range: Alps
- Coordinates: 46°03′32″N 7°00′08″E

Col de la Forclaz (el. 1,527 m or 5,010 ft) is a mountain pass in the Alps in the Canton of Valais in Switzerland. It connects Martigny at 471 m (1,545 ft) and Le Châtelard (Finhaut). The road from Martigny to the Col has an average gradient of 6% but in parts is closer to 8%. After the Col, and Le Châtelard, the road leads to Chamonix in France via Vallorcine and the Col des Montets.

The pass was little known in the 19th century. It was not until the rise in tourism, particularly in Chamonix, that the region became a popular tourist area.

== History ==
The pass was originally a track used by mule teams and smugglers that zig-zagged up the mountain face from Martigny and over into France.

Construction on the road was begun in 1827 and the tunnel completed in 1836 (and expanded in 1905). The road was at first opened only to public transport and was not open to private vehicles until 1920. At the time, the pass was closed at night, and the speed limit was 18 km/h (11.2 mph).

Today, the pass is an important link to the tourist areas around the Mont Blanc. There is a restaurant and shop at the pass, and it is a popular destination for weekend excursions and bicycle and motorcycle tours. A number of trailheads at the pass invite hikers into the mountains (Arpille, Bovine, etc.) or to the foot of the nearby Trient Glacier.

The pass is generally open in winter, but together with the Col des Montets on the French side it can be closed in extreme weather and will frequently require snow chains and/or winter tires. In the event of closure, travellers who want to go to Chamonix must take the long detour around Lake Geneva. Conditions can be checked with Chamonix tourist office.

There is another connection from Martigny to France (by train only) through the Vallée du Trient (Gorges du Trient): the Martigny–Châtelard Railway/Saint-Gervais–Vallorcine railway via Chamonix.

== Tour de France ==
The pass has been used seven times in the Tour de France since 1947, most recently in 2016.

| Year | Stage | Category | Start | Finish | Leader at the summit |
|---|---|---|---|---|---|
| 2016 | 17 | 1 | Bern | Finhaut–Émosson | Rafał Majka (POL) |
| 1977 | 16 | 1 | Morzine | Chamonix | Antonio Menéndez (ESP) |
| 1969 | 9 | 1 | Thonon-les-Bains | Chamonix | Roger Pingeon (FRA) |
| 1966 | 18 | 1 | Ivrea | Chamonix | Edy Schütz (LUX) |
| 1963 | 17 | 1 | Val d'Isère | Chamonix | Federico Bahamontès (ESP) |
| 1959 | 19 | 2 | St. Vincent-d'Aoste | Annecy | Gérard Saint (FRA) |
| 1948 | 15 | 2 | Aix-les-Bains | Lausanne | Apo Lazaridès (FRA) |

== See also ==
- List of highest paved roads in Europe
- List of mountain passes
- List of the highest Swiss passes
