= Heimwehfluhbahn =

Funicular railway at Interlaken, Canton of Bern, Switzerland

Coordinates: 46.6758°N 7.8503°E

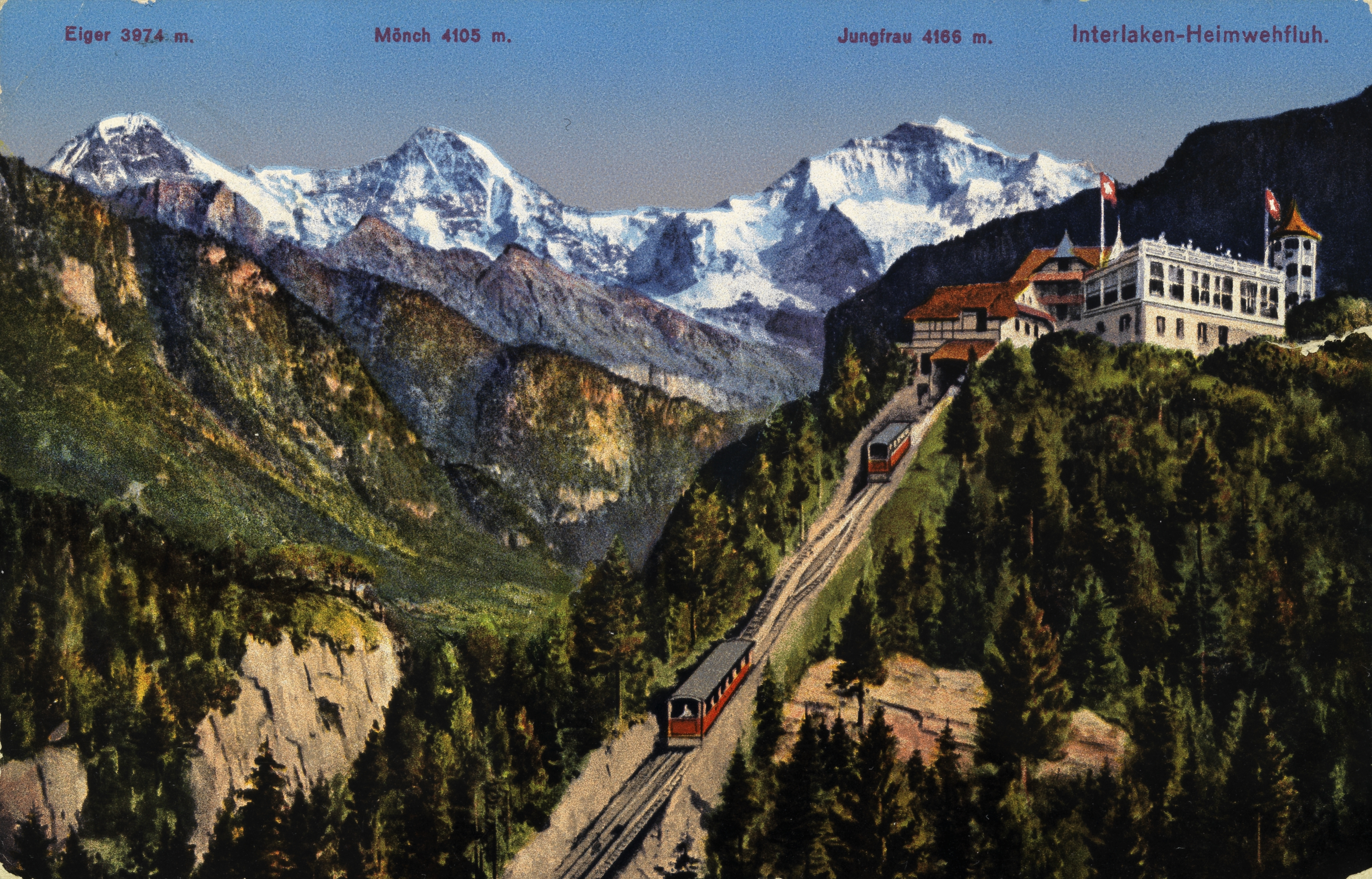
- The funicular with Eiger, Mönch and Jungfrau (postcard sent 1918)

Overview
- Other name(s): Drahtseilbahn Interlaken–Heimwehfluh
- Status: In operation
- Owner: Drahtseilbahn Interlaken-Heimwehfluh AG
- Locale: Canton of Bern, Switzerland
- Termini: "Interlaken (Heimwehfluhbahn)"; "Heimwehfluh"
- Stations: 2

Service
- Type: Funicular
- Route number: 2360
- Operator(s): Drahtseilbahn Interlaken-Heimwehfluh AG
- Rolling stock: 2

History
- Opened: 21 July 1906 (119 years ago)

Technical
- Line length: 197 m (646 ft)
- Number of tracks: 1 with passing loop
- Track gauge: 1,000 mm (3 ft 3 3/8 in)
- Electrification: from opening
- Highest elevation: 662 m (2,172 ft)
- Maximum incline: 59%

The Heimwehfluhbahn (DIH) is a funicular at Interlaken in the Swiss Canton of Bern. It runs to the top of the nearby Heimwehfluh hill at an altitude of 680 metres (2,230 ft) above sea level. The funicular provides access to the hilltop restaurant, an observation tower, an O scale model railway, a children's playground and a bobsleigh run (a second one existed but has since become overgrown and unused).

== Overview ==
The funicular, built between 1904 and 1906, has a length of 197 metres (646 ft) and overcomes a vertical distance of 102 metres (335 ft) with a maximum gradient of 69%. There are two wooden cars dating from 1906, operating on a single track of narrow gauge track with a central passing loop. With curtains at the unglazed windows, the line presents an intentionally heritage image. A single journey takes 2 minutes.

== See also ==
- List of funicular railways
- List of funiculars in Switzerland
- List of heritage railways and funiculars in Switzerland
