= Braunwaldbahn =

Funicular railway in the canton of Glarus, Switzerland

Coordinates: 46.933972°N 9.000764°E

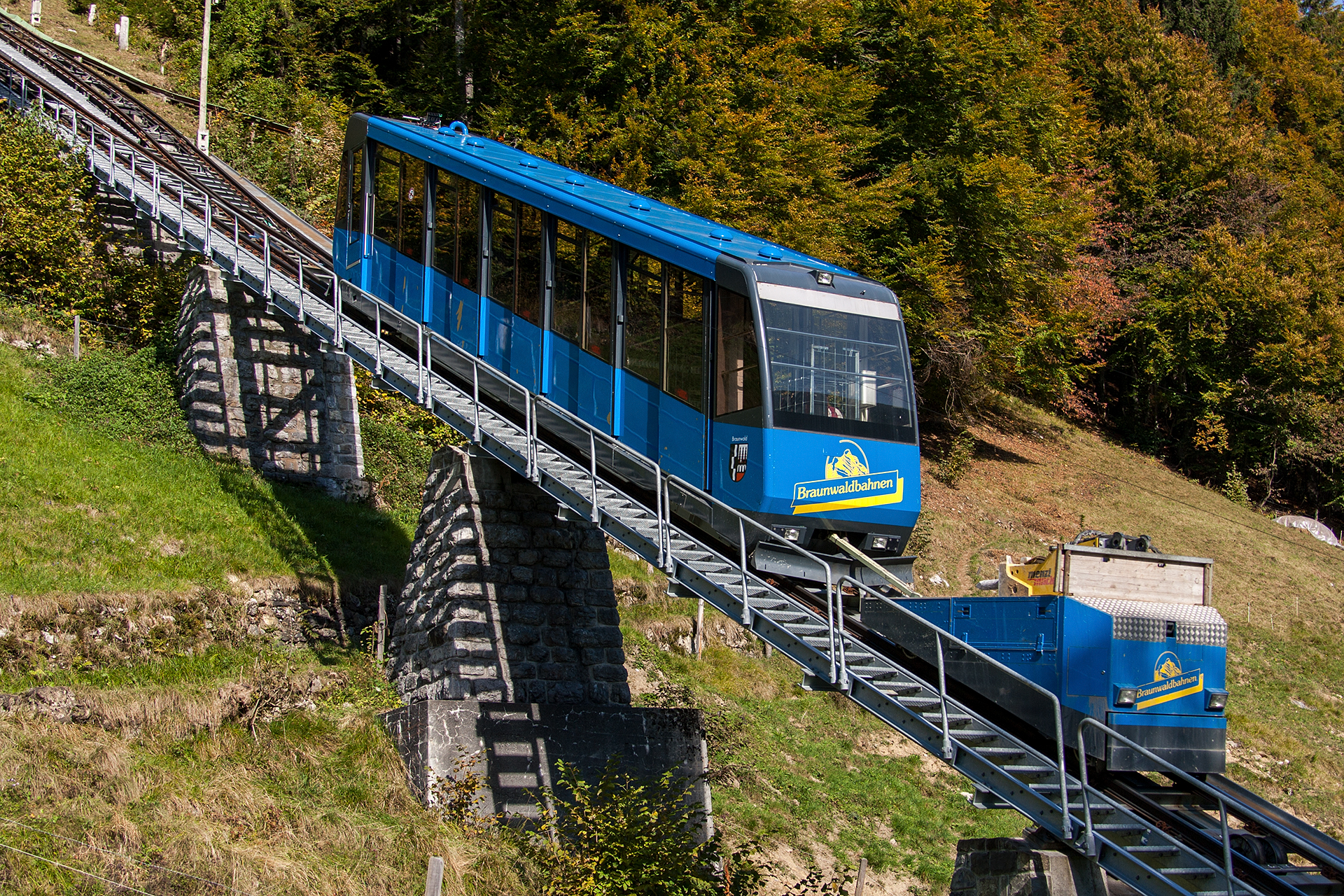

Overview
- Other name(s): Braunwald-Standseilbahn
- Status: In operation
- Owner: Braunwald-Standseilbahn AG (since 1994), Braunwaldbahn AG (1905-1994)
- Locale: Canton of Glarus, Switzerland
- Termini: "Linthal Braunwaldbahn"; "Braunwald"
- Stations: 2
- Website: https://braunwald.ch/de/planen-buchen/bergbahnen/standseilbahn.html

Service
- Type: Funicular
- Route number: 2840
- Operator(s): Braunwald-Standseilbahn AG
- Rolling stock: 2 for 114 passengers each

History
- Opened: 6 August 1907 (118 years ago)
- all year service: 1928

Technical
- Track length: 1,367 metres (4,485 ft)
- Number of tracks: 1 with passing loop
- Track gauge: Metre (3 ft 3 3/8 in)
- Electrification: from opening
- Highest elevation: 1,254 m (4,114 ft)
- Maximum incline: 64%

The Braunwaldbahn, Braunwald-Standseilbahn (BRSB), or Braunwald Funicular, is a funicular railway in the canton of Glarus, Switzerland. The line links Linthal Braunwaldbahn station, on the Swiss Federal Railways' Weesen to Linthal line, with the car-free resort of Braunwald on the mountain 605 m (1,985 ft) above.

The line was opened in 1907. During a major maintenance project in November 2023, service was temporarily replaced by a two-minute helicopter shuttle between the two stops on the Braunwaldbahn. The normal fare was charged to passengers on the shuttle flight, which had four seats and a priority system for local residents, workers, and students.

== Operation ==
The line is operated by the Braunwald-Standseilbahn AG and has the following parameters:

| Feature | Value |
|---|---|
| Number of cars | 2 |
| Number of stops | 2 |
| Configuration | Single track with passing loop |
| Track length | 1,367 metres (4,485 ft) |
| Rise | 605 metres (1,985 ft) |
| Maximum gradient | 64% |
| Track gauge | 1,000 mm (3 ft 3 3/8 in) metre gauge |

== See also ==
- List of funicular railways
- List of funiculars in Switzerland
