= Col des Montets =

Mountain pass in the French Alps

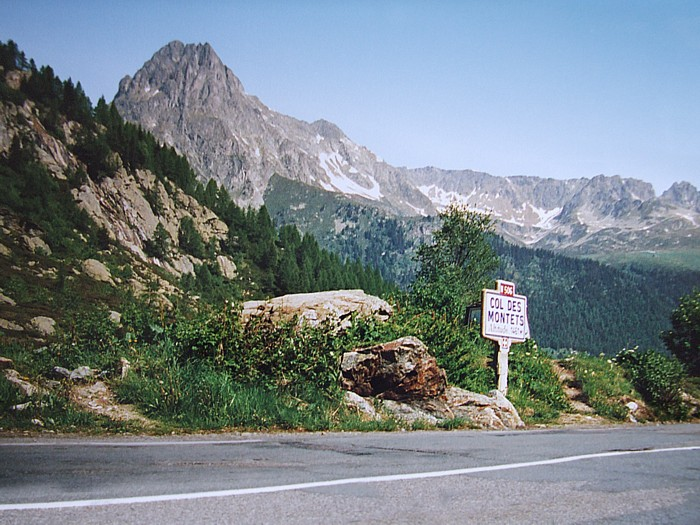
- Interactive map of Col des Montets
- Elevation: 1,461 m (4,793 ft)

Third Approach
- Location: Haute-Savoie, France
- Range: Alps
- Coordinates: 46°0′13″N 6°55′24″E

Col des Montets (elevation 1,461 m or 4,793 ft) is a mountain pass in the French Alps in the Haute-Savoie department of France. It is on the road between Chamonix, the Swiss Col de la Forclaz and Martigny in the canton of Valais, Switzerland.

The pass is generally open in winter, but it can be closed in extreme weather and frequently requires snow chains and/or winter tires. Conditions can be checked with Chamonix tourist office. The railway tunnel of the Saint-Gervais–Vallorcine railway has been modified to also carry road traffic on a convoy basis between trains when the pass is closed.

Elizabeth Robins Pennell bicycled through the pass in the 1890s.

The pass appeared in the Tour de France five times from 1959 to 1977: Charly Gaul was the first rider to cross the pass in 1959.

== See also ==
- List of highest paved roads in Europe
- List of mountain passes
