= Émosson Dam =

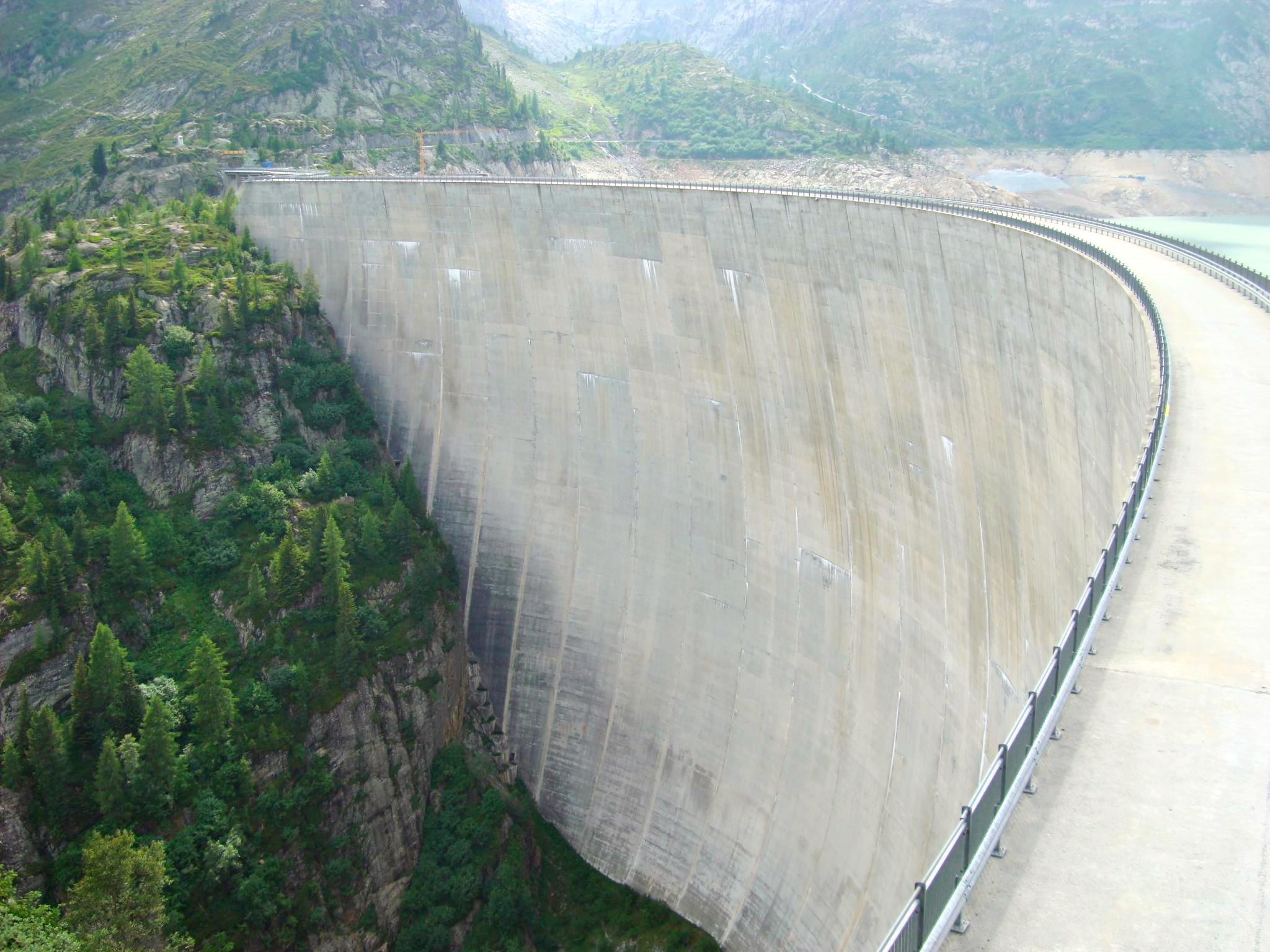
- The dam in 2011

- The location of the Émosson Dam in Switzerland
- Interactive map of Émosson Dam
- Official name: Barrage d'Émosson
- Country: Switzerland
- Location: Finhaut, Valais
- Coordinates: 46.06751°N 6.93220°E
- Purpose: Hydroelectric Power
- Status: Operational
- Construction began: 1967
- Opening date: 1972

Dam and spillways
- Type of dam: Arch dam
- Impounds: Barberine
- Height (foundation): 180 m (590 ft)
- Length: 560 m (1,840 ft)
- Width (base): 45 m (148 ft)

Reservoir
- Creates: Lac d'Émosson
- Total capacity: 227,000,000 m^{3} (8.0×10^{9} cu ft)
- Surface area: 327 ha (810 acres)
- Normal elevation: 1,931 m (6,335 ft)

Power Station
- Turbines: Vallorcine: 2 x Pelton-type; La Bâtiaz: 162 3 x Pelton-type, 1 x Francis-type
- Installed capacity: Vallorcine: 189 MW; La Bâtiaz: 162; Total: 351 MW
- Annual generation: 870 GWh

The Émosson Dam (French: Barrage d'Émosson) is a hydroelectric dam development located in Switzerland in the canton of Valais.

== History ==
A company (Électricité d'Émosson SA) was created in 1954 to build the dam. The Franco-Swiss development, because of the source of capital, uses different pumping water sites and power generation plants. The construction was decided in April 1967. Previously, a border change was made so that the work was entirely on Swiss territory. Indeed, the border would have cut the dam into two. The communes concerned therefore conducted an exchange of territories, endorsed in 1963. Work began in 1967, and commissioning took place in 1975, eight years later. There was already a first dam on the course of the Barberine, the Barberine Dam, owned by Swiss Federal Railways, for which it was necessary to obtain the authorisation to immerse the earlier structure in the reservoir of the new construction.

== Origin of the waters ==
Three collectors transport the water to the Émosson Dam.

The South Collector picks up the waters of the Argentière Glacier, the Tour Glacier and the Lognan Glacier, mainly by subglacial water intakes. A free flow gallery of 8.55 km (5.31 mi) length leads the water by gravity to a shielded well where the water crosses the Trient Valley and then rises, always by gravity to the dam.

The West Collector picks up the waters of the French vallies of Bérard and Tré-les-eaux. These waters are channelled by free-flow in a gallery of 7.95 km (4.94 mi) directly to the dam.

The East Collector captures waters of La Fouly and below the Trient Glacier and led by a gallery of more than 18 km (11 mi) long to the Esserts basin, hence the water is either turbined directly at the Vallorcine power station, or pumped into the Émosson reservoir.

== Location ==
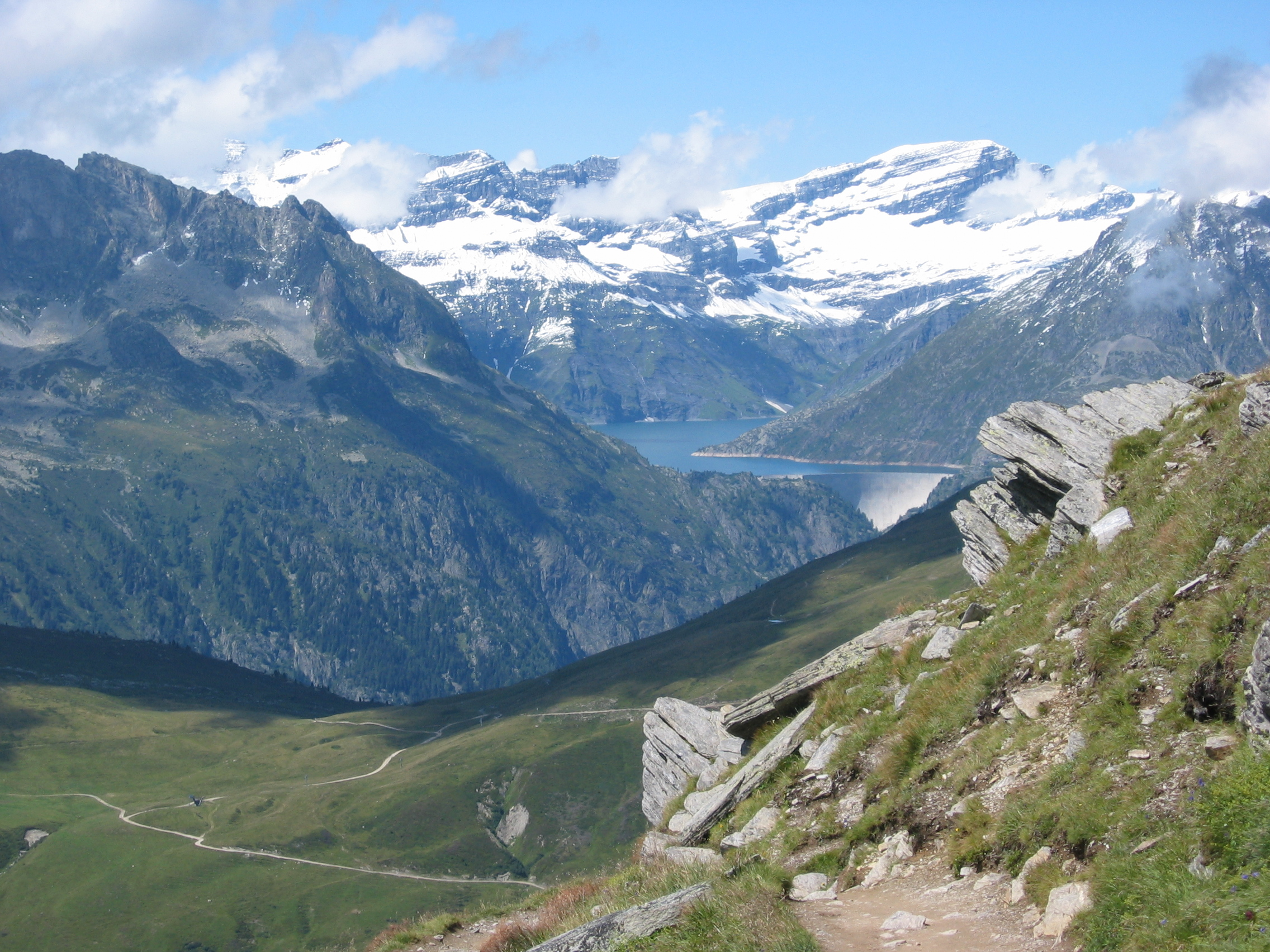
The Émosson Dam and the Lac d'Émosson, seen from the Col de Balme (French side).

The dam is located in the Canton of Valais, on the left bank of the Rhône above Martigny. It is fed by the waters of the Mont Blanc massif. The Émosson Dam is Switzerland's third highest dam after the Grande Dixence and Mauvoisin Dams.
