= Harderbahn =

Funicular railway at Interlaken, Switzerland

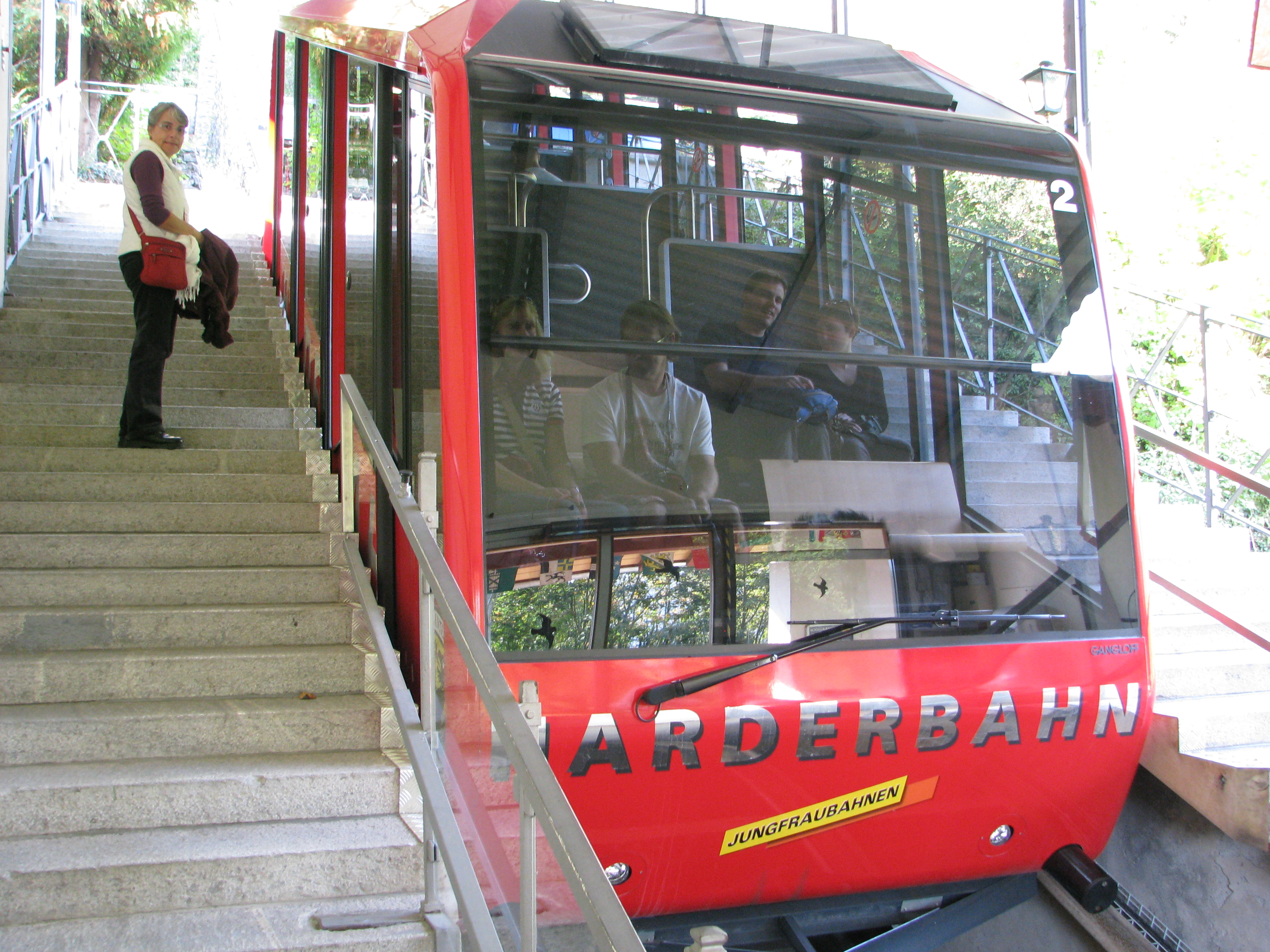
- Lower station in Interlaken (2012)

Overview
- Native name: Harderbahn
- Status: in operation during summer season
- Owner: Harderbahn AG
- Locale: Bernese Oberland, Switzerland
- Coordinates: 46.6959°N 7.8624°E
- Termini: "Interlaken Harderbahn" at Brienzstrasse 1 near Interlaken Ost railway station 46.69099°N 7.86543°E; "Harder Kulm" 46.69822°N 7.85504°E
- Stations: 2
- Website: HB

Service
- Type: funicular
- Services: 1
- Route number: 2361 (earlier: 1361)
- Operator: Harderbahn AG
- Rolling stock: 2 for 65 passengers each

History
- Opened: 15 May 1908 (118 years ago)
- Initial concession: 1890 for 80 years (mod. 1891, 1905, 1906)
- Enhancements: 1961, 1966, 1997, 2008
- Renewal of concession: 1969 for 50 years

Technical
- Line length: 1.435 km (0.892 mi)
- Track length: 1.447 km (0.899 mi)
- Number of tracks: single track with passing loop
- Character: Touristic mountain railway
- Track gauge: 1,000 mm (3 ft 3 3/8 in) metre gauge
- Electrification: Since opening
- Highest elevation: 1,305 m (4,281 ft)
- Maximum incline: 64%

The Harderbahn (HB) is one of two funiculars that operate from the town of Interlaken. The Harderbahn leads to the western end of the Harder in the north of Interlaken across the river Aare, in Switzerland.

This funicular, the longer of the two, runs in 10 minutes from the base station Interlaken Harderbahn (550 metres or 1,804 feet above sea level) to a 755-metre-higher (2,477 ft) station near the viewpoint Harderkulm (1,321 metres or 4,334 feet). From the Harder Kulm top station (1,305 metres or 4,281 feet), a five-minute walk leads to the Harderkulm viewpoint and the Restaurant Harder Kulm, a distinctive pagoda structure with views from its terrace, over the towns of Interlaken and Unterseen, the Lakes of Thun and Brienz, the valley of the Lütschine and the summits of the Eiger, Mönch and Jungfrau.

The line is owned by the Harderbahn AG, a subsidiary of the Jungfraubahn Holding AG, a holding company that also owns the Wengernalpbahn, Jungfraubahn, Bergbahn Lauterbrunnen–Mürren, and Firstbahn. Through that holding company it is part of the Allianz - Jungfrau Top of Europe marketing alliance, which also includes the separately owned Berner Oberland-Bahn and Schynige Platte-Bahn.

== History ==
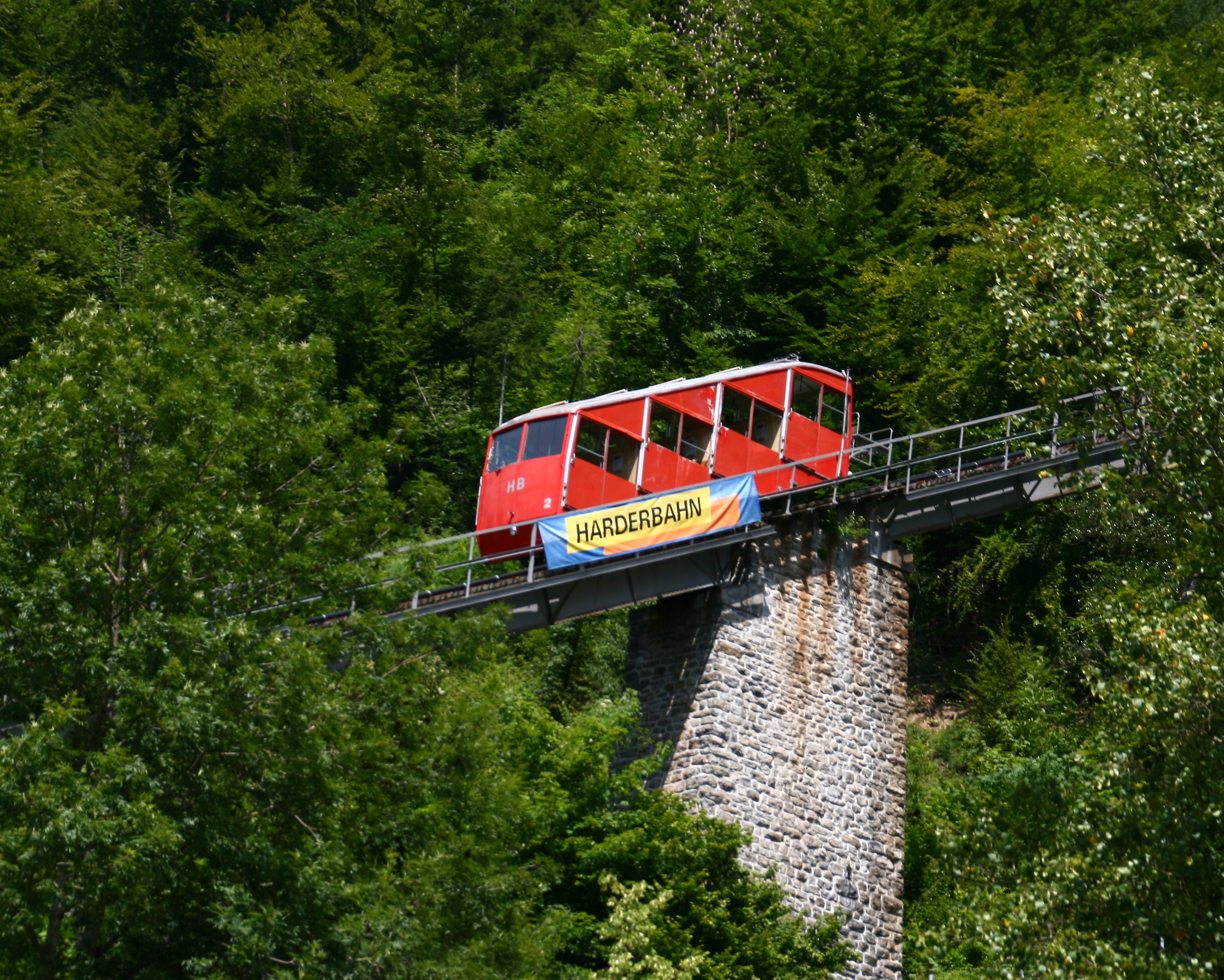
One of the 1966 built cars on the viaduct passing the alpine wildlife park (2007)

In 1890 Dr. Fritz Michel gained a concession to build an "electrical cable railway" on the Harder, to the north of the city of Interlaken, however financial backing for such a project was difficult to obtain and it was not until November 1905 that construction started and was to last for three years. In order not to disfigure the landscape the track was laid in a quadrant rather than a straight line, the usual format for such railways.

With the aid of Lausanne banker Ernest Chavannes and engineers Gaston Boiceau and Henri Muret the funicular opened on 15 May 1908. It has a length of 1,435 metres (4,708 ft) and climbs 734 metres (2,408 ft) from the lower station (Interlaken Harderbahn), situated near to Interlaken Ost train station (a five-minute walk), to the upper station (Harder Kulm) near the viewpoint. The journey takes ten minutes. A tourist attraction, an alpine wildlife park was opened in 1913 above the base station.

Modernisation of the funicular took place during the 1960s with a new engine and cable being installed in 1961, and new carriages coming to the line to commence operation on 14 May 1966. Until 1990 this had always been a summer only operation, but instead of closing at the end of September, the funicular continued through the winter. The funicular operates only a summer timetable, usually from mid-April to late October.

In 1997 the wire rope was replaced.

In 2008 the two passenger carriages were replaced.

== Operations ==
The line, with a gauge of 1,000 mm (3 ft 3 3/8 in) metre gauge, is single track with a single passing point and is operated by two coaches. Power supply is by a 400 V three-phase system and the line uses the Stromsystem Drehstrom which controls the passing of the cars safely.

== Passenger Vehicles ==
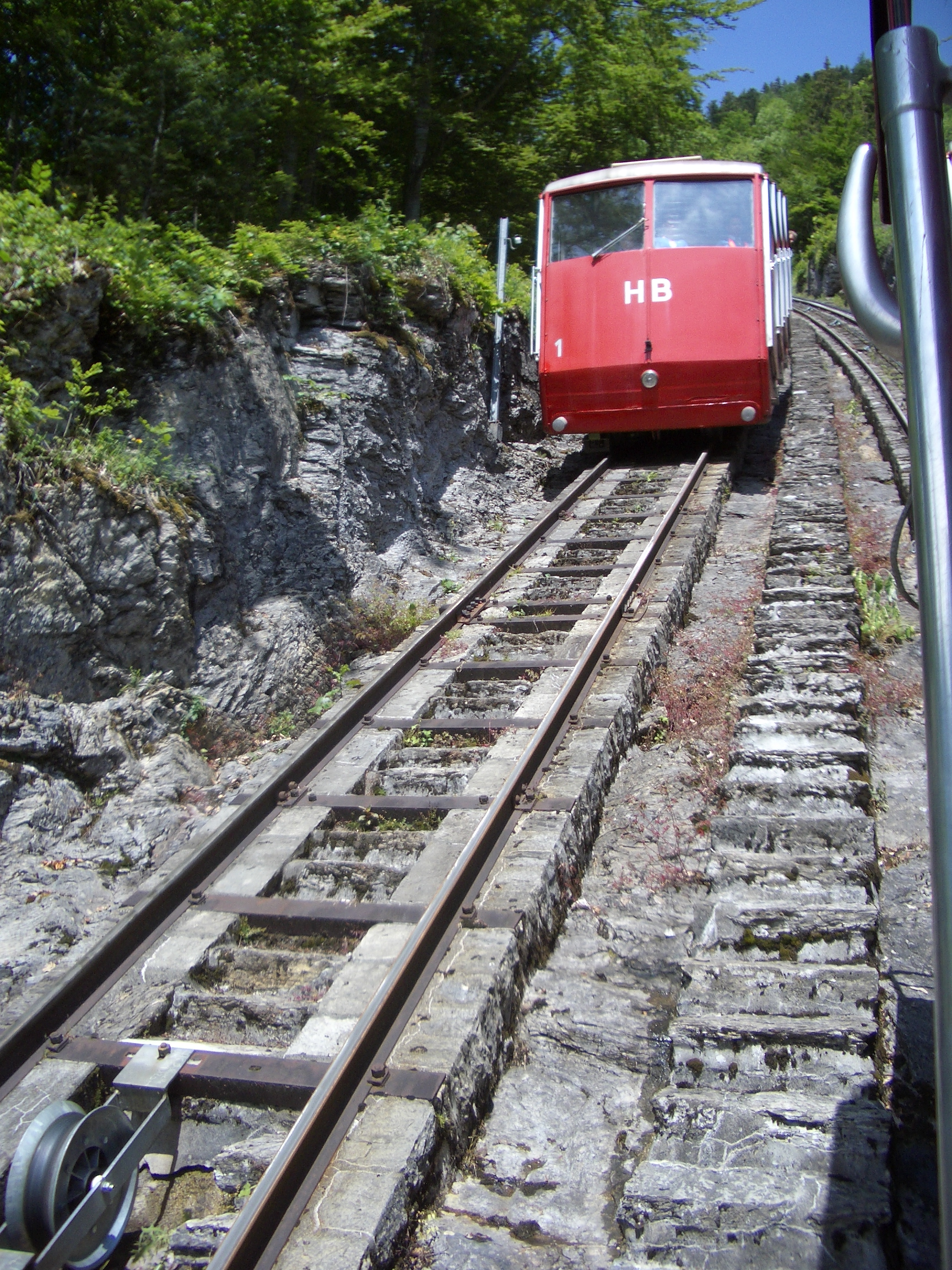
Vehicles at the passing loop (May 2007): No.1, the vehicle shown was that damaged in the incident of 9.8.2007.

Two new passenger cars, numbered 1 and 2, were delivered in 1966. these were constructed by specialist builders Carrossiere Gangloff AG of Bern with under frames, brakes etc., by the von Roll company. Each carry 62 passengers in four compartments. After over 40 years service it was decided that these would be in need of replacement prior to the centenary of the railway in 2008 and the order was placed. The need became essential following the damage to one of the cars from a mudslide caused by extreme weather on the night of 8–9 August 2007.

The new "centenary" coaches, in the line's usual red livery, were delivered on 13 March 2008. These were lifted onto the line from the alpine wildlife park in readiness for the commencement of the season. The new coaches were built by Gongloff Cabins AG of Bern and hold 65 persons in three sections. The doors are power operated and the downhill-facing section has an area of staged seating which is accessed through the compartment above, where the driver controls are located. The vehicles, numbered as with the previous set, now also carry names and crests; No.1 is named Interlaken, No.2 Unterseen. They have glass roof panels which allow uninterrupted views of the mountains and the valley below.

== See also ==
- List of funicular railways
- List of funiculars in Switzerland
