= Marzili Funicular =

Funicular in Bern, Switzerland

Marzilibahn
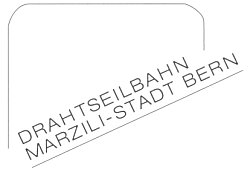

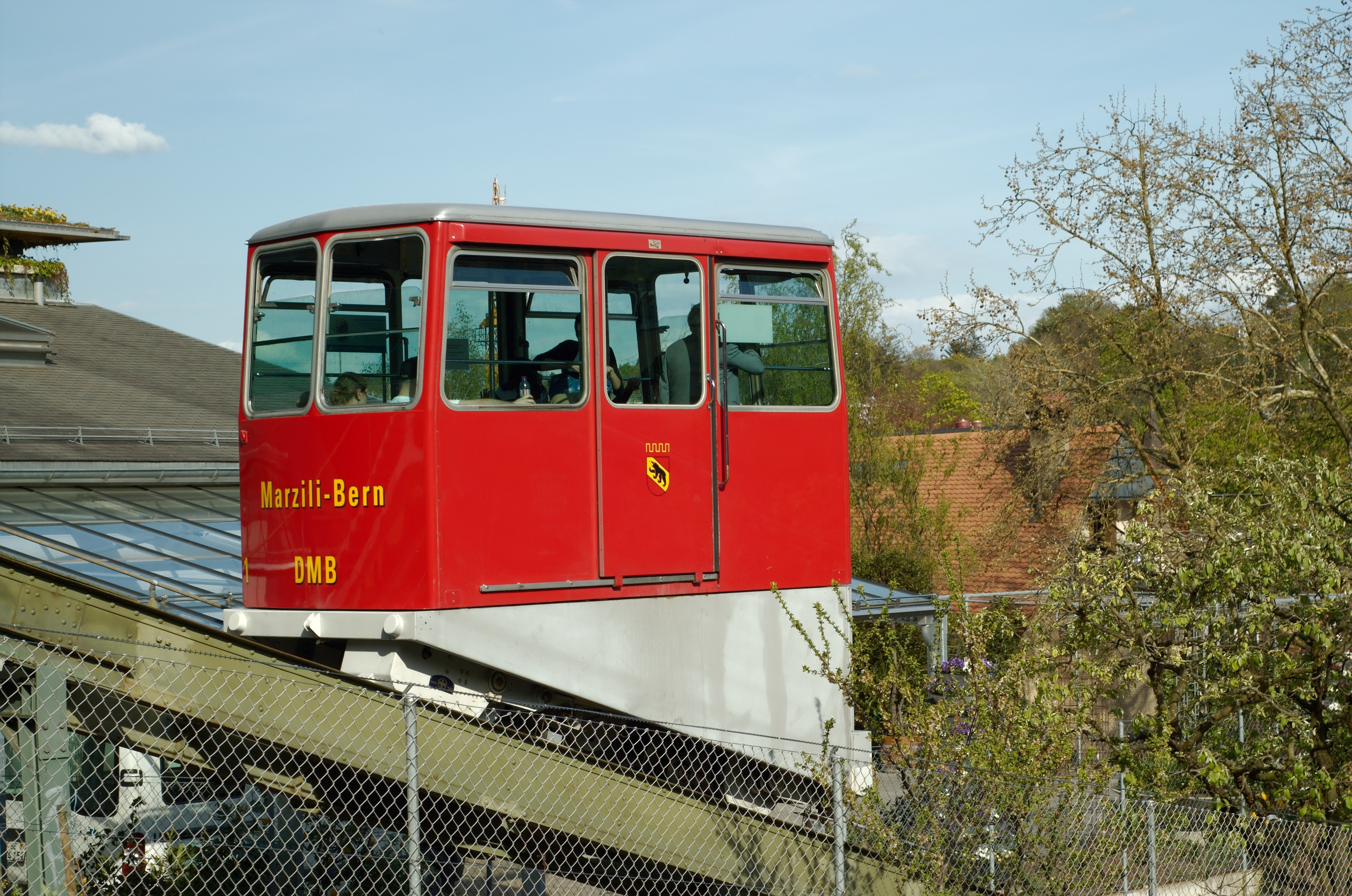
- A car (2008)

Overview
- Other name: Drahtseilbahn Marzili-Stadt Bern
- Status: In operation
- Locale: Bern, Switzerland
- Coordinates: 46°56′44″N 7°26′33″E
- Termini: "Bern Marzili"; "Bern (Marzilibahn)" near Federal Palace
- Stations: 2
- Website: www.marzilibahn.ch

Service
- Type: Funicular
- System: Libero, Bern area transport network
- Route number: 2350 (earlier: 1350)
- Operator(s): Drahtseilbahn Marzili-Stadt Bern AG
- Rolling stock: 2 for 40 passengers each

History
- Opened: 18 July 1885 (140 years ago)
- Concession: 1884
- Tracks changed: 1974

Technical
- Line length: 105 metres (115 yd)
- Number of tracks: 1 with passing loop
- Old gauge: 750 mm (2 ft 5 1/2 in)
- Electrification: 1974 (water counterbalancing before)
- Operating speed: 3 m/s (9.8 ft/s)
- Highest elevation: 540 m (1,770 ft)
- Maximum incline: 32%

The Marzilibahn, officially the Drahtseilbahn Marzili–Stadt Bern (Funicular Marzili–City of Bern) is a very short funicular in Bern, the capital of Switzerland. Its 105 m (344 ft) of track lead from the Marzili neighbourhood to the Bundeshaus, the seat of the Swiss federal government and parliament, in the Old City of Bern.

== History ==
The Marzilibahn was proposed by a committee of seven Bernese entrepreneurs, who received an 80-year operating license by the Swiss Federal Assembly on 13 December 1884. Construction began in March 1885 and was hastily completed to allow a start of operations on 19 July 1885, to coincide with the opening of the Eidgenössisches Schützenfest, the Swiss marksmen's festival, in Bern. As originally built, the tracks had a length of 112 metres (122 yd) and spanned a height difference of 31 metres (34 yd).

The cars were water-powered: a tank in the upper car was filled with up to 3.5 tonnes (3.4 long tons; 3.9 short tons) of water from the city stream (Stadtbach). This car, being heavier, then pulled the other one up the slope, after which the water would be drained and the process repeated with the other car. Up to thirty persons could be transported upwards in this manner. The descent was controlled by an operator on the forward platform on the upper car, who communicated with his colleague in the lower car by means of bell signals.

The original green cars, built by the local machine company Pümpin & Herzog (later part of Von Roll) were replaced in 1914 by a new set of cars on account of the Swiss national exhibition in Bern, and the official name of the funicular was changed from Drahtseilbahn Aarziele to Drahtseilbahn Marzili-Stadt Bern. Ticket prices ranged from 10 rappen at the time of the opening (the Federal Council had to forbid charging non-locals twice that much) to 30 rappen in 1973. The area around and below the raised steel tracks was a garden, cared for by the conductors.

In 1974, the line was converted to electric power, and a third generation of cars supplied. The two second generation cars are both preserved, one at the Swiss Museum of Transport in Lucerne and the other close to the lower station of the line.

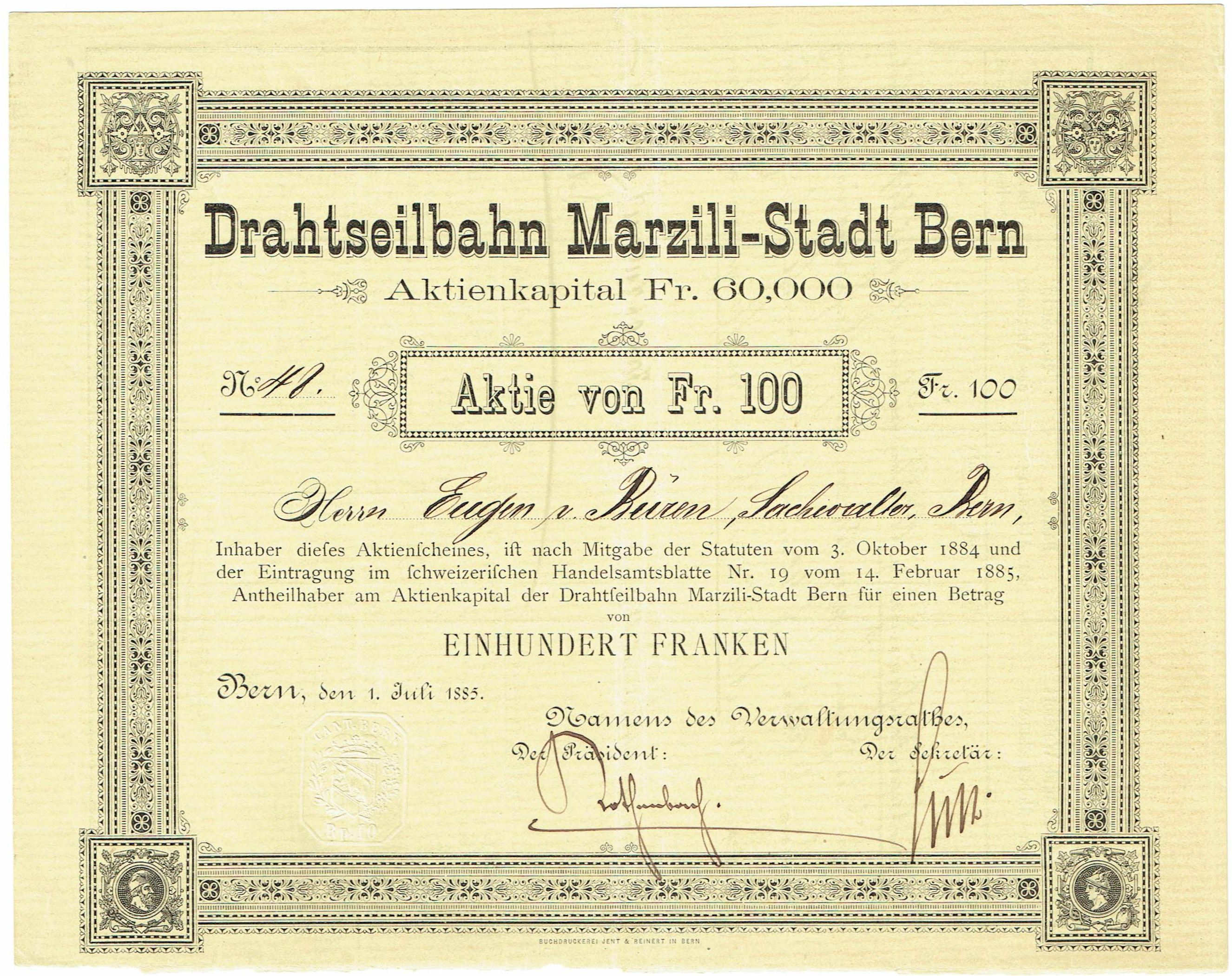
Founders share of the Drahtseilbahn Marzili-Stadt Bern, issued 1. July 1885

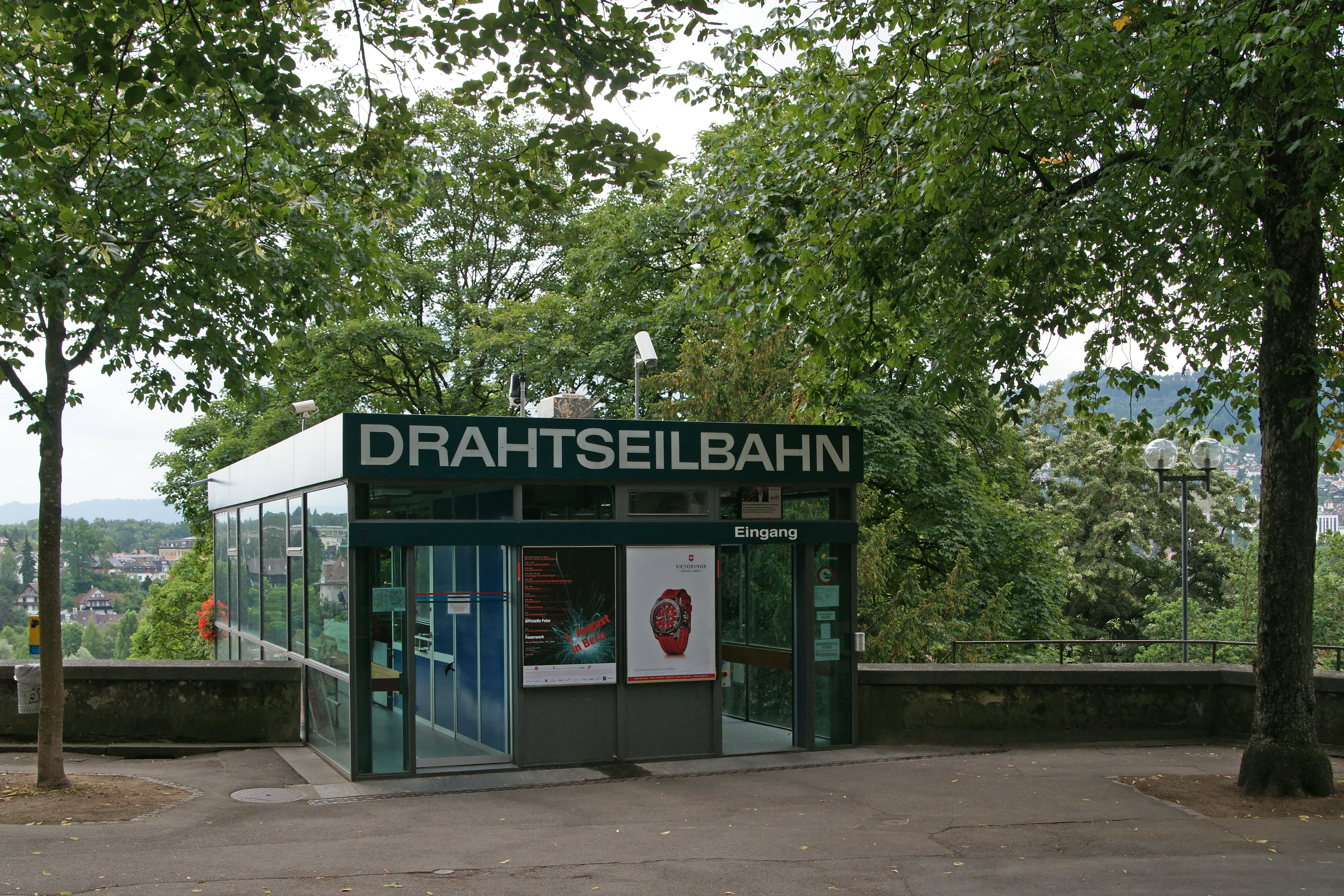
The upper station

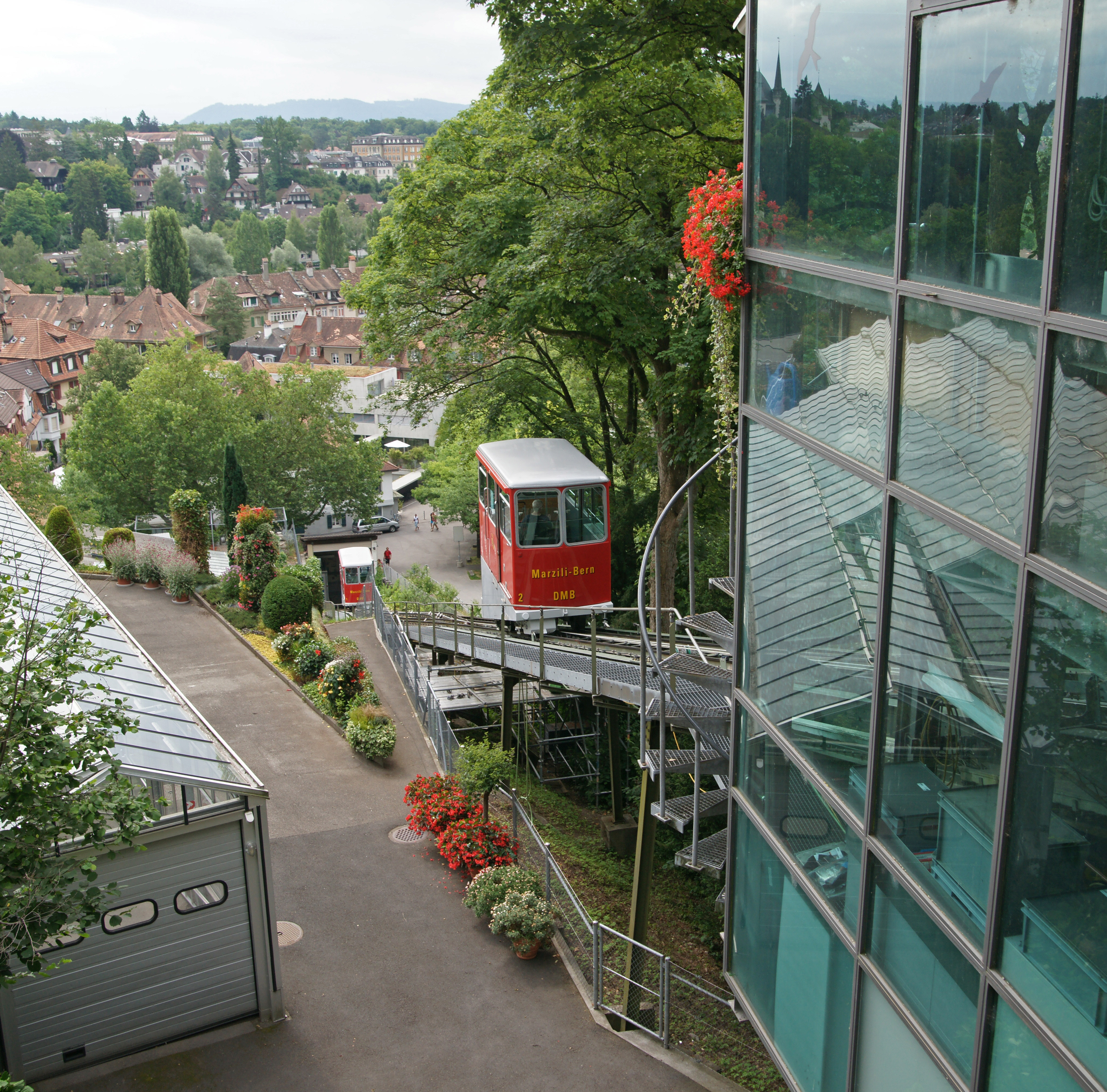
Looking down the length of the line

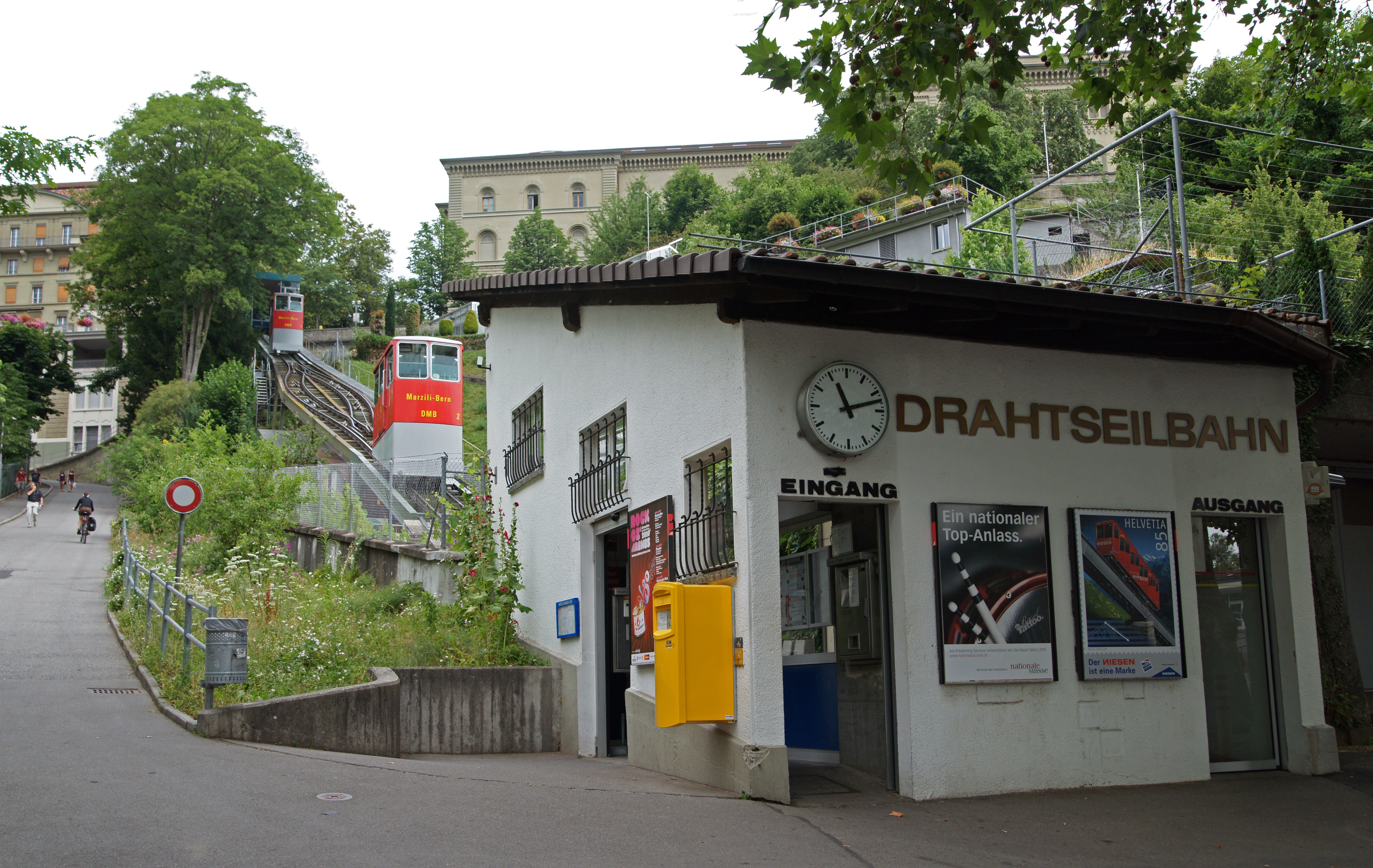
The lower station

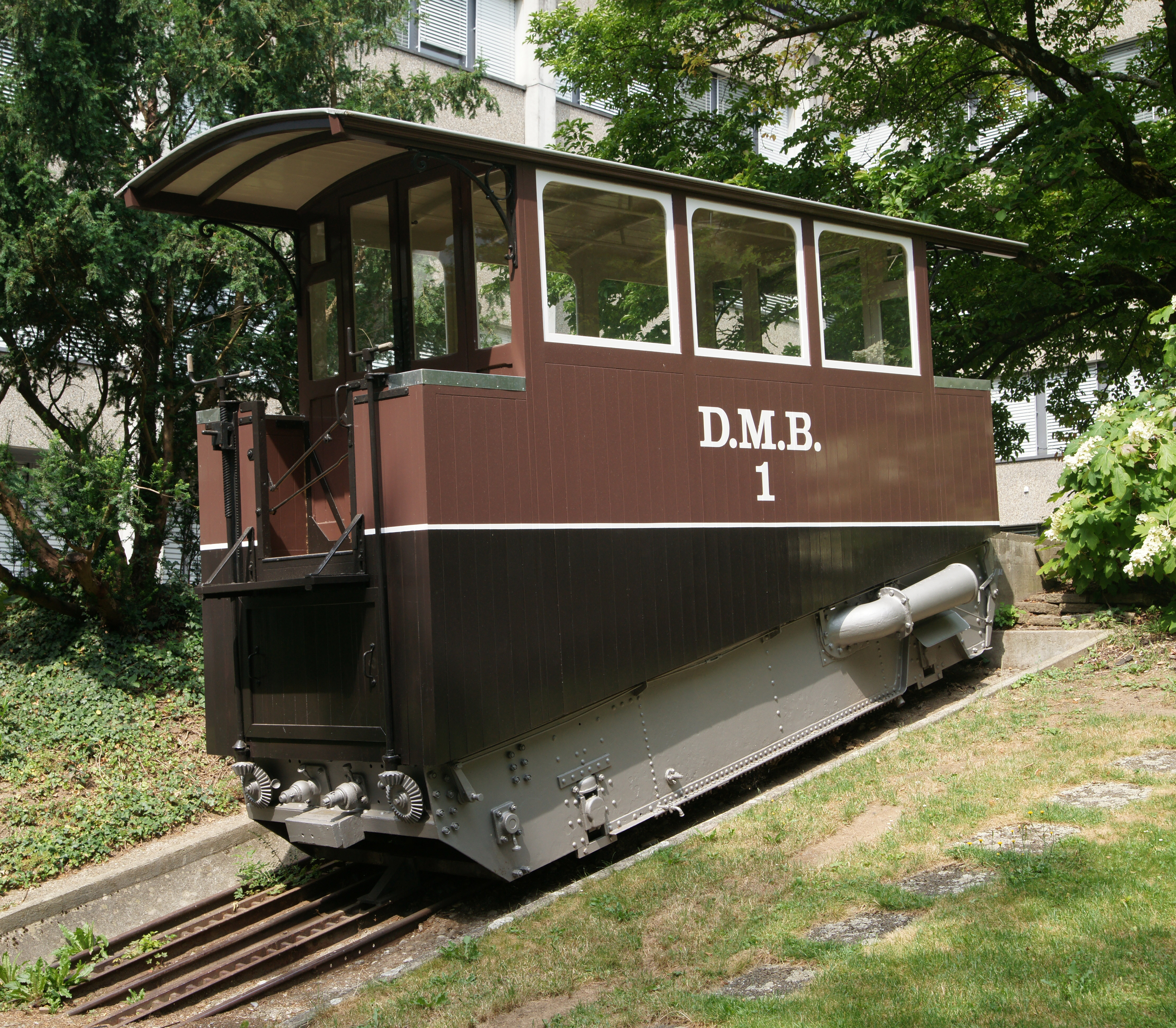
Previous generation of car preserved near lower terminal

== Technical parameters ==
The funicular has the following parameters:

Feature	Value
Number of cars	2
Number of stops	2 (at terminals)
Configuration	Single track with passing loop
Track length	105 metres (344 ft)
Rise	32 metres (105 ft)
Maximum gradient	32%
Track gauge	750 mm (2 ft 5 1/2 in)
Maximum speed	3 metres per second (9.8 ft/s)
Travel time	1 minute
Capacity	30 persons per car

== Records ==
The Marzilibahn is sometimes called the shortest funicular in Europe, but its operators are not certain about this, noting that similarly short funiculars exist in England and Hungary. The Zagreb Funicular in Croatia is at any rate shorter at 66 m (217 ft).

== Operator ==
The Marzilibahn is owned and operated by a private company, Drahtseilbahn Marzili-Stadt Bern AG, which employs ten part-time staff. Its shares are held mostly by railway enthusiasts. In 2009, the company turned a profit of 175,000 Swiss francs.

== See also ==
- List of funicular railways
- List of funiculars in Switzerland

== Bibliography ==
- Heimann, Alexander E. (1974). D Marzilibahn. Viktoria-Verlag.
