= List of heritage railways and funiculars in Switzerland =

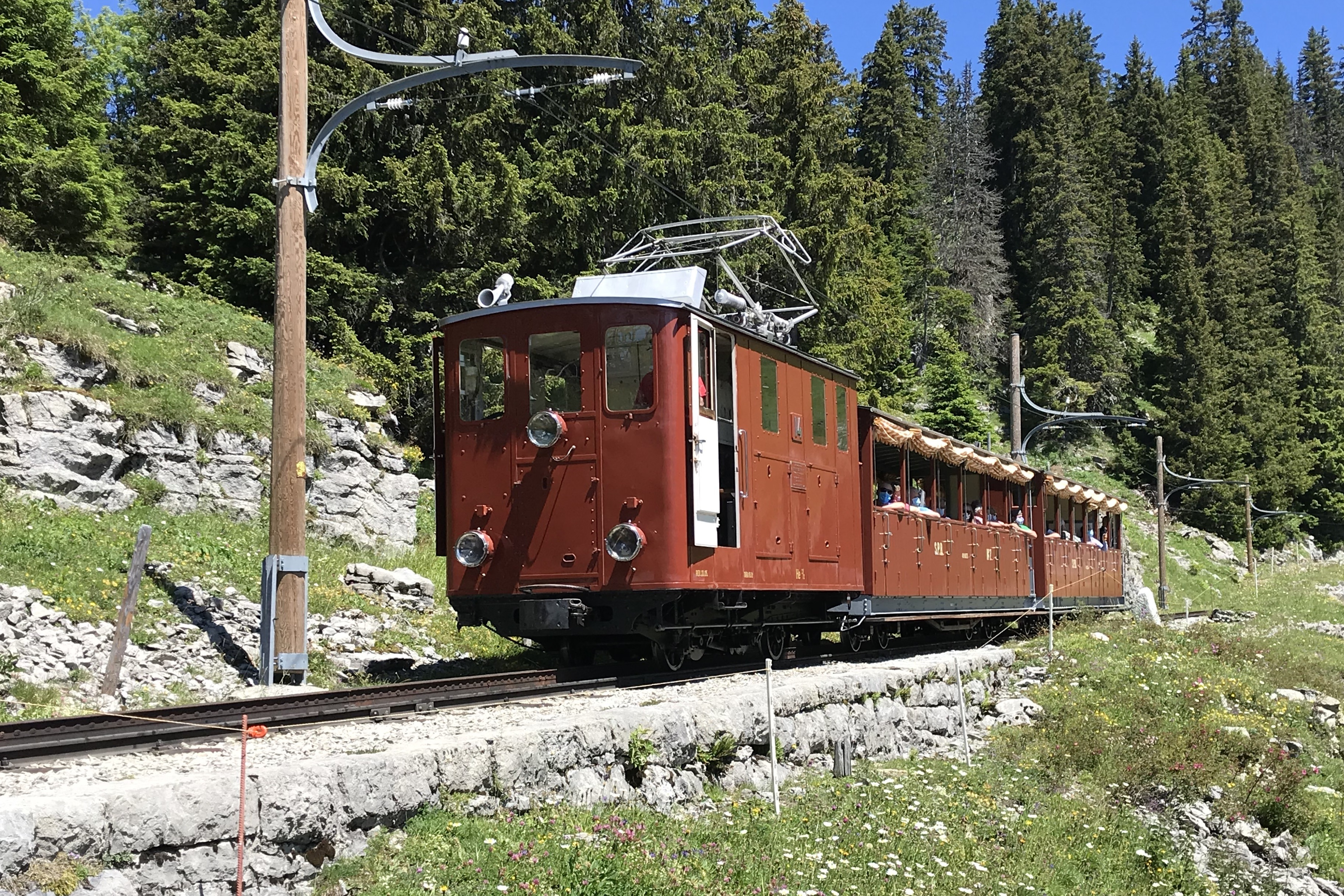
The Schynige Platte Railway

This is a list of heritage railways in Switzerland. For convenience, the list includes any pre-World War II railway in the large sense of the term (either adhesion railway, rack railway or funicular) currently operated with at least several original or historical carriages.

Switzerland has a very dense rail network, both standard and narrow gauge. The overwhelming majority of railways, built between the mid-19th and early 20th century, are still in regular operation today and were electrified earlier than in the rest of Europe. The major exception is the partially rack and pinion-operated Furka Steam Railway, the longest unelectrified line in the country. However, numerous rail operators, notably SBB Historic, provide services with well-maintained historical rolling stock.

== List ==
- Blonay–Chamby museum railway (adhesion)
- Brienz Rothorn Railway (rack)
- Dampfbahn-Verein Zürcher Oberland (adhesion)
- Etzwilen–Singen railway (adhesion)
- Funiculaire de Fribourg (funicular)
- Furka Steam Railway (rack and adhesion)
- Genossenschaft Museumsbahn Emmental (adhesion)
- Giessbachbahn (funicular)
- Heimwehfluhbahn (funicular)
- International Rhine Regulation Railway (adhesion)
- La Traction (adhesion)
- Les Avants–Sonloup (funicular)
- Montreux–Glion–Rochers-de-Naye railway (rack)
- Montreux–Lenk im Simmental line (adhesion)
- Mostindien-Express (adhesion)
- Pilatus Railway (rack)
- Reichenbachfall Funicular
- Rhaetian Railway, notably on the Albula and Bernina lines (adhesion)
- Riffelalp tram (adhesion)
- Rigi Railways (rack)
- Rorschach–Heiden railway (rack)
- SBB Historic (adhesion)
- Schinznacher Baumschulbahn (adhesion)
- Schynige Platte Railway (rack)
- Sonnenberg (funicular)
- Stanserhorn-Bahn (funicular)
- Vapeur Val-de-Travers (adhesion)
- Verein Historische Mittel-Thurgau-Bahn (adhesion)
- Zürcher Museums-Bahn (adhesion)

== See also ==
- List of railway museums in Switzerland
- List of narrow-gauge railways in Switzerland
- List of mountain railways in Switzerland
- List of funiculars in Switzerland
- Lists of tourist attractions in Switzerland
- Swiss Museum of Transport (Verkehrshaus Luzern)
