= Mini-Funiculaire d'Emosson =

Funicular in Valais, Switzerland

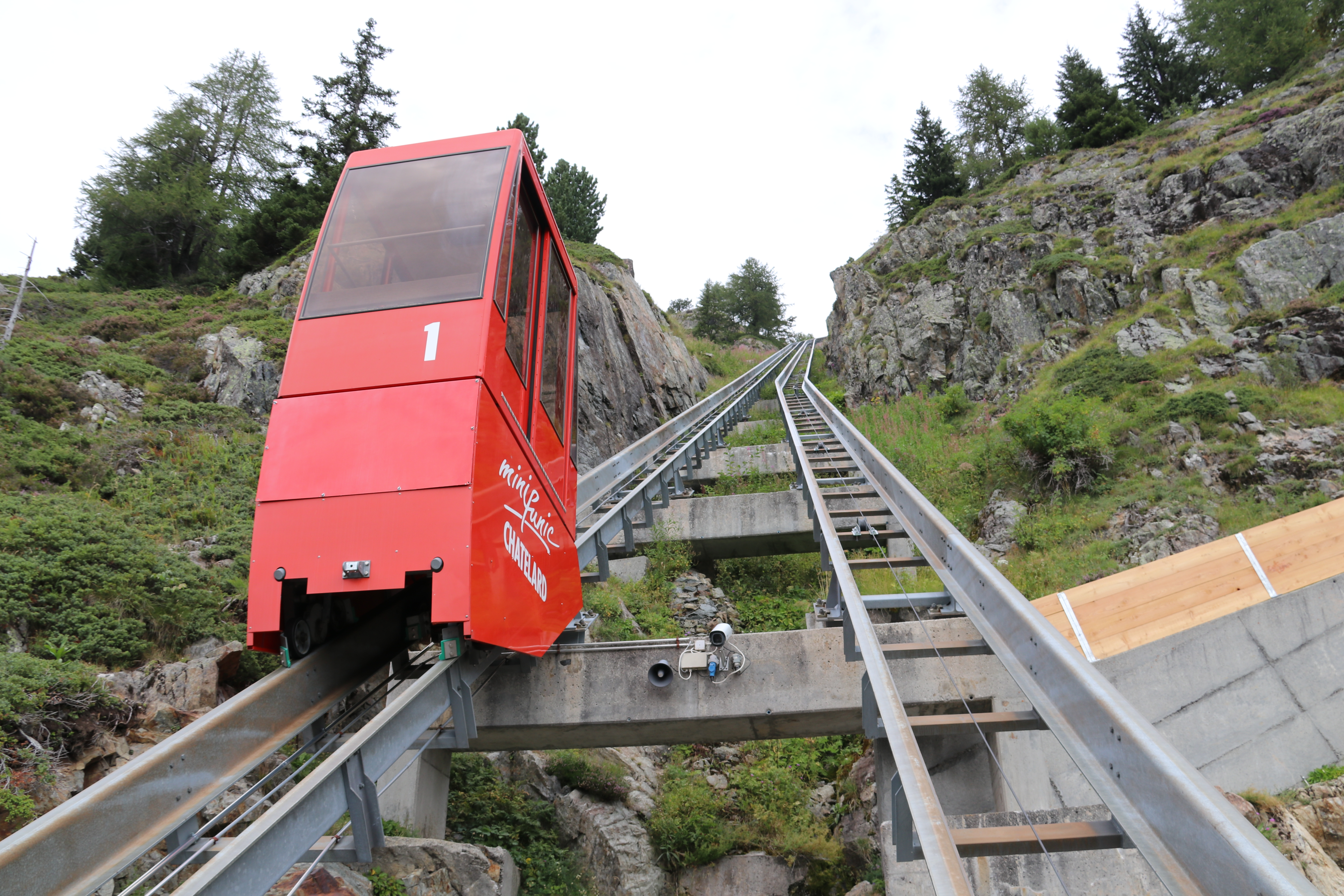
- Car and the two tracks near lower station (2019)

Overview
- Status: In operation
- Owner: Commune de Finhault (2023-), Parc d'attractions du Châtelard VS S.A. (2003-2022); Société anonyme des transports Emosson-Barberine (1991-1997, name change), Trains Touristiques d'Emosson SA (1997-2003, name change)
- Locale: Valais, Switzerland
- Termini: "Pied du barrage"; "Lac d'Emosson"
- Stations: 2
- Website: verticalp-emosson.ch

Service
- Type: Funicular
- Rolling stock: 2 for 8 passengers each
- Ridership: 200 persons/h

History
- Opened: 1991

Technical
- Line length: 260 m (850 ft)
- Number of tracks: 2
- Track gauge: 900 mm (2 ft 11 7/16 in)
- Electrification: from opening
- Operating speed: 2.5 metres per second (8.2 ft/s)
- Highest elevation: 1,965 m (6,447 ft)

Mini-Funiculaire d'Emosson is a funicular railway at the Emosson dam in the canton of Valais, Switzerland. It leads from Pied du Barrage (literally "foot of the dam") at 1812 m to its top at 1952 m on Lake Emosson. The two-track line has a length of 260 m at a maximum incline of 73% for a difference of elevation of 140 m.

It was opened in 1991 and replaced a monorail rack railway. The lower station is accessed by a steam train, the Petit train panoramique d'Émosson, connecting with the Funiculaire du Châtelard.

In 2023, the former owner "Parc d'Attractions du Châtelard VS S.A." entered liquidation. It was previously named "Trains Touristiques d'Emosson SA" and "Société anonyme des transports Emosson-Barberine".

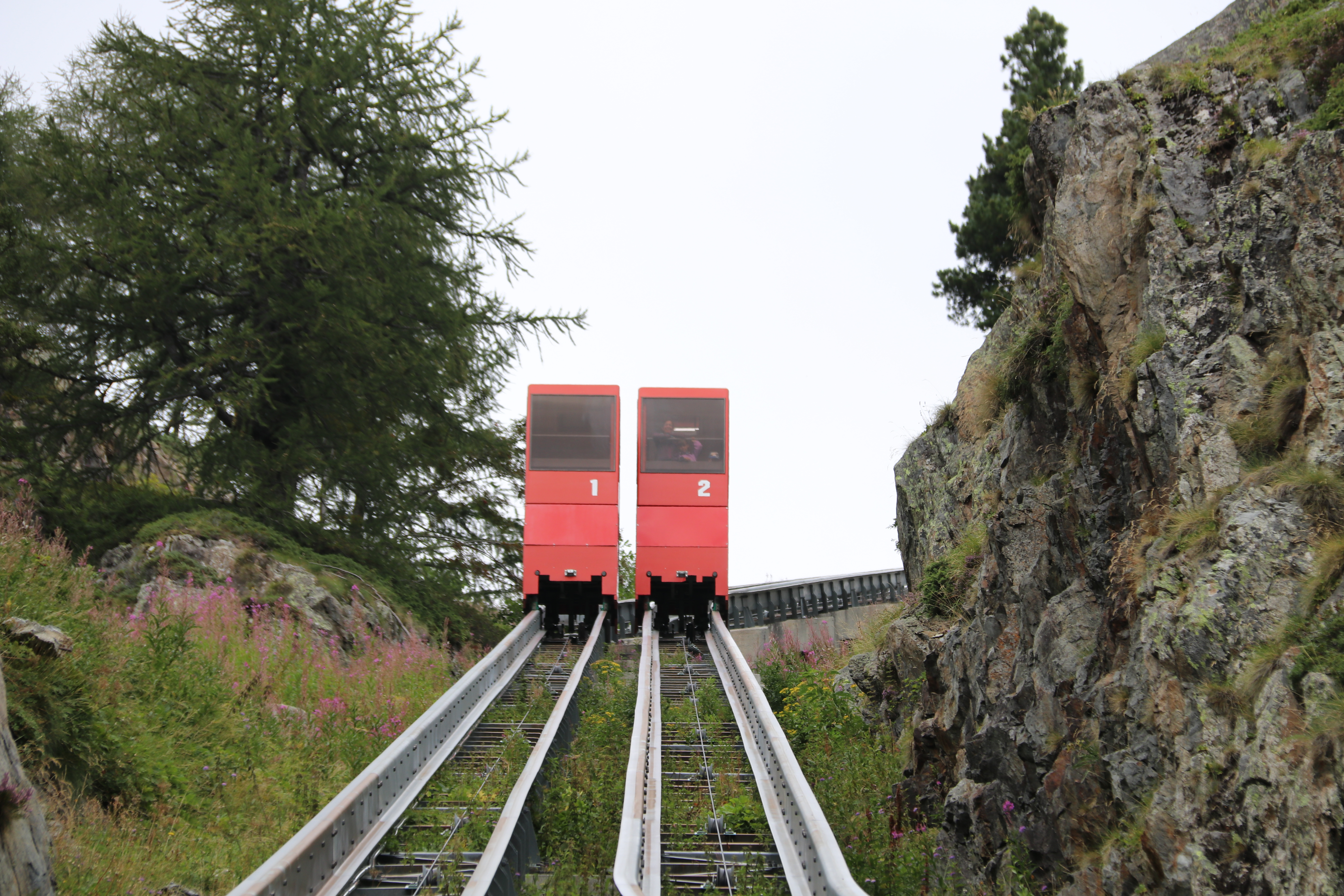
The two cars next to each other (2019)

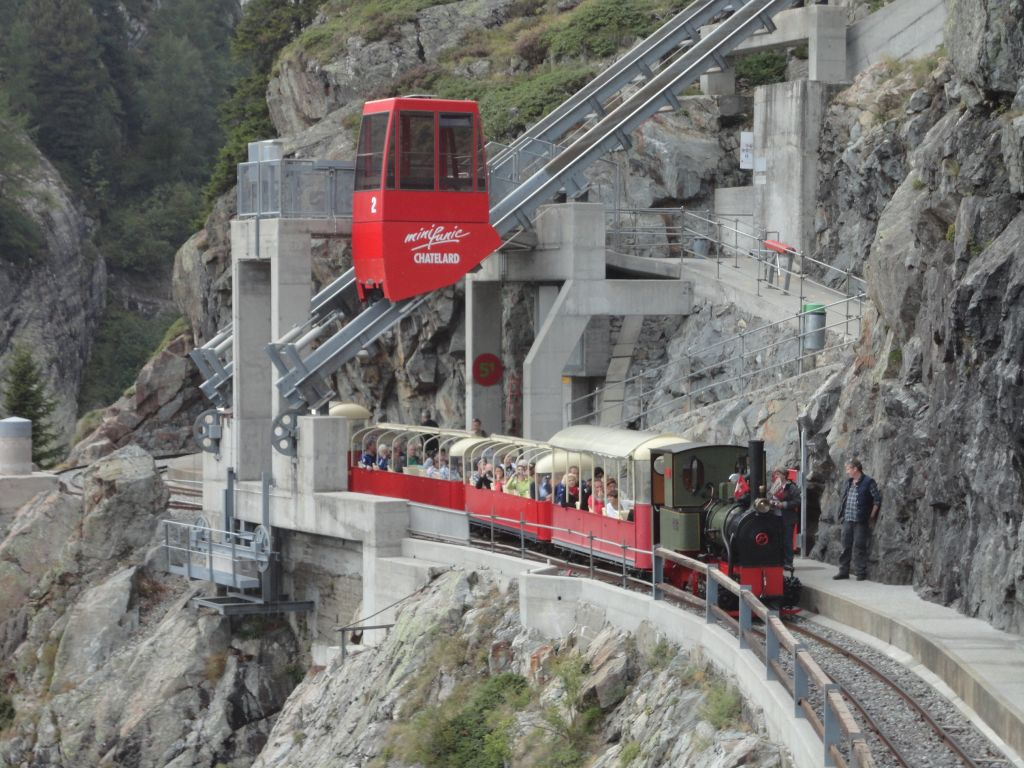
Lower station (2012)

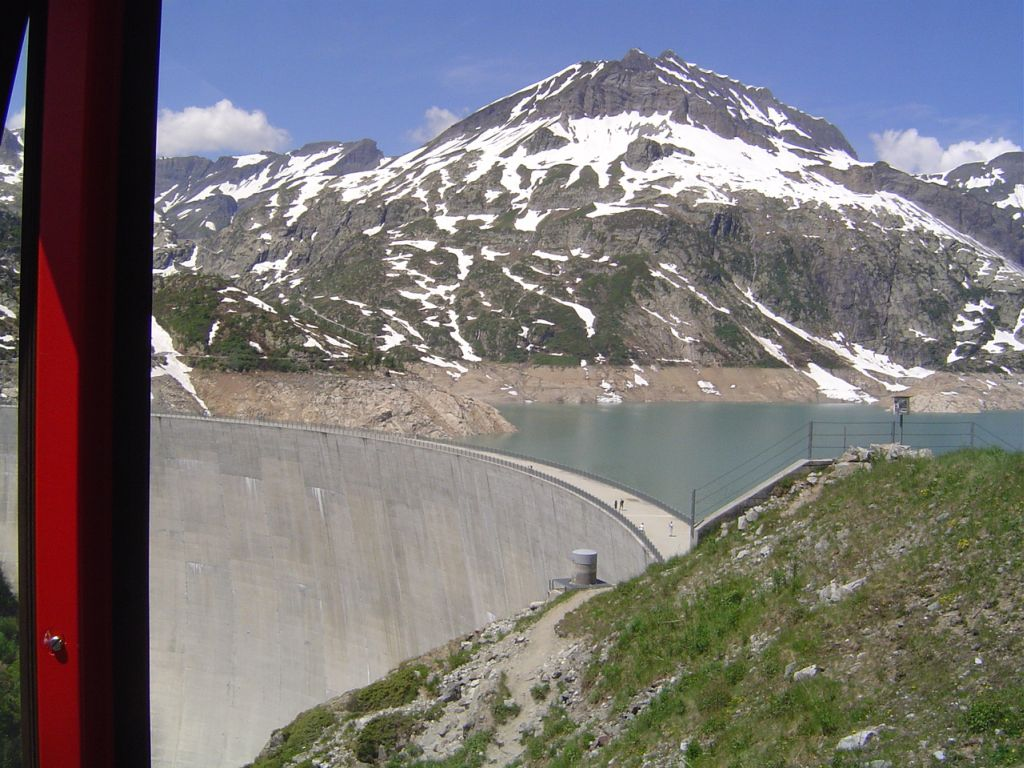
Emosson lake and dam as seen from the funicular (2008)
