= Sonnenberg Funicular =

Funicular railway in the canton of Lucerne, Switzerland

Sonnenbergbahn
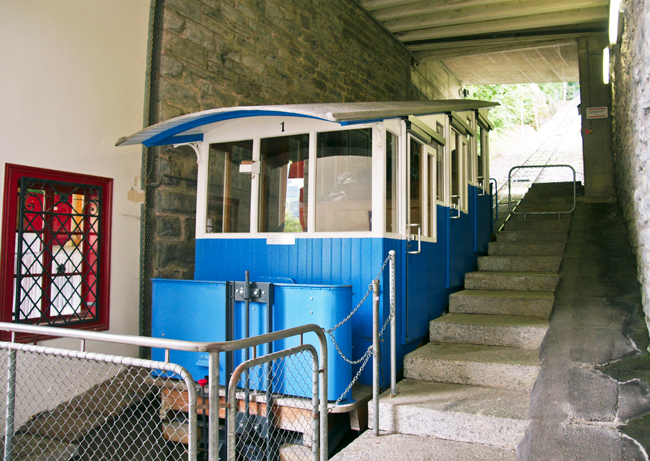
- lower station (2010)

Overview
- Other name(s): Standseilbahn Kriens–Sonnenberg; Sonnenbergbahn Kriens
- Status: in operation
- Owner: A.G. Sonnenbergbahn Kriens
- Locale: Canton of Lucerne, Switzerland
- Coordinates: 47.0407°N 8.2752°E
- Termini: "Kriens (Sonnenbergbahn)" at Waldheimstrasse 11 (47°02′14″N 8°16′37″E); "Sonnenberg (Kriens)" (47°02′38″N 8°16′21″E)
- Stations: 3 (including "Zumhof")

Service
- Type: funicular
- Route number: 2515
- Rolling stock: 2 for 30 passengers each

History
- Opened: 5 May 1902 (123 years ago)
- Hotel closed: 1955

Technical
- Track length: 839 metres (2,753 ft)
- Number of tracks: 1 with passing loop
- Track gauge: 1,000 mm (3 ft 3 3/8 in)
- Electrification: from opening
- Operating speed: 1.6 metres per second (5.2 ft/s)
- Highest elevation: 704 m (2,310 ft)
- Maximum incline: 42.5%

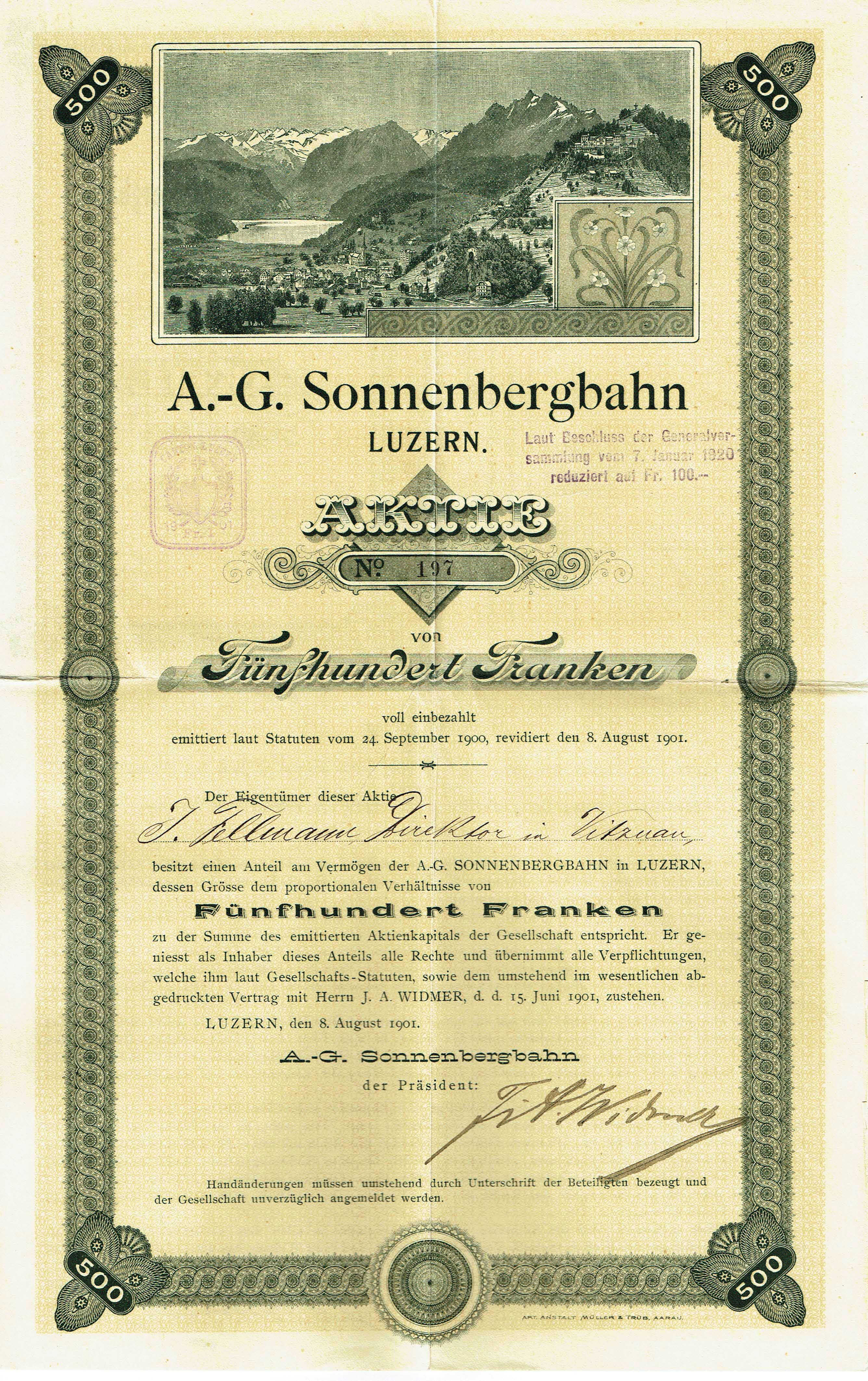
Share of the AG Sonnenbergbahn, issued 8. August 1901

The Sonnenberg Funicular, also known as the Standseilbahn Kriens–Sonnenberg (KSB) or Sonnenbergbahn, is a funicular railway near the city of Lucerne in the Swiss canton of Lucerne. It links the town of Kriens with the Sonnenberg at 704 m, a hiking and recreational area, and serves an intermediate stop at Zumhof.

The line was opened in 1902. In recent years it has been restored electrically and mechanically.

The funicular has the following parameters:

Feature	Value
Number of stops	3
Configuration	Single track with passing loop
Track length	839 metres (2,753 ft)
Rise	210 metres (690 ft)
Maximum gradient	42.5%
Track gauge	1,000 mm (3 ft 3 3/8 in) metre gauge
Number of cars	2
Capacity	30 passengers per car
Maximum speed	1.6 metres per second (5.2 ft/s)
Travel time	8 minutes

== See also ==
- List of heritage railways and funiculars in Switzerland
