= Harderkulm =

Mountain in Switzerland

- Harder Kulm (top funicular station)
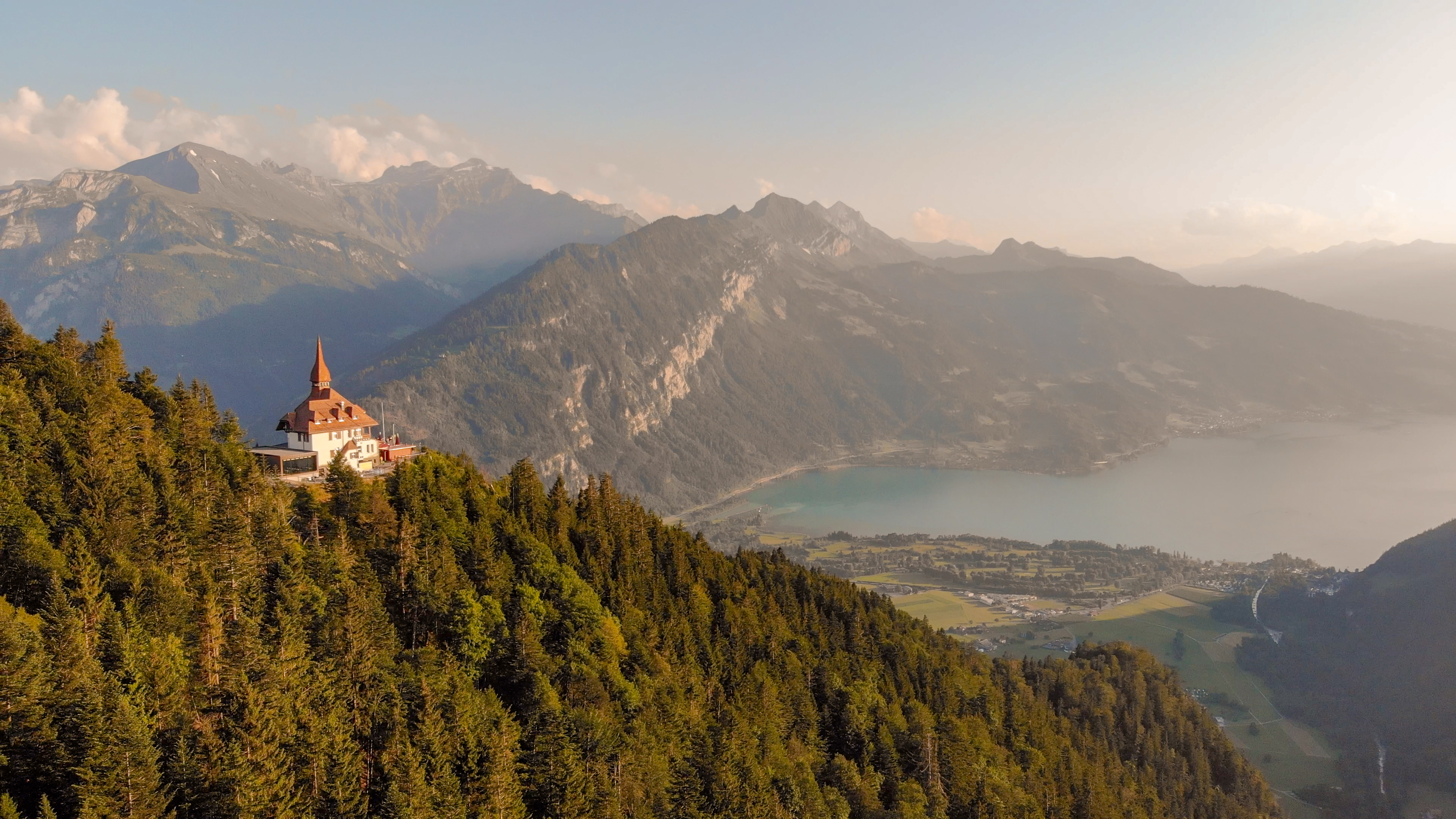
- Harder Kulm and Lake Thun at sunset

Highest point
- Elevation: 1,321 m (4,334 ft)
- Coordinates: 46°42′N 7°51′E

Geography
- Location within Switzerland
- Country: Switzerland
- Canton: Bern
- Parent range: Emmental Alps
- Topo map: Swiss Federal Office for Topography – swisstopo

Geology
- Mountain type: Viewpoint

The Harderkulm (also referred to as Harder Kulm, since the top station of the funicular is called that way) is a funicular station at 1,322 metres (4,337 ft) in the Berner Oberland region of Switzerland, overlooking the towns of Interlaken and Unterseen. It is located at the western end of the Harder, which in itself is the most western, forested ridge of the about 30 kilometres (19 mi) long, prominent mountain range dominating the north shore of the Lake of Brienz.

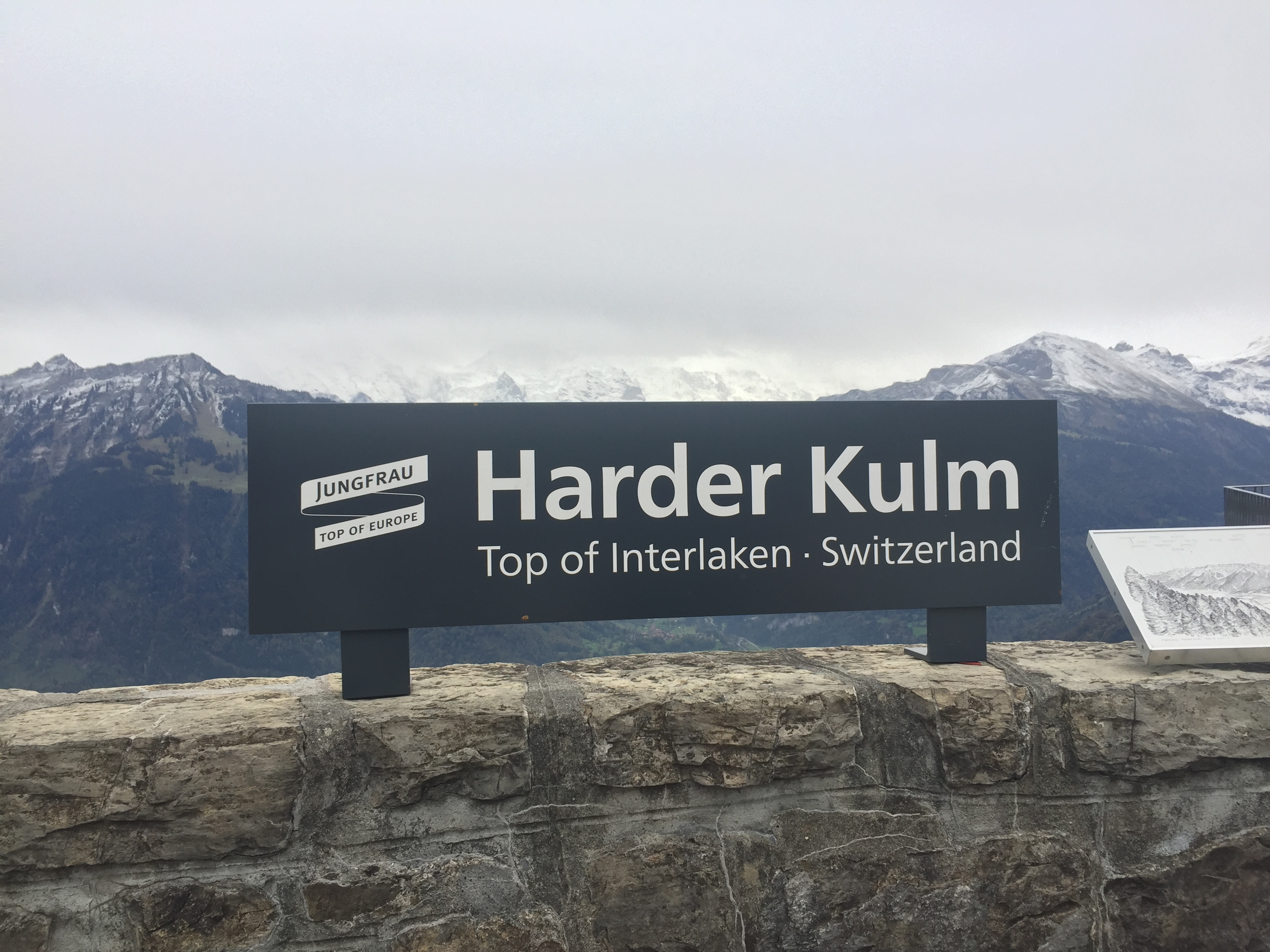
Harder Kulm

The viewpoint belongs to the municipality of Unterseen in the canton of Bern with the slopes shared between the municipalities of Unterseen and Interlaken. The viewpoint offers extensive views across Interlaken, the alluvial land called Bödeli, and southwards up the valley of the river Lütschine to the high peaks of the Bernese Alps, whilst itself forming part of the Emmental Alps.

Harderkulm is occupied by the castle-like Bergrestaurant Harder Kulm and adjoining observation platform.

== Funicular ==
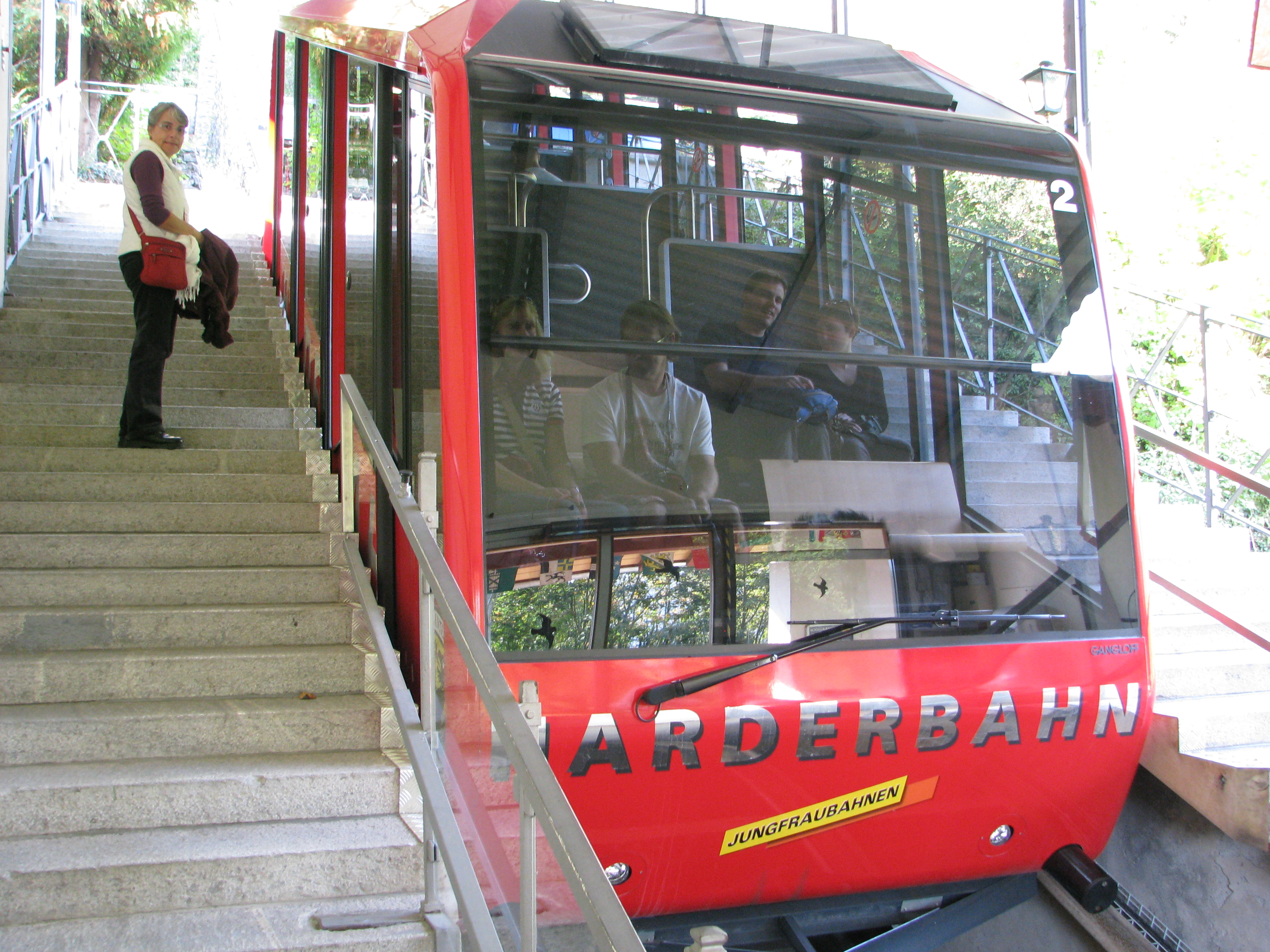
The Harder funicular

The Harderbahn, a tourist funicular, links Interlaken with an upper station some five minutes walk from the restaurant. The funicular journey takes eight minutes.
