= Funiculaire du Châtelard =

Funicular railway at Emosson dam in Valais, Switzerland

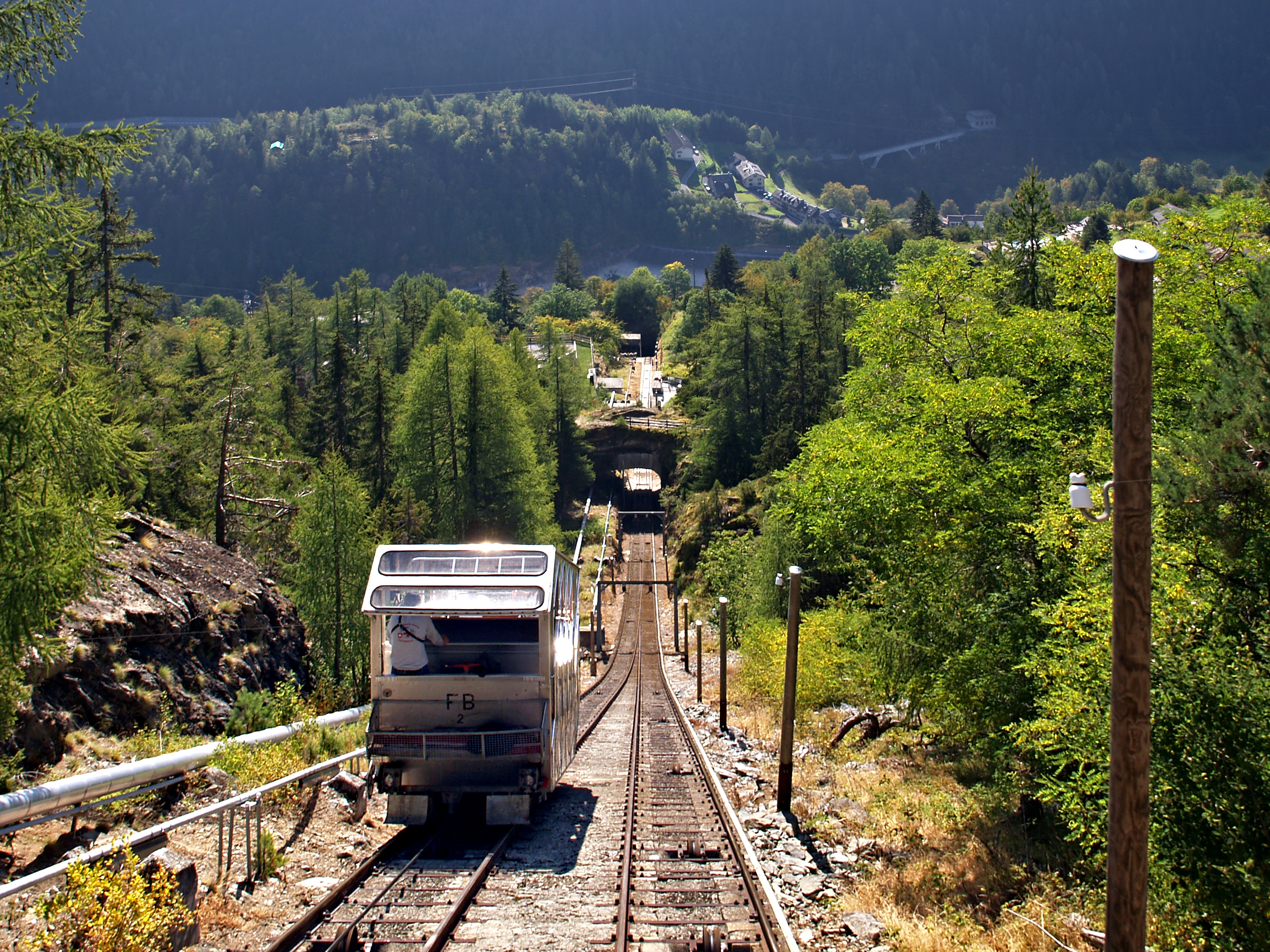
- Funicular at passing loop (2007)

Overview
- Other name(s): Drahtseilbahn Châtelard-Village—Giétroz—Château d'Eau; Drahtseilbahn Le Châtelard-Giétroz-Château d'eau/Emosson
- Status: Operating
- Owner: Parc d'attractions du Châtelard VS S.A. (since 2003); SBB-CFF (1921-1975) Trains Touristiques d'Emosson SA (1997-2003, name change); Société anonyme des transports Emosson-Barberine (1975-1997, name change)
- Locale: Valais, Switzerland
- Termini: "Le Châtelard VS Funiculaire"; "Les Montuires"
- Stations: 3 (including "Giétroz")
- Website: verticalp-emosson.ch

Service
- Type: Funicular
- Rolling stock: 2 for 60 passengers each; 2 for 7000 kg (in 1923)

History
- Opened: 1921
- Open to public: 1934
- Closed by SBB: 1968
- Reopened under Trains Touristiques d'Emosson SA: 1975

Technical
- Track length: 1,302 m (4,272 ft)
- Number of tracks: 1 with passing loop
- Track gauge: 1,000 mm (3 ft 3 3/8 in)
- Electrification: from opening
- Highest elevation: 1,821 m (5,974 ft)
- Maximum incline: 87%

Funiculaire du Châtelard is a funicular railway at Emosson dam in the canton of Valais, Switzerland. It leads from Le Châtelard 1129 m to Château d'Eau at 1821 m. It is part of Parc d'Attractions Verticalp, temporarily closed in 2022 The line has a length of 1302 m at a maximum incline of 87% and a difference of elevation of 693 m. The single-track line has two cars and a passing loop.

== History ==
The funicular was built in 1921 for the Swiss Federal Railways by Von Roll at the construction of the Barberine dam and opened to the public in 1935. It was also used for the construction of the Emosson dam (completed 1972).

As of 2023, the line is owned by "Parc d'Attractions du Châtelard VS S.A.", previously named "Trains Touristiques d'Emosson SA" and "Société anonyme des transports Emosson-Barberine".

In 1968, SBB-CFF-FFS closed the funicular. In 1974, it was acquired by the newly formed Trains Touristiques d'Emosson SA, which reopened it in 1975. In 2014, the company, by then renamed Parc d’Attractions du Châtelard, was taken over by the municipality of Finhaut, which renovated the funicular in 2015.

The company entered restructuring in July 2022. By March 2023, its website announced that another company may resume its operations. On 24 May, it was announced that the new company VerticAlp SA, a fully-owned subsidiary of the municipality of Finhaut, would reopen the Emosson rail network in June. As of July 2023, it is again operating.
