= Lac d'Émosson =

Lake of hydroelectric dam in Switzerland

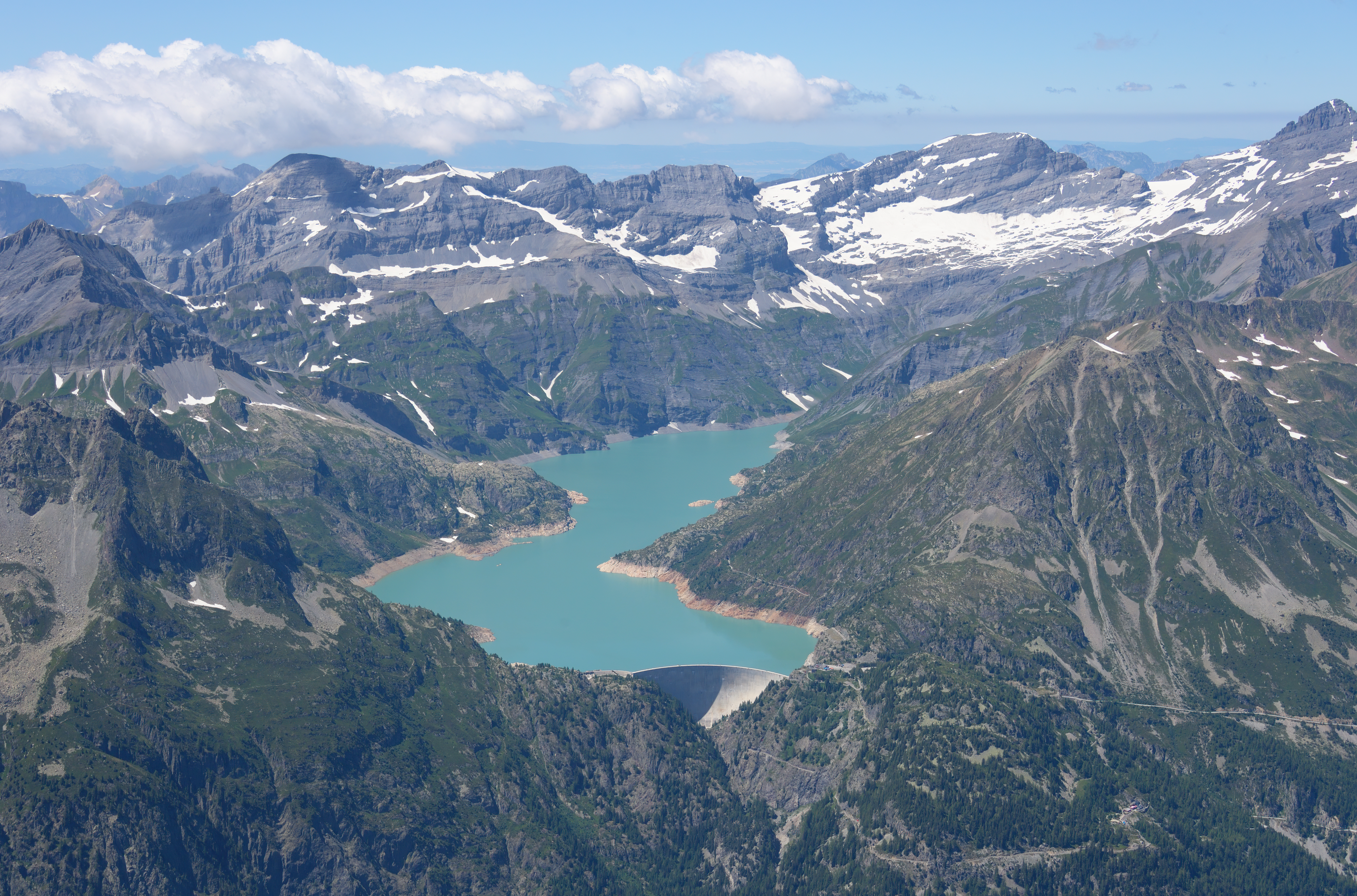

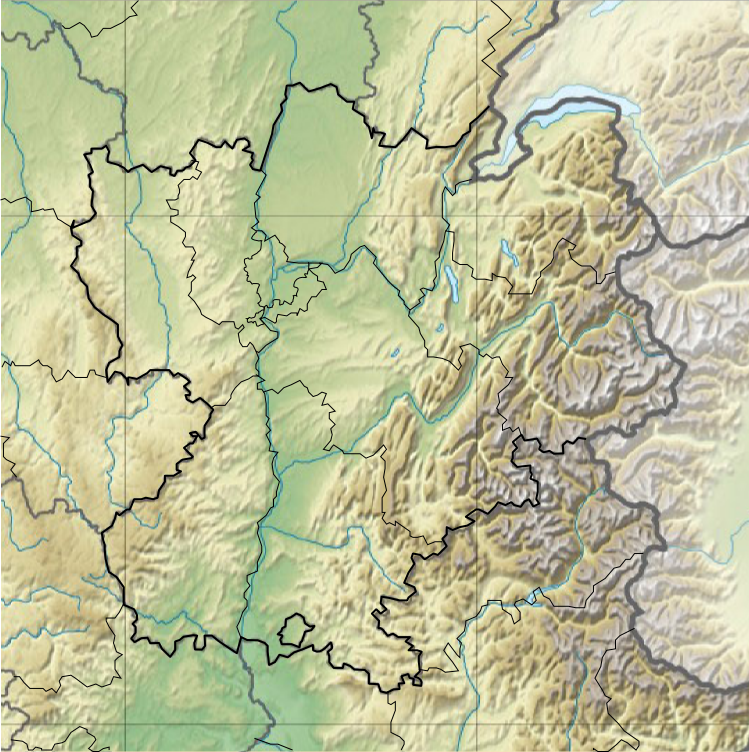
- Location within Canton of Valais Location within Rhône-Alpes Location within Switzerland Location within France Location within Alps
- Interactive map of Lac d'Émosson
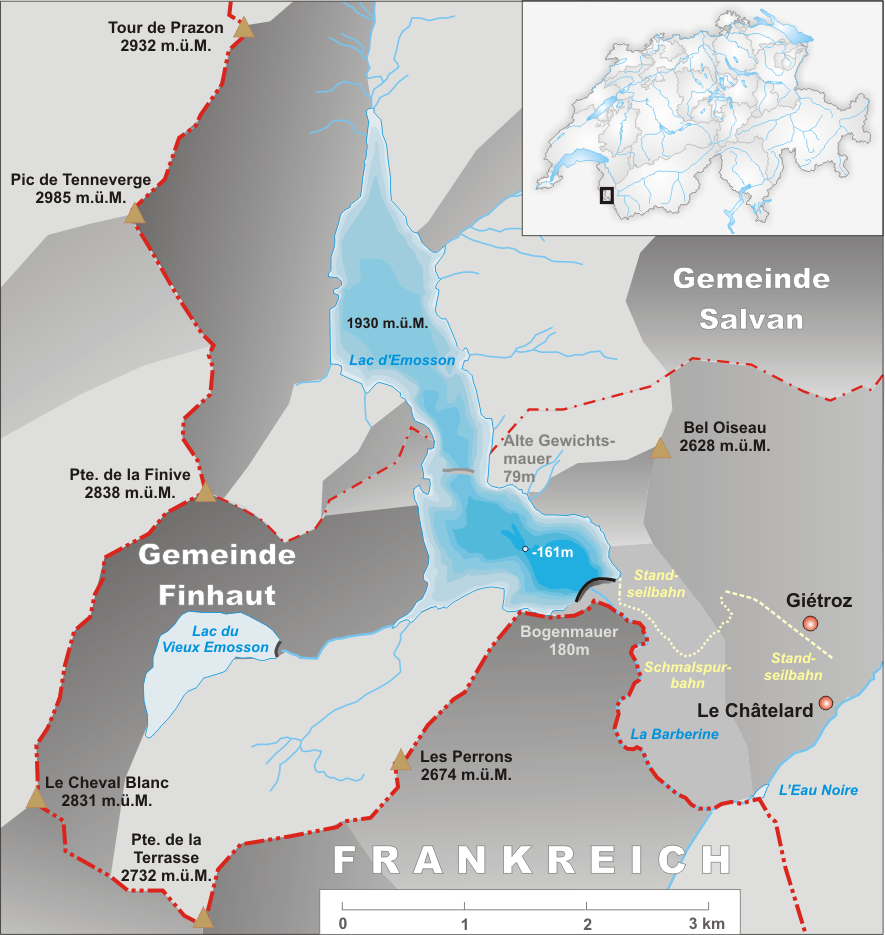
- Map
- Location: Valais
- Coordinates: 46°4′18″N 6°55′10″E
- Type: reservoir
- Primary outflows: Barberine
- Catchment area: 34.91 km^{2} (13.48 sq mi)
- Basin countries: Switzerland, France
- Surface area: 3.27 km^{2} (1.26 sq mi)
- Max. depth: 161 m (528 ft)
- Water volume: 227 million cubic metres (184,000 acre⋅ft)
- Surface elevation: 1,930 m (6,330 ft)

The Lac d'Émosson (French pronunciation: [lak demɔsɔ̃], "Lake Émosson") is a reservoir in the canton of Valais, Switzerland. It is located in the municipalities of Salvan and Finhaut. The closest small city in Switzerland is Martigny. The lake has a surface area of 3.27 km^{2} and an elevation of 1,930 m. The maximum depth is 180 meters. The purpose of the Émosson Dam is hydroelectric power generation. Water from the reservoir first powers the 189 MW Vallorcine Power Station downstream and just over the border in Vallorcine, France. Water is then sent through a headrace tunnel to the 190 MW La Bâtiaz Power Station, 12 km (7 mi) to the east in Martigny, Switzerland. The drop between the dam and La Bâtiaz Power Station is 1,400 m (4,593 ft).

The first dam of Émosson (also known as Barberine Dam) was built in 1925. The current dam with a height of 180 m was constructed between 1969 and August 1973 and floods the old dam. The reservoir was fully impounded on 10 September 1975, it increased the reservoir's volume from 40 million m³ to 227 million m³. The old dam can still be seen when the water level in the Lac d'Émosson is very low.

The lake serves as the lower reservoir for the 900 MW Nant de Drance Hydropower Plant which began operations in 2022.

In 1955, another dam was built 300m higher above the now existing lake. This lake is now known as the Lac du Vieux Émosson.

The dam can be reached by road or by a funicular-train-funicular trip. The Funiculaire du Châtelard is the first used from the valley bottom, it is the steepest 2-cabin funicular railway in the world with a gradient of 87 percent. Mini-Funiculaire d'Emosson runs next to the dam with a maximum incline of 73% for a difference of elevation of 140 m. At the top of this funicular there is access to a 450m zipline across the dam's face.

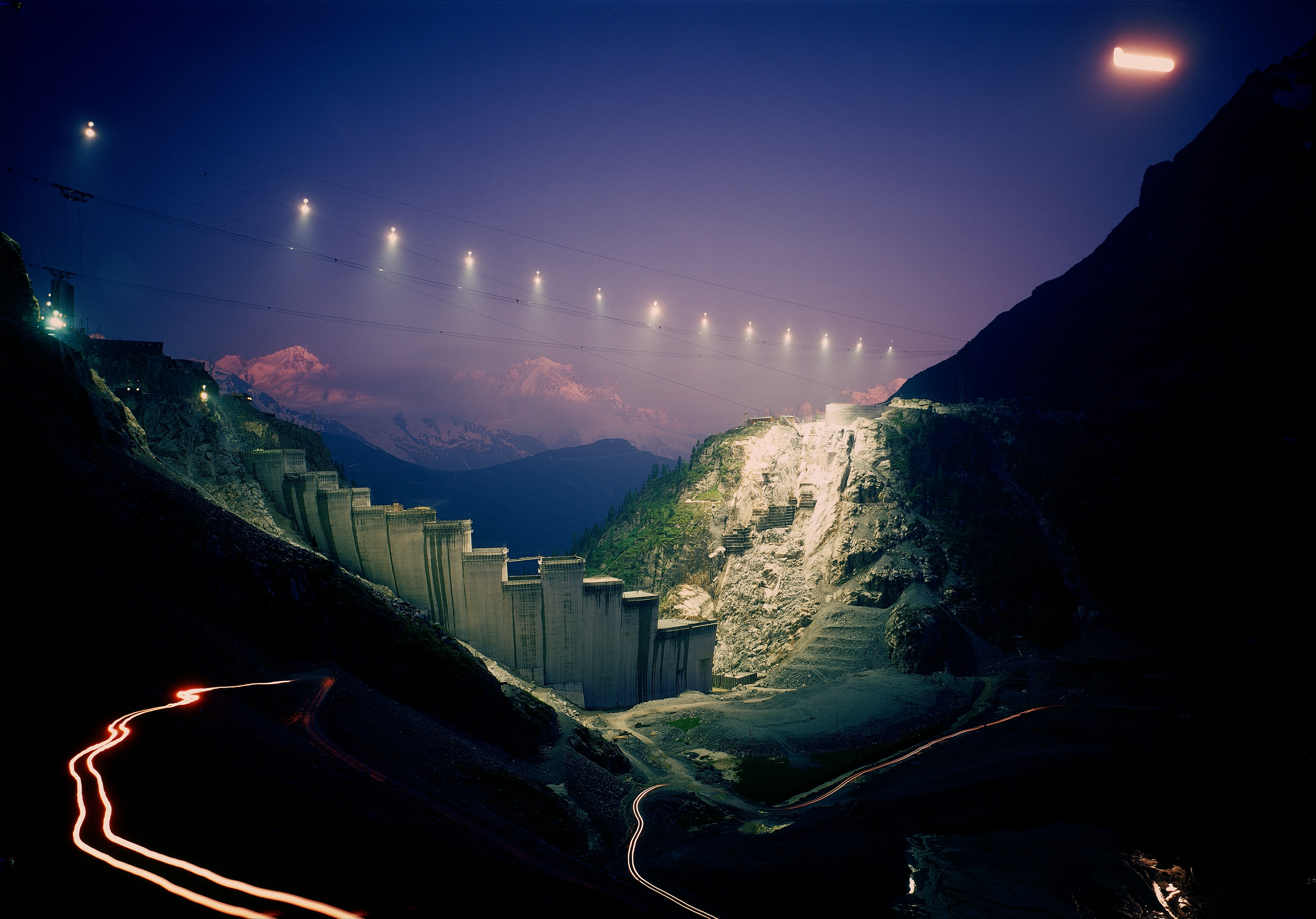
Construction of the new Émosson dam, 1971

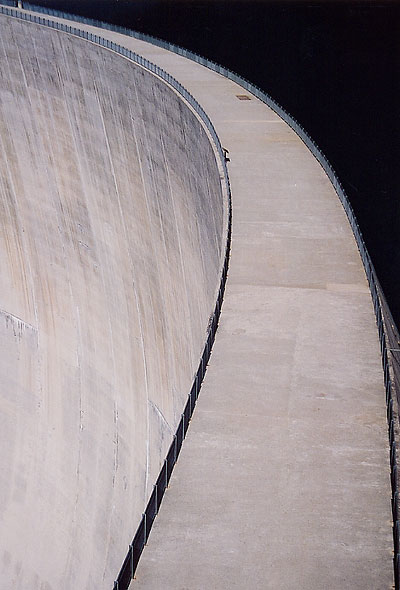
Detail of the arch dam

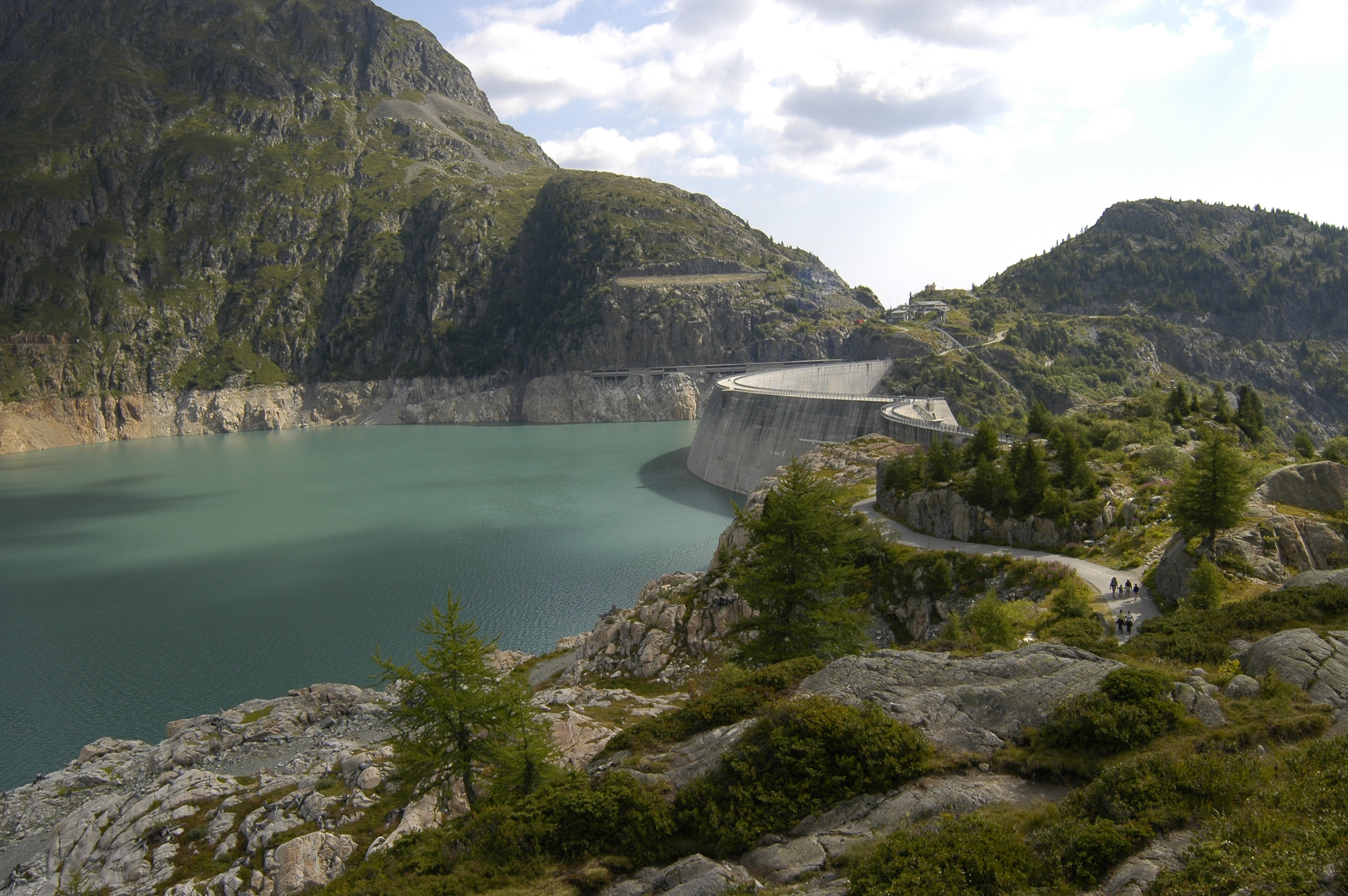
Lac d’Émosson, viewed from Col du Passet

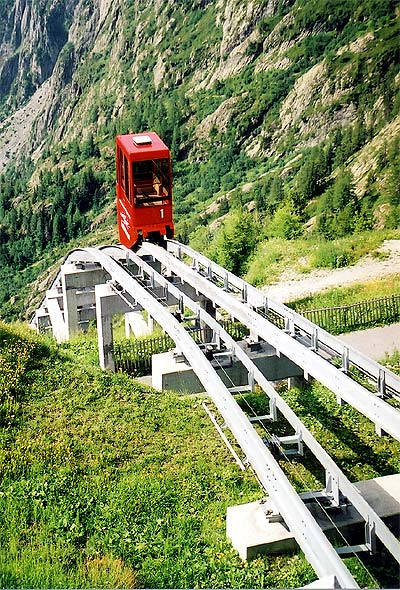
Mini-Funiculaire d'Emosson (2004)

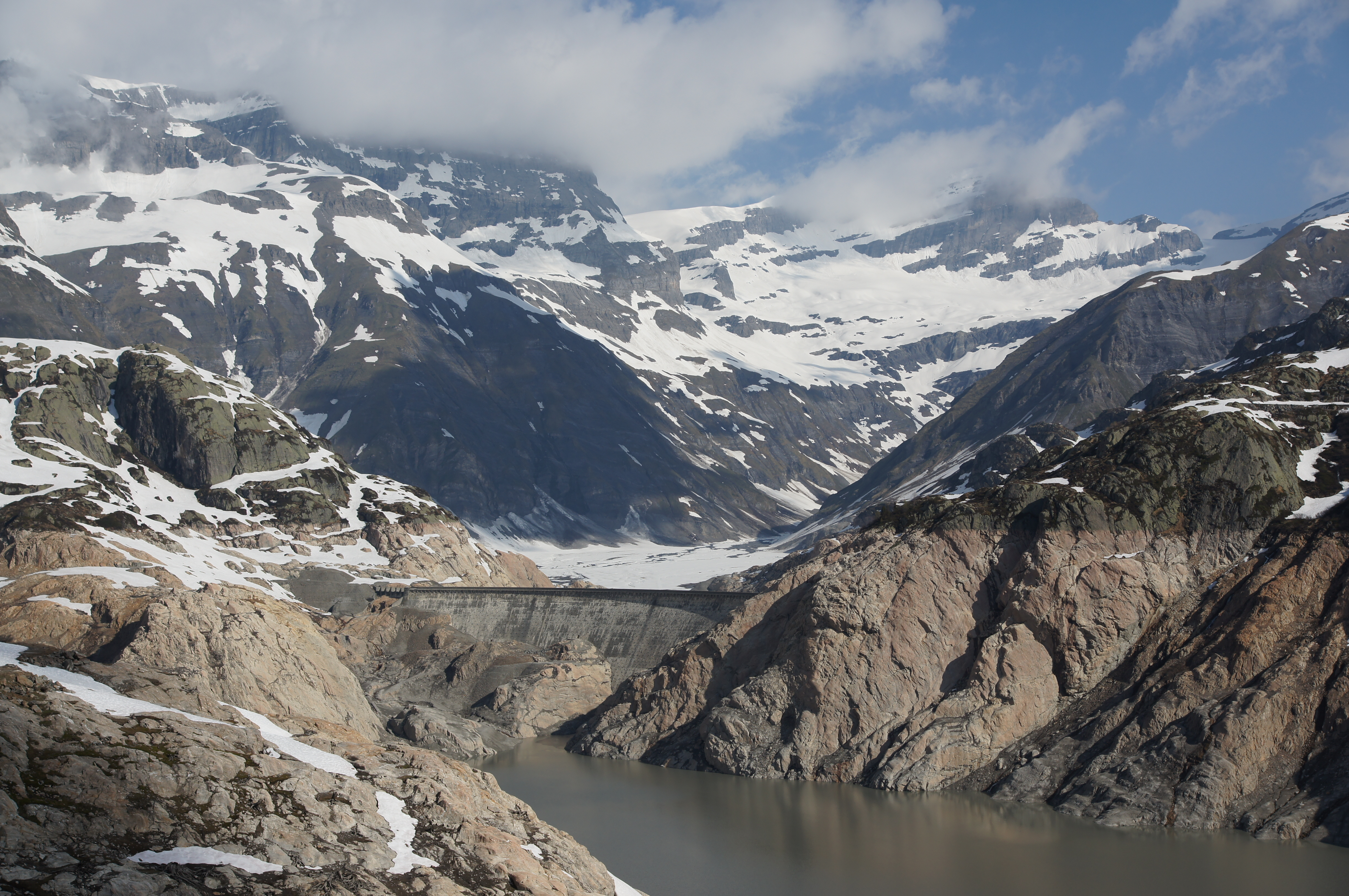
The old gravity dam is visible when the water level is low

== See also ==
- List of lakes of Switzerland
- List of mountain lakes of Switzerland
- Renewable energy in Switzerland
