= Obergoms =

- Municipality
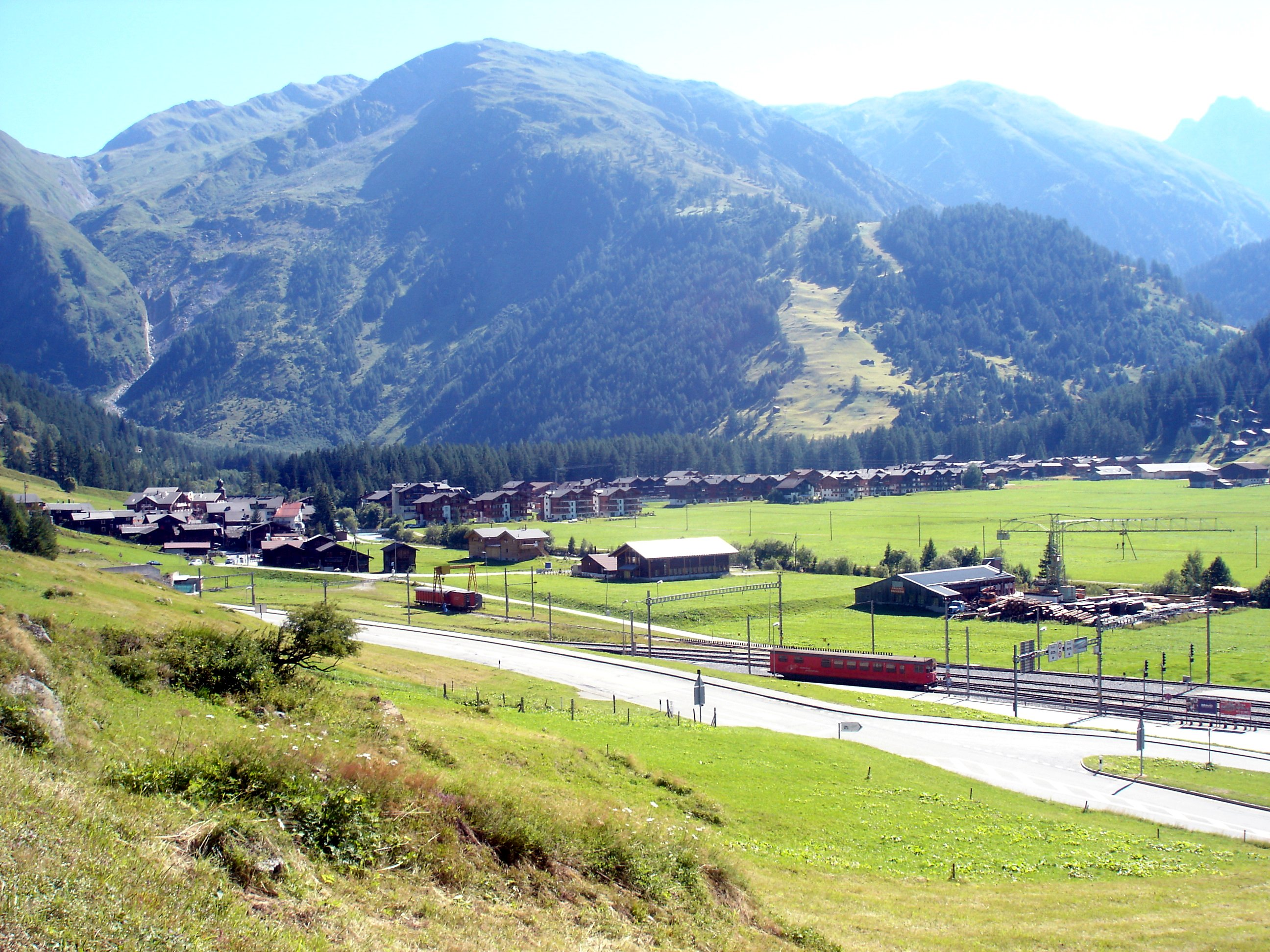

- Flag Coat of arms
- Location of Obergoms
- Location within Switzerland Location within Canton of Valais
- Coordinates: 46°32′N 8°21′E
- Country: Switzerland
- Canton: Valais
- District: Goms

Government
  - Mayor: Christian Imsand

Area
  - Total: 155.80 km^{2} (60.15 sq mi)
- Elevation: 1,377 m (4,518 ft)

Population (December 2007)
  - Total: 705
  - Density: 4.53/km^{2} (11.7/sq mi)
- Time zone: UTC+01:00 (CET)
  - Summer (DST): UTC+02:00 (CEST)
- Postal code: 3999
- SFOS number: 6076
- ISO 3166 code: CH-VS
- Localities: Oberwald, Ulrichen, Obergesteln, Gletsch
- Website: https://gemeinde.obergoms.ch SFSO statistics

Obergoms is the upper part of the Goms and a municipality in the district of Goms in the canton of Valais in Switzerland. It was formed on 1 January 2009 when the three municipalities Ulrichen, Obergesteln and Oberwald merged.

== History ==
Obergesteln is first mentioned in 1322 as castellione. In 1415 it was mentioned as obergestillen. Oberwald is first mentioned in 1386 as Superiore Valde. In 1419 it was mentioned as Oberwaldt. Ulrichen is first mentioned in 1235 as Vlrighingen. In 1240 it was mentioned as holriquinguen.

The area around Ulrichen was the site of two battles during the Middle Ages. The First Battle of Ulrichen in 1211 was a decisive defeat of Bernese troops under Duke Berthold V of Zähringen by the army of the Canton of Valais under the Bishop of Sion Landrich von Mont. Many details about the battle are uncertain or questioned by historians. The Second Battle of Ulrichen in 1419 was between the Old Swiss Confederacy led by Bern and Valais. The second battle was a Valais victory and negotiations after the battle led to the end of the Raron affair.

== Geography ==
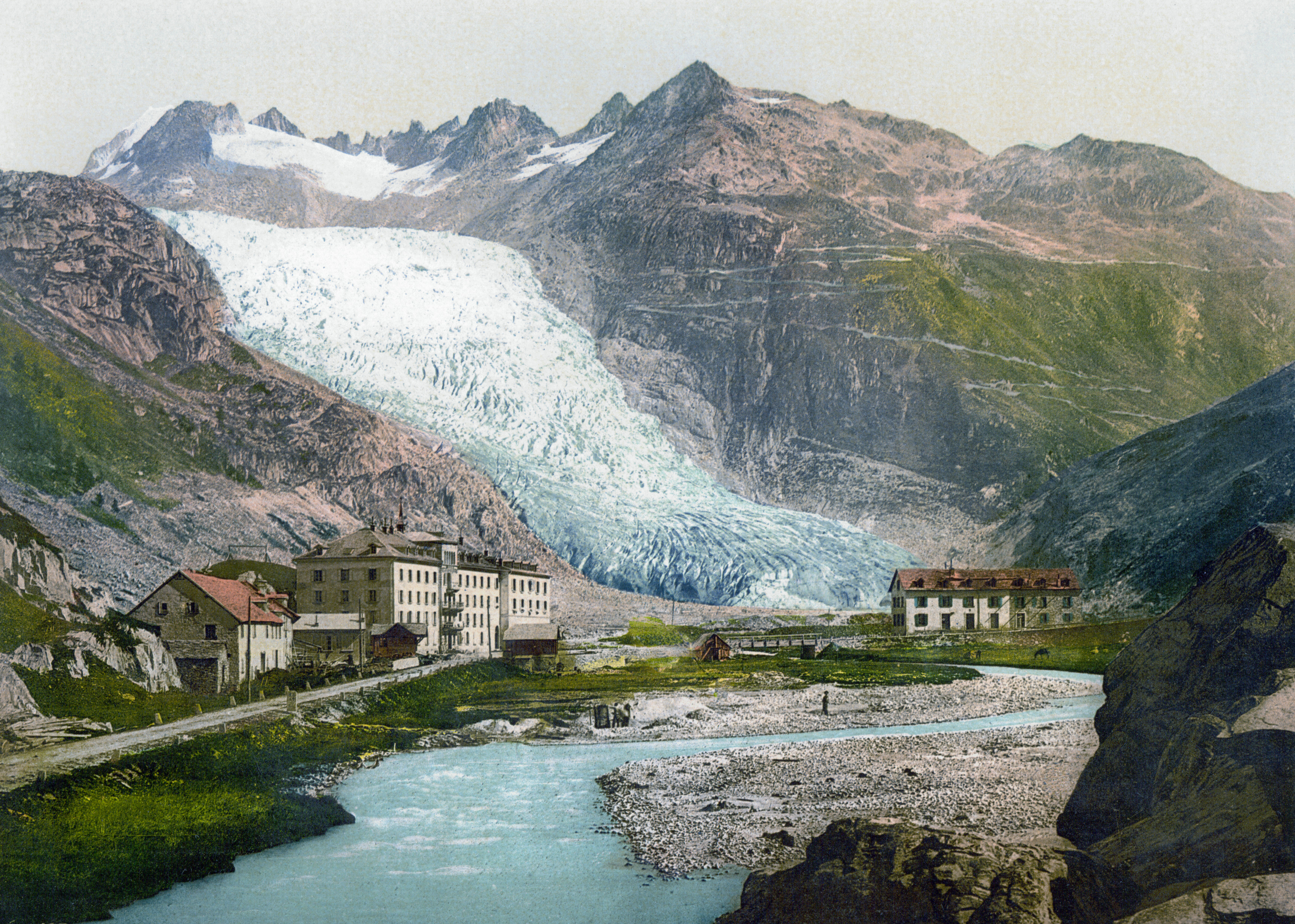
Gletch and the Rhone glacier in 1900

The municipality of Obergoms occupies the uppermost reaches of the valley of the Rhone, extending up to and including the Rhone glacier that feeds the river. It is surrounded on all but its downstream boundary by high mountains, and forms the junction of routes over the Grimsel, Furka, Nufenen and the Gries Passes, as well as the lower level route down the Rhone valley towards Brig. With the exception of the Gries Pass, which is traversed only by a track, all these passes carry paved roads. The Furka–Oberalp railway line also passes through the municipality, with its current route entering the western portal of the Furka Base Tunnel at Oberwald, whilst its earlier route, now preserved as a heritage railway, passes over the Furka Pass.

The lowest settlement of Obergoms is Ulrichen, which lies in the Rhone valley at the foot of the Nufenen and Gries Passes. The route to both passes initially passes through the side valley of the Agene, and the municipality includes that valley, its surrounding slopes, the Griessee lake at its head, and the Gries glacier that feeds it. To the south of the lake and glacier, the municipality reaches as far as the border with Italy, a border crossed by the Greis Pass, whilst to the east it reaches the border with Bedretto in the canton of Ticino at the summit of the Nufenen Pass.

The next settlement up the Rhone valley is Obergesteln, which is located on a terminal moraine of the Rhone glacier in the Rhone valley, at an elevation of 1,353 m (4,439 ft). Obergesteln is overlooked by the mountains of the Sidelhorn, to the north, and the Pizzo Gallina, to the south.

Obergesteln is followed by Oberwald, at 1,370 m (4,490 ft) on the right (north) bank of the Rhone, and Unterwassern, on the opposite bank of the Rhone. Beyond Oberwald, the municipality continues up the valley of the Rhone to Gletsch, at 1,757 m (5,764 ft) and Belvedere, at 2,271 m (7,451 ft). From Gletsch, the Grimsel Pass climbs to the north, over the border into the canton of Bern. Belvedere overlooks the Rhone glacier, whilst the Furka Pass climbs on to the border with the canton of Uri.

Obergoms has an area, as of 2011, of 155.8 square kilometers (60.2 mi^{2}). Of this area, 26.0% is used for agricultural purposes, while 9.6% is forested. Of the rest of the land, 1.0% is settled (buildings or roads) and 63.3% is unproductive land.

== Demographics ==
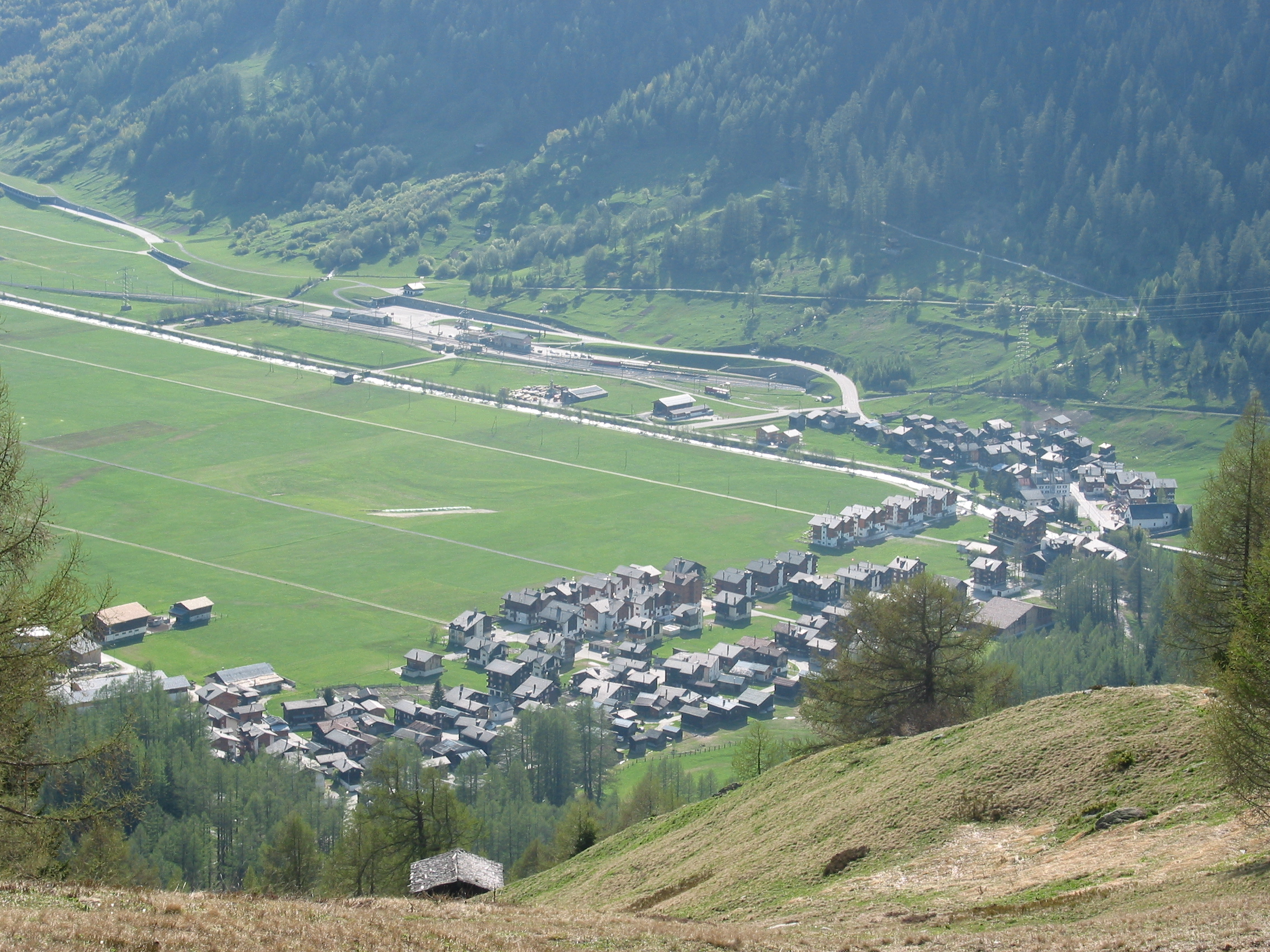
View of Oberwald in Obergoms

Obergoms has a population (as of December 2020) of 654. As of 2008, 11.3% of the population are resident foreign nationals. Over the last 10 years (1999–2009 ) the population has changed at a rate of -5.7%. It has changed at a rate of -2.2% due to migration and at a rate of -2.2% due to births and deaths.

As of 2008, the gender distribution of the population was 52.3% male and 47.7% female. The population was made up of 338 Swiss men (46.4% of the population) and 43 (5.9%) non-Swiss men. There were 308 Swiss women (42.3%) and 39 (5.4%) non-Swiss women.

The age distribution of the population (as of 2000) is children and teenagers (0–19 years old) make up 20.6% of the population, while adults (20–64 years old) make up 61.2% and seniors (over 64 years old) make up 18.2%.

As of 2009, the construction rate of new housing units was 30.2 new units per 1000 residents.

=== Obergesteln demographics ===
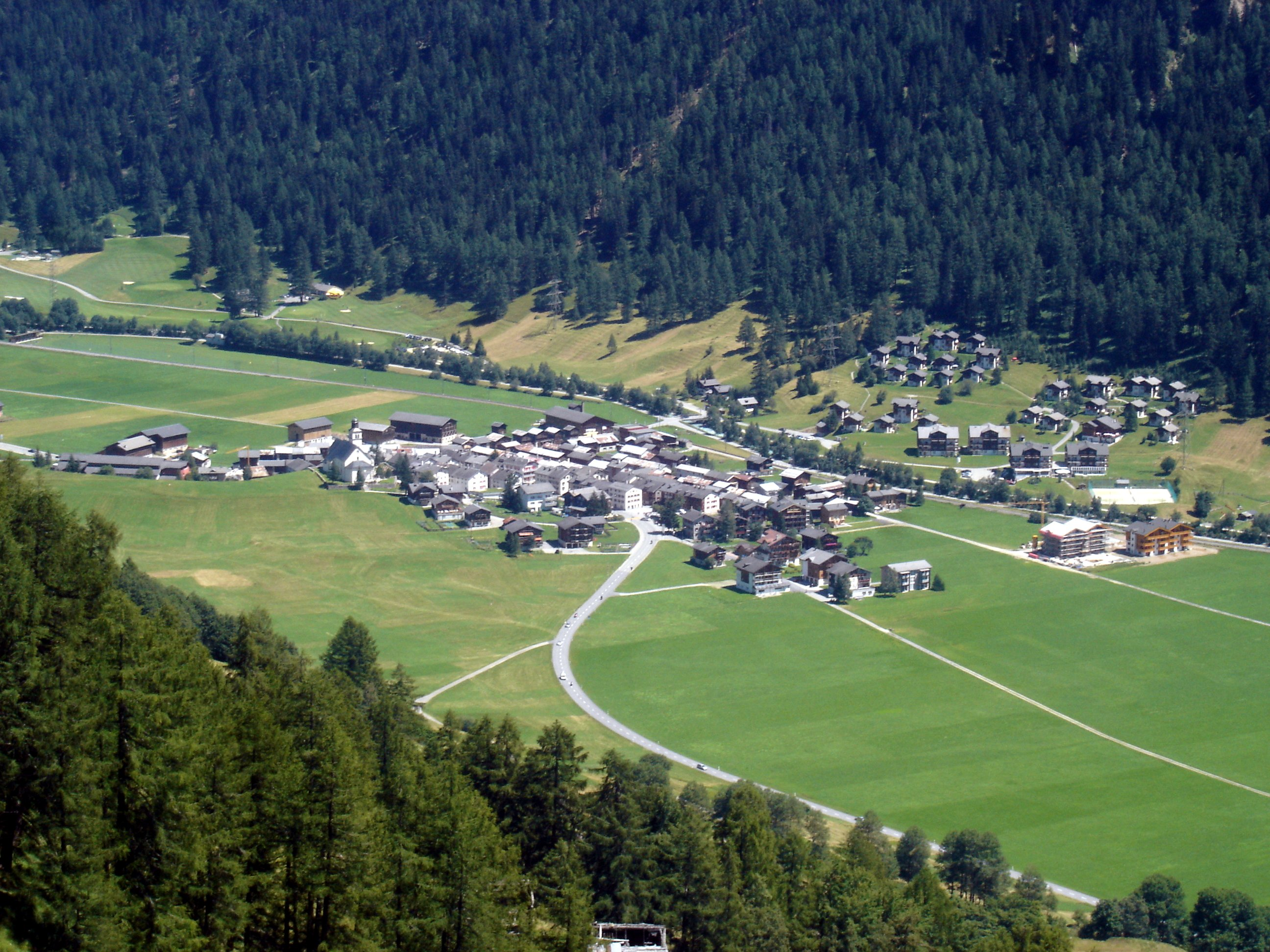
Obergesteln village

Most of the population, in Obergesteln as of 2000, speaks German (183 or 93.8%) as their first language, Serbo-Croatian is the second most common (8 or 4.1%) and Tschechisch is the third (2 or 1.0%). There is 1 person who speaks French.

Of the population in the municipality 115 or about 59.0% were born in Obergesteln and lived there in 2000. There were 49 or 25.1% who were born in the same canton, while 11 or 5.6% were born somewhere else in Switzerland, and 18 or 9.2% were born outside of Switzerland.

As of 2000, there were 69 people who were single and never married in the municipality. There were 108 married individuals, 14 widows or widowers and 4 individuals who are divorced.

There were 34 households that consist of only one person and 3 households with five or more people. Out of a total of 92 households that answered this question, 37.0% were households made up of just one person. Of the rest of the households, there are 28 married couples without children, 24 married couples with children There was one single parent with a child or children. There were 2 households that were made up of unrelated people and 3 households that were made up of some sort of institution or another collective housing.

In 2000 there were 39 single family homes (or 32.0% of the total) out of a total of 122 inhabited buildings. There were 67 multi-family buildings (54.9%), along with 9 multi-purpose buildings that were mostly used for housing (7.4%) and 7 other use buildings (commercial or industrial) that also had some housing (5.7%).

In 2000, a total of 88 apartments (35.1% of the total) were permanently occupied, while 148 apartments (59.0%) were seasonally occupied and 15 apartments (6.0%) were empty.

=== Oberwald demographics ===
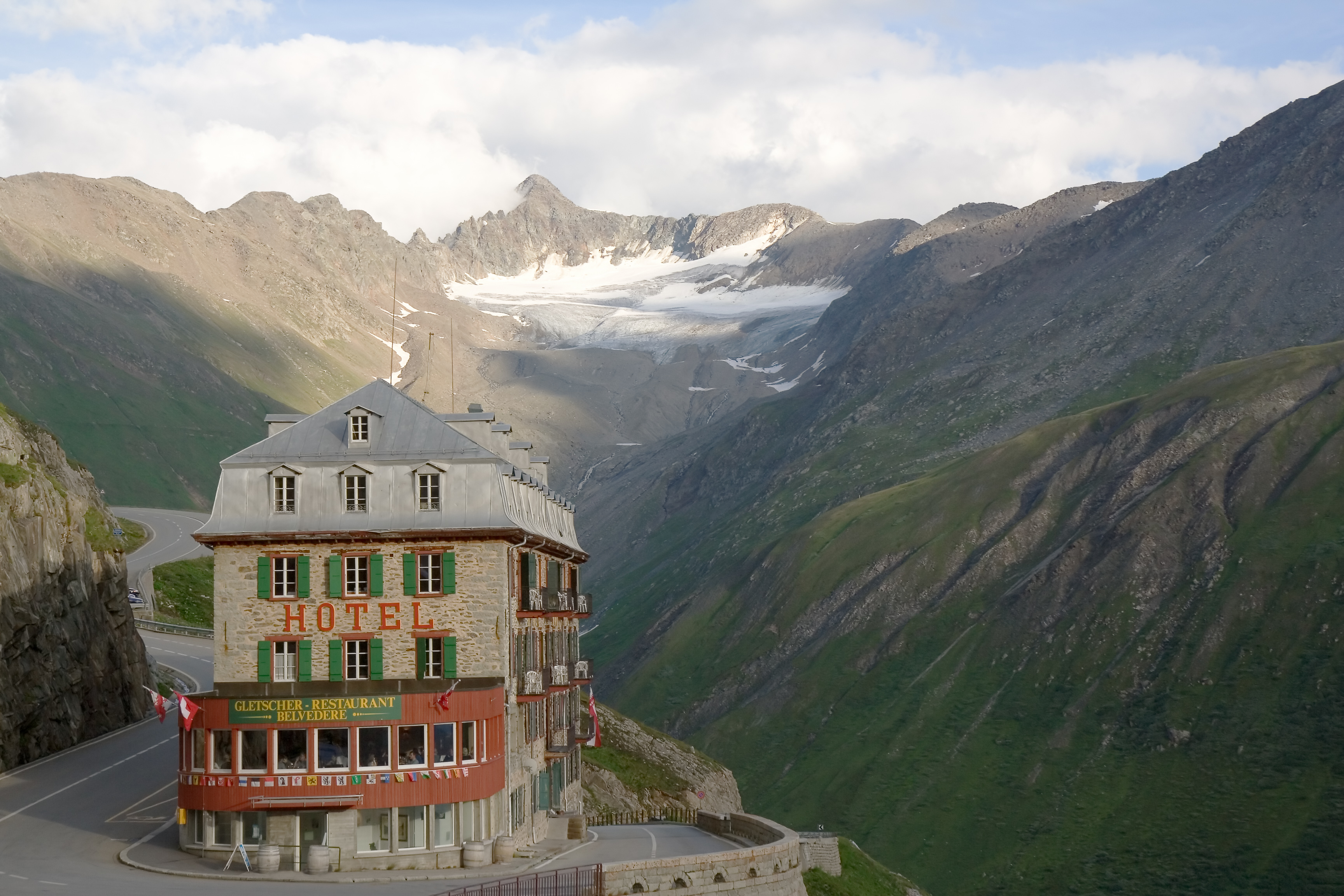
Hotel Belvedere in Oberwald

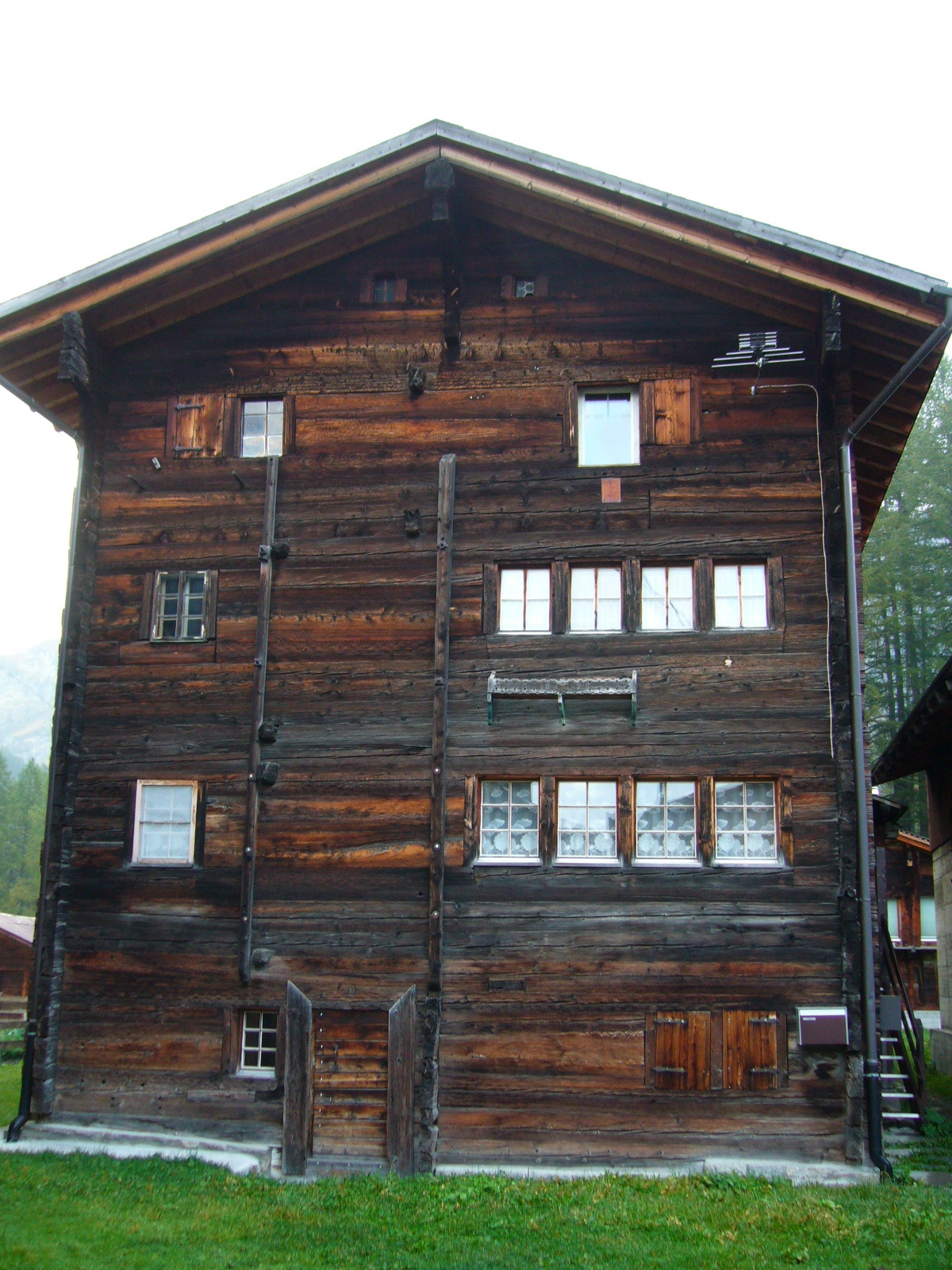
House in Oberwald

Most of the population, in Oberwald as of 2000, speaks German (249 or 95.8%) as their first language, Serbo-Croatian is the second most common (6 or 2.3%) and Italian is the third (2 or 0.8%). There is 1 person who speaks French.

Of the population in the municipality 155 or about 59.6% were born in Oberwald and lived there in 2000. There were 48 or 18.5% who were born in the same canton, while 30 or 11.5% were born somewhere else in Switzerland, and 19 or 7.3% were born outside of Switzerland.

As of 2000, there were 97 people who were single and never married in the municipality. There were 142 married individuals, 11 widows or widowers and 10 individuals who are divorced.

There were 44 households that consist of only one person and 5 households with five or more people. Out of a total of 117 households that answered this question, 37.6% were households made up of just one person and there was 1 adult who lived with their parents. Of the rest of the households, there are 31 married couples without children, 32 married couples with children There were 2 single parents with a child or children. There were 2 households that were made up of unrelated people and 5 households that were made up of some sort of institution or another collective housing.

In 2000 there were 37 single family homes (or 23.6% of the total) out of a total of 157 inhabited buildings. There were 83 multi-family buildings (52.9%), along with 16 multi-purpose buildings that were mostly used for housing (10.2%) and 21 other use buildings (commercial or industrial) that also had some housing (13.4%).

In 2000, a total of 112 apartments (24.1% of the total) were permanently occupied, while 331 apartments (71.3%) were seasonally occupied and 21 apartments (4.5%) were empty.

=== Ulrichen demographics ===
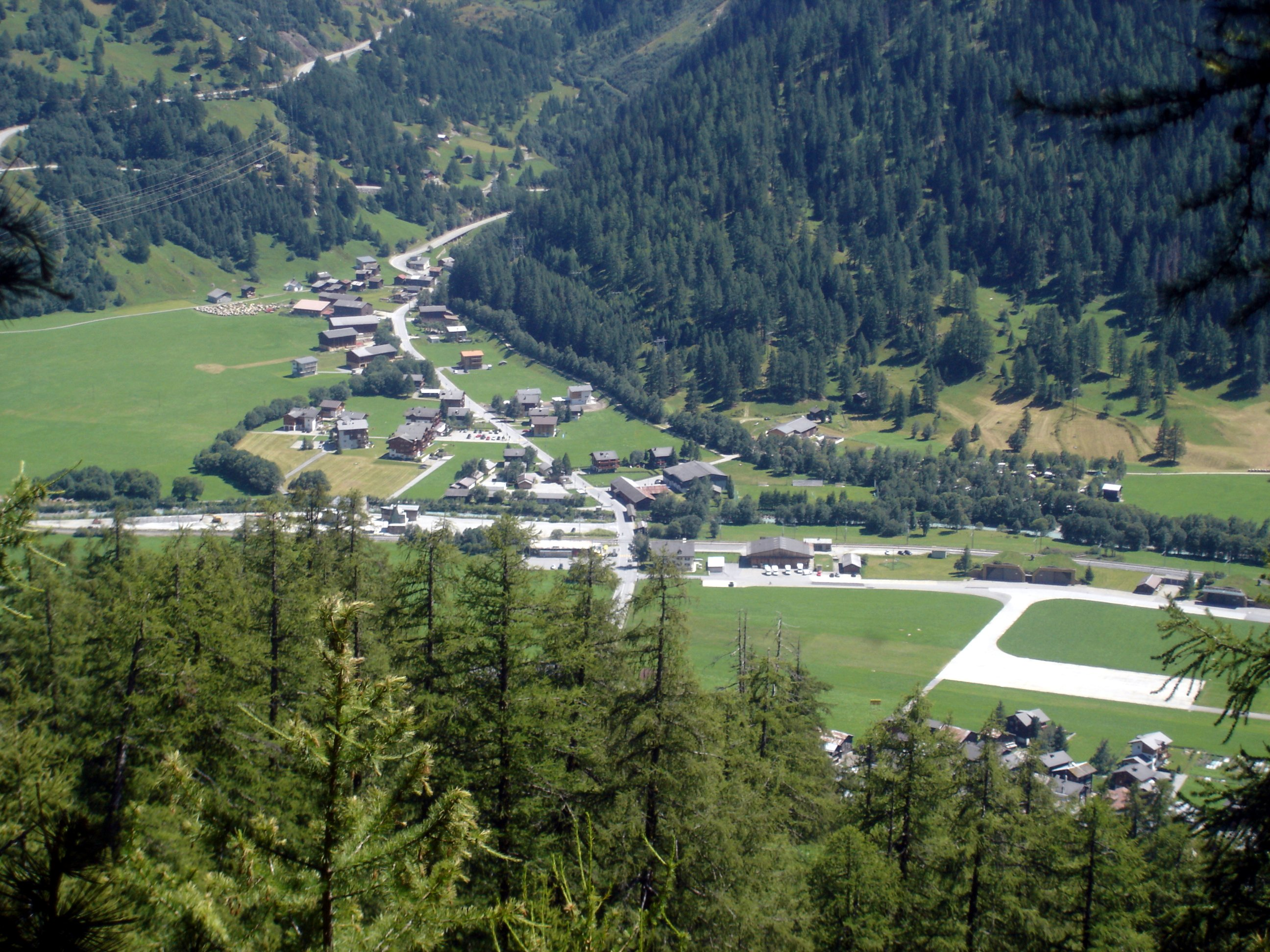
Ulrichen village

Most of the population, in Ulrichen as of 2000, speaks German (213 or 96.4%) as their first language, Italian is the second most common (3 or 1.4%) and Portuguese is the third (3 or 1.4%).

Of the population in the municipality 141 or about 63.8% were born in Ulrichen and lived there in 2000. There were 47 or 21.3% who were born in the same canton, while 16 or 7.2% were born somewhere else in Switzerland, and 17 or 7.7% were born outside of Switzerland. As of 2000, there were 93 people who were single and never married in the municipality. There were 119 married individuals, 9 widows or widowers and individuals who are divorced.

There were 24 households that consist of only one person and 8 households with five or more people. Out of a total of 89 households that answered this question, 27.0% were households made up of just one person and there was 1 adult who lived with their parents. Of the rest of the households, there are 26 married couples without children, 33 married couples with children There were 3 households that were made up of unrelated people and 2 households that were made up of some sort of institution or another collective housing.

In 2000 there were 41 single family homes (or 38.0% of the total) out of a total of 108 inhabited buildings. There were 47 multi-family buildings (43.5%), along with 11 multi-purpose buildings that were mostly used for housing (10.2%) and 9 other use buildings (commercial or industrial) that also had some housing (8.3%).

In 2000, a total of 85 apartments (36.2% of the total) were permanently occupied, while 129 apartments (54.9%) were seasonally occupied and 21 apartments (8.9%) were empty.

== Historic Population ==
The historical population is given in the following chart:

== Sights ==
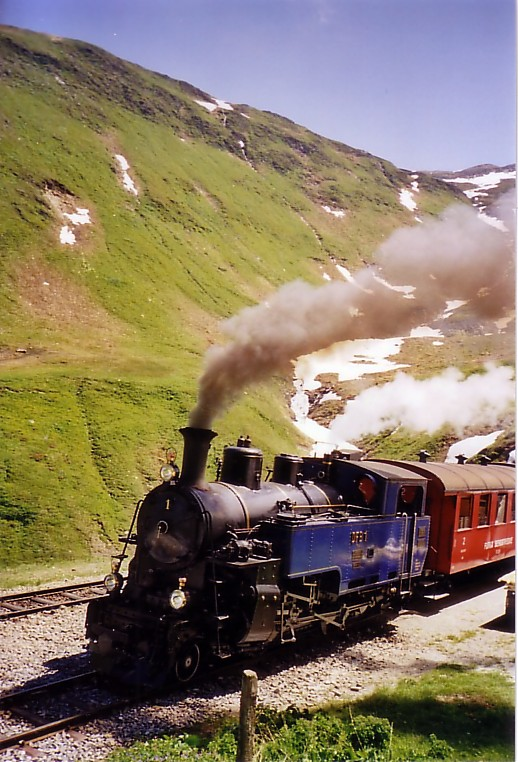
Furkabahn cog-wheel railway

The entire villages of Obergesteln and Ulrichen, the Gletsch region and the Furkabahn Cog-Wheel Railway are all designated as part of the Inventory of Swiss Heritage Sites.

== Politics ==
In the 2007 federal election in Obergesteln, the most popular party was the CVP which received 71.92% of the vote. The next three most popular parties were the SVP (12.47%), the FDP (7.48%) and the SP (6.69%). In the federal election, a total of 112 votes were cast, and the voter turnout was 64.7%.

In Oberwald, the most popular party was the CVP which received 68.83% of the vote. The next three most popular parties were the SVP (21%), the SP (5.56%) and the FDP (2.98%). In the federal election, a total of 110 votes were cast, and the voter turnout was 61.1%.

In Ulrichen, the most popular party was the CVP which received 58.16% of the vote. The next three most popular parties were the SVP (18.89%), the SP (15.11%) and the FDP (6.48%). In the federal election, a total of 111 votes were cast, and the voter turnout was 63.1%.

== Economy ==
As of 2010, Obergoms had an unemployment rate of 2.3%. As of 2008, there were 64 people employed in the primary economic sector and about 27 businesses involved in this sector. 86 people were employed in the secondary sector and there were 11 businesses in this sector. 239 people were employed in the tertiary sector, with 50 businesses in this sector.

Of the working population, 7.9% used public transportation to get to work, and 40.6% used a private car.

=== Obergesteln economy ===
There were 97 residents of Obergesteln who were employed in some capacity, of which females made up 39.2% of the workforce. In 2008 the total number of full-time equivalent jobs was 94. The number of jobs in the primary sector was 11, all of which were in agriculture. The number of jobs in the secondary sector was 42 of which 3 or (7.1%) were in manufacturing and 39 (92.9%) were in construction. The number of jobs in the tertiary sector was 41. In the tertiary sector; 2 or 4.9% were in wholesale or retail sales or the repair of motor vehicles, 30 or 73.2% were in a hotel or restaurant, 1 was the insurance or financial industry, 1 was in education.

In 2000, there were 36 workers who commuted into the municipality and 32 workers who commuted away. The municipality is a net importer of workers, with about 1.1 workers entering the municipality for every one leaving. Of the working population, % used public transportation to get to work, and % used a private car.

=== Oberwald economy ===
There were 138 residents of Oberwald who were employed in some capacity, of which females made up 39.1% of the workforce. In 2008 the total number of full-time equivalent jobs was 147. The number of jobs in the primary sector was 18, of which 11 were in agriculture and 6 were in forestry or lumber production. The number of jobs in the secondary sector was 22, all of which were in manufacturing. The number of jobs in the tertiary sector was 107. In the tertiary sector; 12 or 11.2% were in wholesale or retail sales or the repair of motor vehicles, 23 or 21.5% were in the movement and storage of goods, 62 or 57.9% were in a hotel or restaurant, 1 was the insurance or financial industry, 2 or 1.9% were technical professionals or scientists, 1 was in education.

In 2000, there were 48 workers who commuted into the municipality and 41 workers who commuted away. The municipality is a net importer of workers, with about 1.2 workers entering the municipality for every one leaving.

=== Ulrichen economy ===
There were 107 residents of Ulrichen who were employed in some capacity, of which females made up 40.2% of the workforce. In 2008 the total number of full-time equivalent jobs was 85. The number of jobs in the primary sector was 11, all of which were in agriculture. The number of jobs in the secondary sector was 16, all of which were in manufacturing. The number of jobs in the tertiary sector was 58. In the tertiary sector; 10 or 17.2% were in wholesale or retail sales or the repair of motor vehicles, 9 or 15.5% were in the movement and storage of goods, 33 or 56.9% were in a hotel or restaurant, 2 or 3.4% were in education.

In 2000, there were 38 workers who commuted into the municipality and 44 workers who commuted away. The municipality is a net exporter of workers, with about 1.2 workers leaving the municipality for every one entering.

== Transport ==
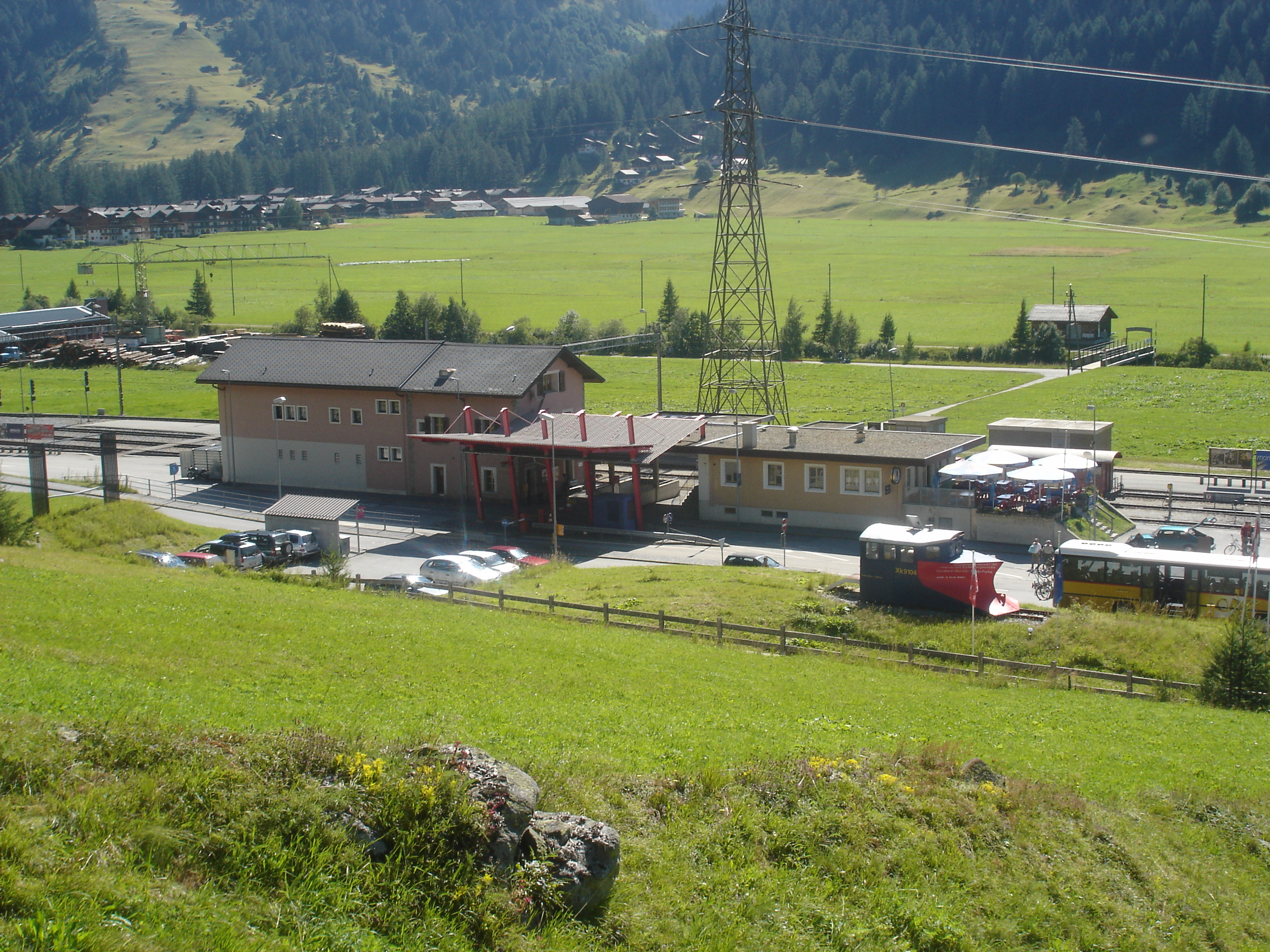
Oberwald train station

The municipality is served by Ulrichen station, Obergestein station and Oberwald station, all of which are on the Furka-Oberalp line of the Matterhorn Gotthard Bahn (MGB). This line provides year-round service between Visp, Brig, Andermatt and Göschenen, with trains running hourly in both directions and stopping at all three stations. Additionally Oberwald station is served several times a day by the Glacier Express train from Zermatt to St Moritz or Davos. From Oberwald station, the Dampfbahn Furka-Bergstrecke operates summer steam locomotive hauled services over the old MGB line across the Furka pass, a line which has now been largely superseded by the Furka Base Tunnel.

The low level road route down the Rhone valley to Brig is open all year, but the roads from Obergoms across the Furka, Grimsel and Nufenen passes are open only in summer. The MGB provides a car shuttle train through the Furka Base Tunnel from Oberwald to Realp, avoiding the road over the Furka pass.

Whilst the passes are open, PostBus Switzerland operates services across each pass from Oberwald several times a day. The service across the Grimsel pass operates to Meiringen, that over the Nufenen pass to Airolo, and that over the Furka pass to Andermatt.

== Education ==
During the 2010–2011 school year there were a total of 57 students in the Obergoms school system. The education system in the Canton of Valais allows young children to attend one year of non-obligatory Kindergarten. During that school year, there was one kindergarten class (KG1 or KG2) and 15 kindergarten students. The canton's school system requires students to attend six years of primary school. In Obergoms there were a total of 4 classes and 57 students in the primary school. The secondary school program consists of three lower, obligatory years of schooling (orientation classes), followed by three to five years of optional, advanced schools. All the lower and upper secondary students from Obergoms attend their school in a neighboring municipality.

In Obergesteln about 75 or (38.5%) of the population have completed non-mandatory upper secondary education, and 16 or (8.2%) have completed additional higher education (either university or a Fachhochschule). Of the 16 who completed tertiary schooling, 87.5% were Swiss men, 12.5% were Swiss women. As of 2000, there were 12 students in Obergesteln who came from another municipality, while 17 residents attended schools outside the municipality.

In Oberwald about 93 or (35.8%) of the population have completed non-mandatory upper secondary education, and 12 or (4.6%) have completed additional higher education (either university or a Fachhochschule). Of the 12 who completed tertiary schooling, 83.3% were Swiss men, 8.3% were Swiss women. As of 2000, there were 9 students in Oberwald who came from another municipality, while 19 residents attended schools outside the municipality.

In Ulrichen about 72 or (32.6%) of the population have completed non-mandatory upper secondary education, and 14 or (6.3%) have completed additional higher education (either university or a Fachhochschule). Of the 14 who completed tertiary schooling, 71.4% were Swiss men, 14.3% were Swiss women. As of 2000, there were 16 students in Ulrichen who came from another municipality, while 18 residents attended schools outside the municipality.

== Religion ==
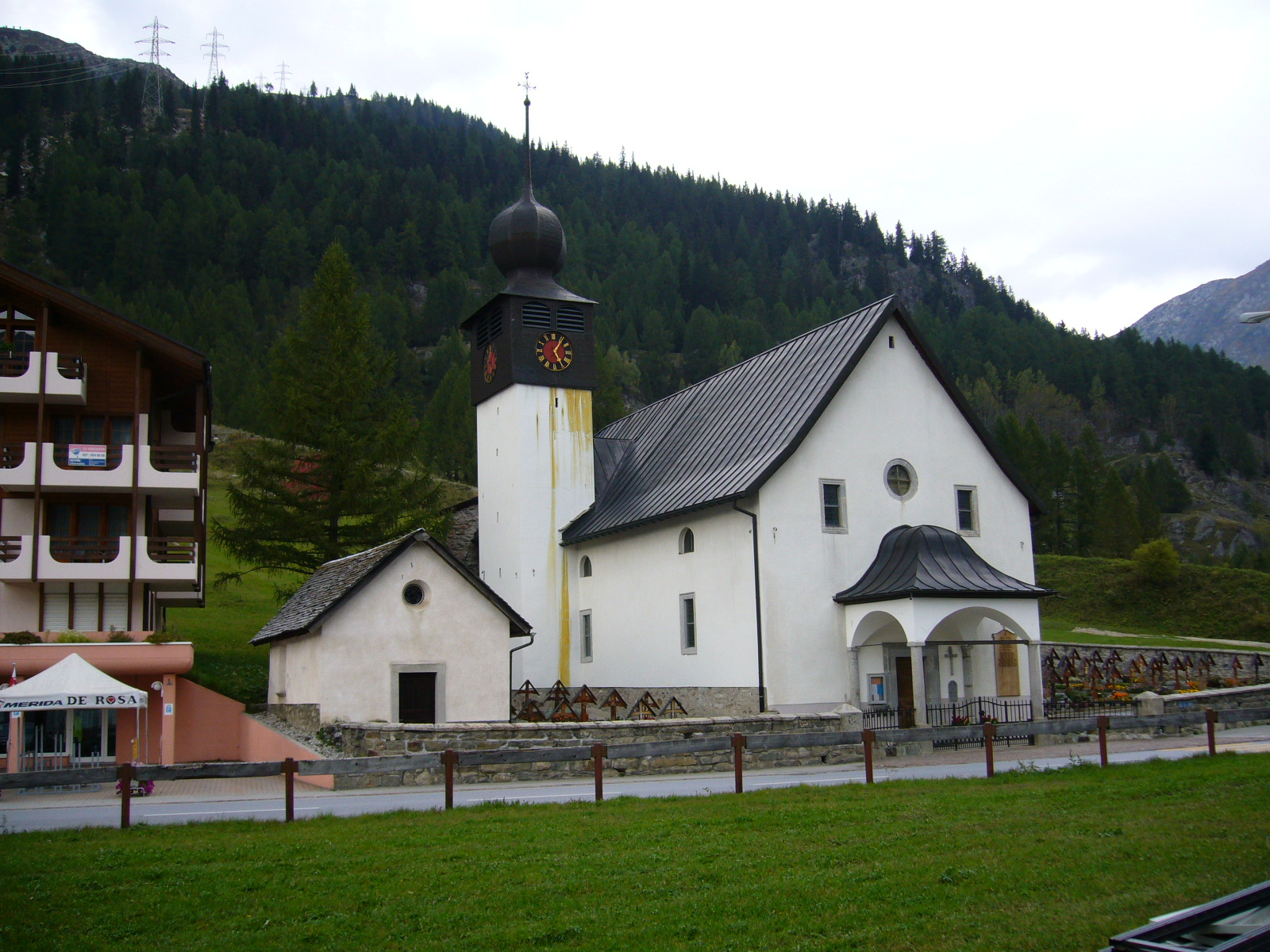
Church in Oberwald

From the 2000 census, in Obergesteln, 171 or 87.7% were Roman Catholic, while 3 or 1.5% belonged to the Swiss Reformed Church. Of the rest of the population, there were 10 members of an Orthodox church (or about 5.13% of the population). 7 (or about 3.59% of the population) belonged to no church, are agnostic or atheist, and 4 individuals (or about 2.05% of the population) did not answer the question.

In Oberwald, 218 or 83.8% were Roman Catholic, while 14 or 5.4% belonged to the Swiss Reformed Church. Of the rest of the population, there were 8 members of an Orthodox church (or about 3.08% of the population). There were 2 (or about 0.77% of the population) who were Islamic. 10 (or about 3.85% of the population) belonged to no church, are agnostic or atheist, and 8 individuals (or about 3.08% of the population) did not answer the question.

In Ulrichen, 210 or 95.0% were Roman Catholic, while 7 or 3.2% belonged to the Swiss Reformed Church. Of the rest of the population, there was 1 member of an Orthodox church. 1 (or about 0.45% of the population) belonged to no church, are agnostic or atheist, and 2 individuals (or about 0.90% of the population) did not answer the question.

== Climate ==
Climate data for Obergoms (Ulrichen before 2009) 1991–2020
Month	Jan	Feb	Mar	Apr	May	Jun	Jul	Aug	Sep	Oct	Nov	Dec	Year
Mean daily maximum °C (°F)	−0.8 (30.6)	1.7 (35.1)	5.9 (42.6)	9.9 (49.8)	14.9 (58.8)	19.4 (66.9)	21.8 (71.2)	21.3 (70.3)	17.3 (63.1)	12.6 (54.7)	5.1 (41.2)	−0.3 (31.5)	10.7 (51.3)
Daily mean °C (°F)	−7.2 (19.0)	−5.4 (22.3)	−0.4 (31.3)	3.9 (39.0)	8.7 (47.7)	12.6 (54.7)	14.6 (58.3)	14.0 (57.2)	10.0 (50.0)	5.5 (41.9)	−0.7 (30.7)	−5.6 (21.9)	4.2 (39.6)
Mean daily minimum °C (°F)	−13.0 (8.6)	−12.1 (10.2)	−6.5 (20.3)	−1.8 (28.8)	2.4 (36.3)	5.5 (41.9)	7.5 (45.5)	7.3 (45.1)	3.8 (38.8)	0.2 (32.4)	−5.2 (22.6)	−10.6 (12.9)	−1.9 (28.6)
Average precipitation mm (inches)	97 (3.8)	81 (3.2)	89 (3.5)	88 (3.5)	116 (4.6)	95 (3.7)	86 (3.4)	100 (3.9)	89 (3.5)	107 (4.2)	124 (4.9)	110 (4.3)	1,183 (46.6)
Average snowfall cm (inches)	114.8 (45.2)	132.6 (52.2)	85.4 (33.6)	26.3 (10.4)	7.1 (2.8)	0.2 (0.1)	0.0 (0.0)	0.0 (0.0)	0.1 (0.0)	13.5 (5.3)	81.5 (32.1)	116.6 (45.9)	578.1 (227.6)
Average precipitation days (≥ 1.0 mm)	9.6	9.0	9.0	8.9	11.3	10.9	11.0	11.3	9.0	9.2	10.6	10.2	120.0
Average snowy days (≥ 1.0 cm)	9.5	10.1	8.3	4.4	0.9	0.1	0.0	0.0	0.1	1.4	8.9	10.8	54.5
Average relative humidity (%)	84	79	74	69	69	70	70	73	76	79	84	85	76
Mean monthly sunshine hours	71	104	153	153	171	199	216	192	161	126	67	54	1,665
Percentage possible sunshine	49	51	52	49	46	52	57	56	55	49	41	47	51
Source: MeteoSwiss (snow 1981–2010)
