= Oberwald =

- Former municipality
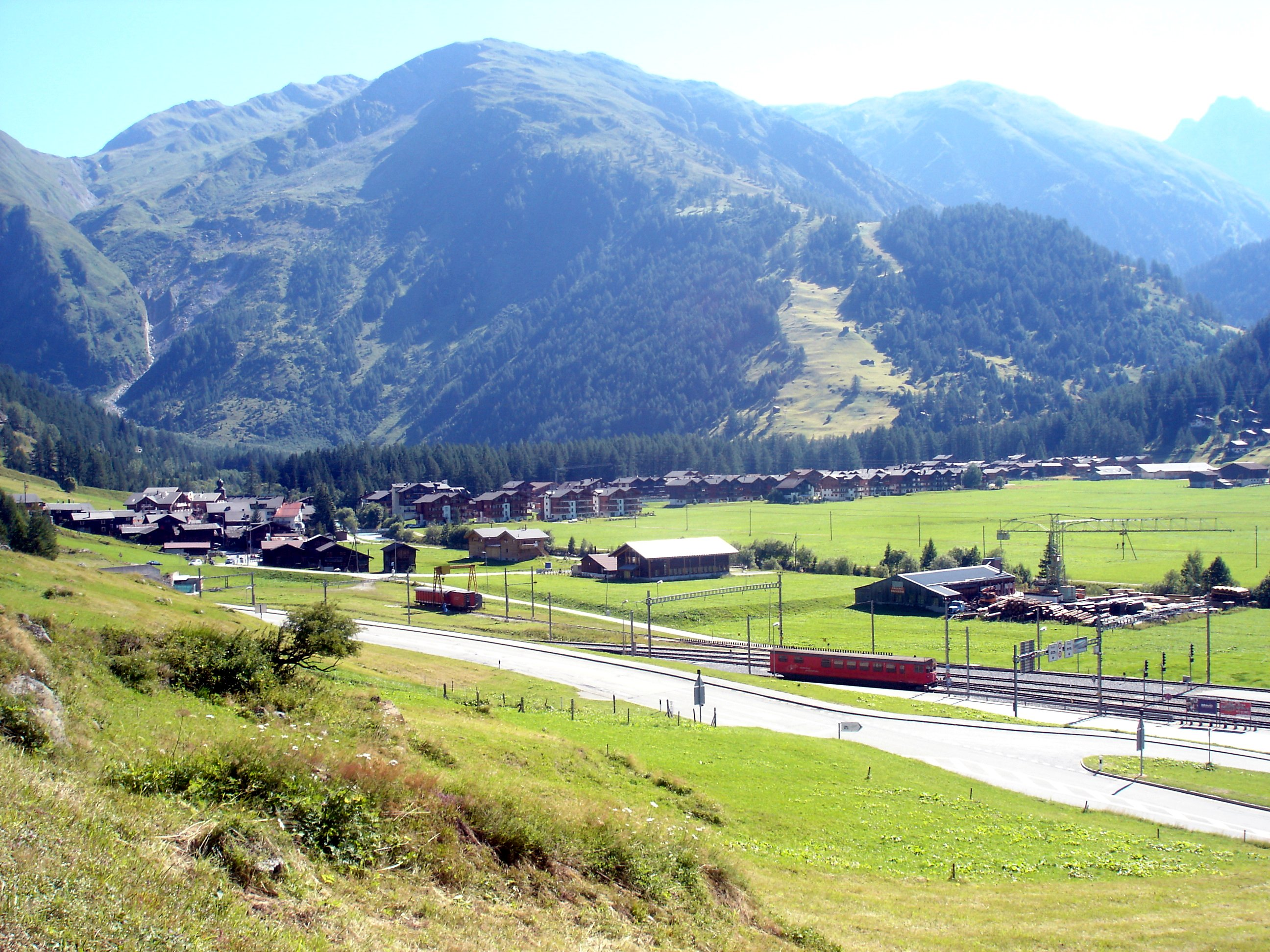

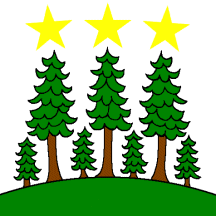
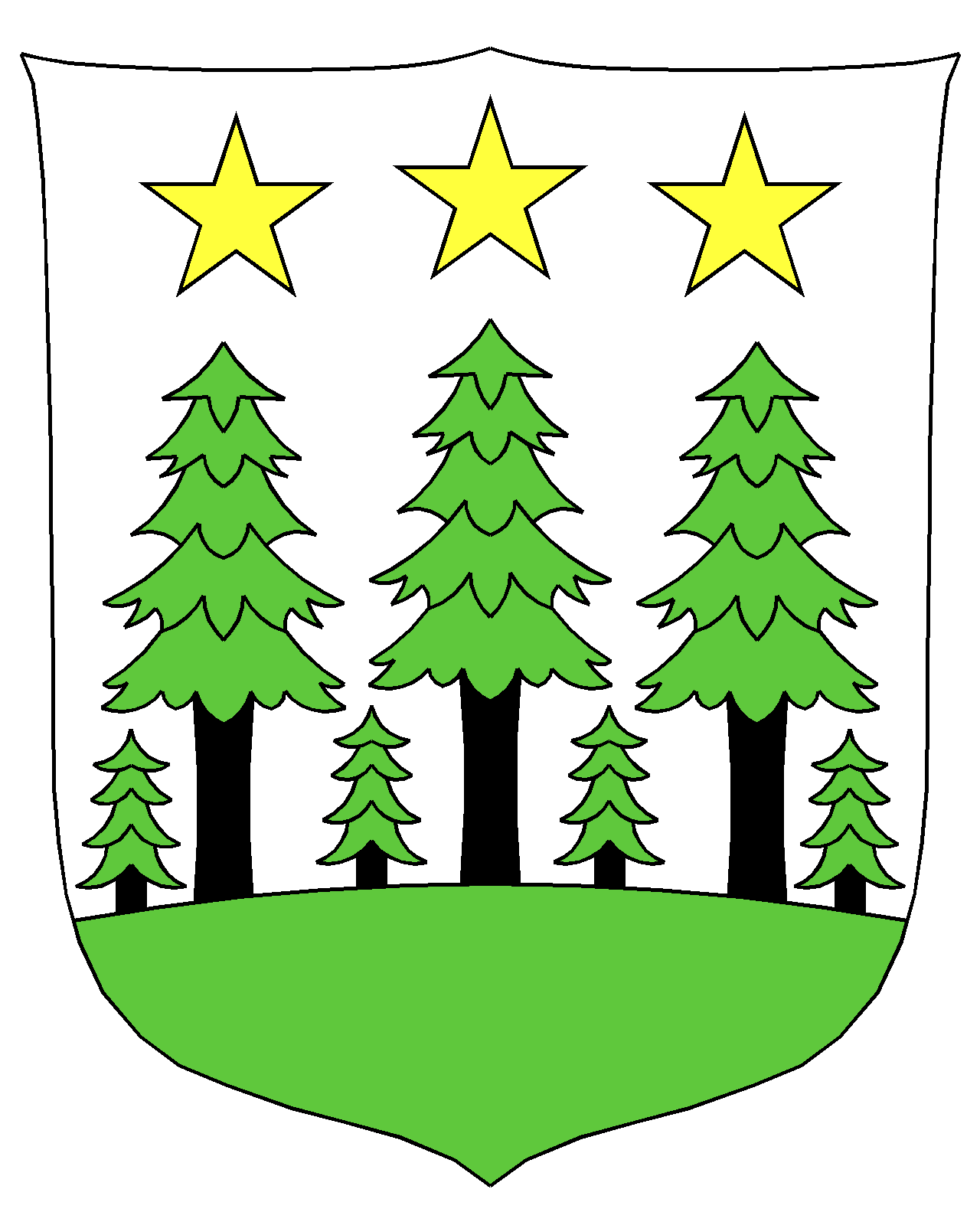
- Flag Coat of arms
- Location of Oberwald
- Location within Switzerland Location within Canton of Valais
- Coordinates: 46°32′N 8°21′E
- Country: Switzerland
- Canton: Valais
- District: Goms
- Municipality: Obergoms

Area
  - Total: 96.9 km^{2} (37.4 sq mi)
- Elevation: 1,377 m (4,518 ft)

Population (December 2007)
  - Total: 277
  - Density: 2.86/km^{2} (7.40/sq mi)
- Time zone: UTC+01:00 (CET)
  - Summer (DST): UTC+02:00 (CEST)
- Postal code: 3999
- SFOS number: 6066
- ISO 3166 code: CH-VS
- Localities: Gletsch
- Website: www.oberwald.ch

Oberwald is a village in the municipality of Obergoms in Goms District in the canton of Valais in Switzerland.

It is situated at an elevation of 1,377 m and had a population of 277 in December 2007. It is located at the end of the Goms, directly before the Furka and Grimsel passes, underneath the Rhône River source at the Rhône Glacier. It is also the startpoint of the Furka Tunnel and is served by Oberwald railway station. Most inhabitants live off tourism or sheep farming.

Oberwald was an independent municipality until January 1, 2009, when it merged with Ulrichen and Obergesteln to form the municipality of Obergoms.

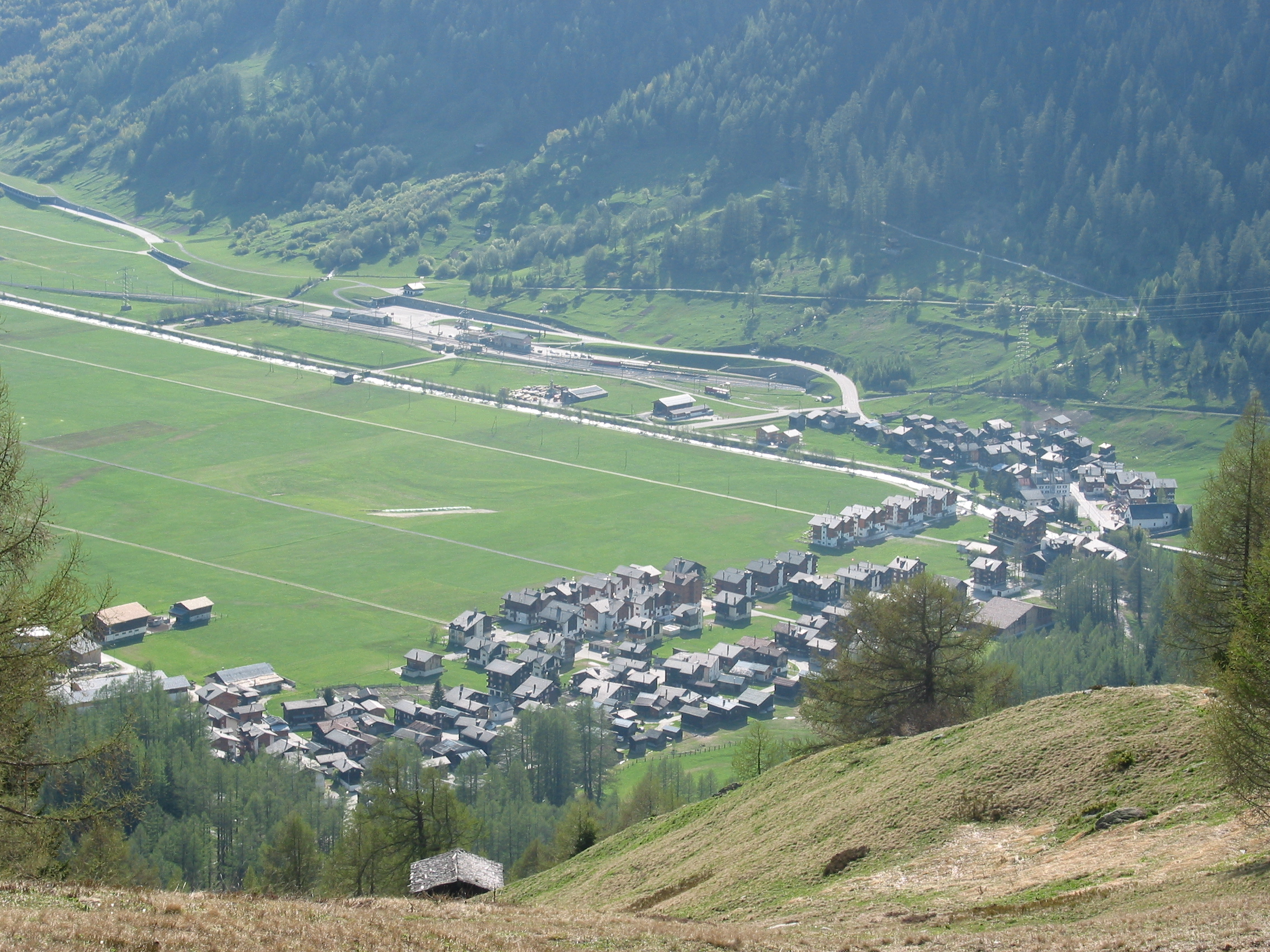
View of Oberwald from above

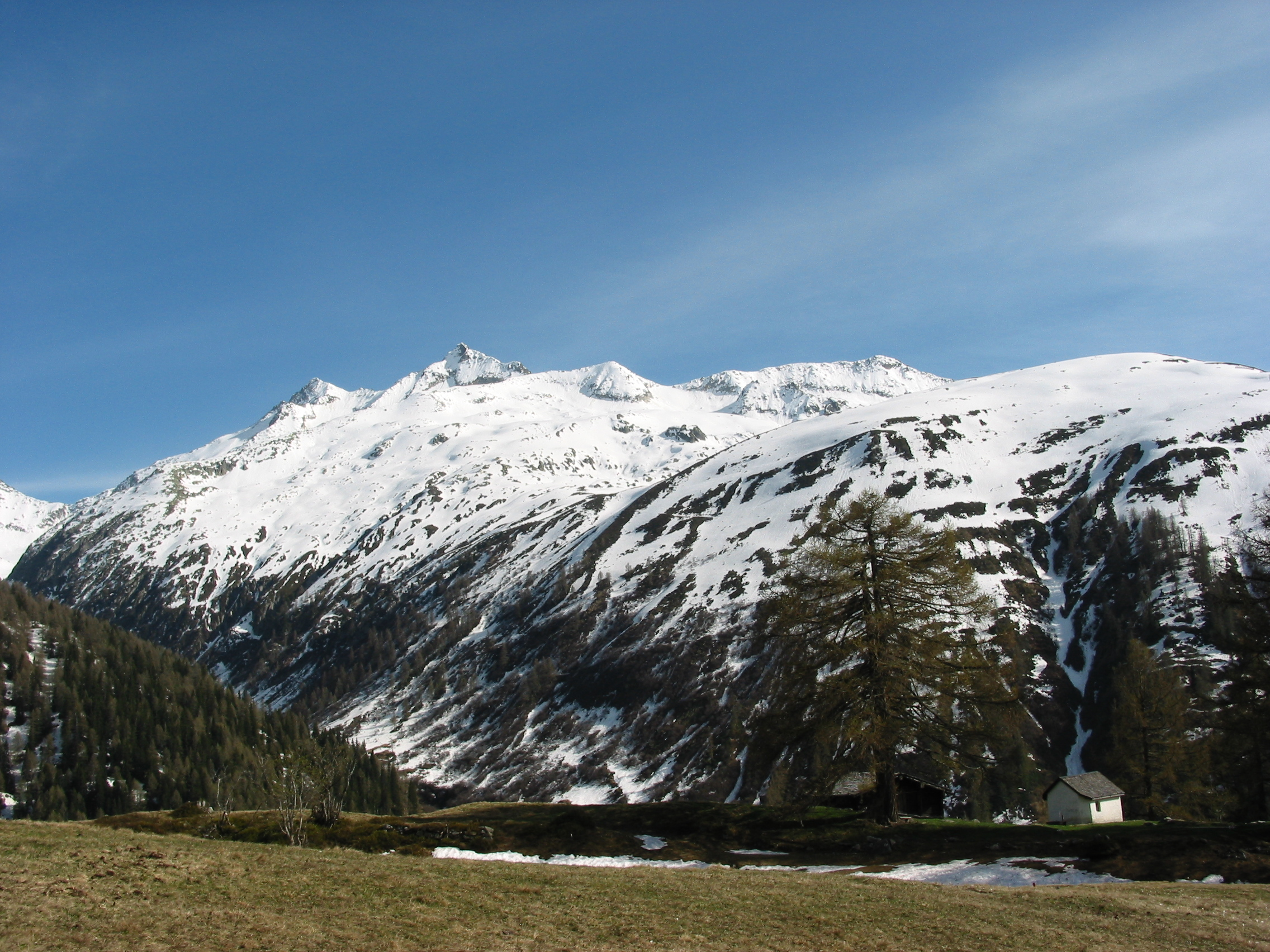
View of the mountains from Oberwald
