= Gletsch =

Hamlet in canton of Valais, Switzerland

Coordinates: 46°33′44″N 8°21′41″E

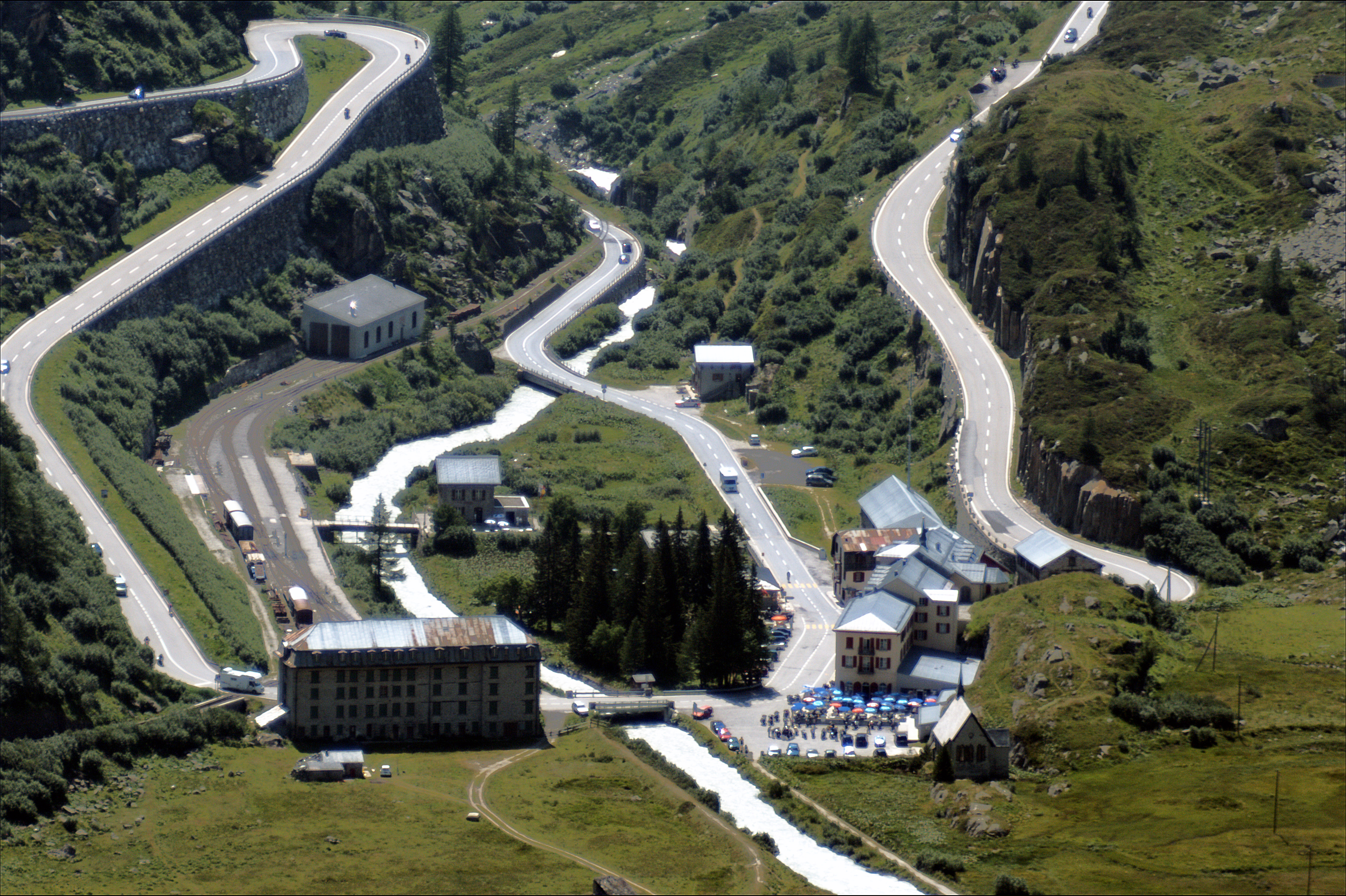
Gletsch with the Furka (left) and Grimsel roads (right)

Gletsch (German pronunciation: [ˈɡlɛtʃ]; 1,757 m (5,764 ft)) is a hamlet in the German-speaking half of the canton of Valais, located in the upper Rhone valley, called Obergoms ('Upper Goms'), 2.5 kilometres (1.6 mi), southeast below the Rhone Glacier's mouth and itself the headwaters of the Rhône. It is called Gletsch (some short of Gletscher, the German term for glacier), since the first building was the predecessor of the Hôtel Glacier du Rhône (c. 1860) built more or less just next to the glacier's mouth in 1830.

It belongs to the municipality of Obergoms.

Gletsch lies at the crossroads of the Grimsel Pass (leading to the Bernese Oberland) and the Furka Pass (leading to Andermatt, the central Swiss transport cross, and eventually either to Central Switzerland, or the Grisonian Surselva, or the Ticino). The Gletsch railway station is operated by the Furka Cogwheel Steam Railway.
