= Ulrichen =

- Former municipality
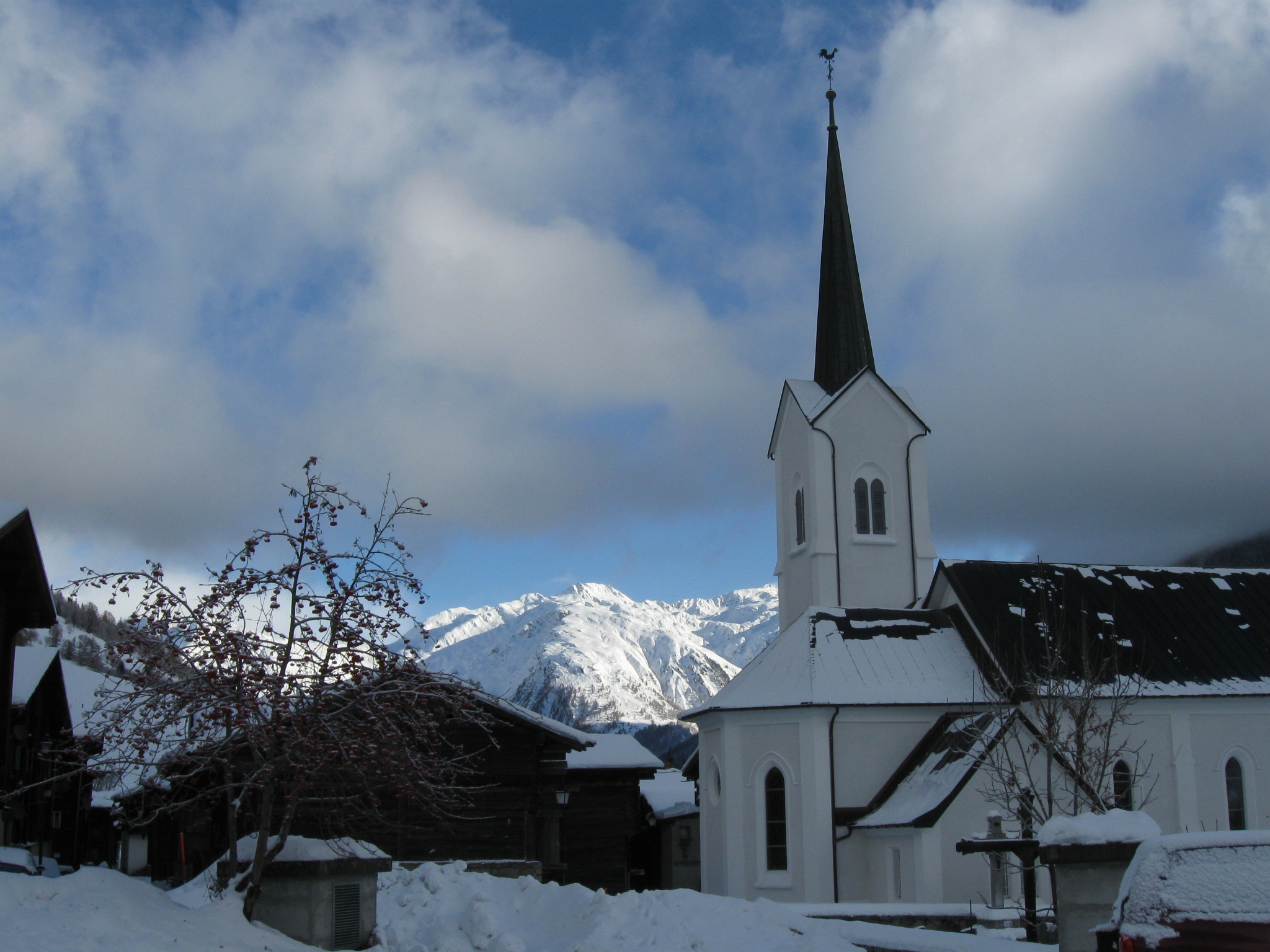
- Ulrichen in December 2009

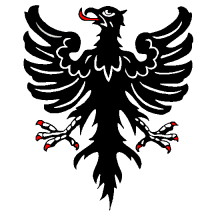
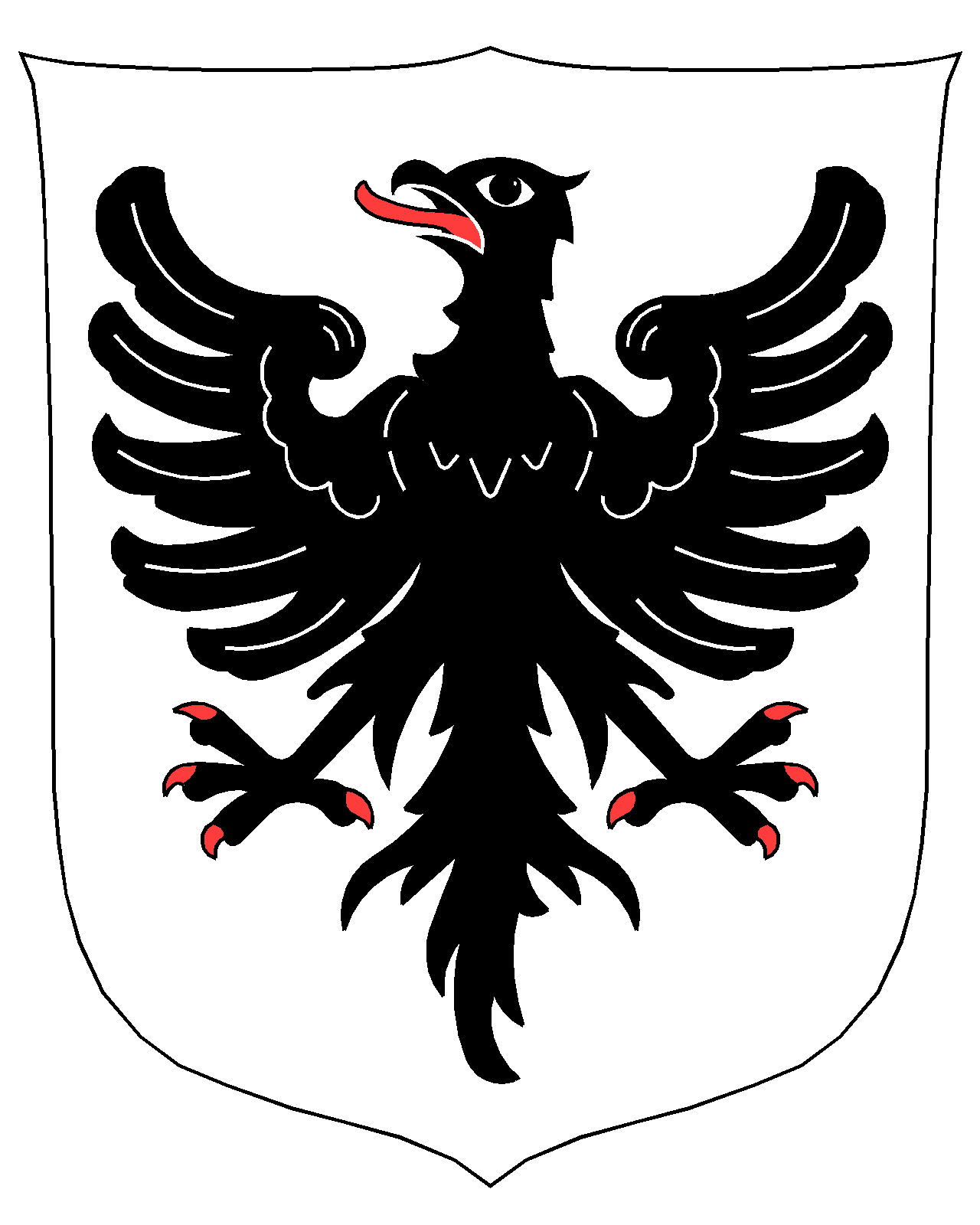
- Flag Coat of arms
- Location of Ulrichen
- Location within Switzerland Location within Canton of Valais
- Coordinates: 46°30′N 8°18′E
- Country: Switzerland
- Canton: Valais
- District: Goms
- Municipality: Obergoms

Area
  - Total: 44.4 km^{2} (17.1 sq mi)
- Elevation: 1,346 m (4,416 ft)

Population (December 2007)
  - Total: 219
  - Density: 4.93/km^{2} (12.8/sq mi)
- Time zone: UTC+01:00 (CET)
  - Summer (DST): UTC+02:00 (CEST)
- Postal code: 3988
- SFOS number: 6071
- ISO 3166 code: CH-VS
- Website: www.ulrichen.ch

Ulrichen is a village in the municipality of Obergoms in the district of Goms in the canton of Valais in Switzerland. The population (as of 2007) was 219.

Ulrichen was an independent municipality until January 1, 2009, when it merged with Oberwald and Obergesteln to form the municipality Obergoms.

In Ulrichen, an airport is located.

== Climate ==
Ulrichen has a Subarctic climate (Dfc) according to the Köppen Climate Classification, bordering a Warm-Summer humid continental climate (Dfb). Precipitation is spread evenly throughout the year. The town is known to receive high amounts of snow during the winter months.

Climate data for Ulrichen, elevation 1,346 m (4,416 ft), (1991–2020)
Month	Jan	Feb	Mar	Apr	May	Jun	Jul	Aug	Sep	Oct	Nov	Dec	Year
Mean daily maximum °C (°F)	−0.8 (30.6)	1.7 (35.1)	5.9 (42.6)	9.9 (49.8)	14.9 (58.8)	19.4 (66.9)	21.8 (71.2)	21.3 (70.3)	17.3 (63.1)	12.6 (54.7)	5.1 (41.2)	−0.3 (31.5)	10.7 (51.3)
Daily mean °C (°F)	−7.2 (19.0)	−5.4 (22.3)	−0.4 (31.3)	3.9 (39.0)	8.7 (47.7)	12.6 (54.7)	14.6 (58.3)	14.0 (57.2)	10.0 (50.0)	5.5 (41.9)	−0.7 (30.7)	−5.6 (21.9)	4.2 (39.6)
Mean daily minimum °C (°F)	−13.0 (8.6)	−12.1 (10.2)	−6.5 (20.3)	−1.8 (28.8)	2.4 (36.3)	5.5 (41.9)	7.5 (45.5)	7.3 (45.1)	3.8 (38.8)	0.2 (32.4)	−5.2 (22.6)	−10.6 (12.9)	−1.9 (28.6)
Average precipitation mm (inches)	97.0 (3.82)	81.4 (3.20)	89.3 (3.52)	87.6 (3.45)	116.0 (4.57)	95.3 (3.75)	86.3 (3.40)	100.4 (3.95)	88.9 (3.50)	106.7 (4.20)	124.2 (4.89)	109.7 (4.32)	1,182.8 (46.57)
Average snowfall cm (inches)	114.8 (45.2)	132.6 (52.2)	85.4 (33.6)	26.3 (10.4)	7.1 (2.8)	0.2 (0.1)	0.0 (0.0)	0.0 (0.0)	0.1 (0.0)	13.5 (5.3)	81.5 (32.1)	116.6 (45.9)	578.1 (227.6)
Average precipitation days (≥ 1.0 mm)	9.6	9.0	9.0	8.9	11.3	10.9	11.0	11.3	9.0	9.2	10.6	10.2	120.0
Average snowy days (≥ 1.0 cm)	9.5	10.1	8.3	4.4	0.9	0.1	0.0	0.0	0.1	1.4	8.9	10.8	54.5
Average relative humidity (%)	84	79	74	69	69	70	70	73	76	79	84	85	76
Mean monthly sunshine hours	70.9	103.6	152.7	153.0	170.5	199.2	215.6	192.1	160.7	126.0	66.8	54.1	1,665.2
Percentage possible sunshine	49	51	52	49	46	52	57	56	55	49	41	47	51
Source 1: NOAA
Source 2: MeteoSwiss (snow 1981–2010)
