= Trübtensee =

- Triebtenseewli
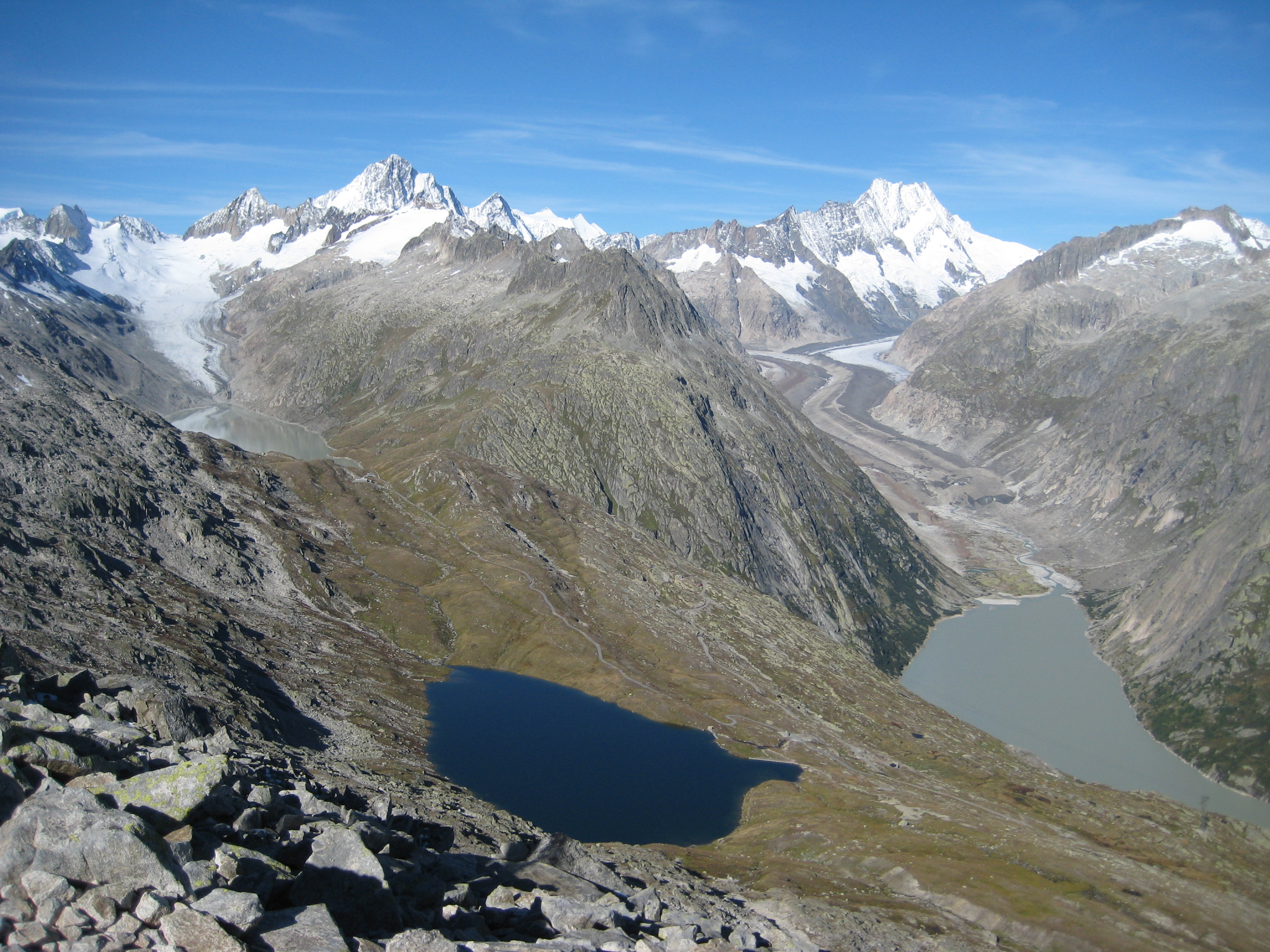

- Location within Canton of Bern Location within Switzerland Location within Alps
- Interactive map of Trübtensee
- Location: Guttannen, Bernese Oberland
- Coordinates: 46°33′10″N 8°17′53″E
- Type: reservoir
- Catchment area: 1.8 km^{2} (0.69 sq mi)
- Basin countries: Switzerland
- Max. length: 0.5 km (0.31 mi)
- Surface area: 0.1 km^{2} (0.039 sq mi)
- Water volume: 1.1 million cubic metres (890 acre⋅ft)
- Surface elevation: 2,385 m (7,825 ft)

Trübtensee or Triebtenseewli is a lake in the municipality of Guttannen, Bernese Oberland, Switzerland. The reservoir's surface area is 0.1 km^{2} (25 acres). Its dam was completed in the 1950s and holds a volume of 1.1 mio m³.
