= Obergesteln =

- Former municipality
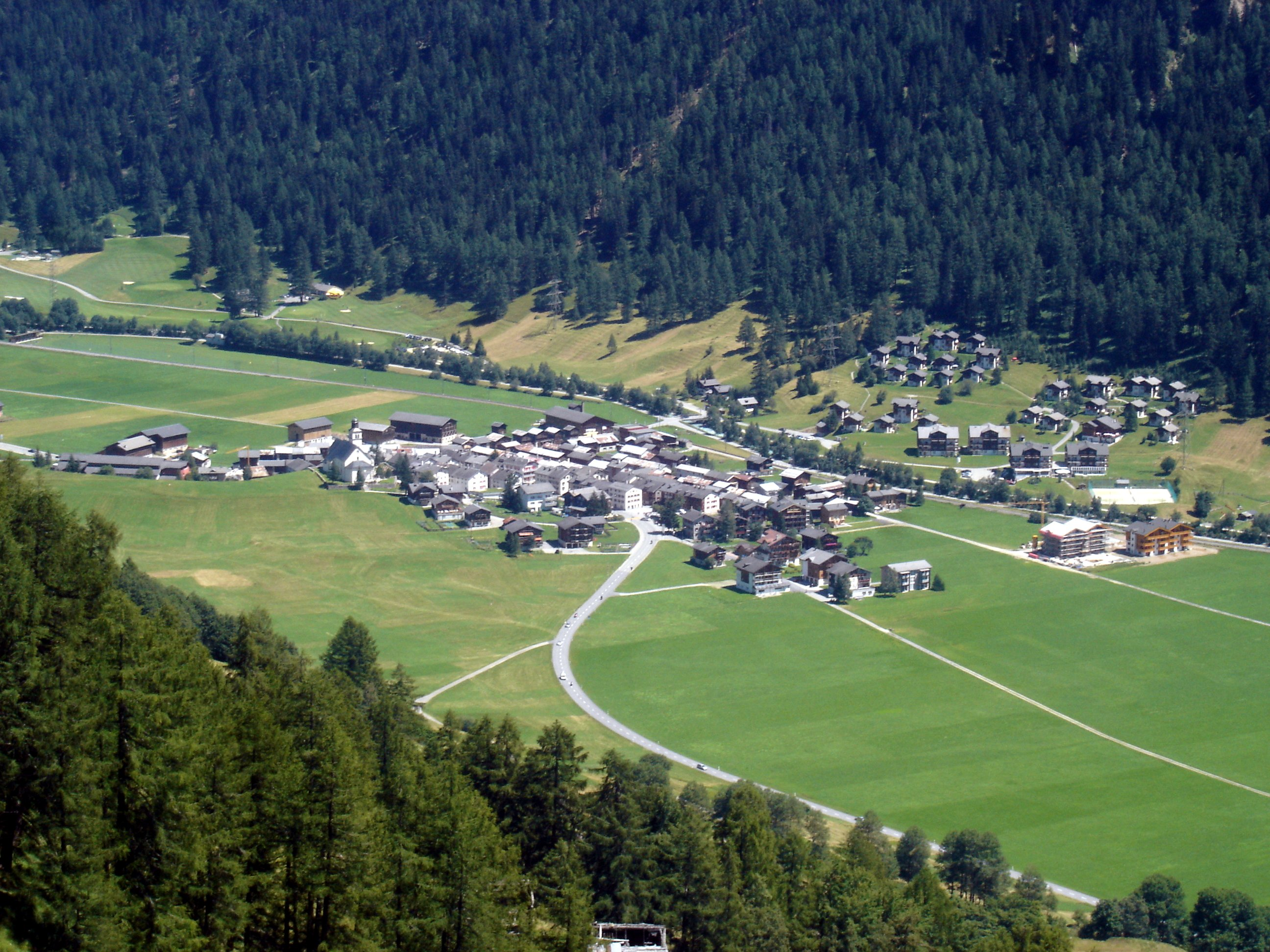

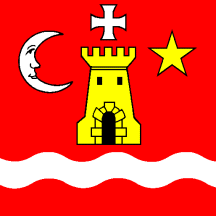
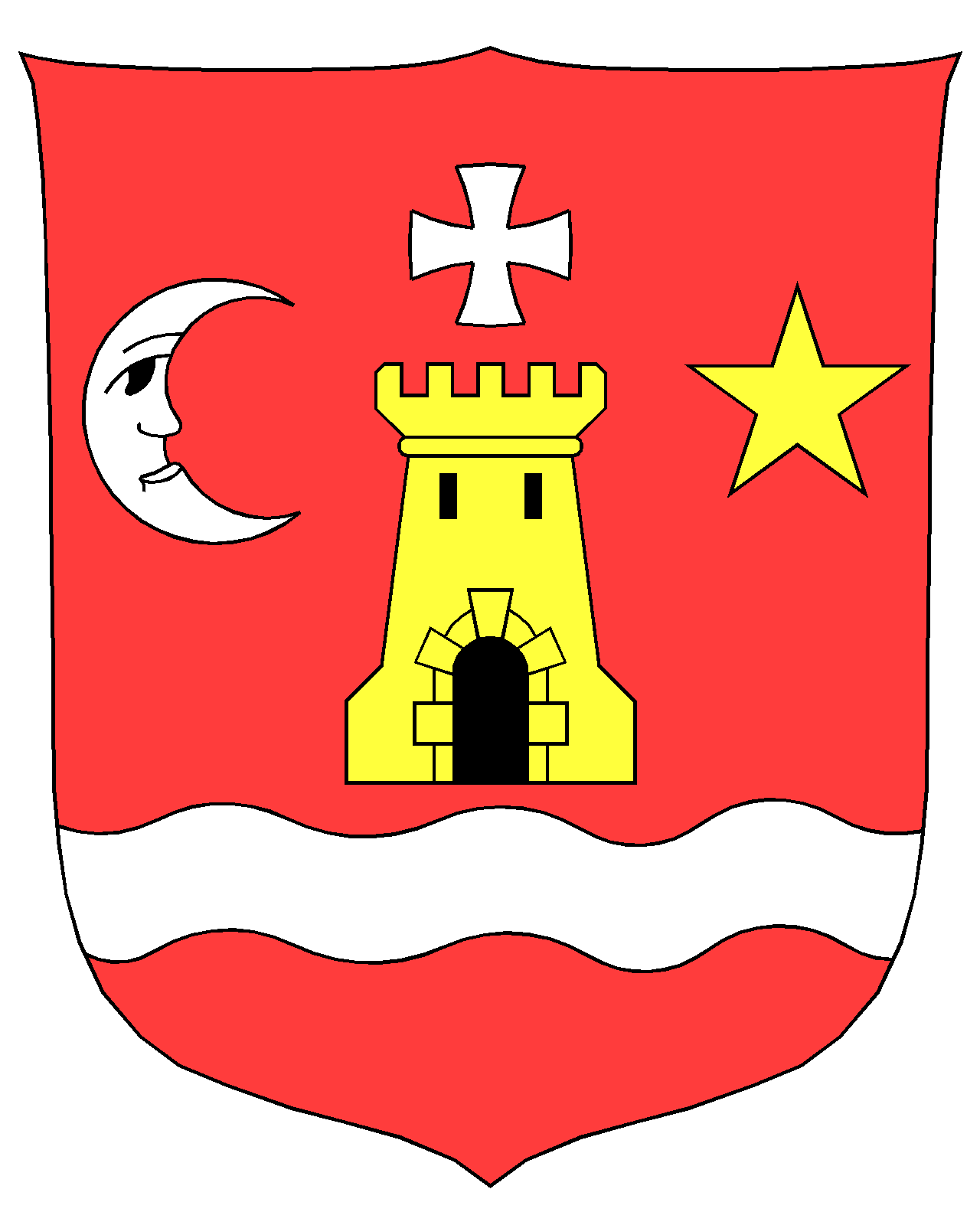
- Flag Coat of arms
- Location of Obergesteln
- Location within Switzerland Location within Canton of Valais
- Coordinates: 46°30′N 8°19′E
- Country: Switzerland
- Canton: Valais
- District: Goms
- Municipality: Obergoms

Area
  - Total: 14.6 km^{2} (5.6 sq mi)
- Elevation: 1,355 m (4,446 ft)

Population (December 2007)
  - Total: 209
  - Density: 14.3/km^{2} (37.1/sq mi)
- Time zone: UTC+01:00 (CET)
  - Summer (DST): UTC+02:00 (CEST)
- Postal code: 3988
- SFOS number: 6065
- ISO 3166 code: CH-VS
- Website: www.obergesteln.ch

Obergesteln is a village in the municipality of Obergoms in the district of Goms in the canton of Valais in Switzerland.

Obergesteln was an independent municipality until January 1, 2009, when it merged with Oberwald and Ulrichen to form the municipality Obergoms.

Aerial view (1949)
