= Sidelhorn =

Mountain in Switzerland

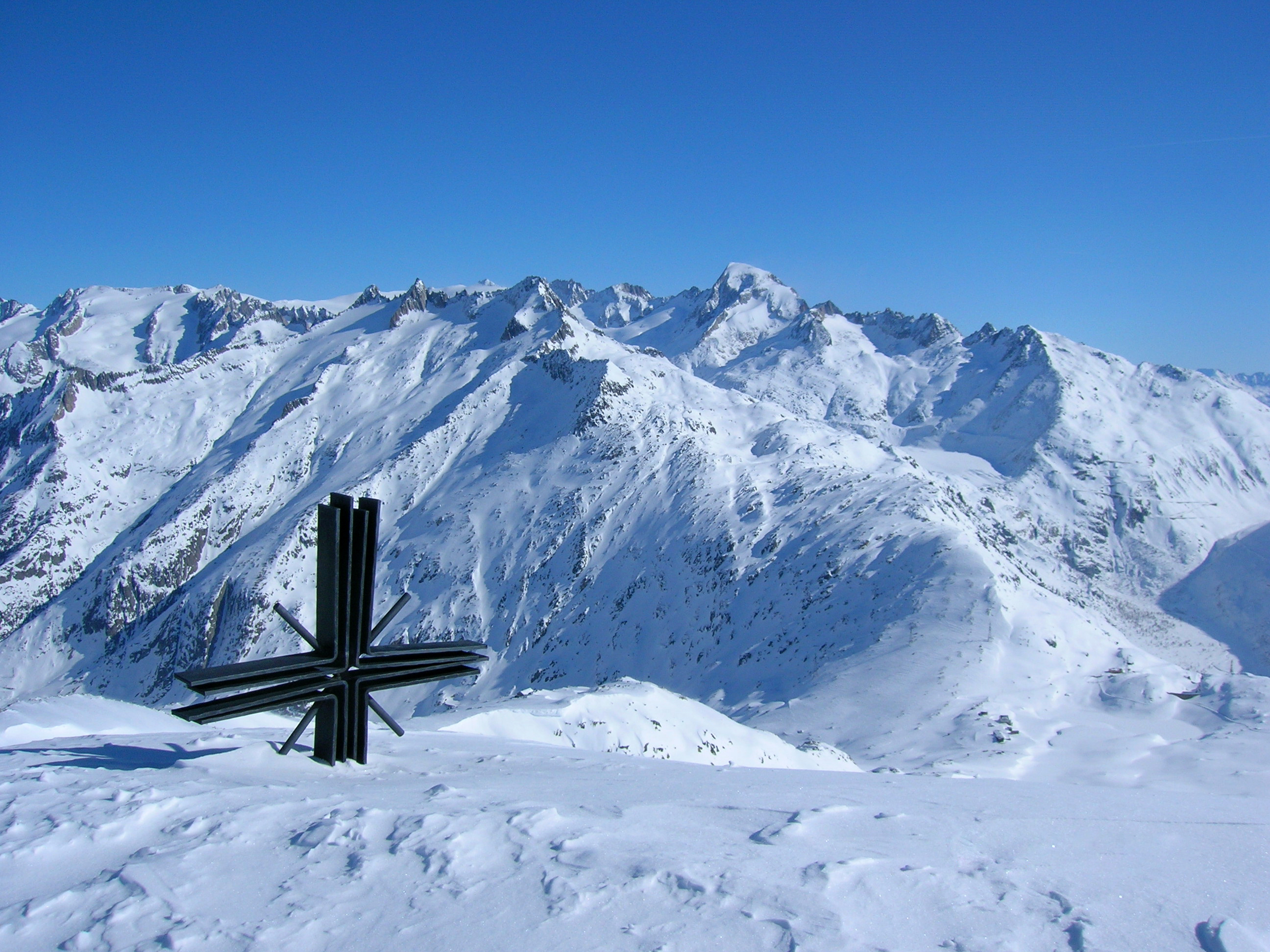
- View from the summit

Highest point
- Elevation: 2,764 m (9,068 ft)
- Prominence: 125 m (410 ft)
- Parent peak: Finsteraarhorn
- Coordinates: 46°33′8.6″N 8°18′45.7″E

Geography
- Location within Switzerland
- Location: Bern/Valais, Switzerland
- Parent range: Bernese Alps

The Sidelhorn is a mountain of the Bernese Alps, located west of the Grimsel Pass. It lies at the eastern end of the mountain chain between the Unteraar Glacier and the Rhone valley, named Aargrat. Because the glacier drains into the Aar and hence the Rhine and North Sea, whilst the Rhone flows into the Mediterranean Sea, the Sidelhorn lies on the European continental divide.

The summit can be reached by several trails from the Grimsel Pass.

Administratively, the mountain lies on the border between the municipality of Guttannen, to the north and in the canton of Bern, and the municipality of Obergoms, to the south and in the canton of Valais.
