= Rhône Glacier =

Glacier in the Swiss Alps

- German: Rhonegletscher, French: Glacier du Rhône, Italian: ghiacciaio del Rodano
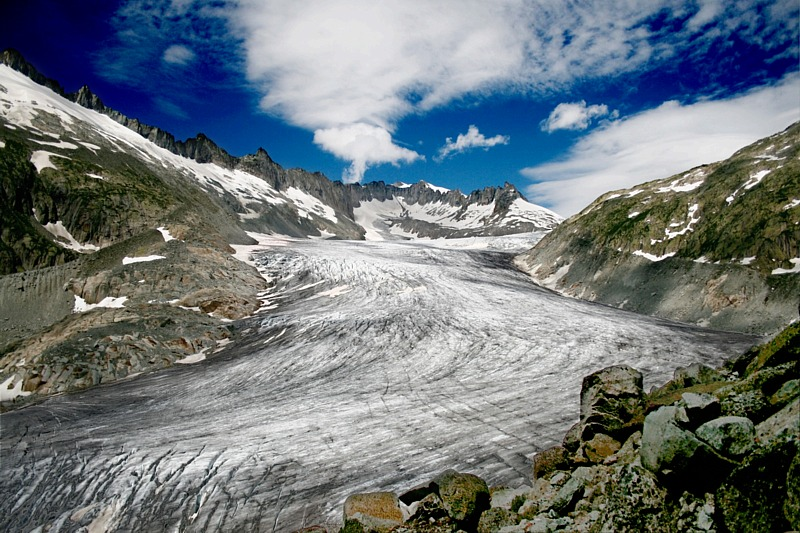
- View towards the Tieralplistock

- Location within Switzerland Location within Canton of Valais Location within Alps
- Interactive map of Rhône Glacier
- Type: Valley glacier
- Location: Furka Pass, Valais, Switzerland
- Coordinates: 46°34.32′N 8°22.58′E
- Area: 17.60 km^{2} (6.80 sq mi) (1973)
- Length: 9.09 km (5.65 mi) (1879), 8.00 km (4.97 mi) (1973), 7.65 km (4.75 mi) (2016)
- Highest elevation: 3,630 m (11,910 ft)
- Lowest elevation: 2,200 m (7,200 ft)
- Terminus: Rotten (local name for Rhône) above Gletsch
- Status: Retreating

The Rhône Glacier (German: Rhonegletscher, Walliser German: Rottengletscher, French: glacier du Rhône, Italian: ghiacciaio del Rodano) is a glacier in the Swiss Alps and the source of the river Rhône and one of the primary contributors to Lake Geneva in the far eastern end of the Swiss canton of Valais. While the glacier is accessible via the Furka Pass road, it can only be visited between the summer solstice and the autumnal equinox (roughly 120 days a year).

== Geography ==
The Rhône Glacier is the largest glacier in the Urner Alps. It lies on the south side of the range at the source of the Rhône. The Undri Triftlimi (3,081 m, 10,108 ft) connects it to the Trift Glacier. The glacier is located on the northernmost part of the canton of Valais, between the Grimsel Pass and the Furka Pass and is part of the Oberwald municipality. The Dammastock (3,630 m, 11,910 ft) is the highest summit above the glacier.

== Evolution ==
In recent years, the Rhône Glacier has become a prominent example of Alpine glacier retreat. According to a 2025 report by Swissinfo, since 1850, the glacier has lost about 60% of its volume. Between 2023 and 2024, the melt rate was recorded at 2.5%, exceeding the average of the previous decade.

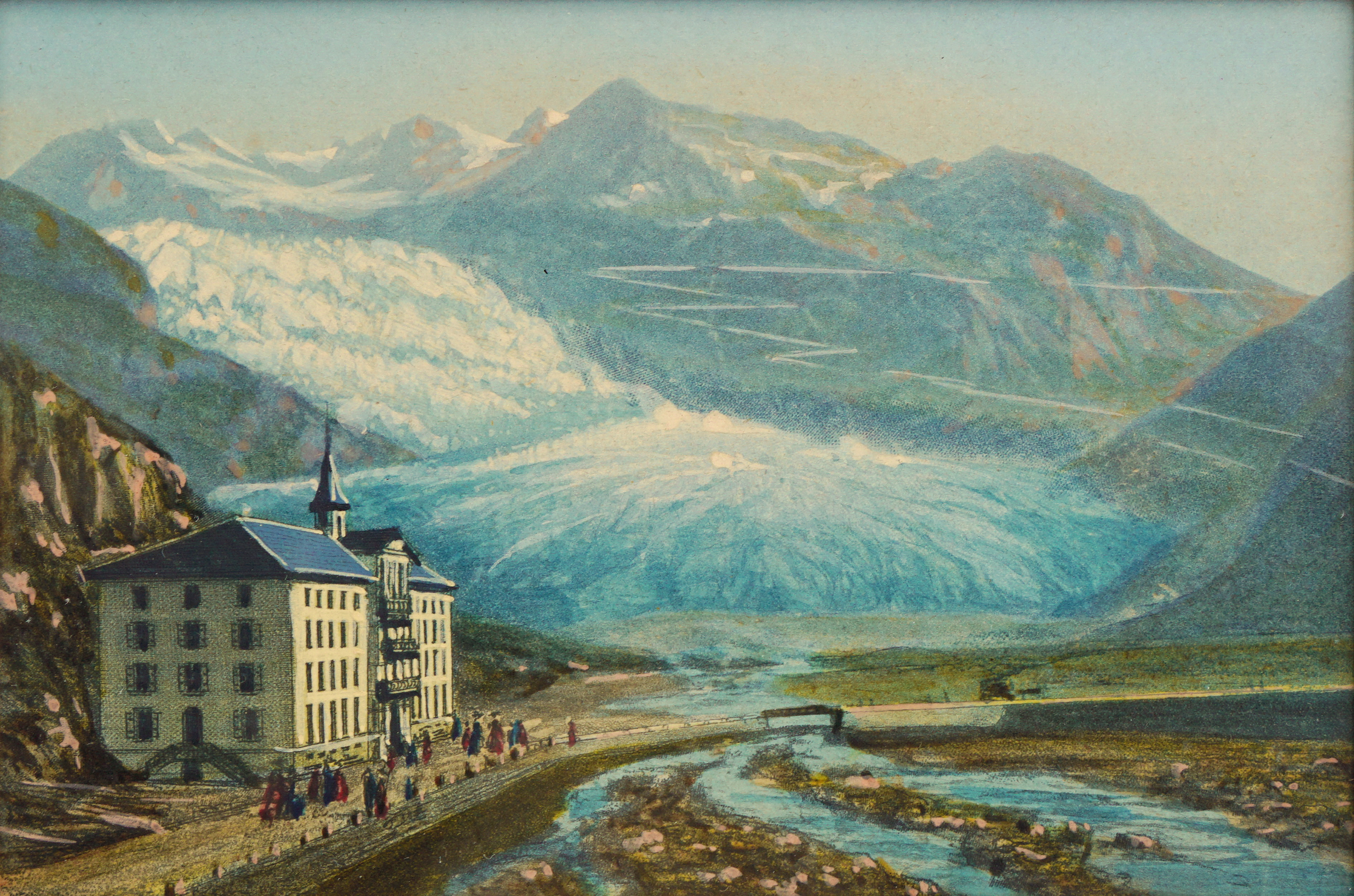
1870

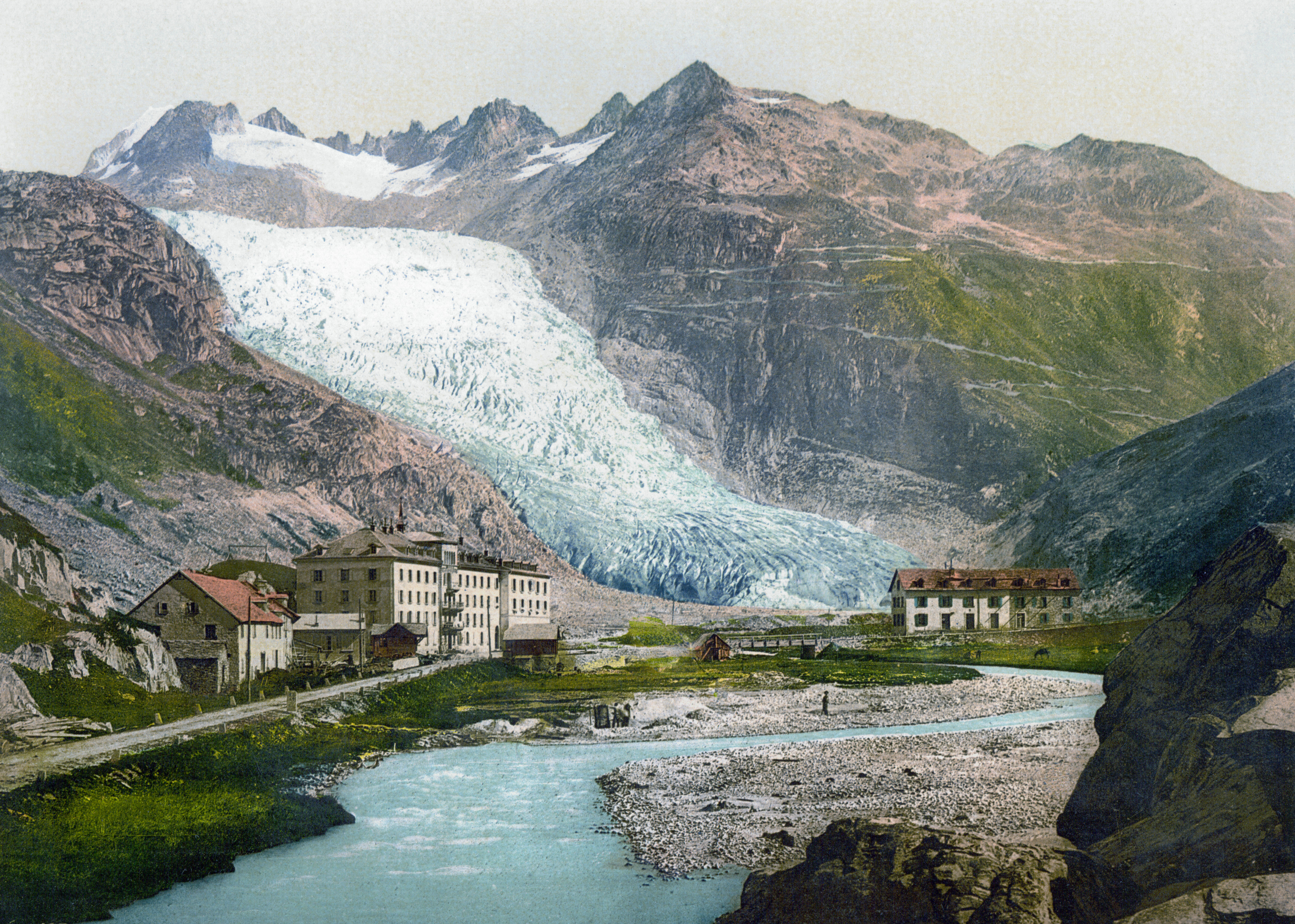
1900

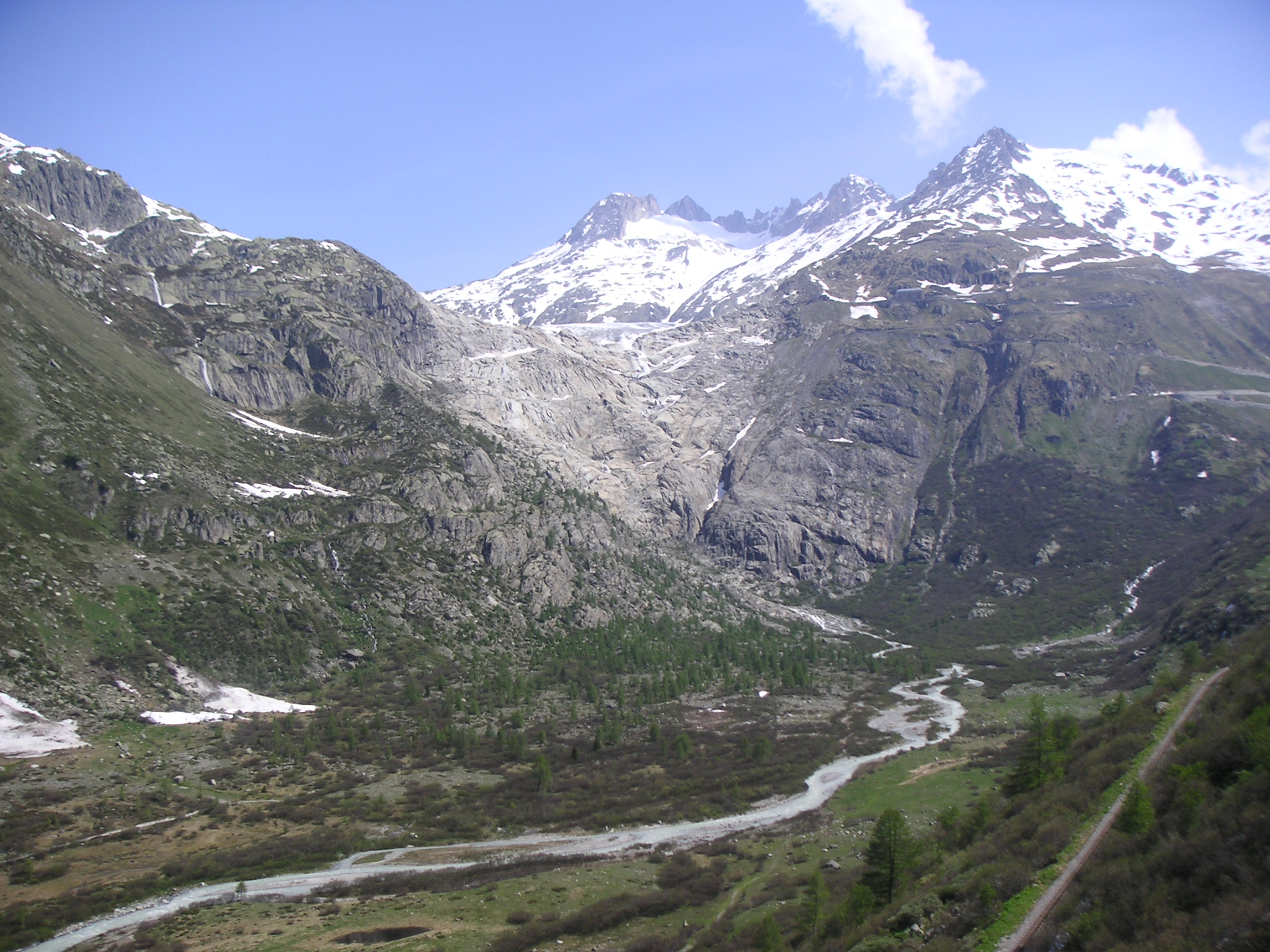
2005

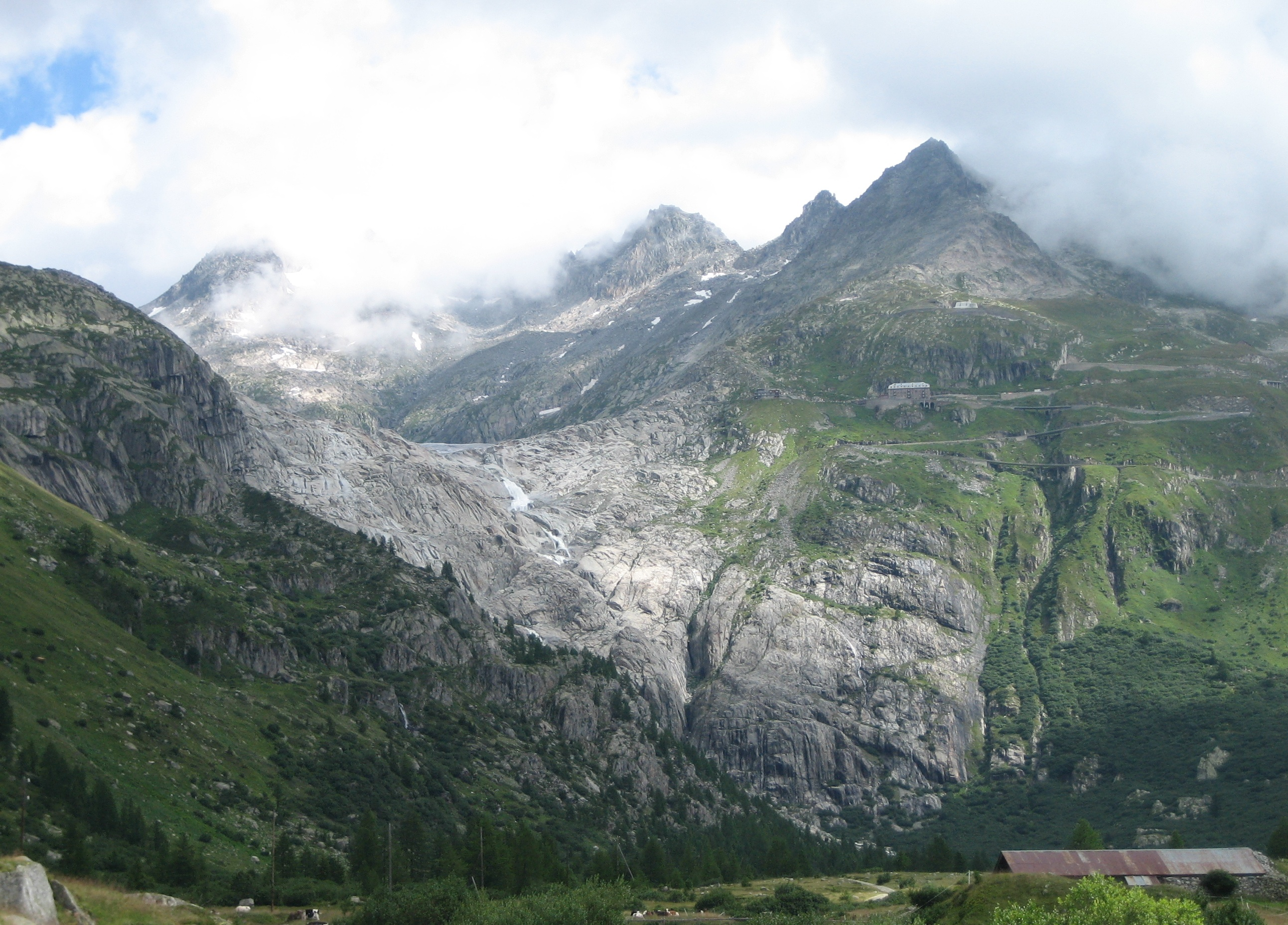
2008

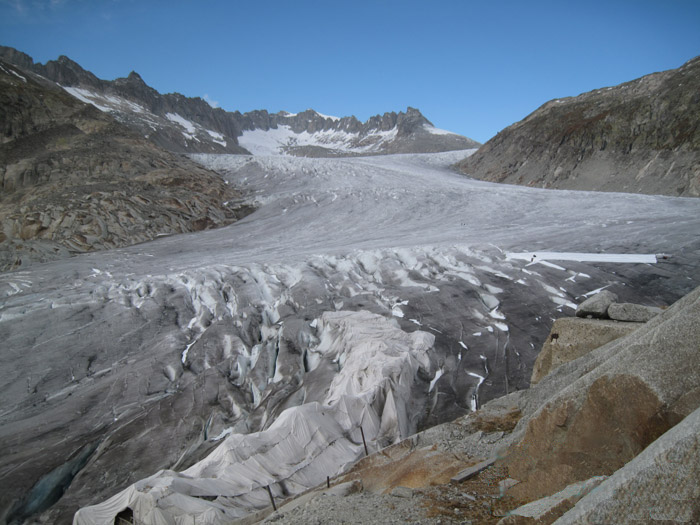
2010

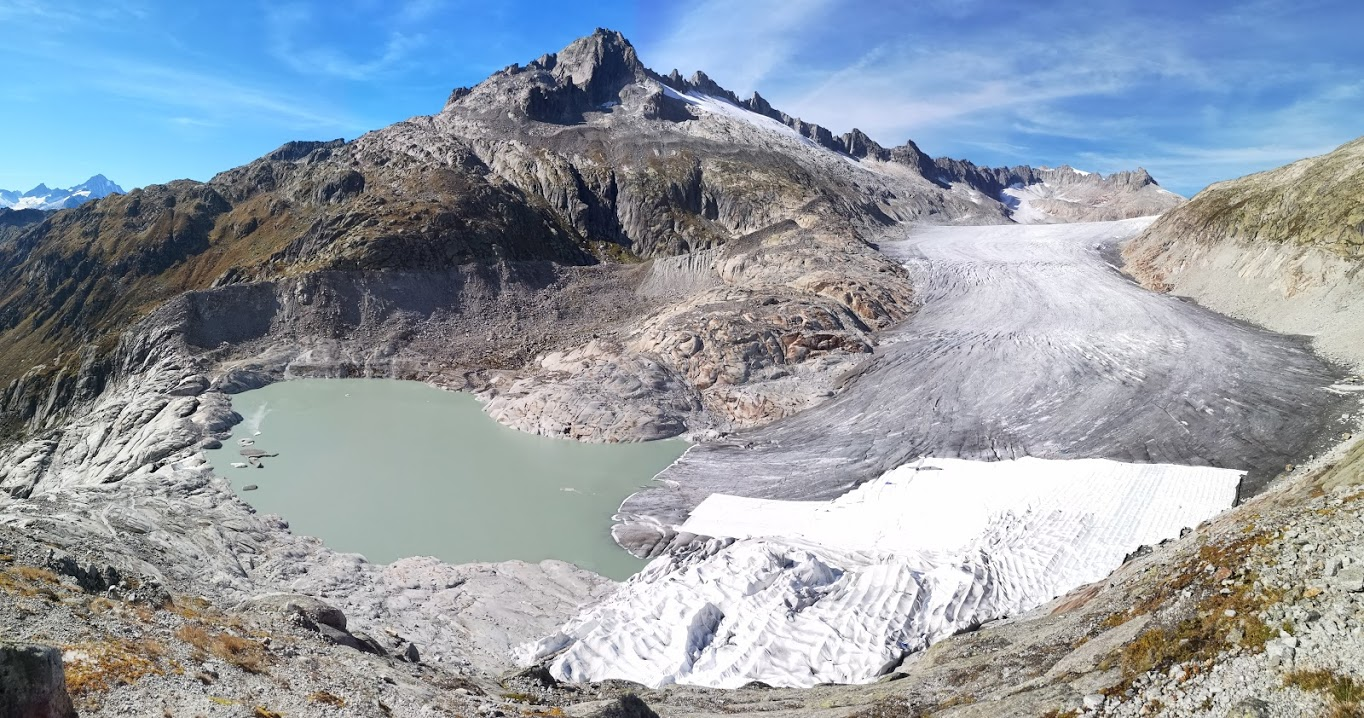
2018

2021

Evolution of The Rhône Glacier. Vertical axis: length difference in meters Horizontal axis: years In thick green: cumulated length difference starting 1879 In thin red: growth during one year

Because of its easy accessibility the evolution of the Rhône Glacier has been observed since the 19th century. During the last 120 years, the glacier has retreated approximately 1,300 m (4,300 ft), leaving behind a track of naked stone.

== Slowing the retreat ==
For several years, UV-resistant fleecy white blankets have been installed during the warm periods, covering about 2 hectares (5 acres) of the retreating glacier to reduce its melting. It is estimated that this effort reduces the melting by up to 70%. In addition to the global implications of increasing climate warming and instability, the local economy is at risk of losing business income from glacier tourists who have flocked to the area since 1870 to walk through "a long and winding ice grotto with glistening blue walls and a leaky ceiling". In 2018, photographers Simon Norfolk and Klaus Thymann created a series of photographs titled "Shroud" displaying the wrapped glacier for the charity organisation Project Pressure to draw attention to the glacial retreat. Of particular concern in recent studies has been the loss of not only ice but of biological heritage in the form of microrganisms contained within the ice and soil.

== See also ==
- List of glaciers in Switzerland
- List of glaciers
- Retreat of glaciers since 1850
- Swiss Alps
