= Furka Pass =

Mountain pass in the Swiss Alps

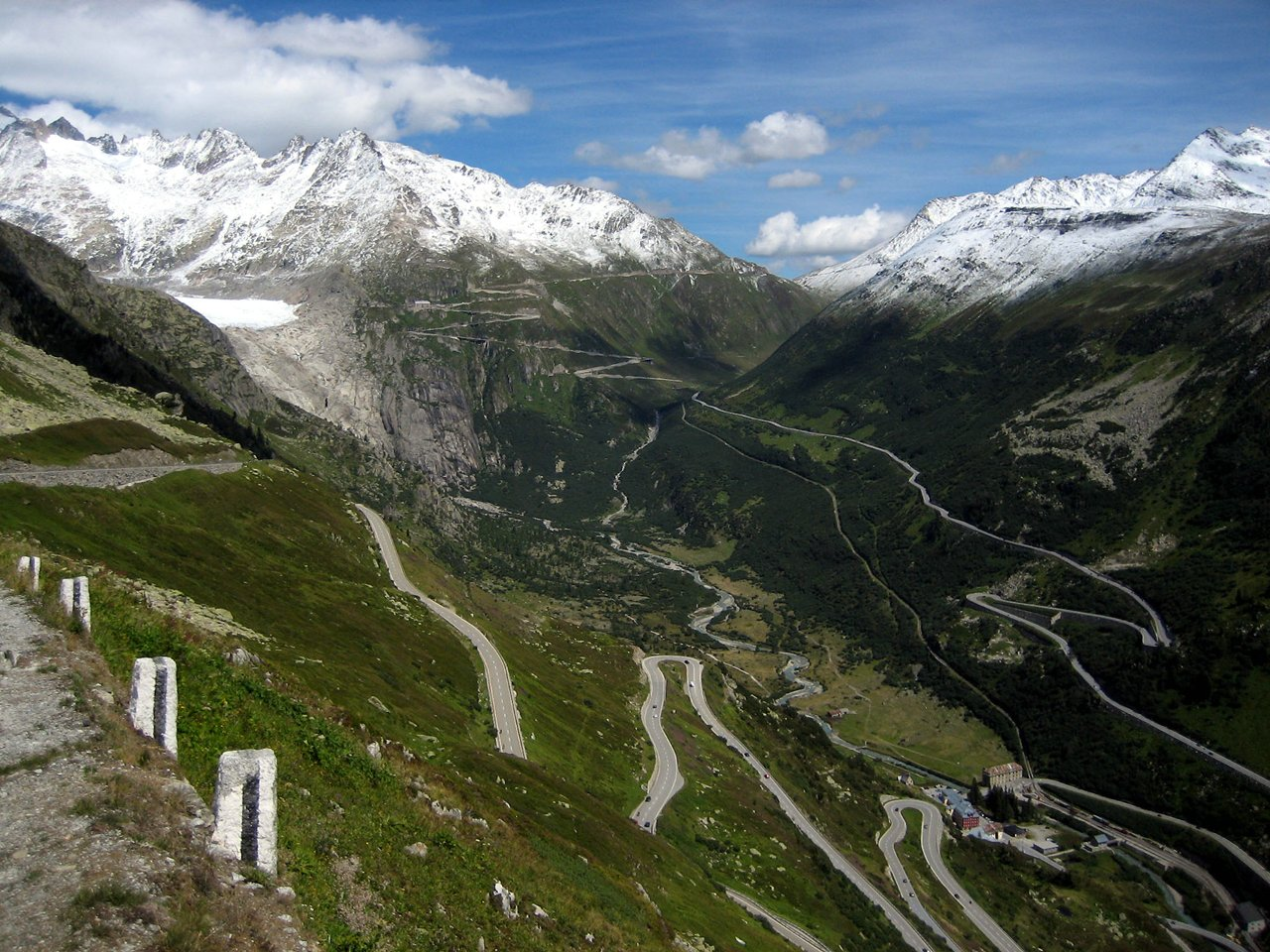
- Furkapass and hairpins of the Furkapassroute in Switzerland as seen from Grimselpassroute

- Location within Switzerland
- Elevation: 2,429 m (7,969 ft)
- Traversed by: Road 19

Third Approach
- Location: Uri/Valais, Switzerland
- Range: Alps
- Coordinates: 46°34′21″N 08°24′54″E

Furka Pass (German: Furkapass; French: Col de la Furka) is a 2,429 m (7,969 ft) high mountain pass in the southern Swiss Alps connecting Gletsch, Valais with Realp, Uri via the seasonal Furkapassroute. The Furka Oberalp Bahn bypasses the pass through the 1,390 m (4,560 ft) high Furka Base Tunnel, which opened in 1982 to replace the seasonal Furka Summit Tunnel at 2,160 metres (7,090 ft).

The Furka Pass was used as a location in the James Bond film Goldfinger, a curve of which is marked as "James Bond Strasse", complete with lookout point and small parking area. Near the western summit of the pass is the Hotel Belvédère; a short walk from it leads to the Rhône Glacier Ice Grotto. The glacier moves 30–40 metres a year, and the 100 metre long tunnel and ice chamber have to be recarved every year.

== Panorama ==
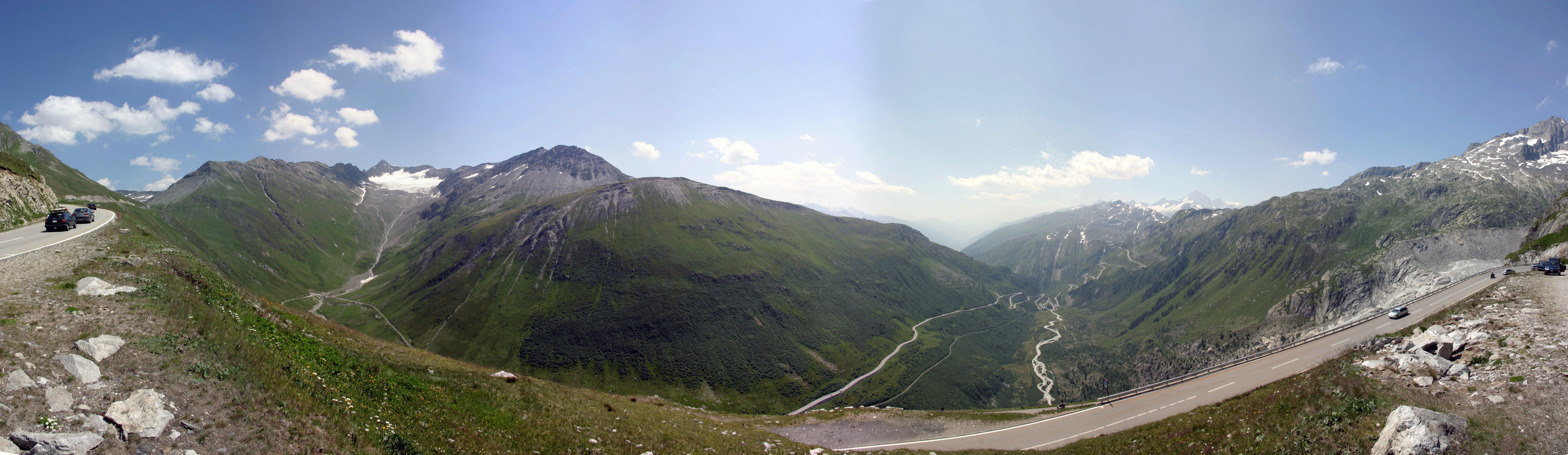

== Gallery ==
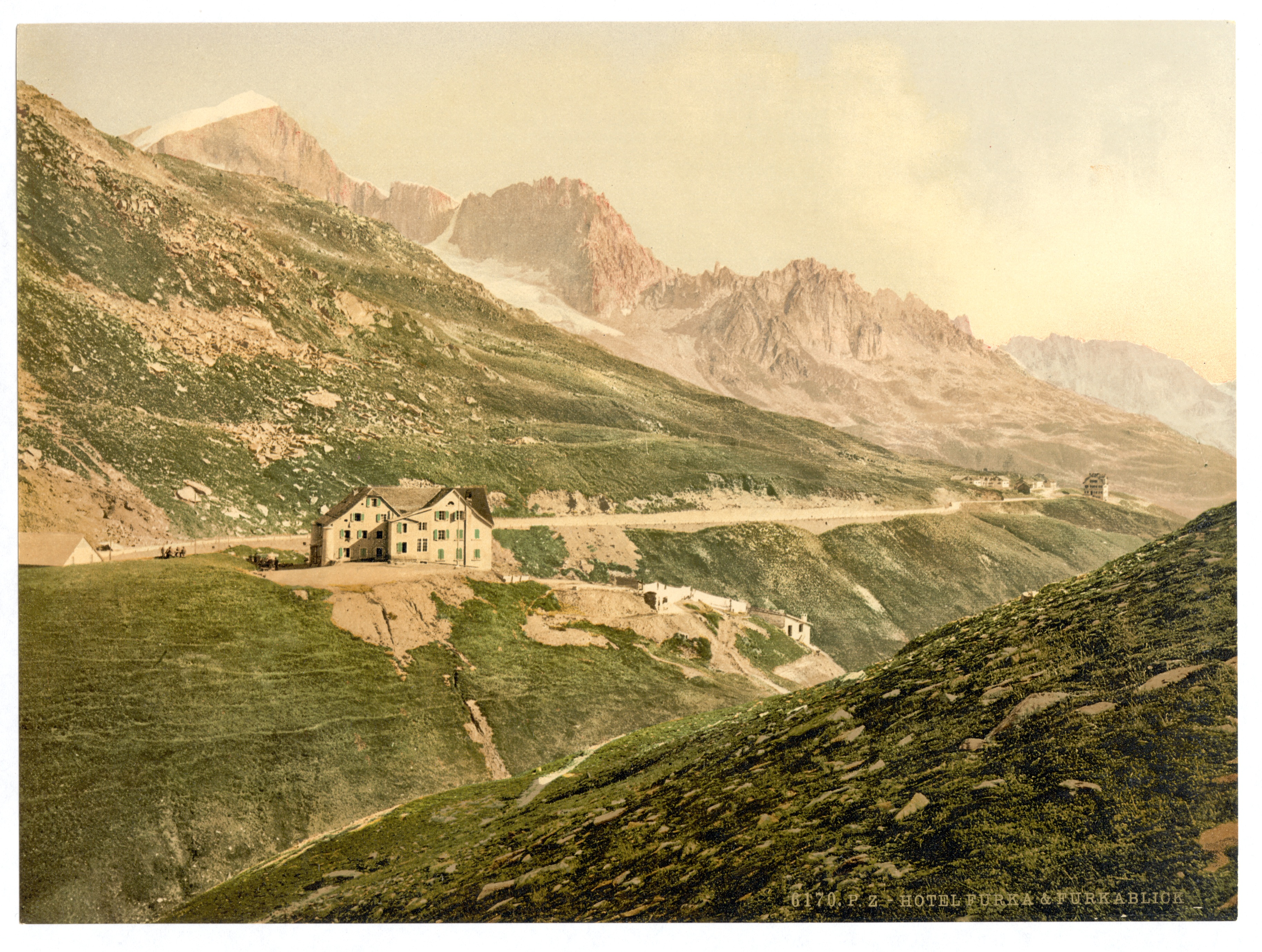
Furka Pass, 1890

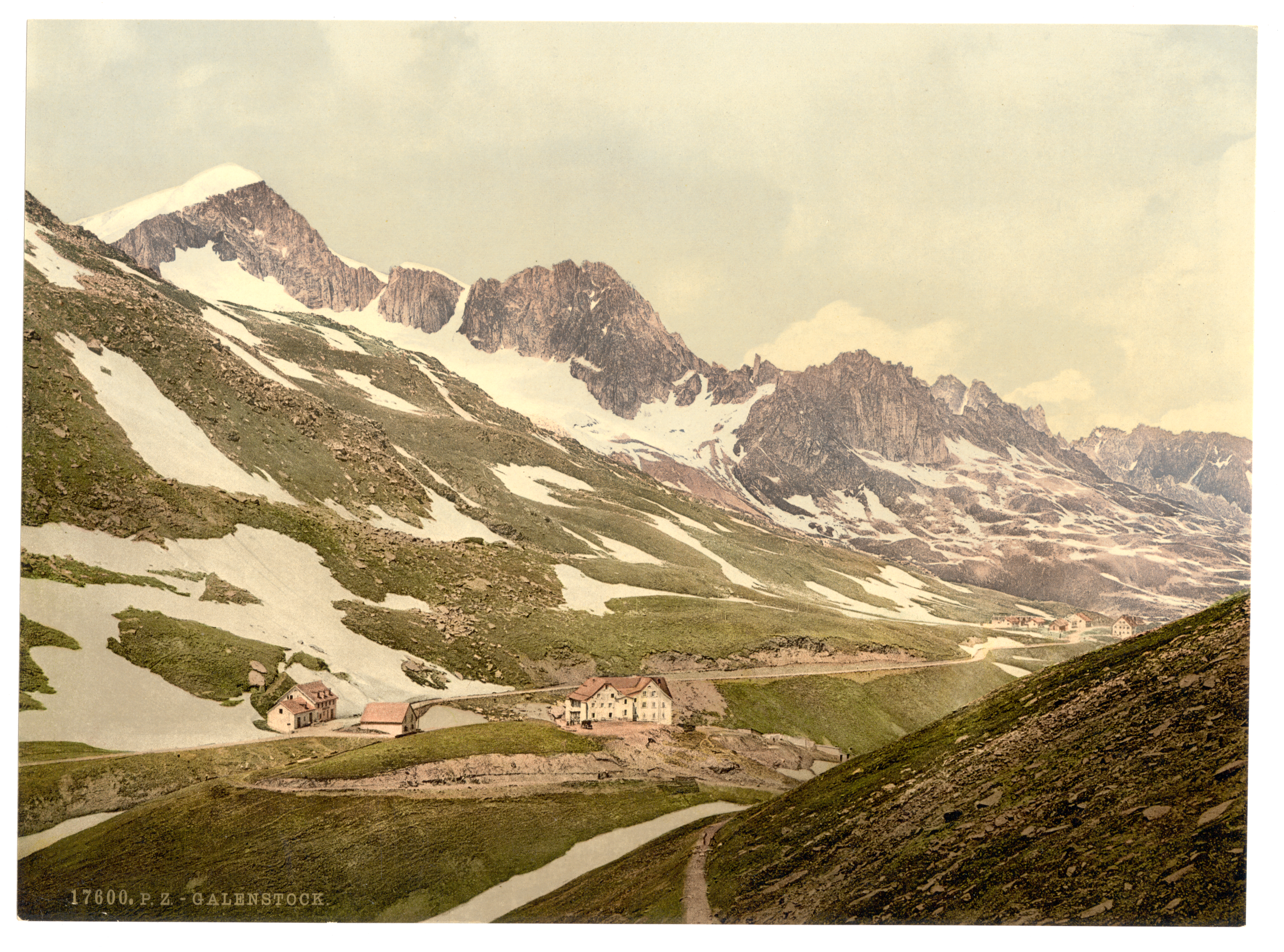
Furka Pass, Galenstock, general view

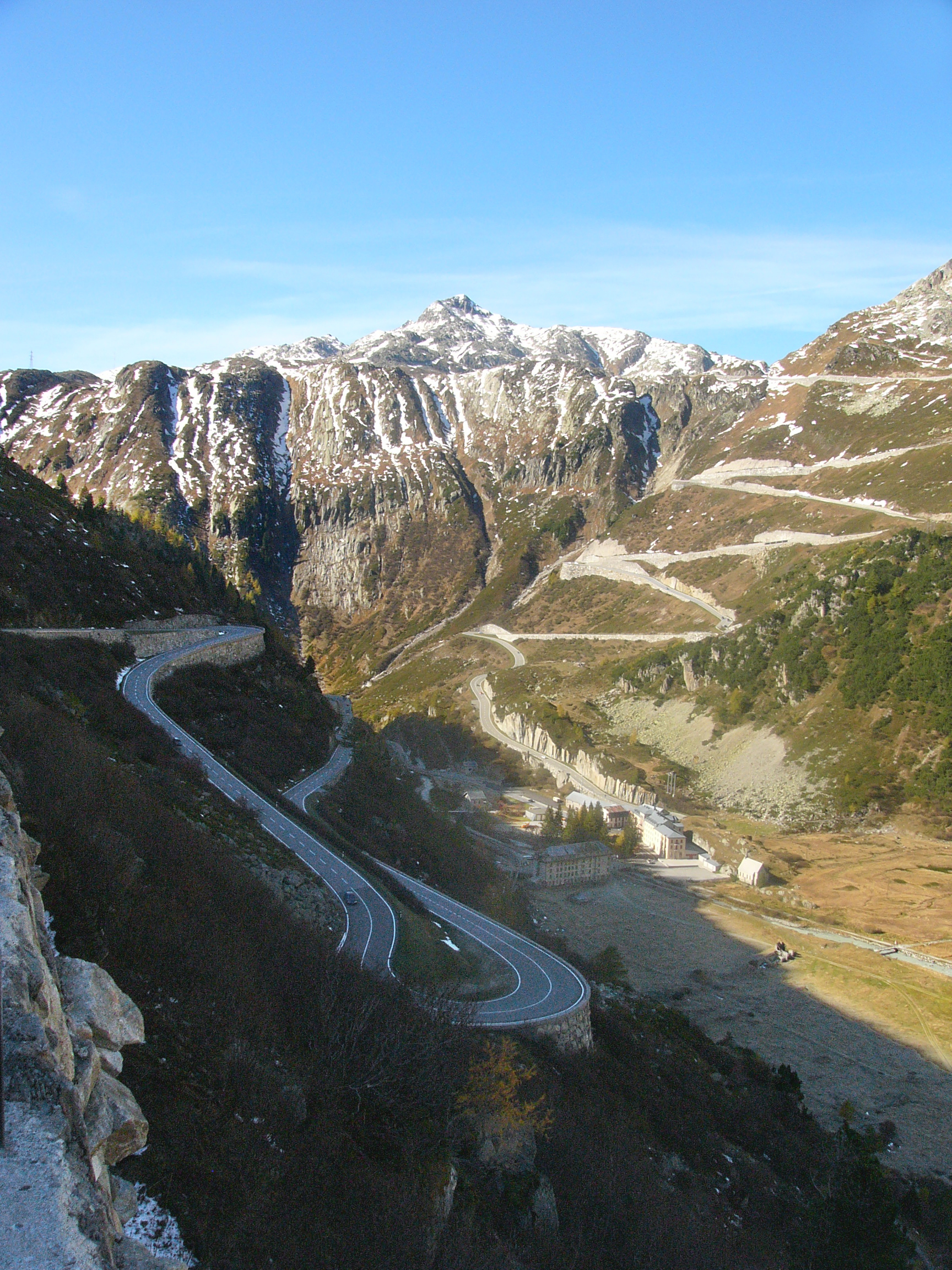
Furkapass

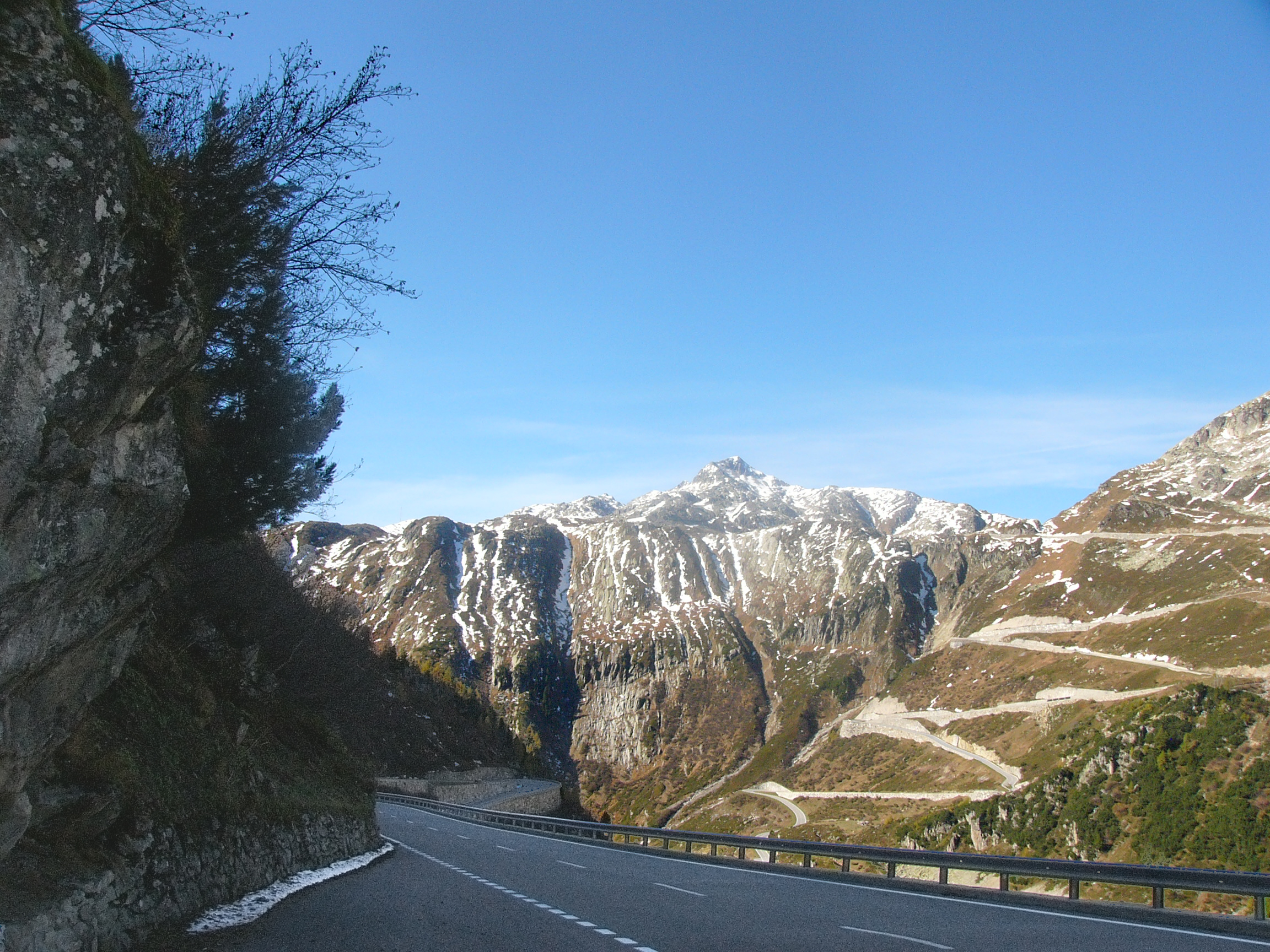
Furkapass, road

== See also ==
- List of highest paved roads in Europe
- List of mountain passes
- List of the highest Swiss passes
