= Ambrì =

- Village
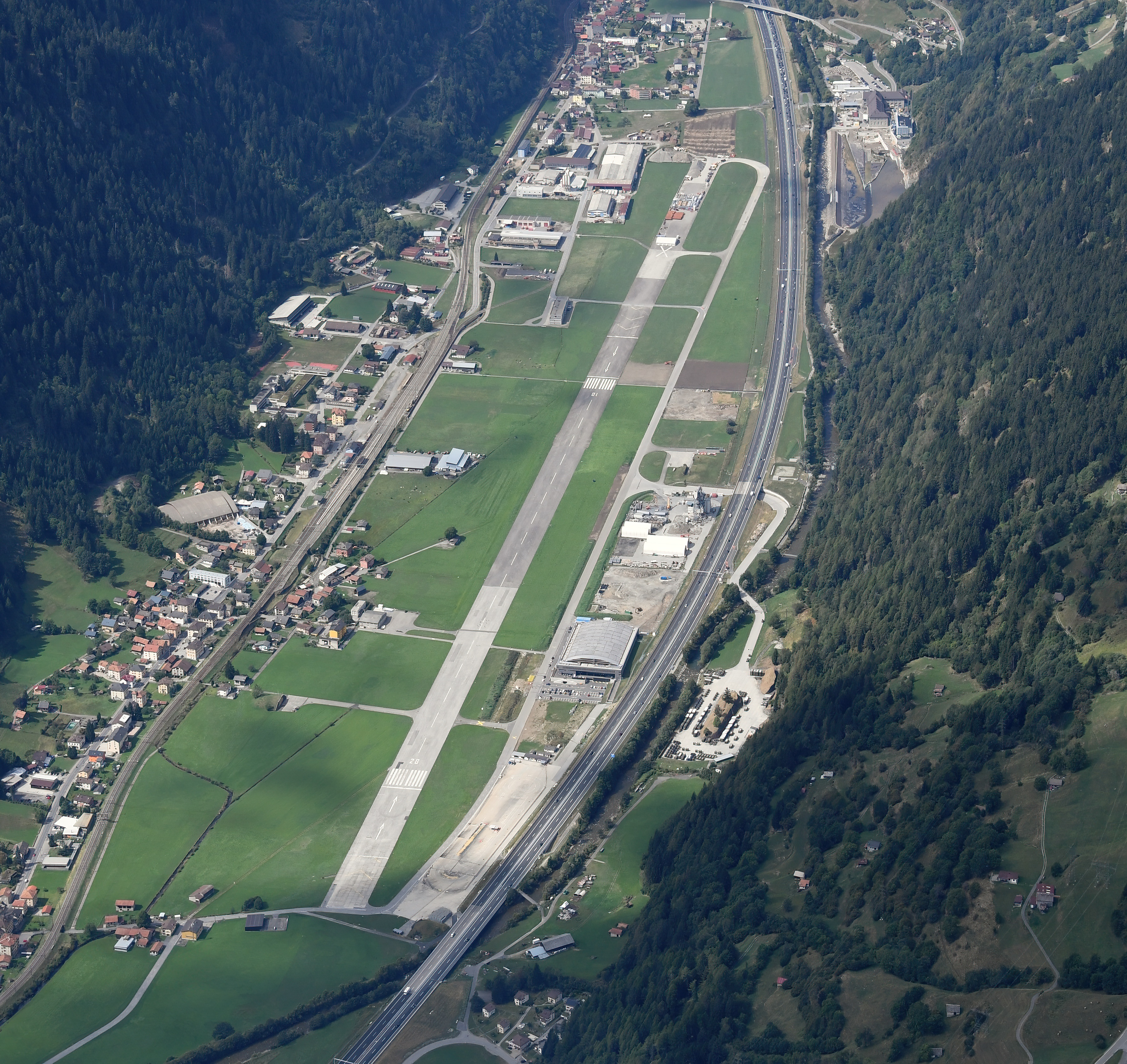
- The airport and the village of Ambrì

- Position in Switzerland
- Coordinates: 46°30′40″N 8°42′2″E
- Country: Switzerland
- Canton: Ticino
- District: Leventina
- Municipality: Quinto
- Elevation: 1,003 m (3,291 ft)
- Time zone: UTC+01:00 (CET)
  - Summer (DST): UTC+02:00 (CEST)
- Postal code: 6775
- Area code: (+41) 091
- Licence plate: TI

Ambrì is a Swiss village in the municipality of Quinto, Leventina District, Canton of Ticino.

== Geography ==
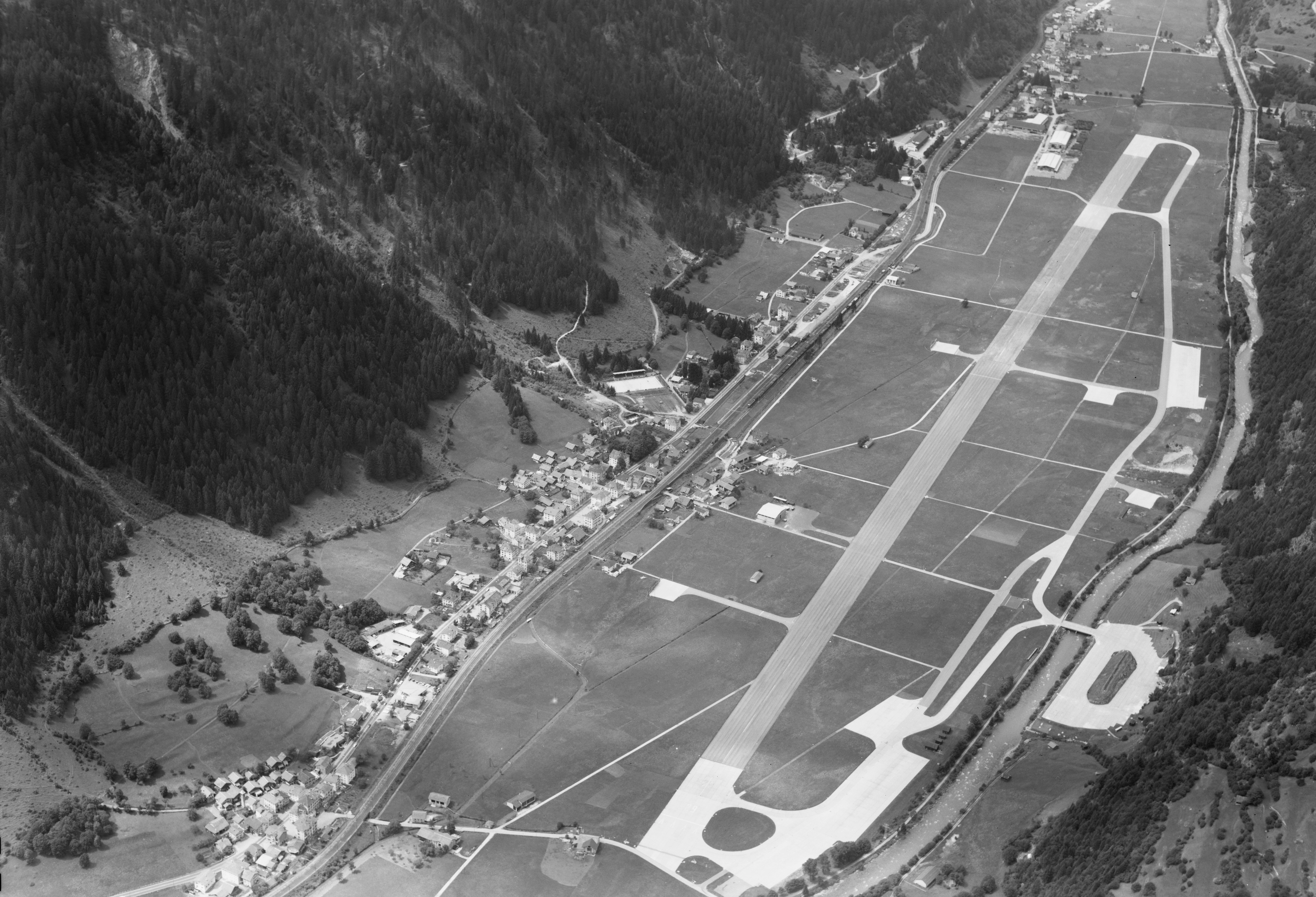
Aerial view (1965)

Ambrì is located in the Leventina Valley, upon the southwestern shore of Ticino river and below the Lepontine Alps, next to the neighboring village of Piotta. Other villages close to Ambrì are Rodi and Fiesso. It is 2 km far from Quinto, 7 from Airolo and 50 from Bellinzona.

== Sports ==
The village is known throughout Switzerland for being home to National League (NL) team HC Ambrì-Piotta, that plays in the 6,500-seat Valascia, but is set to move into a new arena by 2021.

Ambrì is also a popular area for hiking.

== Transport ==
Ambrì also has its own airport, Ambrì Airport. The airport was a military one until 1994. Now it hosts events, flight school and more. But sometimes also domestic passenger flights.

Ambrì is served with hourly connections by Ambrì-Piotta station, on the Gotthard railway.

== Weather ==
Climate data for Quinto/Piotta/Ambri
Month	Jan	Feb	Mar	Apr	May	Jun	Jul	Aug	Sep	Oct	Nov	Dec	Year
Mean daily maximum °C (°F)	1.9 (35.4)	3.7 (38.7)	6.9 (44.4)	10.3 (50.5)	15.3 (59.5)	19.5 (67.1)	22.2 (72.0)	21.1 (70.0)	17.9 (64.2)	13 (55)	5.8 (42.4)	2.5 (36.5)	11.7 (53.1)
Daily mean °C (°F)	−1.5 (29.3)	−0.3 (31.5)	2.6 (36.7)	6.1 (43.0)	10.3 (50.5)	14 (57)	16.6 (61.9)	15.5 (59.9)	12.5 (54.5)	8 (46)	2.6 (36.7)	−0.4 (31.3)	7.2 (45.0)
Mean daily minimum °C (°F)	−4.8 (23.4)	−3.8 (25.2)	−1.2 (29.8)	2.1 (35.8)	6 (43)	9.1 (48.4)	11.4 (52.5)	11 (52)	8.5 (47.3)	4.4 (39.9)	−0.6 (30.9)	−3.6 (25.5)	3.2 (37.8)
Average precipitation mm (inches)	76 (3.0)	83 (3.3)	96 (3.8)	132 (5.2)	161 (6.3)	121 (4.8)	114 (4.5)	141 (5.6)	139 (5.5)	146 (5.7)	133 (5.2)	70 (2.8)	1,413 (55.6)
Average precipitation days	7.9	7.7	9.1	10	12.6	11	9.8	10.6	7.9	8.4	9.1	8.2	112.3
Source: MeteoSchweiz

== See also ==
- Lago Ritom
- Ritom funicular
