= 2013 Tour de Suisse =

2013 UCI World Tour, race 17 of 28

Race details
- Dates: 8–16 June 2013
- Stages: 9
- Distance: 1,284.2 km (798.0 mi)
- Winning time: 31h 08' 11"

Results
Jersey awarded to the overall winner	Winner	Rui Costa (Portugal)	(Movistar Team)
	Second	Bauke Mollema (Netherlands)	(Blanco Pro Cycling)
	Third	Roman Kreuziger (Czech Republic)	(Saxo–Tinkoff)
Jersey awarded to the points classification winner	Points	Peter Sagan (Slovakia)	(Cannondale)
Jersey awarded to the mountains classification winner	Mountains	Robert Vrečer (Slovenia)	(Euskaltel–Euskadi)
Jersey awarded to the sprints classification winner	Sprints	Robert Vrečer (Slovenia)	(Euskaltel–Euskadi)
	Team	Astana	

The 2013 Tour de Suisse was the 77th running of the Tour de Suisse cycling stage race. It started on 8 June with an individual time trial in Quinto and ended on 16 June after another individual time trial in Flumserberg; in total, the race consisted of nine stages. It was the seventeenth race of the 2013 UCI World Tour season.

The race was won for the second successive year by Movistar Team rider Rui Costa, who claimed the leader's yellow jersey after winning the final stage – a time trial, with a 10 km (6.2 mi) climb to a summit finish – overturning a 13-second deficit to previous race leader Mathias Frank of the BMC Racing Team. Costa was also the winner of the race's queen stage two days prior, winning into La Punt. Costa's winning margin over runner-up Bauke Mollema of Blanco Pro Cycling – a stage winner during the race, winning the second stage – was sixty-two seconds, while the podium was completed by Saxo–Tinkoff's Roman Kreuziger, eight seconds down on Mollema and seventy behind Costa.

In the race's other classifications, Euskaltel–Euskadi rider Robert Vrečer was the winner of both the mountains and the sprints classifications, having featured in several breakaways during the nine-day race. Peter Sagan (Cannondale) again won the points classification, and was the only other rider to win multiple stages during the event. Astana finished at the head of the teams classification, for the second successive year.

== Teams ==
As the Tour de Suisse was a UCI World Tour event, all UCI ProTeams were invited automatically and obligated to send a squad. Originally, eighteen ProTeams were scheduled to be invited to the race, with two other squads – IAM Cycling, and Sojasun – given wildcard places, and as such, would have formed the event's 20-team peloton. Team Katusha subsequently regained their ProTour status after an appeal to the Court of Arbitration for Sport. With Team Katusha not originally invited to the race, race organisers announced their inclusion to the race, bringing the total number of teams competing to twenty-one.

The 21 teams that competed in the race were:

- Ag2r–La Mondiale
- Argos–Shimano
- Astana
- Blanco Pro Cycling
- BMC Racing Team
- Cannondale
- Euskaltel–Euskadi
- FDJ
- Garmin–Sharp
- IAM Cycling
- Team Katusha
- Lampre–Merida
- Lotto–Belisol
- Movistar Team
- Omega Pharma–Quick-Step
- Orica–GreenEDGE
- RadioShack–Leopard
- Saxo–Tinkoff
- Sojasun
- Team Sky
- Vacansoleil–DCM

Among the 167-rider starting peloton – each team entered eight riders with the exception of Vacansoleil–DCM, who entered seven – were four previous winners of the race. 2008 winner Roman Kreuziger was the designated team leader for Saxo–Tinkoff, while 2009 winner Fabian Cancellara occupied a similar role for RadioShack–Leopard. The Movistar Team had two previous riders among their octet; Vladimir Karpets, who won the race in 2007, served as one of the domestiques for the defending race-winner Rui Costa.

== Race overview ==
Stage characteristics and winners
Stage	Date	Course	Distance	Type	Winner
1	8 June	Quinto to Quinto	8.1 km (5.0 mi)	Individual time trial	Cameron Meyer (AUS)
2	9 June	Ulrichen to Crans-Montana	117.2 km (72.8 mi)	Mountain stage	Bauke Mollema (NED)
3	10 June	Montreux to Meiringen	204.9 km (127.3 mi)	Intermediate stage	Peter Sagan (SVK)
4	11 June	Innertkirchen to Buochs	174.4 km (108.4 mi)	Flat stage	Arnaud Démare (FRA)
5	12 June	Buochs to Leuggern	178.4 km (110.9 mi)	Hilly stage	Alexander Kristoff (NOR)
6	13 June	Leuggern to Meilen	187.9 km (116.8 mi)	Hilly stage	Grégory Rast (SUI)
7	14 June	Meilen to La Punt	206 km (128.0 mi)	Mountain stage	Rui Costa (POR)
8	15 June	Zernez to Bad Ragaz	180.5 km (112.2 mi)	Hilly stage	Peter Sagan (SVK)
9	16 June	Bad Ragaz to Flumserberg	26.8 km (16.7 mi)	Individual time trial	Rui Costa (POR)

== Stages ==
=== Stage 1 ===
8 June 2013 — Quinto, 8.1 km (5.0 mi), individual time trial (ITT)

After three years of opening with an individual time trial stage around the city of Lugano, the municipality of Quinto played host to the opening salvo of the 2013 edition of the Tour de Suisse. Starting and finishing at Ambri Airport, the 8.1 km (5.0 mi) parcours was set to favour the time trial specialists more so than the 2012 race-opening stage, with slightly less undulation on the route; the only major spike of note on the route – the route was compact, with no more than 100 metres (330 ft) of undulating parcours – was a 300 metres (980 ft) climb of 7% with around 2 km (1.2 mi) remaining of the stage. From the climb, the route descended back down towards the airport, with a run-in including a finishing straight of 300 metres (980 ft). Race organisers expected the best time for the stage to be beneath the ten-minute barrier, with a time of 9' 55".

Sojasun rider Yannick Talabardon was the first rider into the stage, and he recorded a time of 10' 32", which was instantaneously beaten by the next rider on the road, Reto Hollenstein of the IAM Cycling team; Hollenstein recorded a time exactly equal to the organisers' predicted winning time of 9' 55". However, Hollenstein was not to win with such a time, as after half an hour with the best time, Alex Rasmussen (Garmin–Sharp) knocked a second off the best time. Rasmussen held the fastest time for around fifteen minutes until Cameron Meyer comfortably beat that time for Orica–GreenEDGE. Although not the fastest through the intermediate time-check, Meyer crossed the line in a time of 9' 39", beating Rasmussen's time by fifteen seconds over the course. A shift in wind direction aided Meyer's bid to win the stage, and after two hours passed, Meyer was able to take the stage victory, and the first yellow jersey. Several of the main contenders for the stage were caught out by the wind; Fabian Cancellara (RadioShack–Leopard) lost 22 seconds to Meyer, while Cannondale's Peter Sagan just broke the top 40 in the stage results, as he lost 35 seconds over the course.

Stage 1 Result and General Classification after Stage 1

	Rider	Team	Time
1	Cameron Meyer (AUS)	Orica–GreenEDGE	9' 39"
2	Niki Terpstra (NED)	Omega Pharma–Quick-Step	+ 10"
3	Heinrich Haussler (AUS)	IAM Cycling	+ 14"
4	Alex Rasmussen (DEN)	Garmin–Sharp	+ 15"
5	Gorka Verdugo (ESP)	Euskaltel–Euskadi	+ 16"
6	Reto Hollenstein (SUI)	IAM Cycling	+ 16"
7	Michel Koch (GER)	Cannondale	+ 18"
8	Peter Velits (SVK)	Omega Pharma–Quick-Step	+ 19"
9	Ryder Hesjedal (CAN)	Garmin–Sharp	+ 19"
10	Matteo Tosatto (ITA)	Saxo–Tinkoff	+ 19"

=== Stage 2 ===
9 June 2013 — Ulrichen to Crans-Montana, 117.2 km (72.8 mi)

After originally being scheduled to be held over a distance of 170.7 km (106.1 mi), race organisers announced prior to the race that the stage would be shortened to 161.3 km (100.2 mi). A further amendment was made the night before the stage was due to be run, reducing the stage yet further, to 117.2 km (72.8 mi). The amendment was due to heavy snow on what was due to be the first categorised climb of the race, the Nufenen Pass, which had made the roads impassable. The stage start was moved to Ulrichen, which had been due to be the first town in which the peloton would have passed on the descent from the climb. The new parcours was largely downhill to start, before flattening out; it passed through two intermediate sprint points at Sierre and Sion before reaching the first-category climb to Crans-Montana. A 16 km (9.9 mi) long climb, the ascent averaged over 6%, and was featuring in the race after a year's absence in 2012; the previous stage finish was won by Mauricio Soler in 2011, before he crashed heavily later in that race, which ultimately ended his cycling career.

After a quick opening to the stage, the breakaway was formed inside the opening 20 km (12.4 mi) of racing. Movistar Team rider Enrique Sanz was joined by Ag2r–La Mondiale's Christophe Riblon, Adrián Sáez (Euskaltel–Euskadi) and Johannes Fröhlinger of Argos–Shimano made up the group, and managed to accrue a maximum advantage of approaching three minutes around halfway through the stage. Sanz led the group through each of the intermediate sprint points, as the peloton started to close on the lead quartet. Riblon attacked his companions with around 25 km (15.5 mi) remaining, but he was caught several kilometres later, and the group as a whole were caught just as the final climb commenced. FDJ led onto the climb, with Thibaut Pinot expected to challenge for the stage. Dan Martin (Garmin–Sharp) launched the first major attack on the ascent, with his team-mate Ryder Hesjedal eventually bridging up to him with three other riders.

A high pace that was being set by the Garmin–Sharp duo reduced the group of five to just three, with only Astana rider Tanel Kangert being able to stick within the small group, which was around fifteen seconds ahead of the main field. Hesjedal then took the front, and Martin dropped back, which allowed the gap to further extend up to half a minute with around 6 km (3.7 mi) remaining. Hesjedal kicked on from Kangert a couple of kilometres later, and led across the line in which mountains classification points were being offered. Several other riders launched punchy moves as they approached the final kilometre, with the strongest coming from IAM Cycling's Johann Tschopp and Bauke Mollema of Blanco Pro Cycling. Mollema closed in on Hesjedal inside the final kilometre, and accelerated away to claim his first stage victory since the 2010 Tour de Pologne, despite receiving a 20-second penalty post-stage for receiving a bidon in an area too close to the finish. Overnight leader Cameron Meyer (Orica–GreenEDGE) was able to maintain the yellow jersey by three seconds from Hesjedal.

Stage 2 Result

	Rider	Team	Time
1	Bauke Mollema (NED)	Blanco Pro Cycling	2h 43' 00"
2	Mathias Frank (SUI)	BMC Racing Team	+ 11"
3	Thibaut Pinot (FRA)	FDJ	+ 11"
4	Ryder Hesjedal (CAN)	Garmin–Sharp	+ 11"
5	Johann Tschopp (SUI)	IAM Cycling	+ 11"
6	Dan Martin (IRL)	Garmin–Sharp	+ 11"
7	Roman Kreuziger (CZE)	Saxo–Tinkoff	+ 11"
8	Michele Scarponi (ITA)	Lampre–Merida	+ 11"
9	Giovanni Visconti (ITA)	Movistar Team	+ 19"
10	Domenico Pozzovivo (ITA)	Ag2r–La Mondiale	+ 19"

General Classification after Stage 2

	Rider	Team	Time
1	Cameron Meyer (AUS)	Orica–GreenEDGE	2h 53' 06"
2	Ryder Hesjedal (CAN)	Garmin–Sharp	+ 3"
3	Mathias Frank (SUI)	BMC Racing Team	+ 5"
4	Giovanni Visconti (ITA)	Movistar Team	+ 12"
5	Thibaut Pinot (FRA)	FDJ	+ 16"
6	Roman Kreuziger (CZE)	Saxo–Tinkoff	+ 28"
7	Moreno Moser (ITA)	Cannondale	+ 34"
8	Bauke Mollema (NED)	Blanco Pro Cycling	+ 34"
9	Alexsandr Dyachenko (KAZ)	Astana	+ 35"
10	Domenico Pozzovivo (ITA)	Ag2r–La Mondiale	+ 36"

=== Stage 3 ===
10 June 2013 — Montreux to Meiringen, 204.9 km (127.3 mi)

The third stage of the race was a transitional stage, starting from Montreux alongside the banks of Lake Geneva and heading north towards Bern on an undulating route. This route included a third-category climb at the Chemin de Lorette in Fribourg, as it meandered its way towards the stage finish at Meiringen. Prior to reaching Meiringen for the first time, an intermediate sprint point was passed in the village of Brienz, on the northern shore of Lake Brienz. At Meiringen, there was a short, punchy fourth-category climb at the Grimselstrasse, a 2 km (1.2 mi) climb of 5.6% in gradient, and after another intermediate sprint at Innertkirchen, set the riders up for the day's major ascent. That ascent was the first-category climb of the Hasliberg, measuring 6.3% over 12 km (7.5 mi), with portions approaching 10%; the gradient was stunted somewhat by a short false-flat halfway up the climb. A fast, technical descent – with speeds reaching a maximum of around 90 km/h (56 mph) – followed the summit, and brought the riders back to Meiringen, where the final 2 km (1.2 mi) of racing were flat, with straight roads.

With heavy rain on the route, the peloton went through a testing portion of the course in the opening kilometres and enabled the group to split apart for a period before reforming several kilometres later. On the climb at the Chemin de Lorette, the breakaway formed with eighteen riders heading up the road ahead of the peloton. Despite such a large group going ahead, the peloton – being led by the Orica–GreenEDGE team – kept the lead gap in check at between three and three-and-a-half minutes. The group started to splinter as it headed towards Meiringen for the first time, while in the peloton, Ryder Hesjedal (Garmin–Sharp), who had been lying second place overall, crashed out of the race. He was taken to hospital, where he was diagnosed with "multiple contusions and abrasions", but no fractured bones. The nine leaders crossed the finish line in Meiringen ahead of the closing 37 km (23.0 mi) loop, and held a lead of around two minutes over the peloton.

After Omega Pharma–Quick-Step's Tom Boonen led over the fourth-category precursor to the Hasliberg, the lead group thinned yet further, ultimately leaving four riders at the head of proceedings – Blanco Pro Cycling rider Wilco Kelderman, Matti Breschel (Saxo–Tinkoff), Martin Elmiger of IAM Cycling, and Orica–GreenEDGE's Michael Albasini – but the remnants of the peloton were inside a minute of the group. BMC Racing Team's pace on the front with Tejay van Garderen and Mathias Frank had reduced the group to around fifteen riders, with yellow jersey wearer Cameron Meyer (Orica–GreenEDGE) among those dropped. The groups merged towards the top, where Breschel's team-mate Roman Kreuziger attacked clear, with Cannondale's Peter Sagan, Frank and Rui Costa of the Movistar Team bridged across. The four riders remained off the front until the finish, where Sagan out-sprinted the rest for his seventh career victory at the Tour de Suisse. Fourth place for Frank was good enough for him to claim the race leader's yellow jersey; his first race lead at his home Tour.

Stage 3 Result

	Rider	Team	Time
1	Peter Sagan (SVK)	Cannondale	4h 46' 27"
2	Rui Costa (POR)	Movistar Team	s.t.
3	Roman Kreuziger (CZE)	Saxo–Tinkoff	s.t.
4	Mathias Frank (SUI)	BMC Racing Team	s.t.
5	Bauke Mollema (NED)	Blanco Pro Cycling	+ 39"
6	Giovanni Visconti (ITA)	Movistar Team	+ 46"
7	Dan Martin (IRL)	Garmin–Sharp	+ 46"
8	Thibaut Pinot (FRA)	FDJ	+ 46"
9	Tanel Kangert (EST)	Astana	+ 46"
10	Jean-Christophe Péraud (FRA)	Ag2r–La Mondiale	+ 46"

General Classification after Stage 3

	Rider	Team	Time
1	Mathias Frank (SUI)	BMC Racing Team	7h 39' 38"
2	Roman Kreuziger (CZE)	Saxo–Tinkoff	+ 23"
3	Rui Costa (POR)	Movistar Team	+ 35"
4	Giovanni Visconti (ITA)	Movistar Team	+ 53"
5	Thibaut Pinot (FRA)	FDJ	+ 57"
6	Bauke Mollema (NED)	Blanco Pro Cycling	+ 1' 08"
7	Dan Martin (IRL)	Garmin–Sharp	+ 1' 23"
8	Tanel Kangert (EST)	Astana	+ 1' 26"
9	Jean-Christophe Péraud (FRA)	Ag2r–La Mondiale	+ 1' 28"
10	Tejay van Garderen (USA)	BMC Racing Team	+ 1' 39"

=== Stage 4 ===
11 June 2013 — Innertkirchen to Buochs, 174.4 km (108.4 mi)

The fourth stage of the race was one of a select few to be aimed towards the sprinters that took to the start at the commencement of the race in Quinto. Starting in Innertkirchen, the opening quarter of the stage was relatively flat prior to the first of the day's three categorised climbs, a second-category climb at Schwanden. A two-part descent with a long period of flat during it, the route returned to flatter ground in Heimberg. An undulating next 50 km (31.1 mi) followed, passing through the first intermediate sprint in Schüpfheim. The intermediate sprint was closely followed by the second-category Rengg ascent, which was seen as a pivotal part of the route, as its steepness was certain to test some sprinters and their endurance towards the finish. At 3.7 km (2.3 mi) long, the climb also had an average gradient of 6.2%. From the descent, it was almost flat all the way to Buochs, save for a fourth-category kicker – the Rengglochstrasse – near Kriens; the finish was also technical, with a testing 90-degree left-hand turn with just 200 metres (660 ft) remaining.

The day's breakaway formed quickly after the start, with RadioShack–Leopard rider Jens Voigt, Robert Vrečer of Euskaltel–Euskadi and Lotto–Belisol's Olivier Kaisen going clear, and causing no threat to the peloton as a whole. The lead trio built up an advantage on the road of over four minutes, before the sprinters' teams set about reducing the advantage ahead of the finish. Kaisen was dropped on the Rengglochstrasse, with the main field within two minutes of the two remaining leaders on the road. Voigt and Vrečer had to momentarily stop for a closed level crossing just inside of the final 10 km (6.2 mi), as their lead was cut to around thirty seconds. Voigt attacked with 5 km (3.1 mi) remaining, but was still being closed down by the main field; the peloton caught Vrečer just over a kilometre later, while Voigt was brought back at 1.8 km (1.1 mi) to go. This ultimately set up the sprint finish, where FDJ's Arnaud Démare reached the final left-hand turn first, and managed to fend off a quick-finishing Matthew Goss (Orica–GreenEDGE) to take the stage win.

Stage 4 Result

	Rider	Team	Time
1	Arnaud Démare (FRA)	FDJ	4h 08' 23"
2	Matthew Goss (AUS)	Orica–GreenEDGE	s.t.
3	Tyler Farrar (USA)	Garmin–Sharp	s.t.
4	John Degenkolb (GER)	Argos–Shimano	s.t.
5	Alexander Kristoff (NOR)	Team Katusha	s.t.
6	Heinrich Haussler (AUS)	IAM Cycling	s.t.
7	Peter Sagan (SVK)	Cannondale	s.t.
8	Jens Debusschere (BEL)	Lotto–Belisol	s.t.
9	Davide Cimolai (ITA)	Lampre–Merida	s.t.
10	Jacopo Guarnieri (ITA)	Astana	s.t.

General Classification after Stage 4

	Rider	Team	Time
1	Mathias Frank (SUI)	BMC Racing Team	11h 48' 01"
2	Roman Kreuziger (CZE)	Saxo–Tinkoff	+ 23"
3	Rui Costa (POR)	Movistar Team	+ 35"
4	Giovanni Visconti (ITA)	Movistar Team	+ 53"
5	Thibaut Pinot (FRA)	FDJ	+ 57"
6	Bauke Mollema (NED)	Blanco Pro Cycling	+ 1' 08"
7	Dan Martin (IRL)	Garmin–Sharp	+ 1' 23"
8	Tanel Kangert (EST)	Astana	+ 1' 26"
9	Jean-Christophe Péraud (FRA)	Ag2r–La Mondiale	+ 1' 28"
10	Tejay van Garderen (USA)	BMC Racing Team	+ 1' 39"

=== Stage 5 ===
12 June 2013 — Buochs to Leuggern, 178.4 km (110.9 mi)

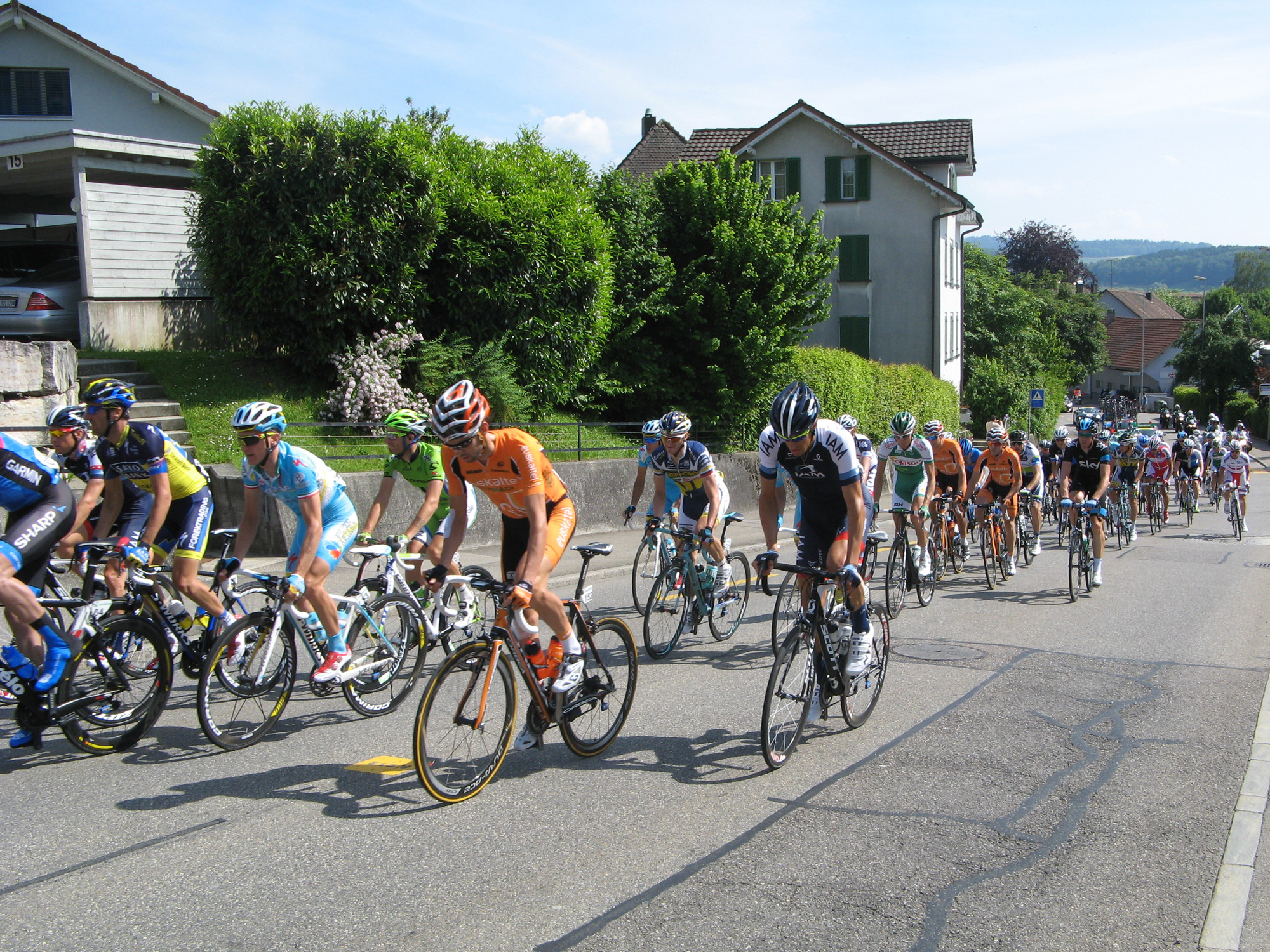
The peloton passing through Wohlen, around 75 km (46.6 mi) into the stage.

The midway point of the race was marked with a stage heading from Buochs towards the outskirts of Lucerne, bypassing it around Horw and Malters. Having navigated their way around, the peloton continued directly north on their 178.4 km (110.9 mi) parcours, towards the Swiss-German border and a finishing circuit around Leuggern. Around two-and-a-half laps were completed of the 26.5 km (16.5 mi) circuit, with five categorised climbs (all fourth-category) and two intermediate sprints to be contested in Döttingen, prior to the finish in Leuggern itself. Of the five climbs, only two different hills were ascented; the Zurziberg was tackled three times on the route, while the Loorweg was climbed twice, but neither were expected to distance the sprinters, with average gradients of 5% apiece. Inside the final kilometre, the road kicked up with a 4% gradient, and was expected to favour power sprinters such as Cannondale's Peter Sagan and John Degenkolb of Argos–Shimano.

After around 18 km (11.2 mi) of racing, the day's breakaway was formed; four riders went clear – Stijn Devolder of RadioShack–Leopard, Sojasun rider Cyril Lemoine, Sébastien Minard (Ag2r–La Mondiale) and Omega Pharma–Quick-Step's Serge Pauwels – and ultimately pulled clear to an advantage of almost three minutes at one point during the stage, and reached the finishing circuit with around two minutes of that gap still remaining. Behind, Giovanni Visconti, who had been lying in fourth place overall, exited the race with serious bruising and skin loss, after a crash. On the first full lap of the closing circuit, Saxo–Tinkoff rider Michael Mørkøv attacked on the Zurziberg, and managed to pull clear by around 30 seconds on the climb itself. Further round the circuit, several riders hit the tarmac, as the peloton was forced to narrowly pass parked cars at the side of the road; Lotto–Belisol rider Jens Debusschere suffered the worst of the injuries, and although he was able to finish the stage, he withdrew following it after he was diagnosed with a fractured ulna.

Mørkøv's foray off the front of the peloton was not to last, and he was caught by the peloton, who crossed the finish line in Leuggern for the second time, just thirty seconds behind the four leaders. The leaders tried to up the pace on the Loorweg, but were caught even before they had reached the summit of the climb. BMC Racing Team led through the second intermediate sprint in protection of their race leader Mathias Frank, before IAM Cycling took up the front, ahead of the final ascent of the Zurziberg. Euskaltel–Euskadi's Jorge Azanza tried to go clear on the climb, but was caught prior to gaining a substantial advantage. This ultimately led to the final sprint; Astana had led into the final kilometre, with Cannondale chasing for Sagan, but with a lack of team-mates, he had to chase down the sprint first. Team Katusha's Alexander Kristoff moved ahead of him, and went on to take his first World Tour victory by around a bike length, ahead of Sagan and FDJ rider Arnaud Démare.

Stage 5 Result

	Rider	Team	Time
1	Alexander Kristoff (NOR)	Team Katusha	4h 08' 29"
2	Peter Sagan (SVK)	Cannondale	s.t.
3	Arnaud Démare (FRA)	FDJ	s.t.
4	Matti Breschel (DEN)	Saxo–Tinkoff	s.t.
5	Heinrich Haussler (AUS)	IAM Cycling	s.t.
6	Matthew Goss (AUS)	Orica–GreenEDGE	s.t.
7	Davide Cimolai (ITA)	Lampre–Merida	s.t.
8	Jacopo Guarnieri (ITA)	Astana	s.t.
9	Boy van Poppel (NED)	Vacansoleil–DCM	s.t.
10	Daryl Impey (RSA)	Orica–GreenEDGE	s.t.

General Classification after Stage 5

	Rider	Team	Time
1	Mathias Frank (SUI)	BMC Racing Team	15h 56' 30"
2	Roman Kreuziger (CZE)	Saxo–Tinkoff	+ 23"
3	Rui Costa (POR)	Movistar Team	+ 35"
4	Thibaut Pinot (FRA)	FDJ	+ 57"
5	Bauke Mollema (NED)	Blanco Pro Cycling	+ 1' 08"
6	Dan Martin (IRL)	Garmin–Sharp	+ 1' 23"
7	Tanel Kangert (EST)	Astana	+ 1' 26"
8	Jean-Christophe Péraud (FRA)	Ag2r–La Mondiale	+ 1' 28"
9	Tejay van Garderen (USA)	BMC Racing Team	+ 1' 39"
10	Cameron Meyer (AUS)	Orica–GreenEDGE	+ 1' 42"

=== Stage 6 ===
13 June 2013 — Leuggern to Meilen, 187.9 km (116.8 mi)

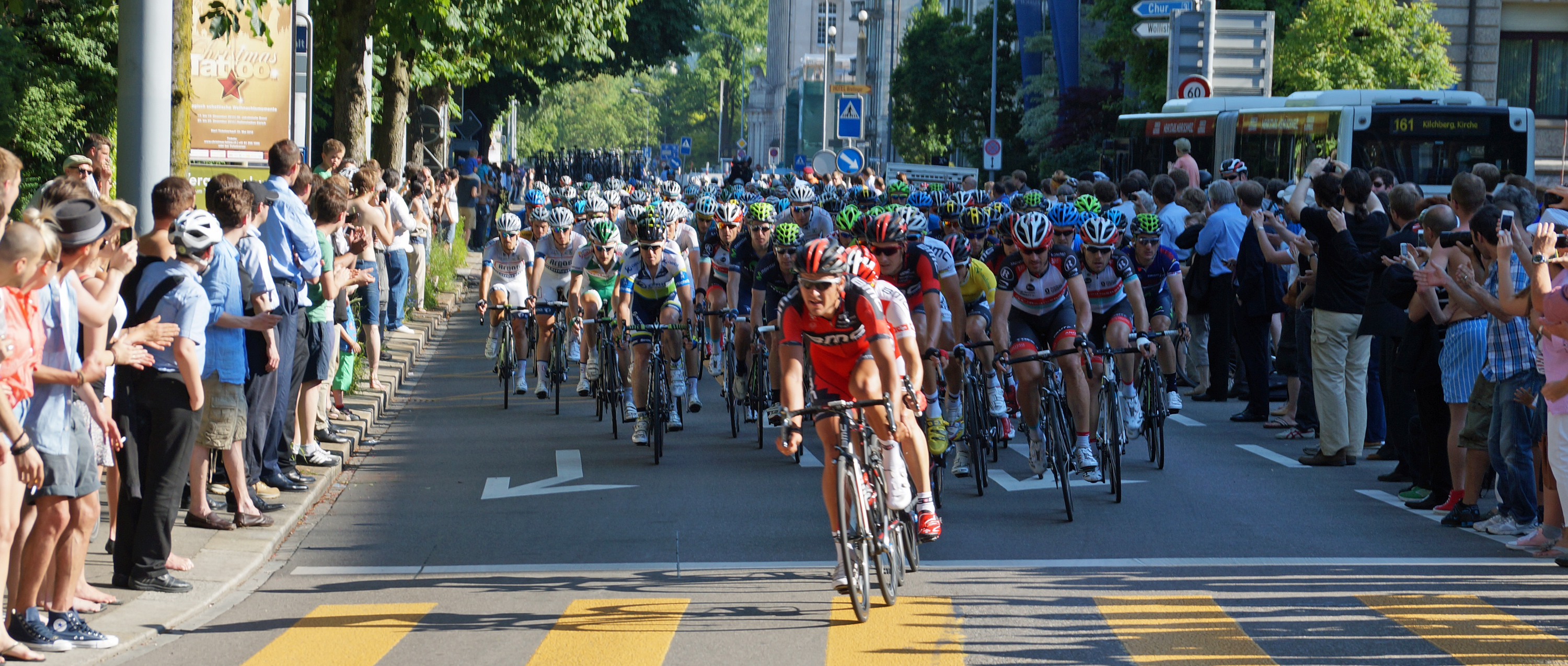
The peloton – being led by the BMC Racing Team – passing through Zürich, 40 km (24.9 mi) before the end of the stage.

The sixth stage of the race started in the previous day's finishing town of Leuggern and headed predominantly south-east away from the town. During the day's parcours of 187.9 km (116.8 mi), were two categorised climbs – both of which were categorised as third-category ascents – that both came in the second half of the stage; the first of which was the Schwändistrasse Fesisberg, a steep climb approaching 7% in gradient over a 3 km (1.9 mi) length. There were also two intermediate sprint points in the stage, held 17 km (10.6 mi) apart from one another. The first came at Küsnacht, after the race had made its way through Zürich, and continued alongside the banks of Lake Zurich. Having headed inland for the second climb – the Limberg, with gradients of up to 11% – the race moved back towards the Lake itself, passing through the second intermediate sprint at Oetwil am See; the race continued along the banks of the Lake until the finish in Meilen.

The day's breakaway took some time in forming, with around 30 km (18.6 mi) having been completed before the move was instigated. Four riders went clear and were given the blessing by the peloton to go clear and establish an advantage. The group consisted of Team Sky rider Mathew Hayman, Omega Pharma–Quick-Step's Bert Grabsch, Alexandr Kolobnev (Team Katusha) and Grégory Rast of RadioShack–Leopard, with the best-placed rider among the quartet being Rast, who trailed overnight leader Mathias Frank (BMC Racing Team) by over 25 minutes in the general classification. With no threats to the classification, the peloton elected not to chase down the lead four, and instead let them battle it out for stage honours. Their maximum lead hit quarter of an hour, but was under eleven by the time the field had reached the finish. Rast launched an opportunist move at the flamme rouge and was not chased down, to take his first Tour de Suisse stage win. Hayman and Kolobnev came in 25 seconds, with Grabsch at 28 seconds. The field came in with Cannondale rider Peter Sagan leading home in fifth place, 10' 43" behind Rast, and in the process, extending his points classification lead.

Stage 6 Result

	Rider	Team	Time
1	Grégory Rast (SUI)	RadioShack–Leopard	4h 23' 53"
2	Mathew Hayman (AUS)	Team Sky	+ 25"
3	Alexandr Kolobnev (RUS)	Team Katusha	+ 25"
4	Bert Grabsch (GER)	Omega Pharma–Quick-Step	+ 28"
5	Peter Sagan (SVK)	Cannondale	+ 10' 43"
6	John Degenkolb (GER)	Argos–Shimano	+ 10' 43"
7	Arnaud Démare (FRA)	FDJ	+ 10' 43"
8	Ben Swift (GBR)	Team Sky	+ 10' 43"
9	Davide Cimolai (ITA)	Lampre–Merida	+ 10' 43"
10	Tosh Van der Sande (BEL)	Lotto–Belisol	+ 10' 43"

General Classification after Stage 6

	Rider	Team	Time
1	Mathias Frank (SUI)	BMC Racing Team	20h 31' 06"
2	Roman Kreuziger (CZE)	Saxo–Tinkoff	+ 23"
3	Rui Costa (POR)	Movistar Team	+ 35"
4	Thibaut Pinot (FRA)	FDJ	+ 57"
5	Bauke Mollema (NED)	Blanco Pro Cycling	+ 1' 08"
6	Dan Martin (IRL)	Garmin–Sharp	+ 1' 23"
7	Tanel Kangert (EST)	Astana	+ 1' 26"
8	Jean-Christophe Péraud (FRA)	Ag2r–La Mondiale	+ 1' 28"
9	Tejay van Garderen (USA)	BMC Racing Team	+ 1' 39"
10	Cameron Meyer (AUS)	Orica–GreenEDGE	+ 1' 42"

=== Stage 7 ===
14 June 2013 — Meilen to La Punt, 206 km (128.0 mi)

The queen stage of the 2013 Tour de Suisse, the seventh stage had a somewhat docile start to its 206 km (128.0 mi) itinerary. Except for a third-category climb of the Kerenzerberg Pass – with a maximum gradient of about 10% – after around 52 km (32.3 mi) of racing, the first half of the stage was predominantly flat before the mountainous second half of the route. After moving towards the Prättigau valley, the first-category Prättigaustrasse was the first to be tackled; a climb of two halves, with a steady start and then a 7% kick up to the summit. After a gradual descent from the climb, the next climb started almost immediately after, with the fourth-category Hauptstrasse, but this was the set-up for the final climb, the hors catégorie ascent of the Albula Pass, reaching over 2,300 metres (7,500 ft) above sea level. After passing through the two intermediate sprints at Alvaneu and Bergün respectively, the climb had irregular gradients throughout; shallow to start with, portions of the climb averaged 10%. The descent was not too technical, despite a series of hairpin bends, but the closing metres were flat in La Punt.

Mini-attacks were key to the first hour and a half of racing, but the breakaway did not establish until almost 70 km (43.5 mi) were completed. Fourteen riders went clear of the field, with the best placed among them being Blanco Pro Cycling rider Luis León Sánchez, who trailed the overnight leader of the general classification, Mathias Frank (BMC Racing Team), by almost six-and-a-half minutes. The group managed to build up a lead of around five-and-a-half minutes at its maximum, but was around a quarter of that by the time the leaders reached the final climb of the day, the Albula Pass. Sánchez and Argos–Shimano's Georg Preidler attacked at the foot of the climb, while out of the peloton came a separate solo attack by Team Sky's Joe Dombrowski. Dombrowski soon caught up to the remnants of the breakaway group, before moving past them with fresher legs. Dombrowski soon made his way up to the lead duo of Sánchez and Preidler on the climb, and also left them behind as he continued his pace up the climb, and was almost a minute clear of the peloton with around 20 km (12.4 mi) to race.

Sánchez and Preidler were soon caught by the peloton, with the former's Blanco Pro Cycling team setting the pace on the front of the main field, as they started to close on Dombrowski. Towards the top of the climb, Bauke Mollema attacked, and was followed by FDJ's Thibaut Pinot, Tejay van Garderen of the BMC Racing Team and Rui Costa (Movistar Team), the defending race winner. Dan Martin (Garmin–Sharp) also joined the group for a period – making a sextet after Dombrowski had been caught near the top – but he was dropped along with Dombrowski towards the top of the climb, and on the descent. Pinot and Mollema were gapped by van Garderen and Costa, but Mollema was able to rejoin the lead pair, after an inflatable arch – which had been erected to signify two kilometres left to race – had collapsed onto the road. The trio remained together down to La Punt, where Costa prevailed in a close sprint, ahead of Mollema and van Garderen. Frank finished 22 seconds behind Costa to maintain the race lead, but by a reduced margin of 13 seconds.

Stage 7 Result

	Rider	Team	Time
1	Rui Costa (POR)	Movistar Team	5h 11' 08"
2	Bauke Mollema (NED)	Blanco Pro Cycling	s.t.
3	Tejay van Garderen (USA)	BMC Racing Team	s.t.
4	Thibaut Pinot (FRA)	FDJ	+ 9"
5	Cameron Meyer (AUS)	Orica–GreenEDGE	+ 22"
6	Dan Martin (IRL)	Garmin–Sharp	+ 22"
7	Roman Kreuziger (CZE)	Saxo–Tinkoff	+ 22"
8	Simon Špilak (SLO)	Team Katusha	+ 22"
9	Mathias Frank (SUI)	BMC Racing Team	+ 22"
10	Joe Dombrowski (USA)	Team Sky	+ 22"

General Classification after Stage 7

	Rider	Team	Time
1	Mathias Frank (SUI)	BMC Racing Team	25h 42' 36"
2	Rui Costa (POR)	Movistar Team	+ 13"
3	Roman Kreuziger (CZE)	Saxo–Tinkoff	+ 23"
4	Thibaut Pinot (FRA)	FDJ	+ 44"
5	Bauke Mollema (NED)	Blanco Pro Cycling	+ 46"
6	Tejay van Garderen (USA)	BMC Racing Team	+ 1' 17"
7	Dan Martin (IRL)	Garmin–Sharp	+ 1' 23"
8	Cameron Meyer (AUS)	Orica–GreenEDGE	+ 1' 42"
9	Tanel Kangert (EST)	Astana	+ 1' 43"
10	Simon Špilak (SLO)	Team Katusha	+ 1' 50"

=== Stage 8 ===
15 June 2013 — Zernez to Bad Ragaz, 180.5 km (112.2 mi)

The penultimate stage started high in the mountains at Zernez; the stage start was almost 1,500 metres (4,900 ft) above sea level. The race steadily rose towards the first of two categorised climbs on the route, passing through the previous day's stage finish of La Punt, and also St. Moritz, before the ascent of the Julier Pass. The climb started at Silvaplana, and climbed almost 7 km (4.3 mi) to the summit, at an average gradient of around 6.6%. From there, a 60 km (37.3 mi) descent followed, taking the race back down to flatter grounds at Rhäzüns. After contesting the first intermediate sprint just outside Chur, the riders passed through the finish line in Bad Ragaz for the first time, prior to a 40 km (24.9 mi) closing loop. The second intermediate sprint came shortly after the line in Sargans, taking in several kilometres in Liechtenstein, prior to the third-category kicker at the St. Luzisteig Pass – with a maximum gradient of 12% – just 6 km (3.7 mi) from the finish. A fast descent followed, before the final 2 km (1.2 mi) were flat.

Soon after the stage begun, the breakaway was formed; a group of four riders went clear, with the group consisting of Reto Hollenstein (IAM Cycling), Lampre–Merida's Manuele Mori, Maxime Bouet (Ag2r–La Mondiale) and Euskaltel–Euskadi rider Robert Vrečer, who was looking to regain the lead of the mountains classification that he lost to Thibaut Pinot of FDJ on the previous stage. Vrečer led the group over the Julier Pass, where the quartet enjoyed their largest advantage of the day, at almost five-and-a-half minutes. The lead dropped as they progressed through the itinerary, and the advantage was around a minute with 26 km (16.2 mi) to go. Hollenstein attacked the rest of his companions at this point, and managed to remain clear until around 17 km (10.6 mi) to go, where the peloton moved past under the impetus of the Orica–GreenEDGE team, with assistance from Cannondale.

With Orica–GreenEDGE on the front, their team leader Cameron Meyer suffered a puncture prior to the final climb; the resultant time gap was too much for him to bridge back to, and he ultimately lost almost half a minute to the peloton by stage's end. As the peloton made their way up the St. Luzisteig Pass, a high pace was causing fractures within the group, and with added assistance from Saxo–Tinkoff, the group was made up of thirty-four riders on the descent. BMC Racing Team's Philippe Gilbert tried to launch an attack not long after – the incumbent world champion looking to take his first victory in the rainbow jersey – but he was brought back by Sagan's team. It ultimately set up the sprint finish, with race leader Mathias Frank trying to lead Gilbert out; Saxo–Tinkoff's Daniele Bennati was first to launch, but Sagan sped past to take a comfortable victory, his second of the race. Frank finished within the group, to maintain his 13-second lead over Rui Costa (Movistar Team) into the final time trial.

Stage 8 Result

	Rider	Team	Time
1	Peter Sagan (SVK)	Cannondale	4h 33' 26"
2	Daniele Bennati (ITA)	Saxo–Tinkoff	s.t.
3	Philippe Gilbert (BEL)	BMC Racing Team	s.t.
4	Michael Albasini (SUI)	Orica–GreenEDGE	s.t.
5	Christophe Riblon (FRA)	Ag2r–La Mondiale	s.t.
6	Martin Elmiger (SUI)	IAM Cycling	s.t.
7	Peter Velits (SVK)	Omega Pharma–Quick-Step	s.t.
8	Julien Simon (FRA)	Sojasun	s.t.
9	Maxime Monfort (BEL)	RadioShack–Leopard	s.t.
10	Simon Geschke (GER)	Argos–Shimano	s.t.

General Classification after Stage 8

	Rider	Team	Time
1	Mathias Frank (SUI)	BMC Racing Team	30h 16' 02"
2	Rui Costa (POR)	Movistar Team	+ 13"
3	Roman Kreuziger (CZE)	Saxo–Tinkoff	+ 23"
4	Thibaut Pinot (FRA)	FDJ	+ 44"
5	Bauke Mollema (NED)	Blanco Pro Cycling	+ 46"
6	Tejay van Garderen (USA)	BMC Racing Team	+ 1' 17"
7	Dan Martin (IRL)	Garmin–Sharp	+ 1' 23"
8	Tanel Kangert (EST)	Astana	+ 1' 43"
9	Simon Špilak (SLO)	Team Katusha	+ 1' 50"
10	Cameron Meyer (AUS)	Orica–GreenEDGE	+ 2' 09"

=== Stage 9 ===
16 June 2013 — Bad Ragaz to Flumserberg, 26.8 km (16.7 mi), individual time trial (ITT)

With less than a minute covering the top five, the final stage was the one to decide the general classification of the 2013 Tour de Suisse. The final time trial stage was set up unconventionally, with the 26.8 km (16.7 mi) itinerary split into two distinct sections. The opening 16.5 km (10.3 mi) from the start in Bad Ragaz was flat, heading towards the first intermediate time-check at Flums. From there on, the route headed upwards towards the finish at Flumserberg. The first element of the climb towards the second time-check averaged around 8.5% over a distance of 5.4 km (3.4 mi), with the final 4.9 km (3.0 mi) slightly steeper, averaging 9.5%. Such was the climb, it was expected that riders would start the stage on time-trial machinery, before stopping to change to a road bike prior to the climb. As was customary of time trial stages, cyclists set off in reverse order from where they were ranked in the general classification at the end of the previous stage. Thus, Olivier Kaisen of Lotto–Belisol, who, in 151st place, trailed overall leader Mathias Frank (BMC Racing Team) by one hour, thirty minutes and forty seconds, was the first rider to set off on the stage.

He was not first to finish however, as he was passed by Garmin–Sharp's Alex Rasmussen on the road; Rasmussen ultimately set the benchmark at just under 62 minutes, which was almost immediately beaten by Orica–GreenEDGE rider Sam Bewley, who moved the fastest time towards the hour mark. Bewley's team-mate Stuart O'Grady comfortably took the fastest time several minutes later, recording a time of 57' 54" for the course. Cyril Lemoine (Sojasun) took nearly a minute off O'Grady's time to take top spot for a period, before Team Katusha rider Alexander Kristoff repeated the feat on Lemoine's time, taking the fastest time with 55' 58". His time was not threatened for the best part of half an hour, before his team-mate Gatis Smukulis bettered the target time, recording a time of 55' 35" for the course, before Daryl Impey (Orica–GreenEDGE) was next to go fastest, ten seconds quicker than Smukulis. Andreas Klöden of RadioShack–Leopard was first under 55 minutes, with 54' 36", a time that was matched exactly fifteen minutes later by the Movistar Team's Jesús Herrada. Points classification winner Peter Sagan (Cannondale) and FDJ team-mates Jérémy Roy and Arnold Jeannesson all enjoyed spells at the top of the timesheets, as the best time continued to tumble.

Euskaltel–Euskadi and Jon Izagirre were next, setting a time of 53' 23", before Andrey Amador (Movistar Team) moved the target below 53 minutes, with a time ultimately bettered by only four riders. Jean-Christophe Péraud (Ag2r–La Mondiale) bettered Amador's time by one second to take top spot, which held into the top ten riders. Astana's Tanel Kangert – the final stage winner in 2012, when that edition ended with a mountain stage – took the lead from Péraud with 52' 17", which was good enough for second. The pre-stage favourite, Tejay van Garderen (BMC Racing Team), faded on the course, losing almost a minute to Kangert. Blanco Pro Cycling's Bauke Mollema was only eight seconds off Kangert's time, while Thibaut Pinot (FDJ) and Roman Kreuziger of Saxo–Tinkoff lost more than half a minute. However, Kangert's time was to be beaten by the eventual race-winner, Rui Costa of the Movistar Team. He was the only rider to break 52 minutes with 51' 56", and as Frank rolled across the line almost two minutes down – to finish fifth overall – Costa became the first back-to-back winner since Andrew Hampsten in 1986 and 1987. Mollema was the biggest mover among the leaders, moving from fifth to second, ahead of Kreuziger.

Stage 9 Result

	Rider	Team	Time
1	Rui Costa (POR)	Movistar Team	51' 56"
2	Tanel Kangert (EST)	Astana	+ 21"
3	Bauke Mollema (NED)	Blanco Pro Cycling	+ 29"
4	Jean-Christophe Péraud (FRA)	Ag2r–La Mondiale	+ 42"
5	Andrey Amador (CRC)	Movistar Team	+ 43"
6	Thibaut Pinot (FRA)	FDJ	+ 55"
7	Roman Kreuziger (CZE)	Saxo–Tinkoff	+ 1' 00"
8	Simon Špilak (SLO)	Team Katusha	+ 1' 05"
9	Janez Brajkovič (SLO)	Astana	+ 1' 06"
10	Tejay van Garderen (USA)	BMC Racing Team	+ 1' 19"

Final General Classification

	Rider	Team	Time
1	Rui Costa (POR)	Movistar Team	31h 08' 11"
2	Bauke Mollema (NED)	Blanco Pro Cycling	+ 1' 02"
3	Roman Kreuziger (CZE)	Saxo–Tinkoff	+ 1' 10"
4	Thibaut Pinot (FRA)	FDJ	+ 1' 26"
5	Mathias Frank (SUI)	BMC Racing Team	+ 1' 43"
6	Tanel Kangert (EST)	Astana	+ 1' 51"
7	Tejay van Garderen (USA)	BMC Racing Team	+ 2' 23"
8	Dan Martin (IRL)	Garmin–Sharp	+ 2' 42"
9	Simon Špilak (SLO)	Team Katusha	+ 2' 42"
10	Cameron Meyer (AUS)	Orica–GreenEDGE	+ 3' 44"

== Classification leadership table ==
In the 2013 Tour de Suisse, four different jerseys were awarded. For the general classification, calculated by adding each cyclist's finishing times on each stage, and the leader received a yellow jersey. This classification was considered the most important of the 2013 Tour de Suisse, and the winner of the classification was considered the winner of the race. There was also a mountains classification, the leadership of which was marked by a red jersey. In the mountains classification, points were won by reaching the top of a climb before other cyclists, with more points available for the higher-categorised climbs; there were twenty-one categorised climbs in the race, split into five distinctive categories.

The third jersey represented the points classification, marked by a white-and-red jersey. In the points classification, cyclists got points for finishing highly in a stage. For stages 4, 5, 6 and 8, the win earned 25 points, second place earned 20 points, third 16, fourth 13, fifth 11, and one point fewer per place down to a single point for 15th. For all other stages, the win earned 15 points, second place earned 12 points, third 10, and one point fewer per place down to a single point for 12th. Points could also be earned at intermediate sprints for finishing in the top 3 at intermediate sprint points during each stage on a 6–3–1 scale.

The fourth jersey represented the sprints classification, marked by a blue jersey. In the sprints classification, cyclists received points for finishing in the top 3 at intermediate sprint points during each stage, with the exception of the individual time trial stages. There was also a classification for teams, in which the times of the best three cyclists per team on each stage were added together; the leading team at the end of the race was the team with the lowest total time.

Stage	Winner	General Classification	Mountains Classification	Points Classification	Sprints Classification	Team Classification
1	Cameron Meyer	Cameron Meyer	not awarded (Note: Although Cameron Meyer received the jerseys on the podium in Quinto, no points were on offer during the stage.)	Cameron Meyer	not awarded	Omega Pharma–Quick-Step
2	Bauke Mollema	Cameron Meyer	Ryder Hesjedal	Cameron Meyer	Enrique Sanz	IAM Cycling
3	Peter Sagan	Mathias Frank	Roman Kreuziger	Bauke Mollema	Enrique Sanz	Astana
4	Arnaud Démare	Mathias Frank	Robert Vrečer	Arnaud Démare	Enrique Sanz	Astana
5	Alexander Kristoff	Mathias Frank	Robert Vrečer	Peter Sagan	Enrique Sanz	Astana
6	Grégory Rast	Mathias Frank	Robert Vrečer	Peter Sagan	Enrique Sanz	Team Katusha
7	Rui Costa	Mathias Frank	Thibaut Pinot	Peter Sagan	Enrique Sanz	Astana
8	Peter Sagan	Mathias Frank	Robert Vrečer	Peter Sagan	Robert Vrečer	Astana
9	Rui Costa	Rui Costa	Robert Vrečer	Peter Sagan	Robert Vrečer	Astana
Final		Rui Costa	Robert Vrečer	Peter Sagan	Robert Vrečer	Astana
