= Valascia =

Indoor sporting arena in Ambrì, Switzerland

La Valascia
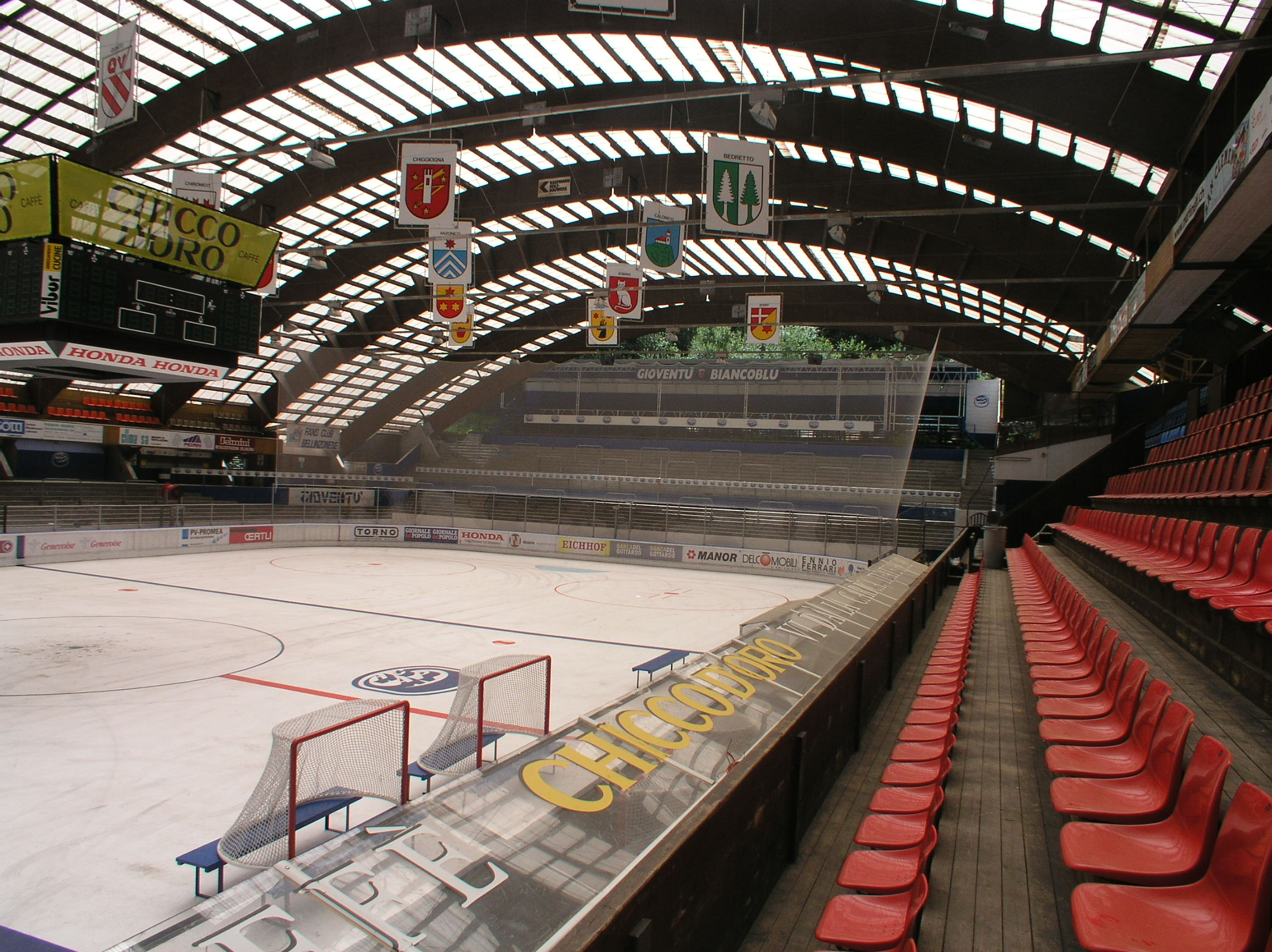
- Interactive map of La Valascia
- Location: Ambrì, Switzerland
- Coordinates: 46.509203°N 8.691944°E
- Owner: HC Ambrì-Piotta
- Capacity: 6,500 (2,000 seated, 4,500 standing)
- Record attendance: 9,000 (1987 - HC Ambrì-Piotta vs. HC Lugano)

Construction
- Opened: 1959
- Renovated: 1979 (roof added); 2007
- Closed: April 2021
- Demolished: 2021

Tenant
- HC Ambrì-Piotta (NL) (1959-2021)

Valascia was an indoor sporting arena located in Ambrì, Switzerland. The capacity of the arena was 6,500 and was built in 1959. It served as the home arena of the HC Ambri-Piotta ice hockey team of the National League (NL) from 1959 to 2021.

Even when the rink was being covered with a roof in 1979, the ends of the arena stayed open, making hockey being played there partially outdoor with low temperatures in the arena.

The team moved to the nearby newly built arena for the 2021/22 season. Valascia has been destroyed and renatured in summer 2022 as it was located in a potential avalanche path. Renovation wasn't possible as it would bring the total capacity below the required 6,000 to compete in the National League and the arena would still face danger from potential avalanches.

== History ==
Originally, Ambri-Piotta played since 1937 on the Pista di Cava and later moved to Valascia where in 1959, artificial ice production was introduced.

Construction for the new arena was scheduled to begin in July 2017 before being postponed to a later date. On August 30, 2018, HC Ambri-Piotta announced that construction for the new Valascia is set to begin in October 2018 and should be ready to open by 2021. After multiple delays, construction officially began in April 2019, with completion due for the start of the 2021/22 season.

On April 5, 2021, Ambri-Piotta played its final game in the Valascia, a 2–3 loss to HC Fribourg-Gottéron, behind closed doors because of the COVID-19 pandemic.

== See also ==
- Piotta
- Ambrì Airport
- Ambrì-Piotta railway station
