= Piotta =

Piotta may refer to:

- Piotta (musician)
- Piotta, Switzerland, in the municipality of Quinto, canton of Ticino
