= Nuova Valascia =

Ice Hockey Arena

Gottardo Arena
- Interactive map of Gottardo Arena
- Location: Ambrì, Ticino, Switzerland
- Coordinates: 46.51313°N 8.69667°E
- Owner: Valascia Immobiliare SA
- Capacity: 6,775

Construction
- Groundbreaking: April 2019
- Built: 2019-2021
- Opened: September 11, 2021
- Cost: CHF 51 million
- Architect: Mario Botta
- Project manager: Raul Reali

Tenant
- HC Ambrì-Piotta (NL) (2021-present)

The Gottardo Arena is an ice hockey arena in Ambrì, Ticino, Switzerland. It is located only a few feet away from the former Valascia. The inauguration took place on September 11, 2021.

The arena serves as the home for HC Ambrì-Piotta of the National League (NL) and seats up to 6,775 spectators for hockey games.

== Background ==
HC Ambrì-Piotta held the groundbreaking ceremony in December 2018 and construction officially began in April 2019, 60 years after the former Valascia opened. Construction for the arena had been postponed for two consecutive years as plans were to start in early 2017. The SIHF had been rushing Ambri-Piotta to begin building a new arena to let them compete in the National League as the old arena no longer met security regulations and was located in a potential avalanche path.

== Opening ==
On September 11, 2021, the arena hosted its first official game, a 6-2 Ambri-Piotta win over Fribourg-Gotteron in a sellout NuoValascia. Ambri-Piotta's Johnny Kneubuehler is the first player to score a goal in the arena.

== Naming ==
The arena is now known as the Gottardo Arena or Gotthard Arena

== See also ==
- List of indoor arenas in Switzerland
