= HC Ambrì-Piotta =

Swiss professional ice hockey club

- City: Ambrì and Piotta (Quinto, Switzerland)
- League: National League
- Founded: 1937
- Home arena: Gottardo Arena
- Colors
- General manager: Paolo Duca
- Head coach: Jussi Tapola
- Captain: Tommaso de Luca
- Affiliates: GDT Bellinzona Snakes
- Website: www.hcap.ch

Hockey Club Ambrì-Piotta is a professional ice hockey team based in Ambrì, Switzerland. The team competes in the National League (NL), the highest league in Switzerland. It was founded on September 19, 1937, and is also known as "Bianco-Blu" (English: white and blues). Though they have never won the league championship, the club has not been relegated to the Swiss League since being promoted in 1985, the same year that saw the arrival of Dale McCourt.

The team plays its home games in the Gottardo Arena.

== History ==
Ambrì and Piotta are two small villages in the municipality of Quinto, located in the northern part of the valley Leventina canton Ticino, with a combined population of 500 people. Ambrì-Piotta has more than 40 fan clubs all over Europe. For major events, like the derby against southern rivals HC Lugano, the fans compose a choreography. When Ambrì wins a game, fans rejoice to the valley anthem "La Montanara".

Since 1959, they have called their self-owned Valascia as their home. Standing 1,000 metres above sea level, it is an open-ended facility with 2,000 seats and additional standing room space for 5,000.

In the summer of 2013, the team raised roughly five million Swiss francs in response to financial difficulties. The donations given to HC Ambrì-Piotta came from both large and small donations, many of which were given via SMS. The efforts of the team and its fans have secured the right to play in the National League.

== Club culture and supporters ==
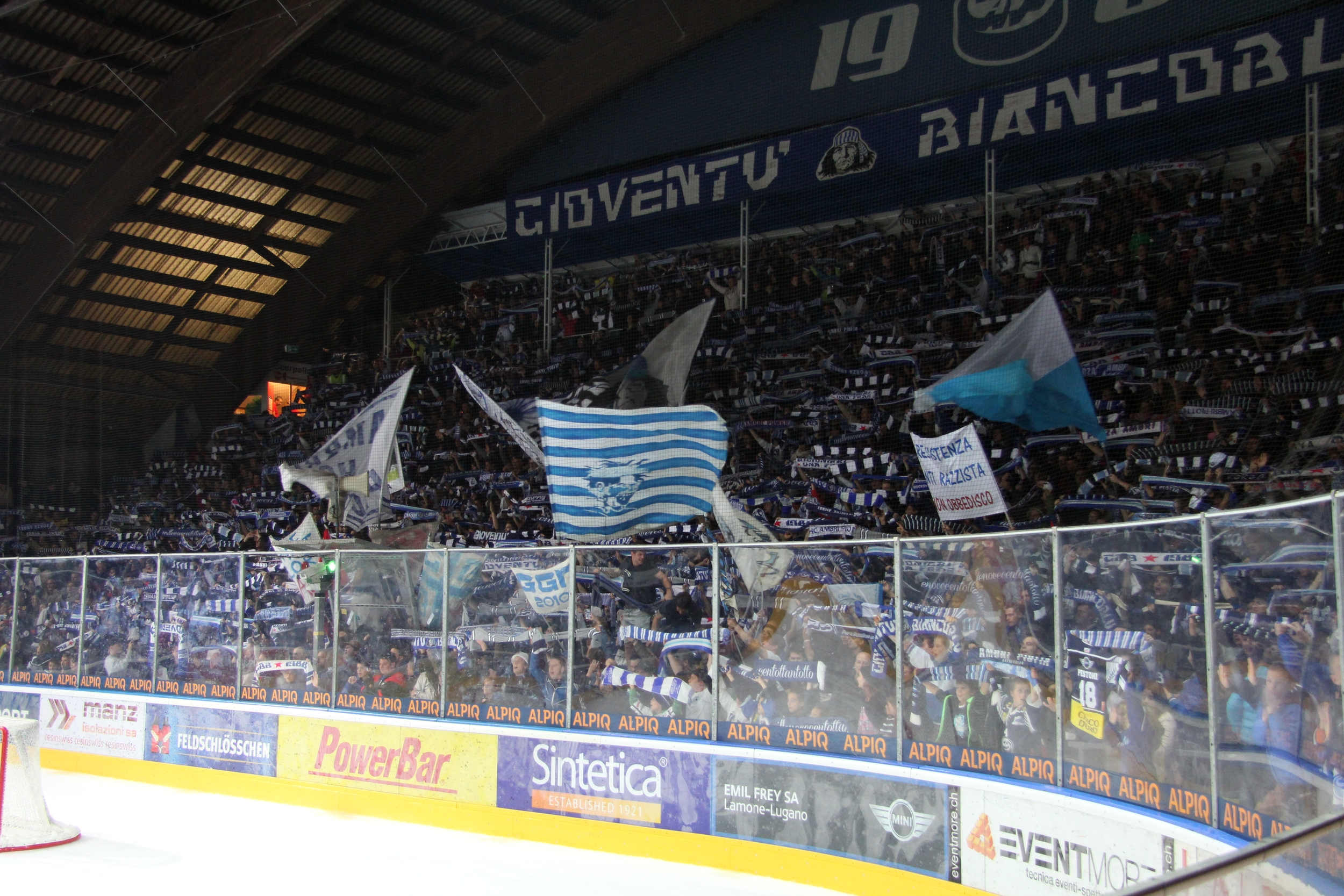
HC Ambrì-Piotta supporters in 2014

Supporter culture at Ambrì-Piotta is highly organised and historically politicised compared to most Swiss ice hockey clubs. Since the late 1980s, the most visible organised group has been the Gioventù Biancoblù ("White and Blue Youth"), founded around 1989. The group draws inspiration from Italian ultra culture and operates in a self-managed structure, funding itself through merchandise sales rather than sponsorship. It has traditionally occupied the Curva Sud, the standing section behind one goal. Its banners and iconography have included portraits of Che Guevara and the Apache leader Geronimo, which members have described as symbols of resistance, anti-racism and identification with a small, marginalised club rather than explicit ideological politics. One founder of a supporters group stated in 1999 that Che Guevara symbolised "the one who fights for justice" and the "romantic" dimension of struggle.

The supporters' self-image has consistently been tied to opposition against wealthier and more successful clubs, particularly HC Lugano. This rivalry has been framed in social and regional terms, contrasting northern, rural Ticino with the more affluent southern part of the canton. Chants such as "Il Ticino è Biancoblù" ("Ticino is White and Blue") have been used since at least the 1990s to assert this identity. The traditional singing of the alpine folk song "La Montanara" after home victories became a defining ritual by the 1990s and remains in use.

Relations between organised supporters and club management have not always been harmonious. In 1997, protests against the head coach led to banners being displayed inside the arena, subsequent bans imposed by the club, a coordinated boycott by supporters, and demonstrations outside the Valascia. Afterwards, the bans were lifted. Supporters have also publicly opposed corporate ownership or naming-rights arrangements. During financial crises, banners such as "Senza padroni" ("No masters") appeared, expressing rejection of external control.

Attendance figures have regularly exceeded 5,000 per game since the 1990s, with a significant proportion of fans travelling from outside Ticino, including German-speaking Switzerland and northern Italy. Attendance of away games by several hundred supporters has been recorded for domestic and European matches, including Champions Hockey League fixtures after Ambrì qualified for the competition for the first time in 2019.

In recent years, tensions between supporters and authorities have continued. In December 2025, the standing section carried out a silent boycott during a home match against Genève-Servette after the club filed a legal complaint following pyrotechnics and trespassing incidents at an earlier game.

== Honours ==
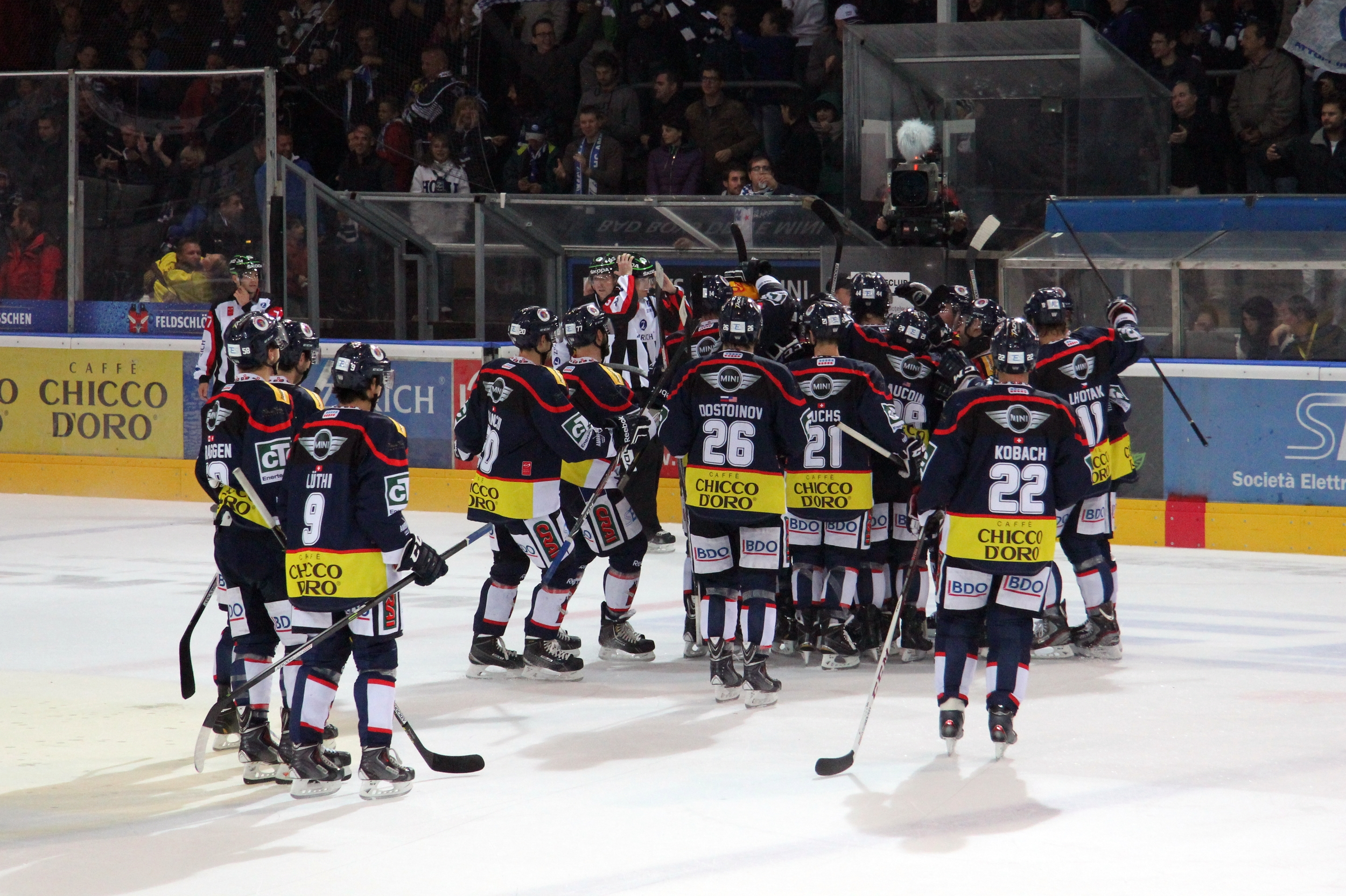
The team on the ice in 2014

=== Domestic ===
National League

- (silver) Runners-up (1): 1998–99

Swiss Cup

- (gold) Winners (1): 1962

=== International ===
IIHF Continental Cup

- (gold) Winners (2): 1998–99, 1999–2000

IIHF Super Cup

- (gold) Winners (1): 1999
- (silver) Runners-up (1): 2000

=== Invitational ===
Spengler Cup

- (gold) Winners (1): 2022

Basler Cup

- (bronze) (2): 1953, 1959

== Players ==
=== Current roster ===
Updated 28 October 2026.

No.	Nat	Player	Pos	S/G	Age	Acquired	Birthplace
21	(Switzerland)	Luc Bachmann	D	L	21	2025	
11	(Switzerland)	Nathan Borradori (A)	F	L	20	2026	
73	(Switzerland)	David Bosson	RW	R	20	2026	Marly, Switzerland
88	(Italy)	Tommaso De Luca (C)	C	L	21	2023	Aosta, Italy
7	(Switzerland)	Isacco Dotti	D	L	33	2018	Mairengo, Switzerland
27	(Switzerland)	Zaccheo Dotti	D	L	32	2020	Mairengo, Switzerland
61	(Switzerland)	Jordan Forget	RW	R	20	2026	Trois-Rivières, Quebec, Canada
12	(Switzerland)	Daniele Grassi	RW	R	33	2020	Bellinzona, Switzerland
96	(Switzerland)	Aris Häfliger	D	L	21	2026	
67	(Norway)	William Hedlund	C/RW	R	24	2024	Piteå, Sweden
72	(Sweden)	Tim Heed	D	R	35	2022	Gothenburg, Sweden
44	(Switzerland)	André Heim	C/RW	L	28	2021	Interlaken, Switzerland
31	(Switzerland)	Nassim Jaafri-Hayani	G	L	20	2026	Geneva, Switzerland
34	(Finland)	Roby Järventie	W	L	24	2026	Tampere, Finland
77	(Canada)	Michael Joly	RW	L	31	2025	Gatineau, Quebec, Canada
91	(Czech Republic)	Petr Kodýtek	C	L	28	2026	Susice, Czechia
37	(Canada)	Lukas Landry	C	L	21	2025	Gatineau, Quebec, Canada
13	(Canada)	Manix Landry	C	L	23	2023	Salt Lake City, Utah, United States
43	(Switzerland)	Tim Muggli	F	R	23	2024	Cham, Switzerland
17	(Switzerland)	Miles Müller	C	L	21	2024	Biel, Switzerland
18	(Switzerland)	Inti Pestoni	LW	L	35	2021	Faido, Switzerland
86	(Switzerland)	Rocco Pezzullo	D	L	25	2019	Verzasca, Switzerland
76	(Canada)	Nate Schnarr (A)	F	R	27	2026	Waterloo, Ontario, Canada
90	(Switzerland)	Gilles Senn	G	L	30	2024	Bülach, Switzerland
26	(Switzerland)	Simone Terraneo	D	L	22	2022	Biasca, Switzerland
71	(Finland)	Jesse Virtanen	D	L	35	2022	Rauma, Finland
14	(Sweden)	William Worge Kreü	D	L	26	2026	Linköping, Sweden
59	(Switzerland)	Dario Wüthrich	D	R	27	2022	Trub, Switzerland
30	(Switzerland)	Philip Wüthrich	G	L	28	2025	Bern, Switzerland

=== NHL alumni ===
- Richard Park
- Marco Baron
- Andy Bathgate
- Paul DiPietro
- Hnat Domenichelli
- Pauli Jaks
- Kim Johnsson
- Valeri Kamensky
- Larry Kwong
- Andreas Lilja
- Ryan Malone
- Dale McCourt
- Oleg Petrov
- Róbert Petrovický
- Leif Rohlin
- Jean-Guy Trudel
- Erik Westrum
- Matt Duchene
- Max Pacioretty
- Cory Schneider
- Maxim Noreau
- Scottie Upshall
- Dominik Kubalík
- Adam Hall
- Don Laurence
- Mike Kaszycki
- Alex Formenton
