= Airolo-Quinto =

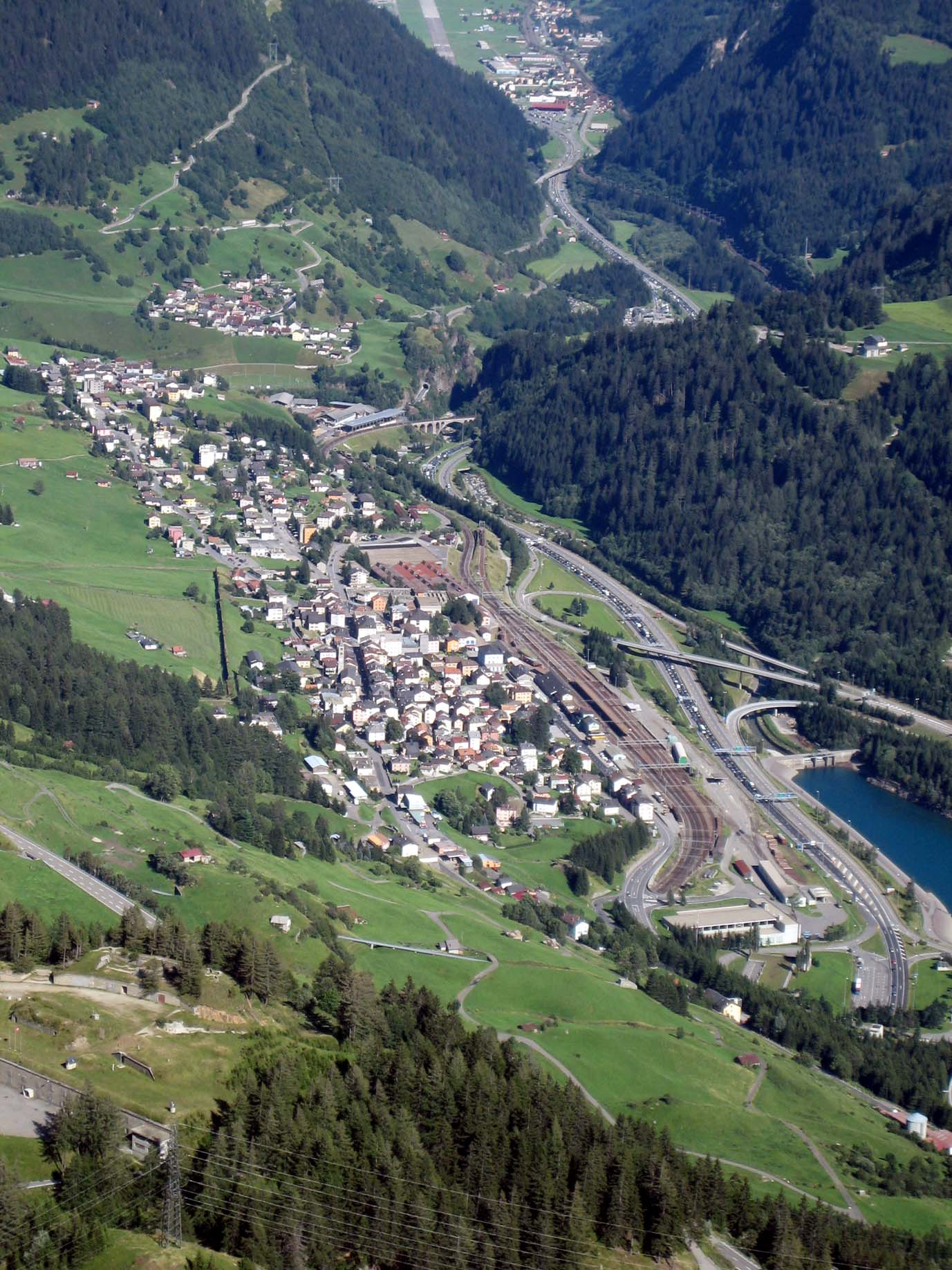
Airolo

Airolo-Quinto is the name of a planned municipality in Ticino, Switzerland.

The new municipality would be formed from the existing municipalities of Airolo and Quinto. A merger date has not yet been determined.
