= Lago di Tom =

Lake in Ticino, Switzerland

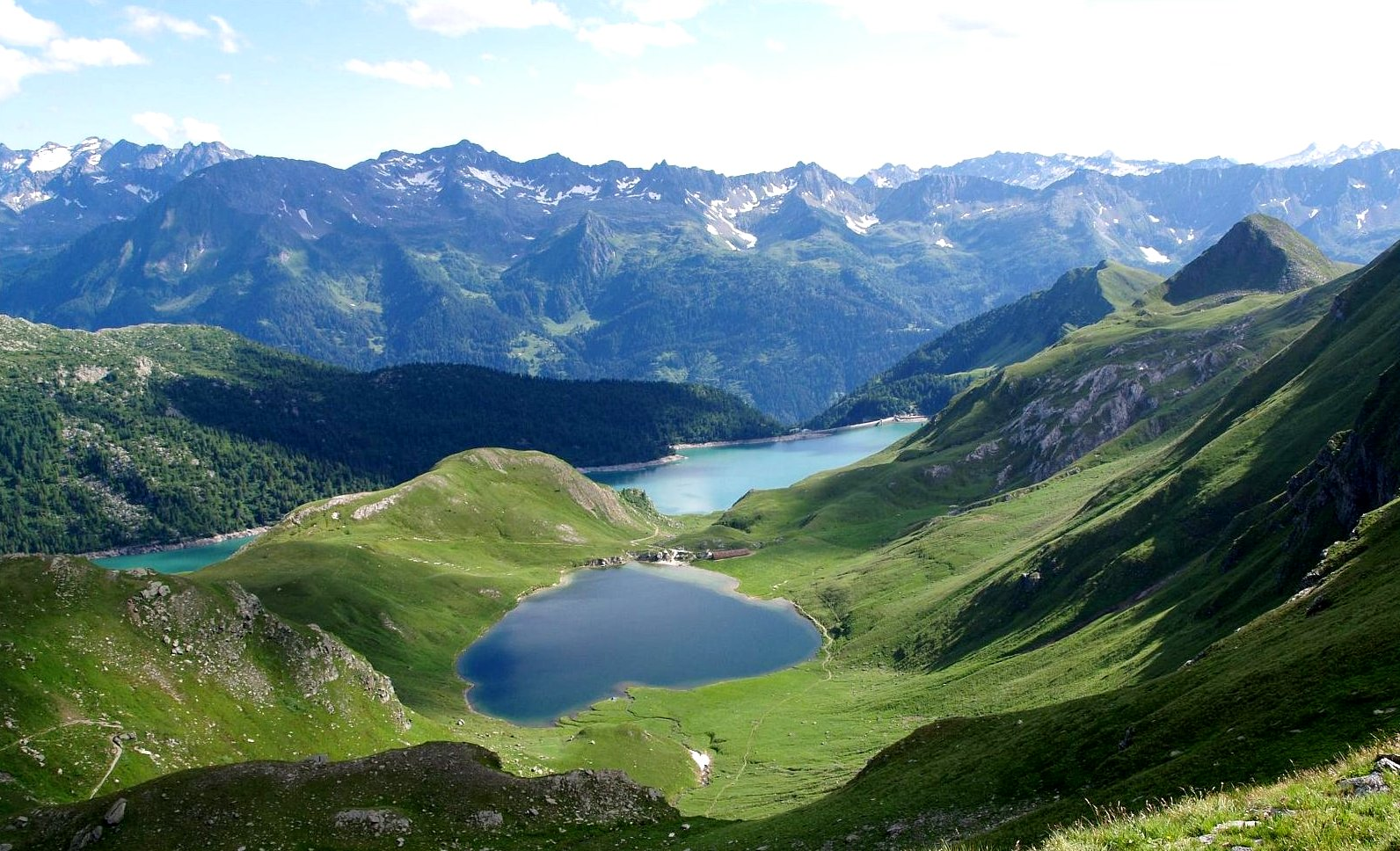
- Lago di Tom with Lago Ritom in the background

- Location within Canton of Ticino Location within Switzerland Location within Alps
- Interactive map of Lago di Tom
- Location: Piora Valley, Ticino
- Coordinates: 46°33′02″N 8°41′22″E
- Basin countries: Switzerland
- Surface area: 13 ha (32 acres)
- Surface elevation: 2,021 m (6,631 ft)

Lago di Tom is a lake in the Piora Valley, in the canton of Ticino, Switzerland. Its surface area is 13 ha (32 acres).

It is located at an altitude of 2,021m, reaching above the tree line.

== See also ==
- List of mountain lakes of Switzerland
