= Ritom funicular =

Funicular railway in the north of the canton of Ticino, Switzerland

Coordinates: 46.517074°N 8.67524°E

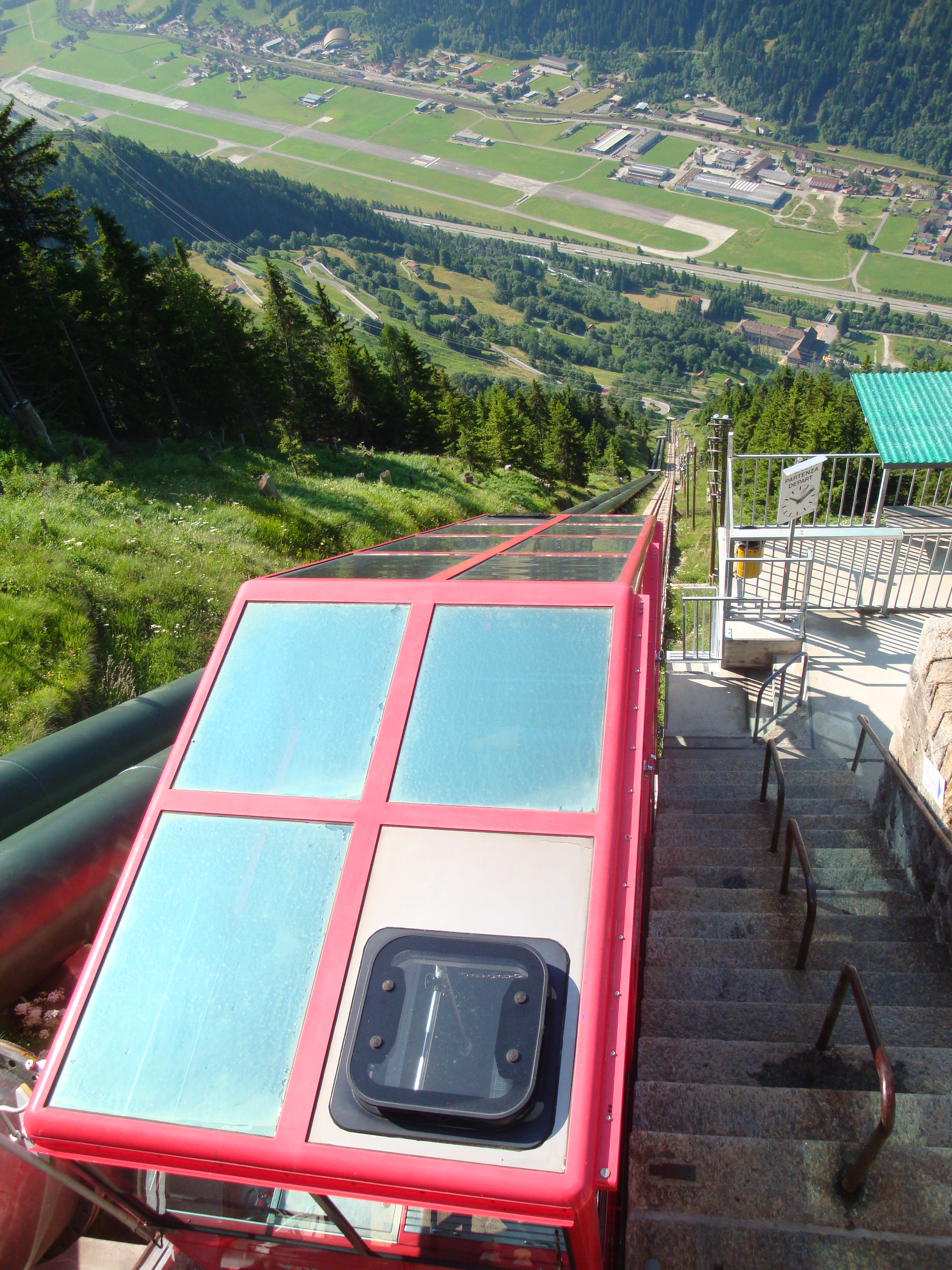
- Looking down the Ritom funicular

Overview
- Other name: Funicolare del Ritom
- Status: in operation
- Locale: Ticino, Switzerland
- Termini: "Piotta Centrale (funicolare)"; "Piora"
- Stations: 3 (including Altanca (funicolare))

Service
- Type: funicular
- Rolling stock: 1

History
- Opened: 21 July 1921; 104 years ago (open to public)

Technical
- Track length: 1,369 metres (4,491 ft)
- Track gauge: 1,000 mm (3 ft 3 3/8 in)
- Electrification: from opening
- Maximum incline: 87.8%

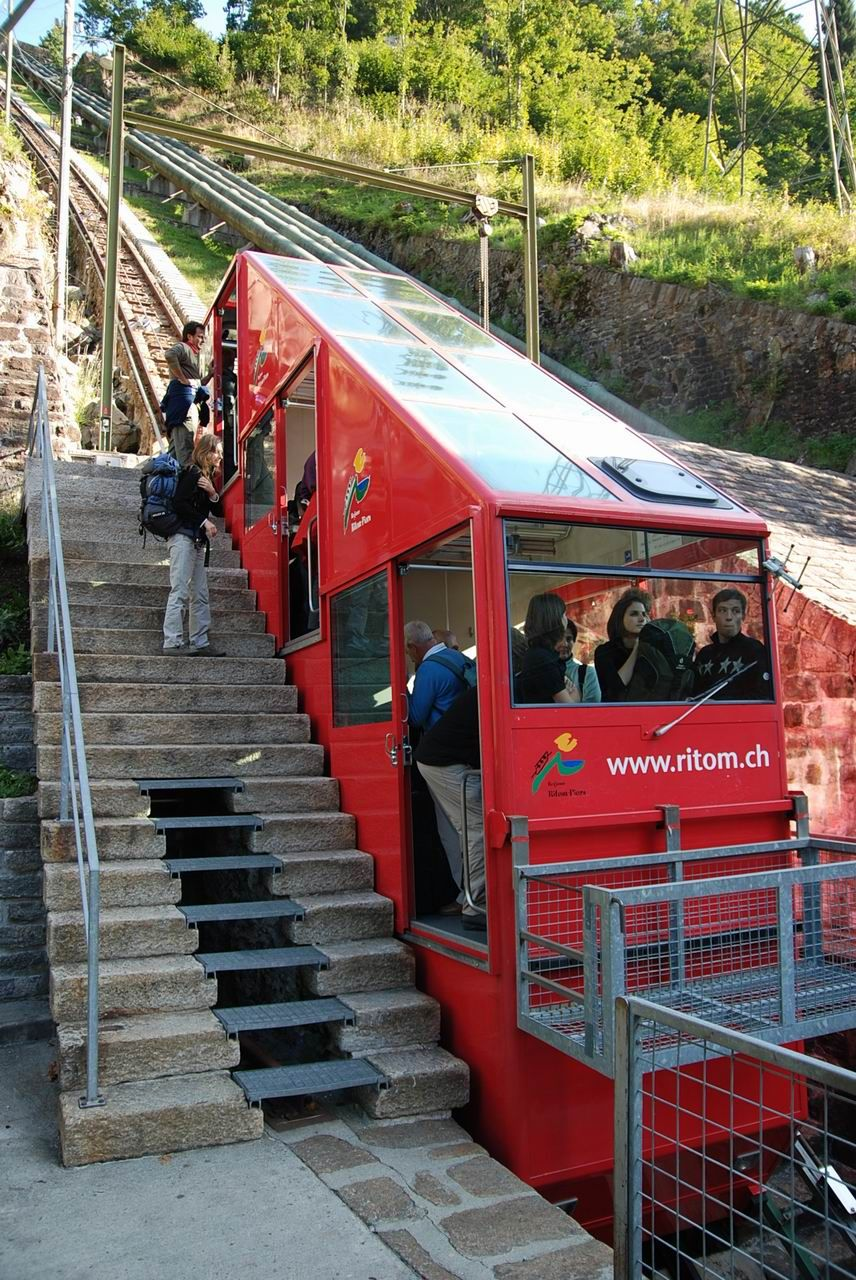
The funicular car

The Ritom funicular (Italian: Funicolare del Ritom) is a funicular railway in the canton of Ticino, Switzerland. It links a lower terminus at Piotta, in the valley of the Ticino River near the southern portal of the Gotthard Tunnel, with an upper terminus at Piora, a 1 kilometre (0.62 mi) walk from Ritom Lake. There is also an intermediate stop at Altanca.

== History ==
The Ritom Lake is in fact a reservoir, constructed in 1917 in order collect the waters of the Saint-Gotthard Massif for a power station at Piotta, in order to produce electricity for the Gotthard railway. The funicular was originally constructed to facilitate the building of the pipeline carrying this water, which it parallels, but was opened for public use in 1921.

The line was extensively rebuilt in 1977/8, and the original car was replaced by a new one in 1985. The original car, replaced in 1985, is displayed at the lower station.

At its opening, and until the opening of the Gelmerbahn funicular, the Ritom funicular was the steepest funicular in Switzerland.

== Operation ==
The line has the following parameters:

Feature	Value
Number of cars	1
Number of stops	3 (Piotta, Altanca, Piora)
Configuration	Single track
Track length	1,369 metres (4,491 ft)
Rise	785 metres (2,575 ft)
Maximum gradient	87.8%
Track gauge	1,000 mm (3 ft 3 3/8 in)
Speed	2.7 metres per second (8.9 ft/s)
Journey time	12 mins
Capacity	50 passengers per car; 100 persons in each direction per hour

== See also ==
- List of funicular railways
- List of funiculars in Switzerland
