= Piotta, Switzerland =

Piotta
- Village
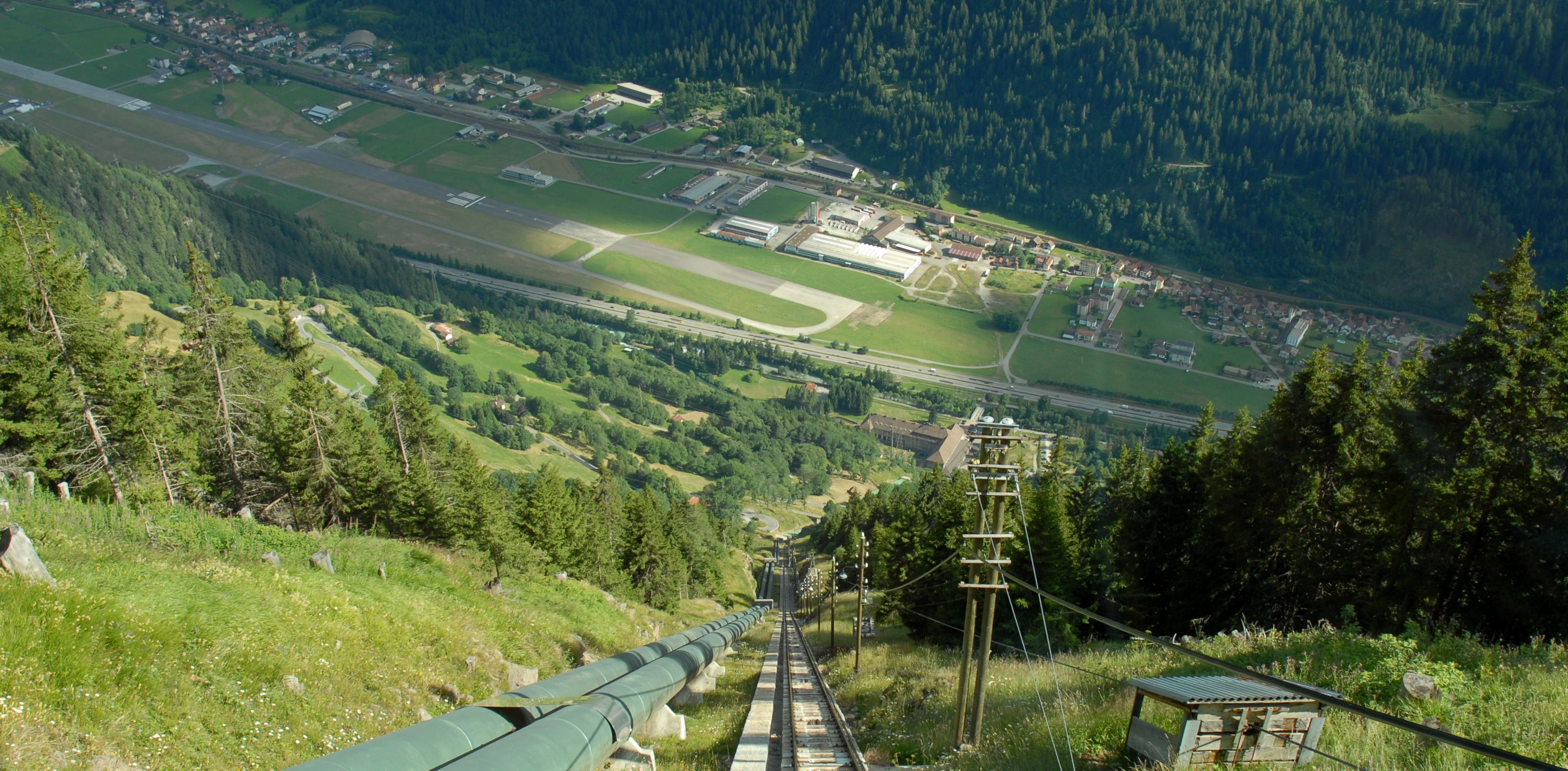
- Piotta and Ambrì Airport seen from the Ritom funicular

- Rodi in Switzerland
- Coordinates: 46°30′59″N 8°40′30″E
- Country: Switzerland
- Canton: Ticino
- District: Leventina
- Municipality: Quinto
- Elevation: 1,006 m (3,301 ft)

Population (2001)
  - Total: 1,006
- Time zone: UTC+1 (CET)
  - Summer (DST): UTC+2 (CEST)
- Postal code: 6776
- Area code: (+41) 091
- Licence plate: TI

Piotta is a village in the municipality of Quinto in the Swiss canton of Ticino.

== Geography ==
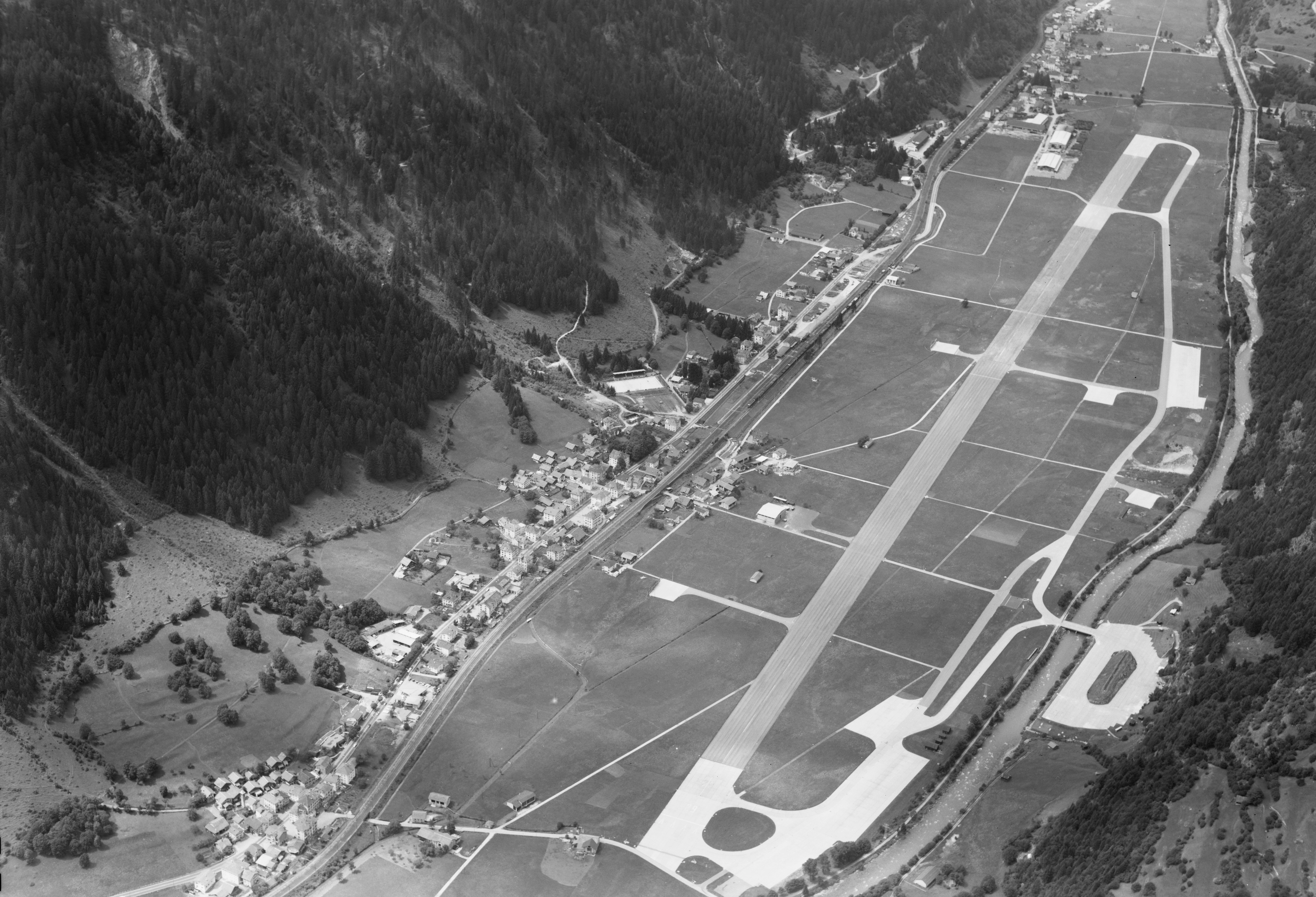
Aerial view (1964)

The village, located next to the neighbouring Ambrì, lies in the Leventina Valley, below the Lepontine Alps, and is crossed in the middle by Ticino river. It is 3 km far from Quinto, 5 from Airolo and 52 from Bellinzona.

== Transport ==
Piotta is the location of the base station of the Ritom funicular, linking the village to Ritom Lake. Along with the neighbouring village of Ambrì, Piotta is served by the infrequently served Ambrì-Piotta railway station on the Gotthard railway, and is located close to Ambri Airport.

== Sport ==
The village hosts the professional ice hockey team HC Ambrì-Piotta, that plays in indoor sporting arena of "Valascia", located in Ambrì.

== Climate ==
Climate data for Piotta, elevation 990 m (3,250 ft), (1991–2020)
Month	Jan	Feb	Mar	Apr	May	Jun	Jul	Aug	Sep	Oct	Nov	Dec	Year
Mean daily maximum °C (°F)	2.4 (36.3)	4.6 (40.3)	9.1 (48.4)	12.9 (55.2)	17.0 (62.6)	21.4 (70.5)	23.5 (74.3)	22.7 (72.9)	18.0 (64.4)	13.0 (55.4)	6.7 (44.1)	2.7 (36.9)	12.8 (55.0)
Daily mean °C (°F)	−1.2 (29.8)	0.2 (32.4)	4.1 (39.4)	7.7 (45.9)	11.9 (53.4)	15.8 (60.4)	17.7 (63.9)	17.0 (62.6)	13.0 (55.4)	8.4 (47.1)	3.1 (37.6)	−0.5 (31.1)	8.1 (46.6)
Mean daily minimum °C (°F)	−4.9 (23.2)	−4.1 (24.6)	−0.5 (31.1)	2.7 (36.9)	6.6 (43.9)	10.1 (50.2)	12.0 (53.6)	11.7 (53.1)	8.2 (46.8)	4.2 (39.6)	−0.3 (31.5)	−3.9 (25.0)	3.5 (38.3)
Average precipitation mm (inches)	71.1 (2.80)	53.7 (2.11)	75.8 (2.98)	122.5 (4.82)	146.8 (5.78)	154.3 (6.07)	128.4 (5.06)	158.4 (6.24)	151.6 (5.97)	157.9 (6.22)	155.2 (6.11)	80.7 (3.18)	1,456.4 (57.34)
Average snowfall cm (inches)	56.6 (22.3)	47.8 (18.8)	21.3 (8.4)	10.1 (4.0)	0.5 (0.2)	0.0 (0.0)	0.0 (0.0)	0.0 (0.0)	0.0 (0.0)	2.9 (1.1)	22.5 (8.9)	56.5 (22.2)	243.8 (96.0)
Average precipitation days (≥ 1.0 mm)	8.1	6.7	7.5	9.3	11.6	10.5	9.8	11.5	8.4	9.1	10.0	8.3	110.8
Average relative humidity (%)	72.4	65.7	61.2	61.2	65.0	65.2	65.4	70.0	72.9	76.7	75.6	73.8	68.8
Source: NOAA
