= Ambri Airport =

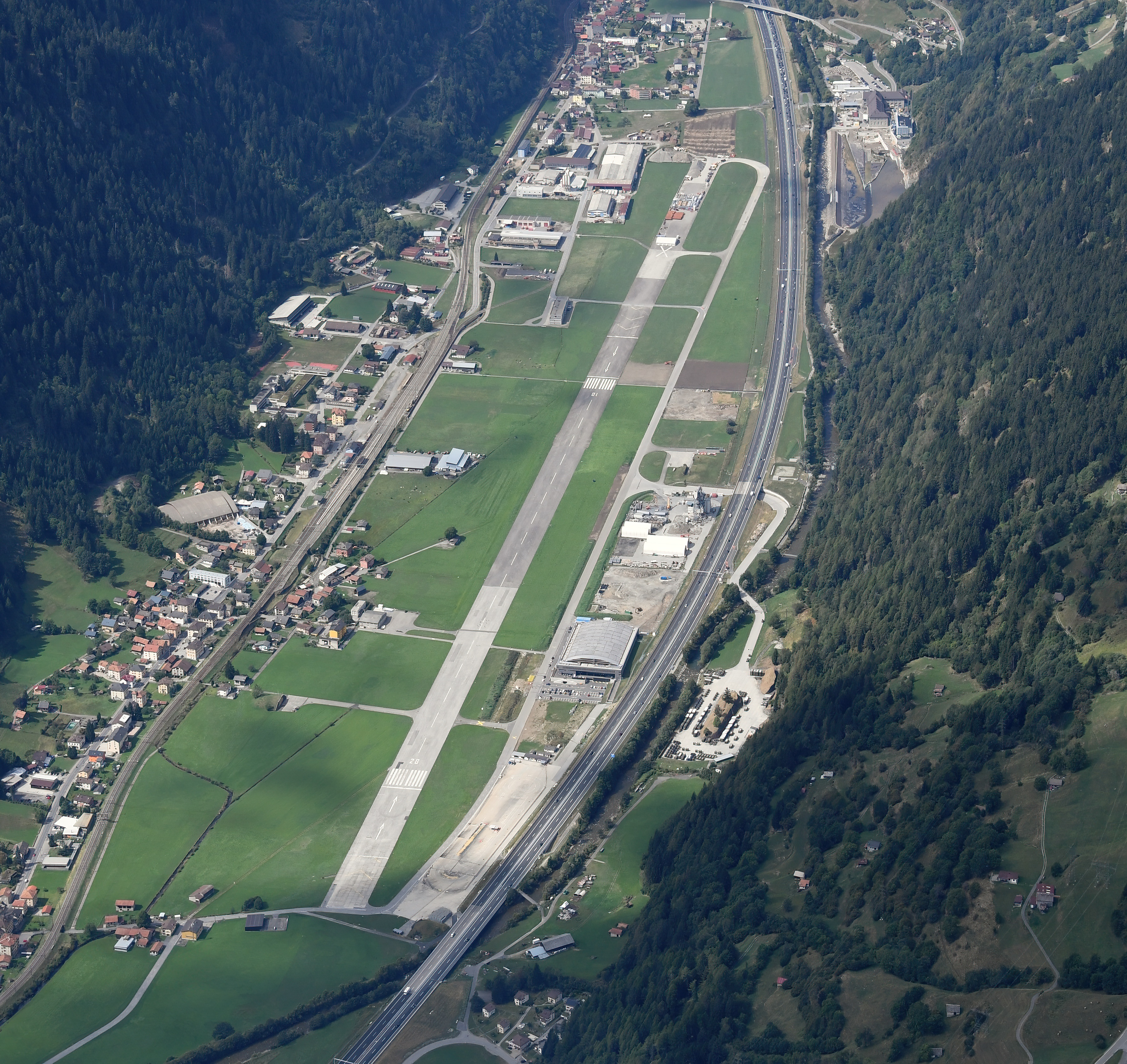
- Aerial view of the airport
- IATA: none; ICAO: LSPM

Summary
- Airport type: Private
- Location: Quinto
- Elevation AMSL: 3,214 ft / 980 m
- Coordinates: 46°30′47″N 8°41′22″E
- Website: www.ambri-airport.com
- Interactive map of Ambri Airport

Runways
Direction	Length		Surface
Direction	ft	m	Surface
11/29	6,529	1,990	Asphalt
- Sources: Ambri Airport official website

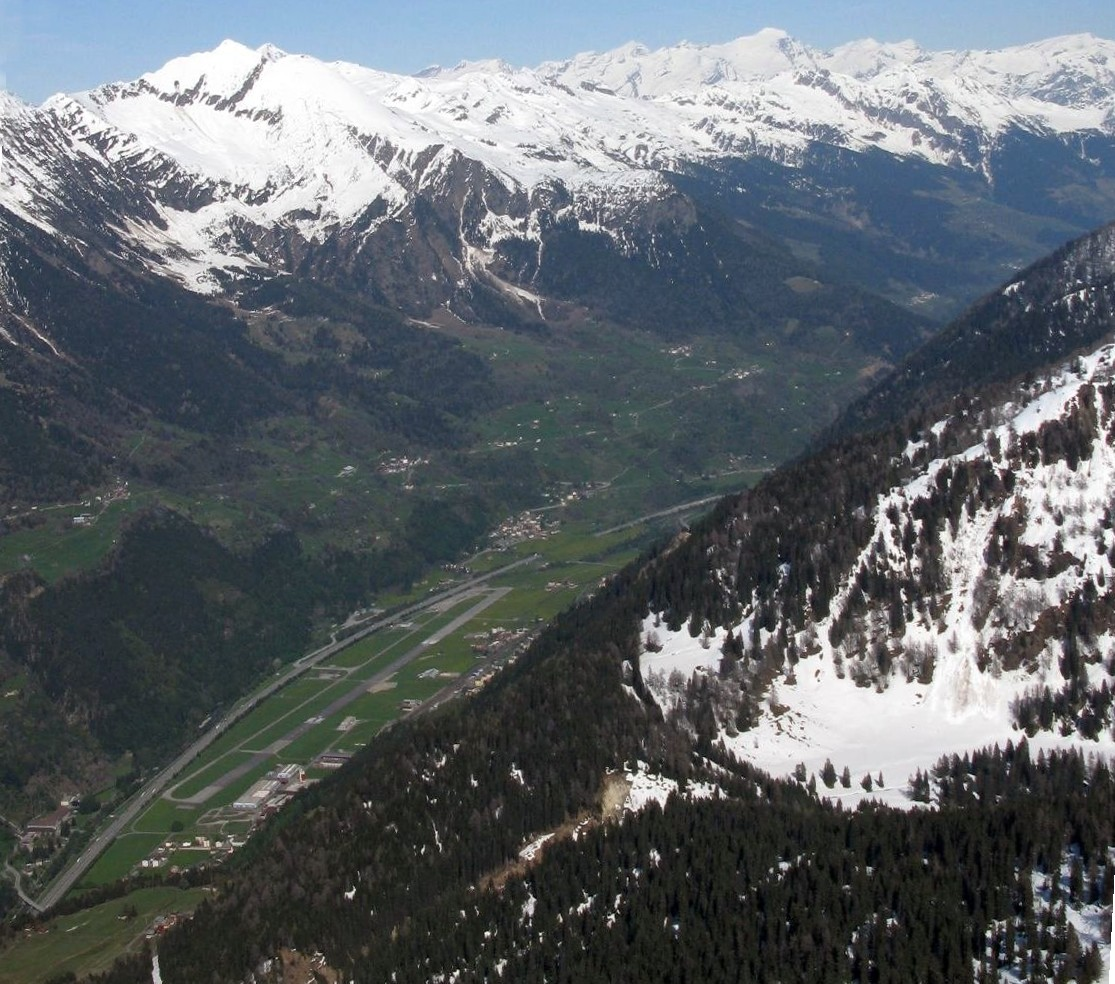
Ambri Airport in the valley of the Ticino River, as seen from the west

Ambri Airport (Note: German: Flughafen Ambri, French: Aéroport de Ambri, Italian: Aeroporto di Ambrì) (ICAO: LSPM) is a Swiss general aviation airport. It located near the village of Ambrì, in the municipality of Quinto, canton of Ticino. Ambri serves the surrounding area and is home to a gliding school, a helicopter base and has sufficiency for VFR flying.

The airport is situated in the steep-sided alpine valley of the Ticino river. It is flanked to the north by the A2 motorway and the river, and to the south by the Gotthard railway and the villages of Ambri and Piotta.

== History ==
Ambri Airport began as a Swiss Air Force base, built during World War II. It was home to the Fighter Squadron 8, whose fleet included the EKW C-35, Messerschmitt Bf 109, de Havilland Vampire, de Havilland Venom and the Hawker Hunter.

The mountains surrounding the airport housed bunkers of which were home to tactical buildings, fighter aircraft and troops. The bunkers were accessed by taxiways that passed under the A2 motorway, and over the Ticino river.

In 1994 the Swiss Air Force base was deactivated, and the airfield converted into a civilian airport. The Aircraft cavern that formerly accommodated the base still exists but are now empty.

== See also ==
- Military significance of Switzerlands Motorways
- Aircraft cavern
