= Lago Ritom =

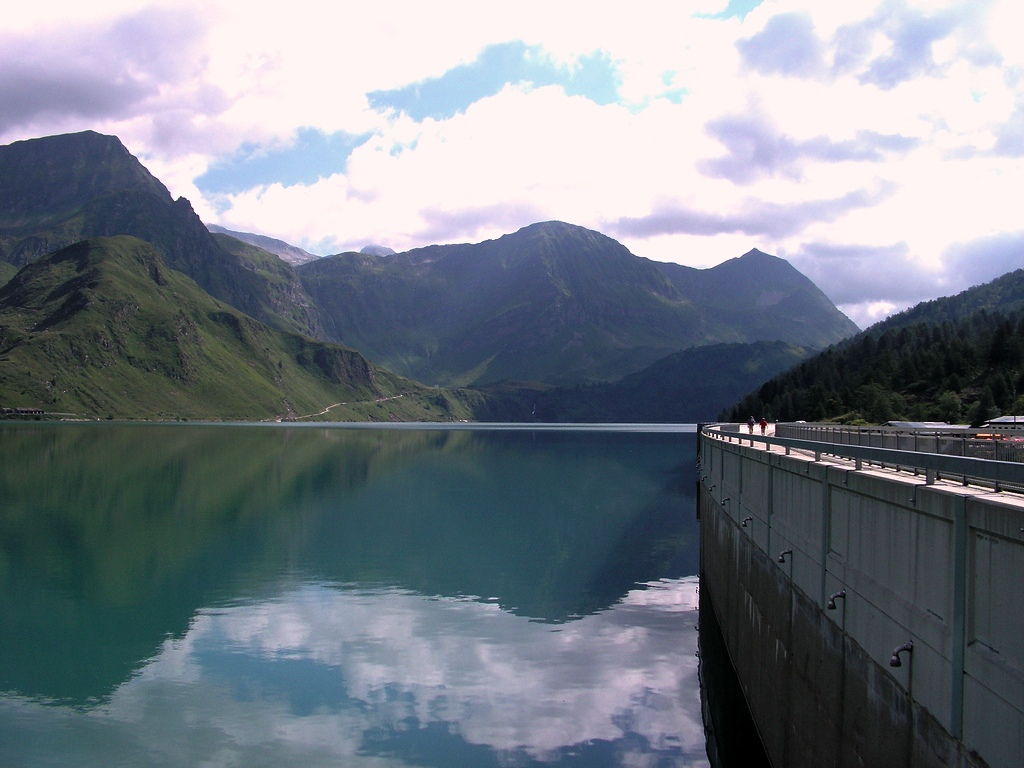

- Location within Canton of Ticino Location within Switzerland Location within Alps
- Interactive map of Lago Ritom
- Location: Piora Valley, Ticino
- Coordinates: 46°32′24″N 8°41′21″E
- Type: reservoir, natural lake
- Basin countries: Switzerland
- Surface area: 1.49 km^{2} (0.58 sq mi)
- Max. depth: 69 m (226 ft)
- Water volume: 48 million cubic metres (39,000 acre⋅ft)
- Surface elevation: 1,850 m (6,070 ft)

Lago Ritom is a lake in the Piora valley, Ticino, Switzerland. The natural lake is used as a reservoir by the Swiss Federal Railways (SBB-CFF-FFS) to generate hydro-electric power for the Gotthard line. The first dam was built in 1918 and, in 1950, its height was increased by 23 m.

== Overview ==
The lake's surface area is 1.49 km^{2} at an elevation of 1850 m. With Lake Cadagno and Lago di Tom, it is one of the main lakes in the Piora valley.

Before being used as a reservoir, Lake Ritom was a meromictic lake similar to the nearby Lake Cadagno.

== Transport ==
The lake can be reached by funicular from Piotta 786 m below. The track with a length of 1,369 m has a maximum inclination of 87.8%, the highest in Europe after the Gelmerbahn funicular (106%).

== See also ==
- List of lakes of Switzerland
- List of mountain lakes of Switzerland
