= List of mountain lakes of Switzerland =

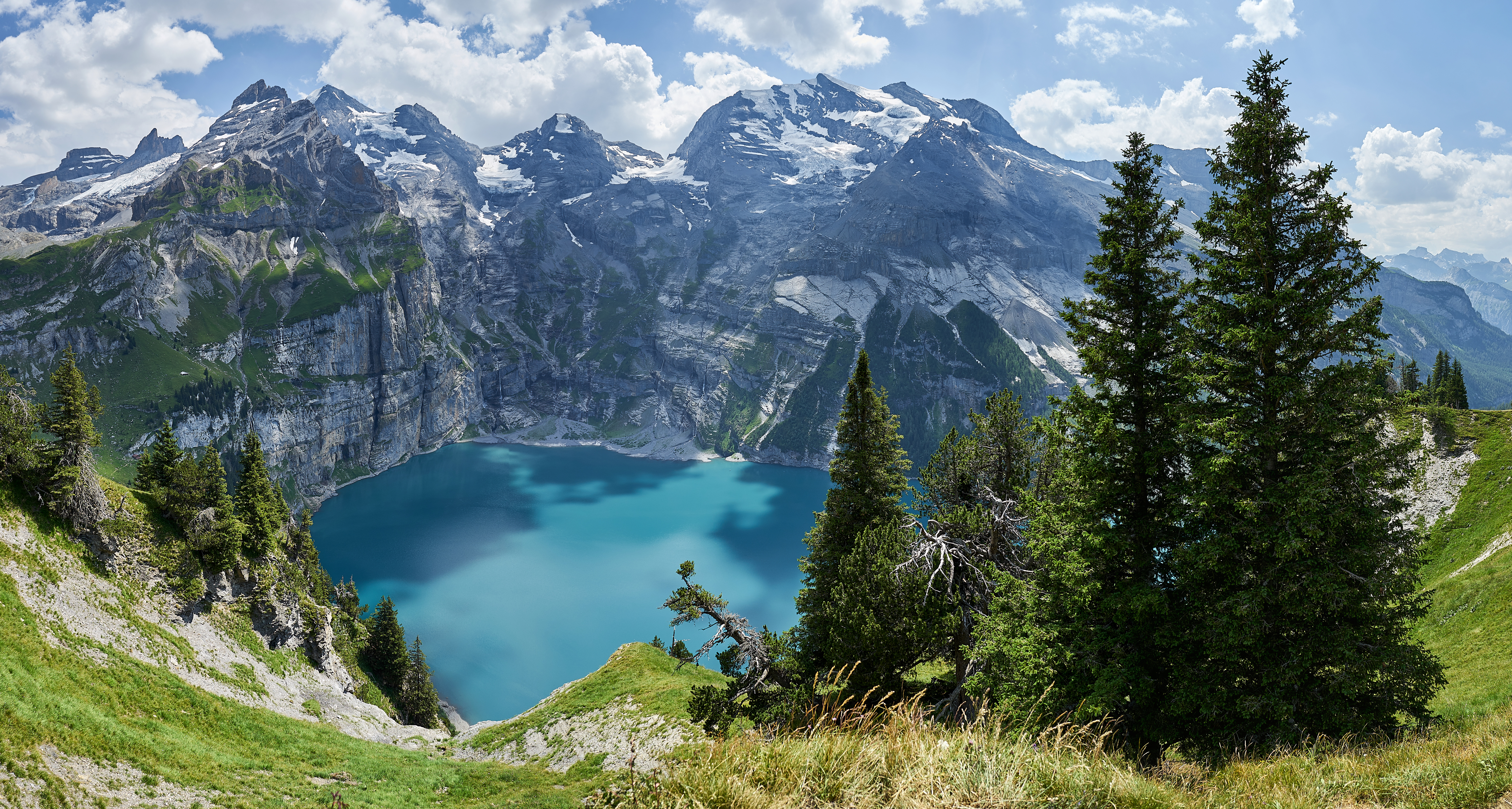
The Alpine lake of Oeschinen, overlooked by the Blüemlisalp and the Doldenhorn

This is a list of high-altitude lakes of Switzerland. It includes all significant lakes located either entirely or partly in Switzerland, both natural and artificial, with an area of at least 4 ha (9.9 acres) and a location at over 800 m (2,600 ft) above sea level. This altitude approximately corresponds to the transition between the foothill zone and the montane zone in both the Alps and the Jura Mountains, the two mountainous areas of Switzerland.

Lakes can be found up to elevations of almost 3,000 m (9,800 ft), the climatic snow line in the Alps. For each lake, the culminating point of the drainage basin is indicated, along with the river basin of which it is part.

== Distribution of mountain lakes by canton ==
Distribution of the lakes over 4 ha by canton and altitude
Canton	800-1199m	1200- 1599m	1600- 1999m	2000- 2399m	2400m+	Total (800m+)
Appenzell I.	1	2	0	0	0	3
Bern	0	5	10	6	1	22
Fribourg	2	0	0	0	0	2
Glarus	2	2	2	0	1	7
Graubünden	7	7	18	12	20	64
Jura	1	0	0	0	0	1
Neuchâtel	1	0	0	0	0	1
Nidwalden	0	1	1	0	0	2
Obwalden	1	0	4	0	0	5
Schwyz	2	1	1	0	0	4
St. Gallen	4	1	2	0	1	8
Ticino	2	1	10	19	3	35
Uri	0	2	3	4	0	9
Valais	0	8	6	20	15	49
Vaud	3	1	3	0	0	7
Switzerland	26	31	59	61	40	217

== Main list ==
Lake	Canton(s)	Elevation in m	Area in ha	Basin highest point	Basin highest elevation in m	River basin
Theodulgletschersee	Valais	2851	7.76	Theodulhorn	3469	Rhone
Lai d'Immez	Graubünden	2832	4.53	Piz d'Immez	3033	Danube
Lej da la Prüna	Graubünden	2815	4.03	West of Piz Pischa	3080	Danube
Lej da la Pischa	Graubünden	2770	5.05	Piz Pischa	3138	Danube
Chaltwassersee	Valais	2756	4.41	Monte Leone	3553	Rhone
Plaine Morte	Valais	2752	11.4	Schneehorn	3178	Rhone
Vadret Lagrev	Graubünden	2721	6.31	Northeast of Piz Lagrev	3109	Danube
Lai Verd	Graubünden	2702	4.50	Piz Gannaretsch	3040	Rhine
Chüebodengletscher	Ticino/Valais	2671	6.8	Chüebodenhorn	3070	Rhone
Lac du Grand Désert	Valais	2642	5.98	Rosablanche	3336	Rhone
Lac de Lona	Valais	2640	6.32	Sasseneire	3254	Rhone
Lej Alv	Graubünden	2639	4.19	Piz da Lej Alv	3197	Danube
Lej Sgrischus	Graubünden	2616	5.60	South of Piz Corvatsch	3335	Danube
Lej da la Tscheppa	Graubünden	2616	7.89	East of Piz Lagrev	3070	Danube
Gornersee	Valais	2599	4.13	Monte Rosa	4634	Rhone
Lai Grond	Graubünden	2594	6.00	Piz Ela	3339	Rhine
Distelsee	Valais	2587	4.95	Ritzberge	2862	Rhone
Laghet la Greina	Graubünden	2585	18.78	Piz Terri	3149	Rhine
Trützisee	Valais	2579	4.41	Löffelhorn	3096	Rhone
Le Louché	Valais	2567	5.00	Becs de Bosson	3149	Rhone
Grand Lé	Valais	2554	4.06	Monts Telliers	2951	Rhone
Lac des Vaux	Valais	2543	11.28	Mont Gelé	3023	Rhone
Lej Alv	Graubünden	2543	5.23	Piz Nair	3056	Danube
Jöriseen (east lake)	Graubünden	2519	5.69	Flüela Wisshorn	3085	Rhine
Lai Ghiacciato	Graubünden	2508	4.02	Piz Ursaregls	2835	Rhine
Lai da Ravais-ch	Graubünden	2505	9.12	Piz Murtelet	3019	Rhine
Jöriseen (main lake)	Graubünden	2489	9.36	Flüela Wisshorn	3085	Rhine
Lägh dal Lunghin	Graubünden	2484	5.16	Piz Grevasalvas	2932	Danube
Schottensee	Graubünden	2469	6.15	Gross Seehorn	3122	Rhine
Lägh da la Duana	Graubünden	2466	5.86	Piz Duan	3131	Po
Bortelsee	Valais	2464	13.65	West of Bortelhorn	2986	Rhone
Lac des Audannes	Valais	2453	8.45	Wildhorn	3248	Rhone
Hüenersee	Graubünden	2453	4.14	Plattenspitzen	2852	Rhine
Lago Scuro	Ticino	2451	7.42	Punta Negra	2714	Rhine
Muttsee	Glarus	2446	41.02	Ruchi	3107	Rhine
Laghi d'Orsirora (main lake)	Ticino	2444	4.29	Pizzo d'Orsirora	2603	Rhine
Geisspfadsee	Valais	2439	11.48	Gross Schinhorn	2939	Rhone
Pizolseen (Wildsee)	St. Gallen	2438	6.87	Pizol	2844	Rhine
Lai Blau	Graubünden	2409	5.50	East of Piz Lai Blau	2920	Rhine
Tälliseeli	Bern	2405	6.33	Steghorn	3146	Rhine
Lai da Rims	Graubünden	2396	14.28	Piz Umbrail	3033	Adige
Lago Sfundau	Ticino	2392	13.73	Cristallina	2912	Po
Lago Barone	Ticino	2391	6.87	Pizzo Barone	2864	Po
Leg Grevalsalvas	Graubünden	2390	7.34	Piz Lagrev	3165	Rhine
Lago Nero	Ticino	2387	13.34	Pizzo del Ghiacciaio di Sasso Nero	2842	Po
Griessee	Valais	2386	63.69	Blinnenhorn	3374	Rhone
Lai da la Scotta	Graubünden	2376	8.25	Flüela Schwarzhorn	3146	Rhine
Lac des Dix	Valais	2365	399.93	Mont Blanc de Cheilon	3870	Rhone
Triebtenseewli	Bern	2365	9.66	Gross Sidelhorn	2879	Rhine
Laghi Chiera (main lake)	Ticino	2361	9.55	Pizzo del Sole	2773	Po
Ober Meretschisee	Valais	2361	4.24	Bella Tola	3025	Rhone
Illsee	Valais	2360	20.89	Rothorn	2998	Rhone
Märjelen-Stausee	Valais	2360	6.32	North of Strahlhorn	3050	Rhone
Lago dello Stabbio	Ticino	2351	8.36	Pizzo Taneda	2668	Po
Gross See	Uri	2337	4.30	East of Spitzli	2700	Rhine
Gruebengletscher	Bern	2334	8.26	Hiendertelltihorn	3179	Rhine
Vadret da Palü	Graubünden	2322	8.2	Piz Palü	3901	Po
Lago del Narèt	Ticino	2310	73.16	Cristallina	2912	Po
Lago dei Cavagnöö	Ticino	2310	47.64	Marchhorn	2962	Po
Unter Meretschisee	Valais	2307	4.33	Bella Tola	3025	Rhone
Oberaarsee	Bern	2303	162.69	Oberaarhorn	3631	Rhine
Lago di Dentro	Ticino	2298	6.47	West of Schenadüi	2678	Po
Lämmerensee	Valais	2296	6.74	South of Rote Totz	2829	Rhine
Albulasee	Graubünden	2294	4.2	Piz Üertsch	3267	Danube
Lago d'Orsino	Ticino	2286	4.41	Southwest of Pizzo d'Orsino	2629	Rhine
Ober Surettasee	Graubünden	2266	5.49	Äussere Schwarzhörner	2855	Rhine
Bachalpsee	Bern	2265	8.03	Reeti	2757	Rhine
Lago di Morghirolo	Ticino	2264	12.16	Tre Corni	2953	Po
Lago della Sella	Ticino	2256	45.08	Pizzo Centrale	2999	Po
Lac de Moiry	Valais	2249	130.96	North of Grand Cornier	3845	Rhone
Lago Bianco	Graubünden	2234	143.19	Piz Cambrena	3606	Po
Lej Nair	Graubünden	2223	8.72	West of Piz Lagalb	2840	Danube
Lac de Louvie	Valais	2214	11.39	Mont Fort	3329	Rhone
Daubensee	Valais	2205	63.83	Rinderhorn	3448	Rhine
Lac du Vieux Emosson	Valais	2205	54.56	Pointe de la Finive	2838	Rhone
Mattmarksee	Valais	2197	174.14	Rimpfischhorn	4199	Rhone
Laghetti d'Antabia (main lake)	Ticino	2189	7.93	Pizzo Solögna	2698	Po
Lac de Cleuson	Valais	2186	47.89	Rosablanche	3336	Rhone
Turtmannsee	Valais	2177	9.84	Bishorn	4153	Rhone
Tschawinersee	Valais	2174	6.45	Tschawinerhorn	2496	Po
Lägh da l'Albigna	Graubünden	2163	125.81	Cima di Castello	3379	Po
Lej da Vadret	Graubünden	2160	42.9	Piz Roseg	3937	Danube
Totensee	Valais	2160	19.35	Sidelhorn	2764	Rhone
Lago di Val Viola	Graubünden	2159	8.39	Piz Paradisin	3302	Po
Lago della Crosa	Ticino	2153	17.37	Pizzo Fiorèra	2921	Po
Gauligletscher	Bern	2146	28.3	Bärglistock	3656	Rhine
Moosjisee	Valais	2139	5.036	Strahlhorn	4190	Findel Glacier
Lago di Lucendro	Ticino	2135	54.27	Pizzo Lucendro	2963	Rhine
Lac de Fully	Valais	2128	20.39	Dent de Morcles	2969	Rhone
Lago Superiore	Ticino	2128	8.51	Pizzo del Lago Scuro	2648	Po
Laghi della Crosa (east lake)	Ticino	2116	9.03	Pizzo Fiorèra	2921	Po
Clariden Gletschersee	Uri	2098	7.8	Clariden	3267	Rhine
Chummibort	Valais	2097	4.81	Helsenhorn	3272	Rhone
Lago di Sassolo	Ticino	2074	5.56	Pizzo del Lago Scuro	2648	Po
Iffigsee	Bern	2065	10.19	Wildhorn	3248	Rhine
Laghetto Moesola	Graubünden	2062	5.73	East of Marscholhorn	2660	Po
Seewlisee	Uri	2028	8.69	Gross Windgällen	3187	Rhine
Oberalpsee	Uri	2027	18.59	Piz Tiarms	2918	Rhine
Lac de Sanetsch	Valais	2024	28.42	Arpelistock	3036	Rhine
Lago di Tom	Ticino	2022	9.26	South of Punta Negra	2688	Po
Bettmersee	Valais	2009	6.10	Hohbalm	2431	Rhone
Lago di Mognola	Ticino	2003	5.87	Tre Corni	2953	Po
Tannensee	Obwalden	1976	33.96	Rotsandnollen	2700	Rhine
Lac de Mauvoisin	Valais	1961	225.57	Grand Combin	4314	Rhone
Lai da Curnera	Graubünden	1956	79.39	Piz Blas	3019	Rhine
Lago di Robièi	Ticino	1940	24.61	Pizzo dell'Arzo	2755	Po
Lago del Zött	Ticino	1940	14.83	Basòdino	3272	Po
Sägistalsee	Bern	1937	7.25	Winteregg	2573	Rhine
Steinsee	Bern	1932	11.64	Sustenhorn	3503	Rhine
Lago di Lei	Graubünden	1931	404.51	Piz Timun	3209	Rhine
Lac d'Emosson	Valais	1930	321.44	Tour Sallière	3220	Rhone
Lac de Salanfe	Valais	1925	179.56	Dents du Midi	3257	Rhone
Lago Palü	Graubünden	1923	5.36	Piz Palü	3901	Po
Lago Cadagno	Ticino	1921	26.28	Pizzo Taneda	2668	Po
Lai da Palpuogna	Graubünden	1918	4.93	Igl Compass	3016	Rhine
Grimselsee	Bern	1908	268.80	Finsteraarhorn	4274	Rhine
Lai da Sontga Maria	Graubünden/Ticino	1908	177.35	Scopi	3190	Rhine
Lai da Nalps	Graubünden	1908	90.12	Piz Gannaretsch	3040	Rhine
Lägh da Cavloc	Graubünden	1907	10.08	Cima da Murtaira	2858	Po
Eisee	Obwalden	1896	4.50	East of Brienzer Rothorn	2260	Rhine
Melchsee	Obwalden	1891	50.70	Rotsandnollen	2700	Rhine
Mattenalpsee	Bern	1876	18.64	Bärglistock	3656	Rhine
Zervreilasee	Graubünden	1862	156.48	Rheinwaldhorn	3402	Rhine
Limmernsee	Glarus	1857	134.03	Bifertenstock	3419	Rhine
Glattalpsee	Schwyz	1855	27.65	Ortstock	2717	Rhine
Lago d'Alzasca	Ticino	1855	10.77	Pizzo Molinera	2292	Po
Engstlensee	Bern	1851	45.95	Wendenstock	3042	Rhine
Lago Tremorgio	Ticino	1851	39.84	Pizzo Campolungo	2713	Po
Lago Ritom	Ticino	1850	146.17	Pizzo del Sole	2773	Po
Gelmersee	Bern	1850	61.70	Diechterhorn	3389	Rhine
Lac Lioson	Vaud	1848	6.59	Châtillon	2478	Rhone
Spilauersee	Uri	1837	5.15	Rossstock	2461	Rhine
Seebergsee	Bern	1831	5.75	Muntiggalm	2077	Rhine
Ober Murgsee	St. Gallen	1820	19.67	Gufelstock	2436	Rhine
Sachsler Seefeld	Obwalden	1819	5.32	Abgschütz	2263	Rhine
Lac des Toules	Valais	1810	59.92	Mont Vélan	3727	Rhone
Lej da Staz	Graubünden	1809	4.19	La Crasta	2012	Danube
Lago di Livigno	Graubünden	1805	461.47	Piz Paradisin	3302	Danube
Lake Sils	Graubünden	1797	410.09	Piz Fora	3363	Danube
Göscheneralpsee	Uri	1792	130.46	Dammastock	3630	Rhine
Lake Silvaplana	Graubünden	1790	317.99	Piz Corvatsch	3451	Danube
Lac de Bretaye	Vaud	1780	4.47	Le Chamossaire	2112	Rhone
Lac de Tseuzier	Valais	1777	82.96	Wildhorn	3248	Rhone
Lake St. Moritz	Graubünden	1768	74.92	Piz Corvatsch	3451	Danube
Räterichsbodensee	Bern	1767	65.77	Finsteraarhorn	4274	Rhine
Trüebsee	Nidwalden	1764	27.11	Titlis	3238	Rhine
Lago di Chironico	Ticino	1763	15.38	Cima Bianca	2612	Po
Obersee	Graubünden	1734	7.98	Tschuggen	2049	Rhine
Lago di Tomeo	Ticino	1692	6.04	Monte Zucchero	2735	Po
Lac des Chavonnes	Vaud	1692	4.90	Chaux Ronde	2028	Rhone
Lai da Marmorera	Graubünden	1680	136.95	Piz d'Agnel	3204	Rhine
Oberstockensee	Bern	1665	11.80	Stockhorn	2190	Rhine
Triftsee	Bern	1640	21.7	West of the Eggstock	3485	Rhine
Hüfisee	Uri	1636	5.75	Schärhorn	3295	Rhine
Lac de Lovenex	Valais	1632	4.81	Mont Gardy	2201	Rhone
Lai da Ova Spin	Graubünden	1630	35.12	Piz Paradisin	3302	Danube
Garichtisee	Glarus	1622	15.30	Chli Chärpf	2700	Rhine
Grosssee	St. Gallen	1618	4.52	Leist	2222	Rhine
Lago di Luzzone	Ticino	1606	140.14	Piz Terri	3149	Po
Stausee Isel	Graubünden	1606	8.49	Aroser Rothorn	2980	Rhine
Lago d'Isola	Graubünden	1604	36.33	Zapporthorn	3152	Po
Hinterstockensee	Bern	1595	7.93	Stockhorn	2190	Rhine
Bannalpsee	Nidwalden	1586	15.76	Ruchstock	2814	Rhine
Oeschinen Lake	Bern	1578	114.70	Blüemlisalp	3661	Rhine
Lake Davos	Graubünden	1560	57.21	Weissfluhjoch	2693	Rhine
Arnensee	Bern	1542	44.99	Arnenhorn	2211	Rhine
Hinterburgsee	Bern	1516	4.50	Axalphorn	2321	Rhine
Heidsee	Graubünden	1484	26.13	West of Parpaner Rothorn	2861	Rhine
Lac de Champex	Valais	1466	11.23	Pointe d'Orny	3271	Rhone
Lago del Sambuco	Ticino	1461	110.91	Cristallina	2912	Po
Lag da Pigniu	Graubünden	1450	39.00	Hausstock	3158	Rhine
Lac de Derborence	Valais	1449	4.32	Diablerets	3210	Rhone
Fälensee	Appenzell Innerrhoden	1446	14.57	Altmann	2435	Rhine
Stausee Gibidum	Valais	1436	20.45	Aletschhorn	4193	Rhone
Etang de la Moubra	Valais	1425	5.08	Crans-Montana	1522	Rhone
Spaneggsee	Glarus	1425	4.81	Mürtschenstock	2441	Rhine
Oberblegisee	Glarus	1422	16.63	Glärnisch	2915	Rhine
Golzernsee	Uri	1409	6.10	Schwarz Stöckli	2614	Rhine
Lac de Taney	Valais	1408	15.80	Cornettes de Bise	2432	Rhone
Waldisee	Schwyz	1406	5.31	Sangigrat	2279	Rhine
Sufnersee	Graubünden	1401	82.31	Rheinwaldhorn	3402	Rhine
Lac du Godet	Valais	1401	4.90	East of Tour St-Martin	2726	Rhone
Lauenensee	Bern	1381	8.77	Wildhorn	3248	Rhine
Arnisee	Uri	1370	4.64	Grüenwald	1558	Rhine
Gigerwaldsee	St. Gallen	1335	68.95	Ringelspitz	3247	Rhine
Stausee Ferden	Valais	1311	10.69	Bietschhorn	3934	Rhone
Lai Runcahez	Graubünden	1277	5.48	Piz Vial	3168	Rhine
Lago di Cama	Graubünden	1265	14.07	Pizzo Paglia	2593	Po
Lac de l'Hongrin	Vaud	1255	155.30	West of Tour de Famelon	2194	Rhine
Lag da Breil	Graubünden	1255	6.27	Bifertenstock	3419	Rhine
Speichersee Mattsand	Valais	1230	4.41	Monte Rosa	4634	Rhone
Sämtisersee	Appenzell Innerrhoden	1209	18.19	Altmann	2435	Rhine
Schwendisee	St. Gallen	1159	3.3	Churfirsten	2306	Rhine
Pradellasee	Graubünden	1144	8.00	Piz Bernina	4049	Danube
Seealpsee	Appenzell Innerrhoden	1141	13.33	Säntis	2502	Rhine
Bacino di Airolo	Ticino	1130	4.78	Pizzo Rotondo	3192	Po
Voralpsee	St. Gallen	1123	15.46	Gamsberg	2384	Rhine
Lai Burvagn	Graubünden	1117	4.75	Piz Calderas	3397	Rhine
Stausee Bärenburg	Graubünden	1080	6.78	Rheinwaldhorn	3402	Rhine
Schwarzsee	Fribourg	1046	45.38	Schopfenspitz	2104	Rhine
Lac des Taillères	Neuchâtel	1040	45.86	Crêt du Cervelet	1307	Rhine
Chapfensee	St. Gallen	1030	9.44	East of Loschopf	1810	Rhine
Lac de Joux	Vaud	1004	876.50	Mont Tendre	1679	Rhine
Lac Brenet	Vaud	1002	64.65	Mont Tendre	1679	Rhine
Etang de la Gruère	Jura	998	8.11	Le Chaumont	1088	Rhine
Caumasee	Graubünden	997	10.32	Runca Sura (above Flims)	1300	Rhine
Bacino di Val Malvaglia	Ticino	990	17.30	Rheinwaldhorn	3402	Po
Eugenisee	Obwalden	990	5.44	Titlis	3238	Rhine
Obersee	Glarus	982	21.85	Redertenstock	2295	Rhine
Lago di Poschiavo	Graubünden	962	194.46	Piz Palü	3901	Po
Wägitalersee	Schwyz	900	415.27	Redertenstock	2295	Rhine
Sihlsee	Schwyz	889	1068.28	Druesberg	2282	Rhine
Stausee Mapragg	St. Gallen	865	23.25	Ringelspitz	3247	Rhine
Lac du Vernex	Vaud	859	27.97	Wildhorn	3248	Rhine
Klöntalersee	Glarus	847	318.46	Glärnisch	2914	Rhine
Crestasee	Graubünden	844	4.39	Flims Waldhaus	1100	Rhine
Wenigerweier	St. Gallen	838	4.06	Horst	1084	Rhine
Stausee Solis	Graubünden	824	17.75	Piz Kesch	3418	Rhine
Lac de Montsalvens	Fribourg	801	66.26	Vanil Noir	2389	Rhine

== See also ==
- List of glaciers in Switzerland
- List of mountains of Switzerland
- List of lakes of Switzerland
