= Crosa =

Crosa may refer to:

== People ==
- Diego Crosa (born 1976), Argentinian football player
- Fernando Crosa (born 1979), Argentinian football player
- Giacomo Crosa (born 1947), Italian journalist and high jumper
- Liliane Crosa (born 1942), Swiss figure skater

== Places ==
- Crosa, Piedmont, Italy
- Lago della Crosa, Switzerland

== Other ==
- Crosa (fly), genus of tilt-legged flies
