= Taneda =

Taneda (written: 種田) is a Japanese surname. Notable people with the surname include:

- Megumi Taneda (種田 恵) (born 1986), Japanese swimmer
- Risa Taneda (種田 梨沙) (born 1988), Japanese voice actress
- Ritsuko Taneda (種田 律子), Japanese musician
- Santōka Taneda (種田 山頭火) (1882–1940), pen-name of Taneda Shōichi, Japanese writer and poet

== See also ==
- Pizzo Taneda, mountain in the Swiss Alps
