= Bortel =

Bortel is a surname. Notable people with the surname include:

- Milan Bortel (born 1987), Slovak footballer
- Walter Bortel (1926–2000), Austrian cyclist

== Place ==
- Bortel Lake, Switzerland
