= Campolungo Pass =

Mountain pass in Ticino, Switzerland

- Location within Switzerland
- Elevation: 2,318 m (7,605 ft)
- Traversed by: Trail

Location
- Location: Ticino, Switzerland
- Range: Lepontine Alps
- Coordinates: 46°27′59″N 8°42′25″E

Campolungo pass connecting Fusio and Prat.

The Campolungo Pass (Italian: Passo Campolungo) is an Alpine pass connecting Fusio and Prat in the Swiss canton of Ticino. With a height of 2,318 metres above sea level, the Campolungo is the lowest pass connecting the valleys of Maggia and Leventina.

The pass is located between the Pizzo Massari (north) and Pizzo Campolungo (south).
