= Lago Sfundau =

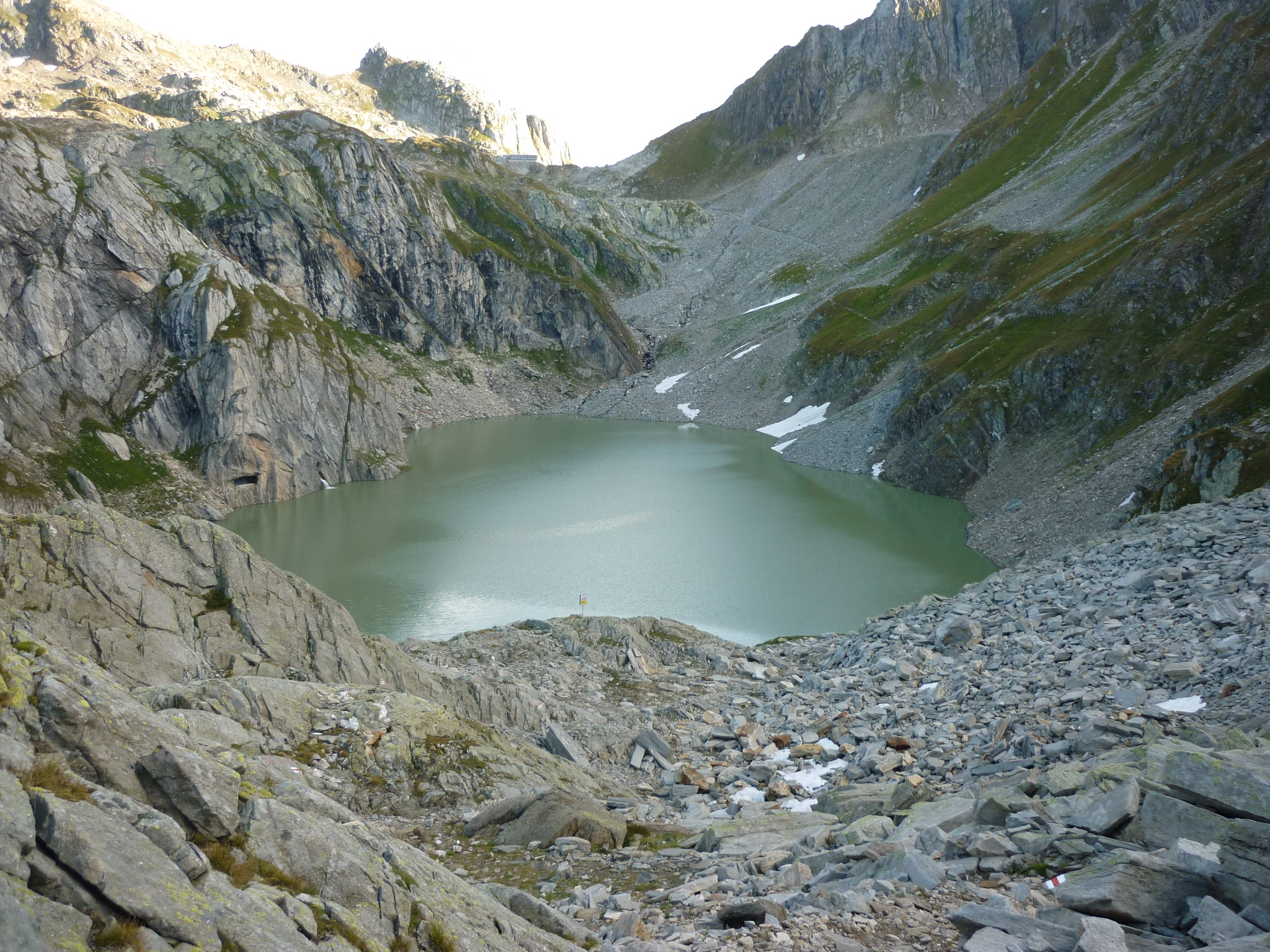

- Location within Canton of Ticino Location within Switzerland Location within Italy Location within Alps
- Interactive map of Lago Sfundau
- Location: Ticino
- Coordinates: 46°27′45″N 8°31′28″E
- Type: natural, reservoir
- Catchment area: 1.969 km^{2} (0.760 sq mi)
- Basin countries: Switzerland
- Surface area: 12.9 ha (32 acres)
- Surface elevation: 2,392 m (7,848 ft)

Lago Sfundau is a lake in Ticino, Switzerland. Its surface area is 12.9 ha (32 acres).

== See also ==
- List of mountain lakes of Switzerland
