= Lac de Fully =

Reservoir in Valais, Switzerland

Grand lac de Fully
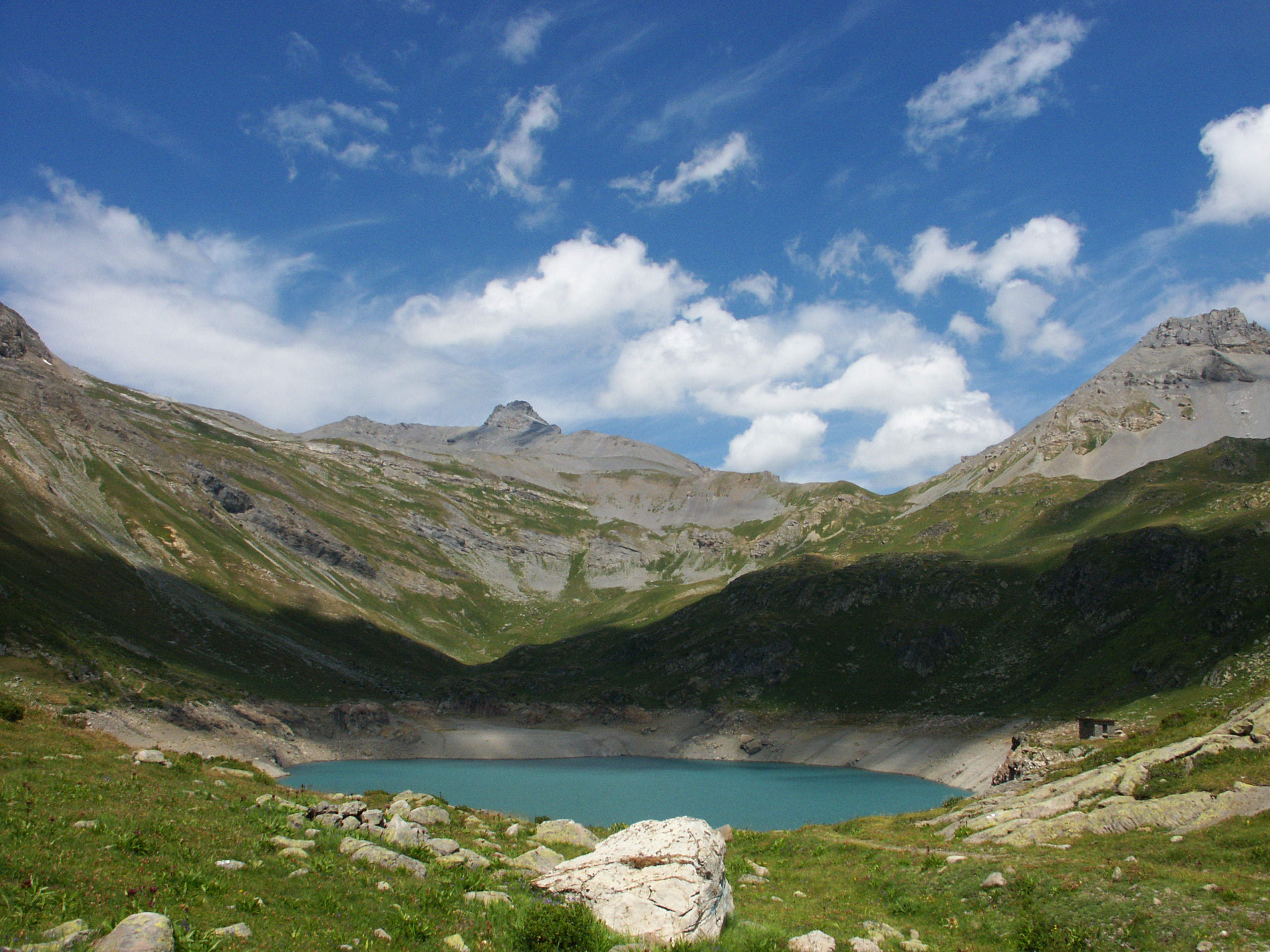

- Location within Canton of Valais Location within Canton of Vaud Location within Switzerland Location within Alps
- Interactive map of Grand lac de Fully
- Location: Valais
- Coordinates: 46°10′44″N 7°5′38″E
- Type: natural lake, reservoir
- Catchment area: 4.9 km^{2} (1.9 sq mi)
- Basin countries: Switzerland
- Surface area: 21 ha (52 acres)
- Surface elevation: 2,135 m (7,005 ft)

Grand Lac de Fully (or Lac supérieur de Fully) is a reservoir in the canton of Valais, Switzerland. The lake's surface area is 21 ha (52 acres).

== See also ==
- List of mountain lakes of Switzerland
