= Lac des Chavonnes =

Lake in Vaud, Switzerland

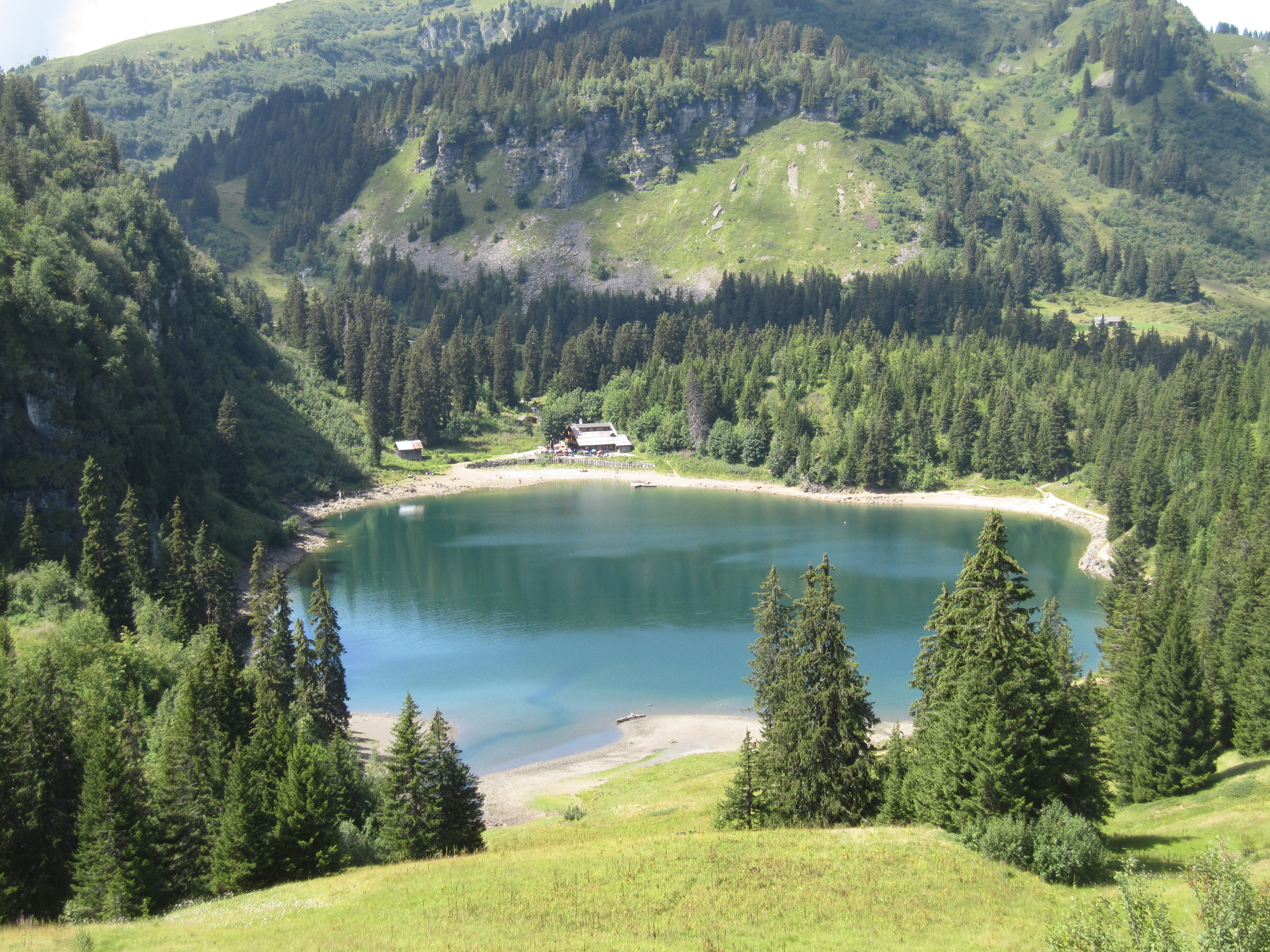

- Location within Canton of Vaud Location within Switzerland Location within Alps
- Interactive map of Lac des Chavonnes
- Location: Vaud
- Coordinates: 46°19′59″N 7°05′09″E
- Basin countries: Switzerland
- Surface area: 5 ha (12 acres)
- Max. depth: 30 m (98 ft)
- Surface elevation: 1,690 m (5,540 ft)

Lac des Chavonnes is a lake in the municipality of Ormont-Dessous, above Villars-sur-Ollon, Vaud, Switzerland. Its surface area is 5 ha (12 acres).

== See also ==
- List of mountain lakes of Switzerland
