= Illsee =

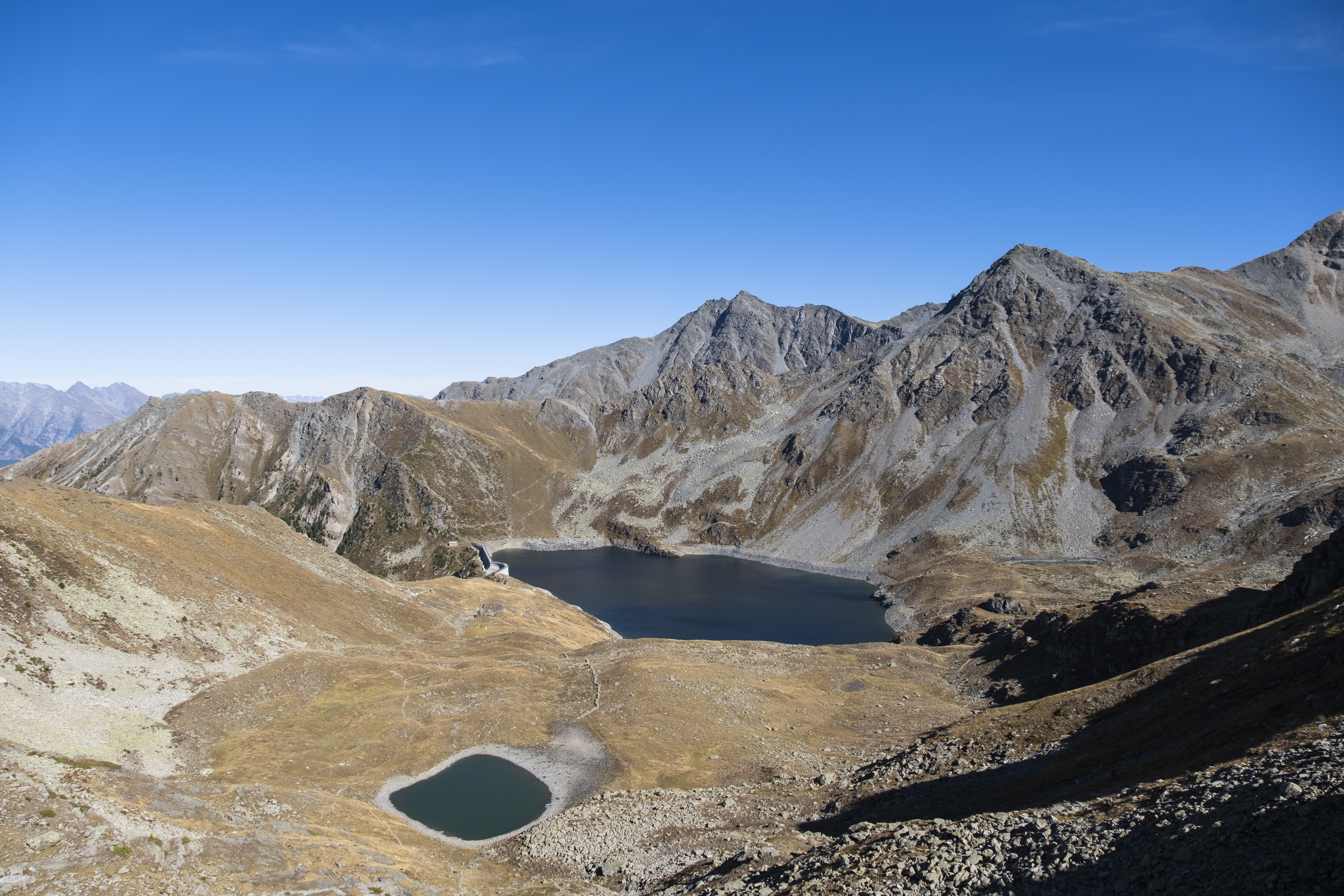

- Location within Canton of Valais Location within Switzerland Location within Alps
- Interactive map of Illsee
- Location: Sierre, Valais
- Coordinates: 46°15′27″N 7°37′57″E
- Type: natural lake, reservoir
- Primary outflows: Illbach
- Catchment area: 5.9 km^{2} (2.3 sq mi)
- Basin countries: Switzerland
- Max. length: 0.2 km (0.12 mi)
- Surface area: 0.21 km^{2} (0.081 sq mi)
- Max. depth: 64 m (210 ft)
- Water volume: 6.6 million cubic metres (5,400 acre⋅ft)
- Surface elevation: 2,360 m (7,740 ft)

Illsee is a natural lake used as a reservoir above Sierre, in the Valais, Switzerland. Its surface area is 0.21 km^{2} (0.081 sq mi).

== See also ==
- List of mountain lakes of Switzerland
