= Spilauersee =

Lake in Uri, Switzerland

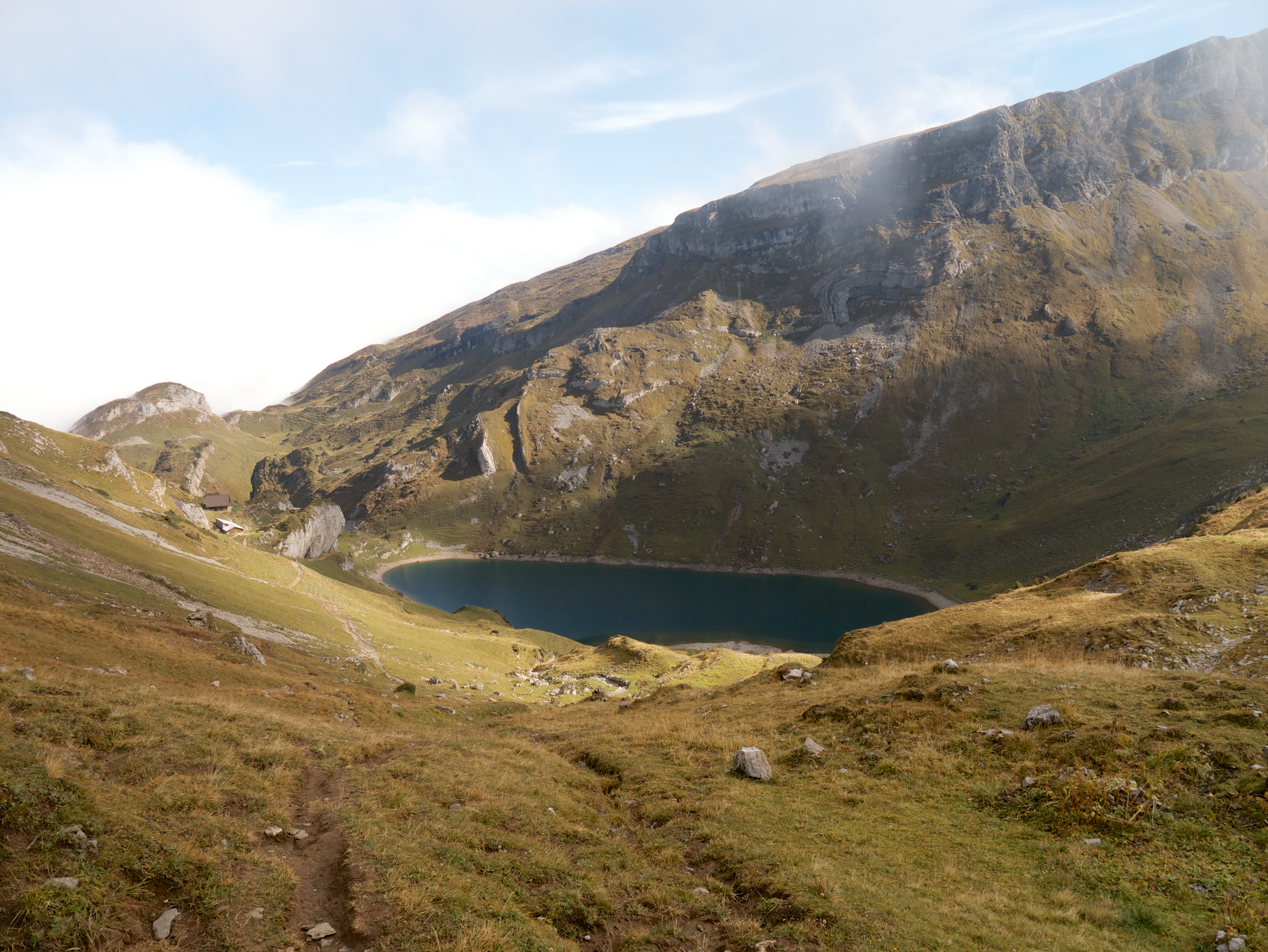
- Spilauersee

- Location within Canton of Uri Location within Canton of Schwyz Location within Switzerland Location within Alps
- Interactive map of Spilauersee
- Location: Uri
- Coordinates: 46°55′24″N 8°41′36″E
- Basin countries: Switzerland
- Surface area: 5 ha (12 acres)
- Surface elevation: 1,837 m (6,027 ft)

Spilauersee is a lake in the Canton of Uri, Switzerland, below Rossstock. The lake can be reached by foot in half an hour from the Chäppeliberg–Lidernen cable car (or aerial tramway).

== See also ==
- List of mountain lakes of Switzerland
