= Lej da Staz =

Lake in the Grisons, Switzerland

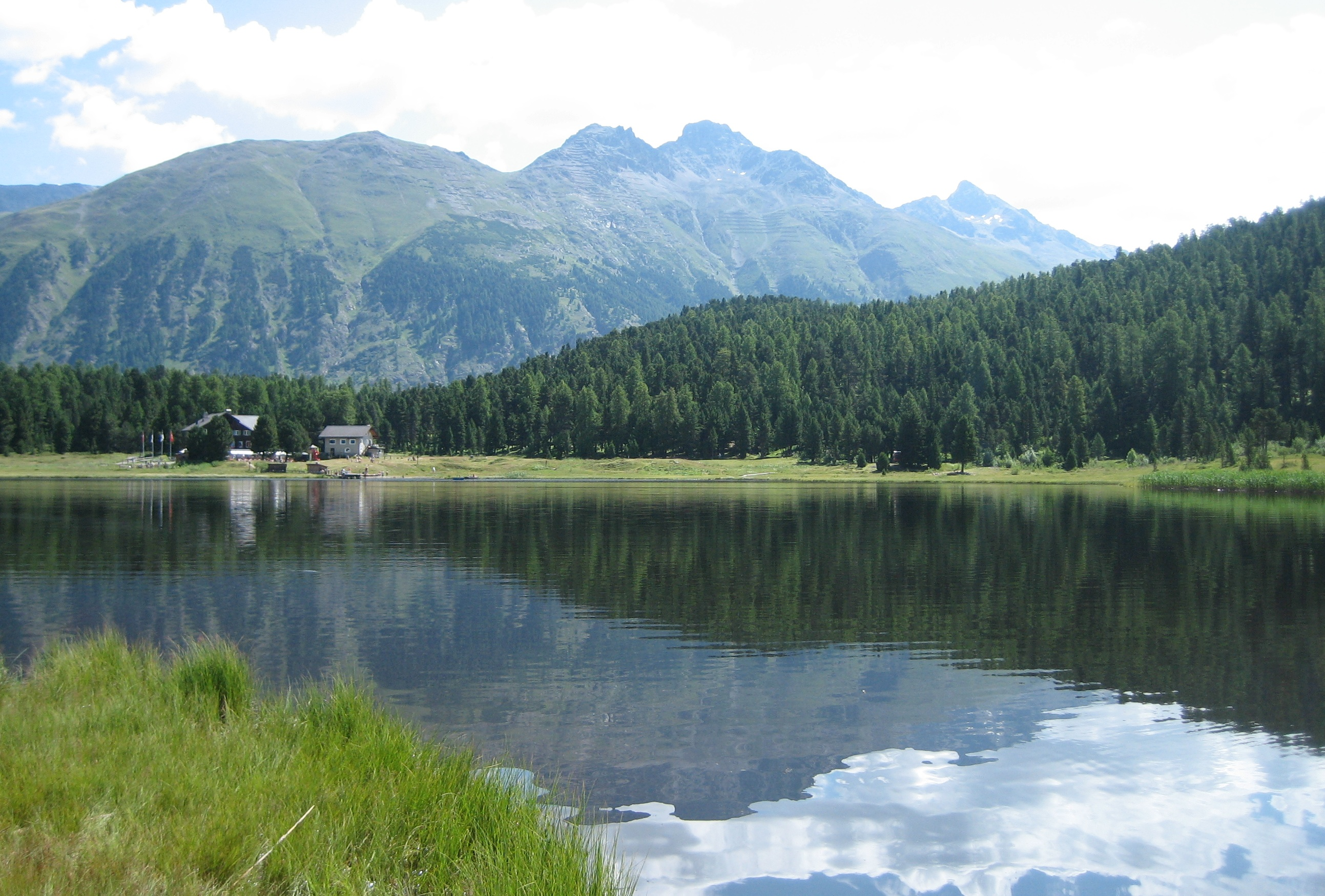

- Location within Canton of Graubünden Location within Switzerland Location within Alps
- Interactive map of Lej da Staz
- Location: Celerina/Schlarigna, Grisons
- Coordinates: 46°29′46″N 9°52′07″E
- Basin countries: Switzerland
- Max. depth: 4.7 m (15 ft)
- Surface elevation: 1,809 m (5,935 ft)

Lej da Staz (Lake of Staz, German: Stazersee) is a lake in the Engadin valley, Grisons, Switzerland. It is close to the Lake St. Moritz, surrounded by the forest of Staz ("Stazerwald").

== See also ==
- List of mountain lakes of Switzerland
