= Tschawinersee =

Lake in Valaise

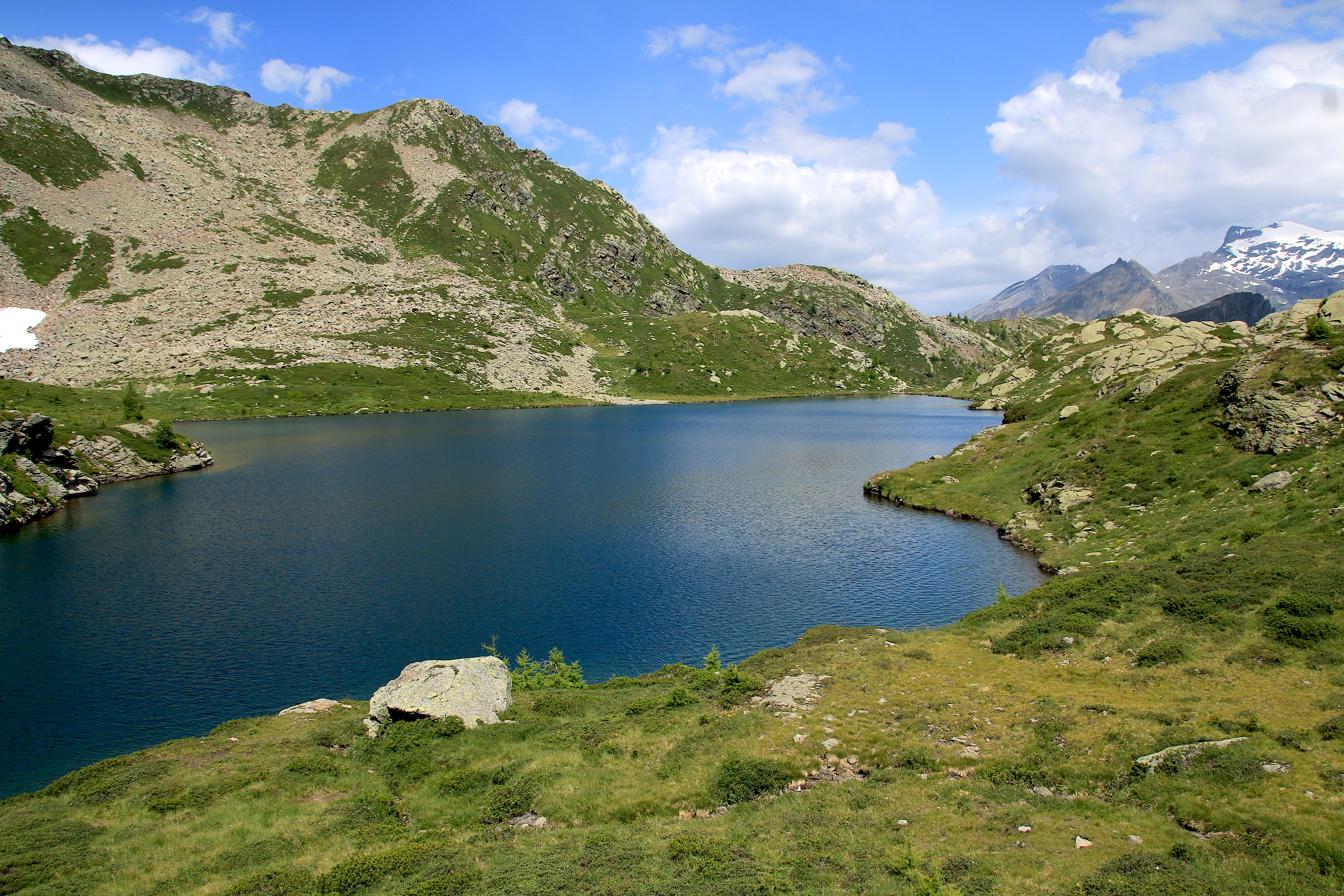
- Tschawinersee

- Location within Canton of Valais Location within Piedmont Location within Switzerland Location within Italy Location within Alps
- Interactive map of Tschawinersee
- Location: Zwischbergen, Valais
- Coordinates: 46°8′56″N 8°8′10″E
- Basin countries: Switzerland
- Surface area: 6.2 ha (15 acres)
- Surface elevation: 2,174 m (7,133 ft)

Tschawinersee is a lake in the canton of Valais, Switzerland. Located at an elevation of 2174 m, its surface area is 6.2 ha.

== Tschawinersee - Lake Chavine ==
Tschawinersee is located in the municipality of Zwischbergen in the canton of Valais, Switzerland. It is located at an altitude of 2174 meters above sea level in the Chavina area at the foot of the Irgilihorn and Chaviner Pass in the west, the Tschawinerhorn in the south and the Cima Verosso in the east.

The lake is approximately 300 meters long and 150 meters wide.

== See also ==
- List of mountain lakes of Switzerland
