= Hinterburgsee =

Lake in Bern, Switzerland

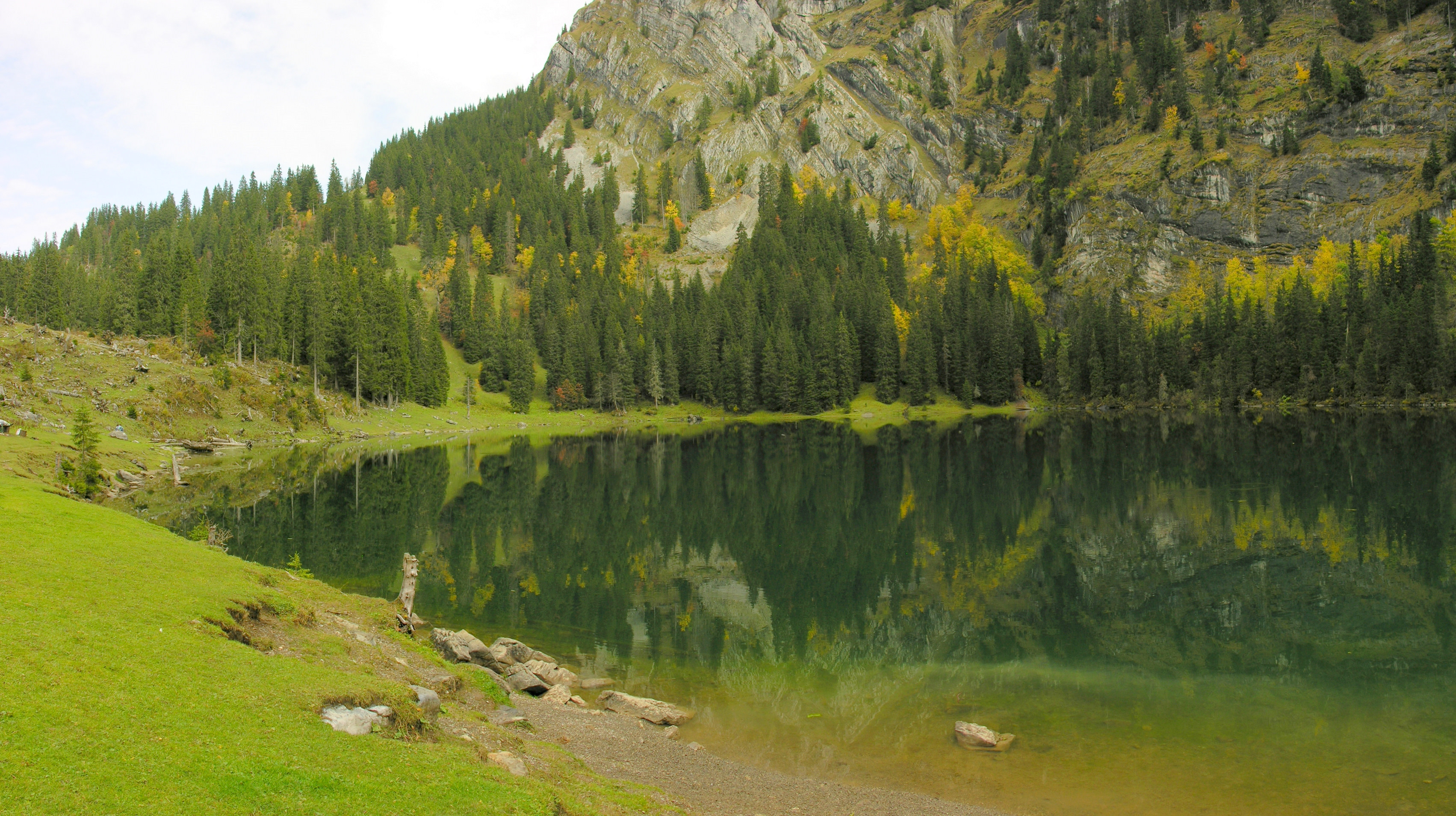

- Location within Canton of Bern Location within Switzerland Location within Alps
- Interactive map of Hinterburgsee
- Location: Canton of Bern
- Coordinates: 46°43′05″N 8°04′02″E
- Catchment area: 1.62 km^{2} (0.63 sq mi)
- Basin countries: Switzerland
- Surface area: 5 ha (12 acres)
- Max. depth: 11 m (36 ft)
- Surface elevation: 1,514 m (4,967 ft)

Hinterburgsee (or Hinterburgseeli) is a lake in the canton of Bern, Switzerland. Its surface area is 5 ha (12 acres).

== See also ==
- List of mountain lakes of Switzerland
