= Lago di Morghirolo =

Lake in Ticino, Switzerland

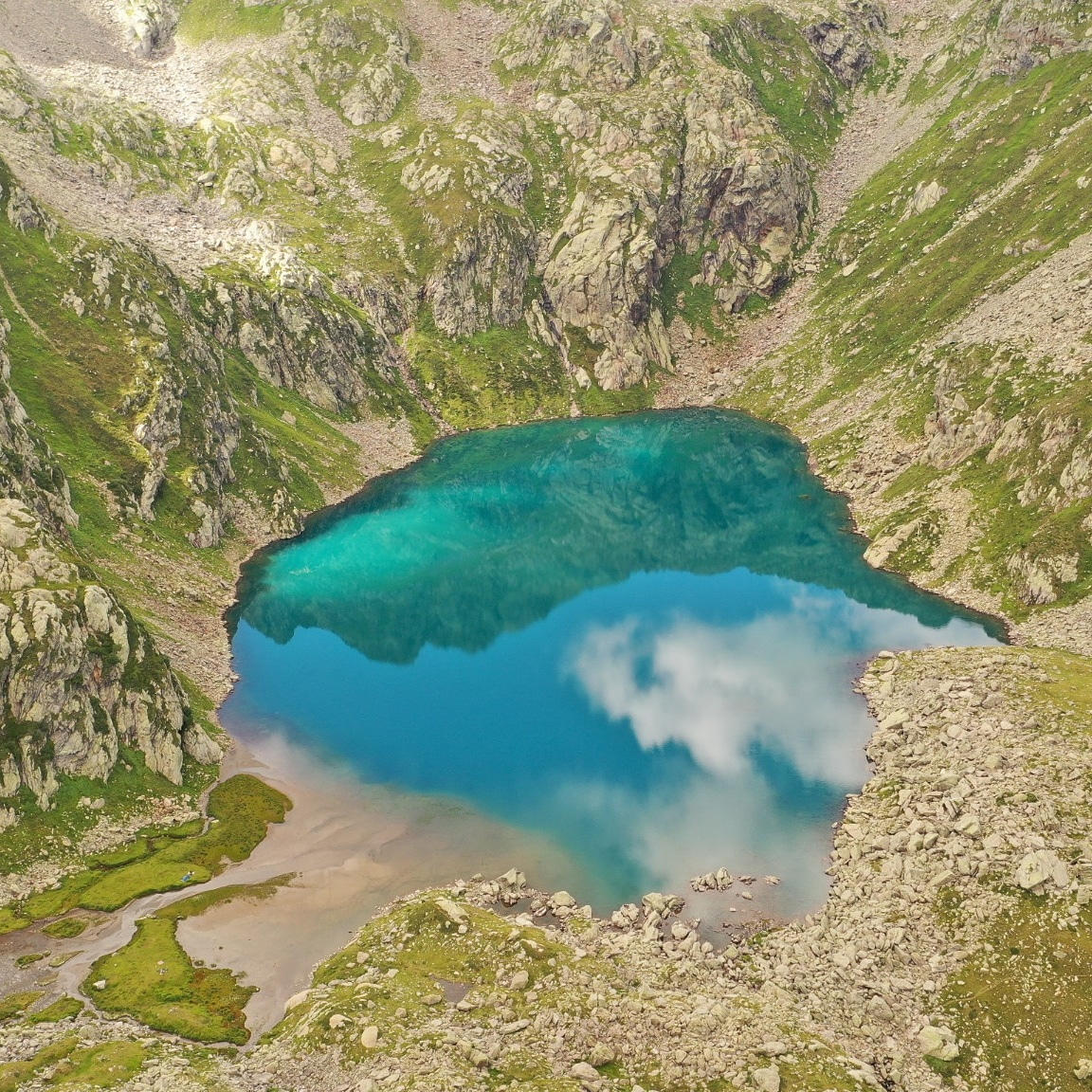

- Location within Canton of Ticino Location within Switzerland Location within Alps
- Interactive map of Lago di Morghirolo
- Location: Ticino
- Coordinates: 46.4491°N 8.7190°E
- Basin countries: Switzerland
- Surface area: 12.1636 ha (30.057 acres)
- Shore length^{1}: 1.746 km (1.085 mi)
- Surface elevation: 2,264 m (7,428 ft)
- References: Swisstopo
- ^{1} Shore length is not a well-defined measure.

Lago di Morghirolo is a lake in Ticino, Switzerland. Its surface area is 12.1636 ha (30.057 acres).

The lake can be reached by foot from Dalpe or Polpiano.

== See also ==
- List of mountain lakes of Switzerland
