= Triebtenseewli =

Lake in Bern, Switzerland

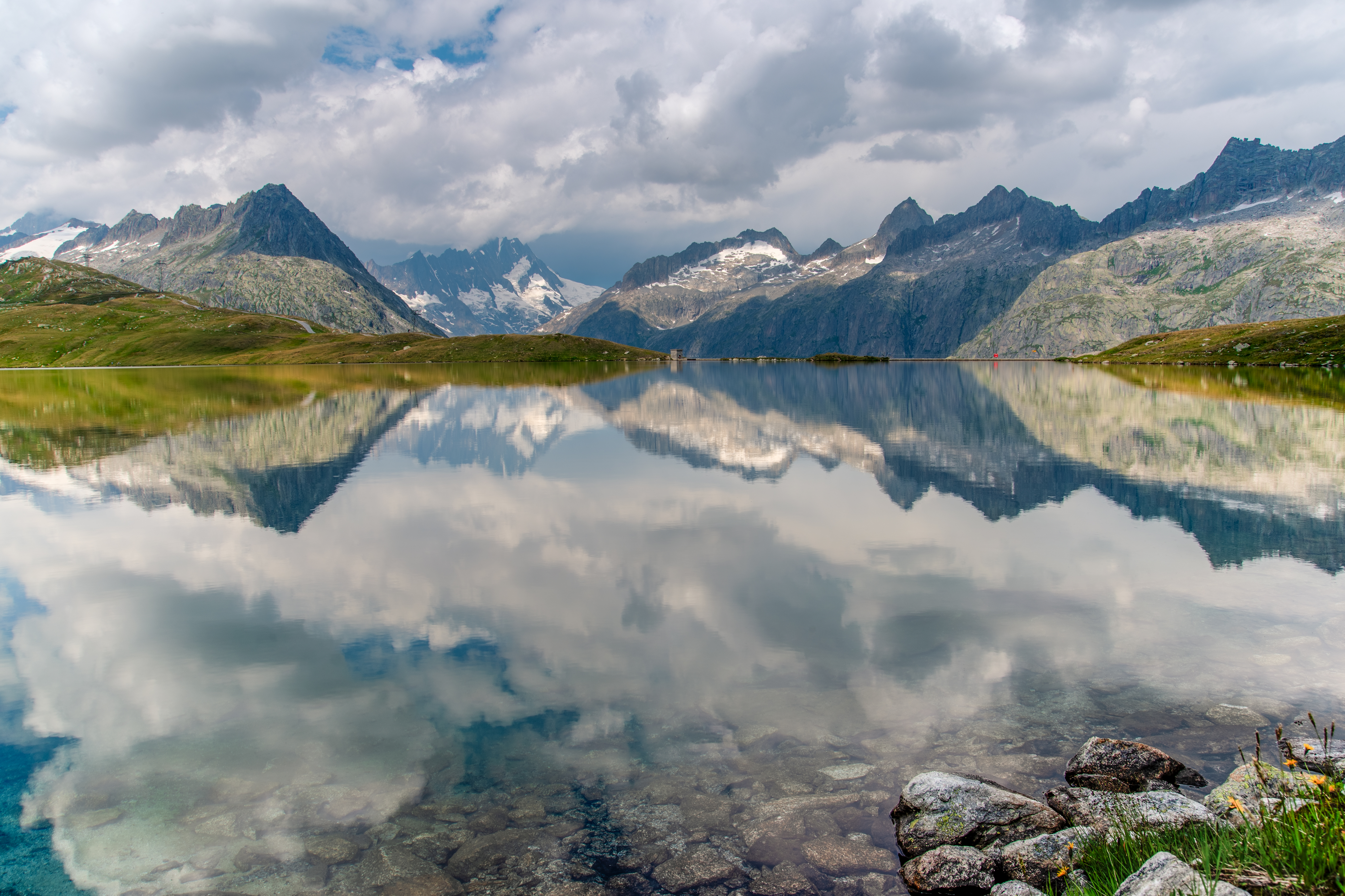

- Location within Canton of Bern Location within Switzerland Location within Alps
- Interactive map of Triebtenseewli
- Location: Canton of Bern
- Coordinates: 46°33′10″N 8°17′52″E
- Basin countries: Switzerland
- Surface area: 10 ha (25 acres)
- Max. depth: 24 m (79 ft)
- Surface elevation: 2,365 m (7,759 ft)

Triebtenseewli is a lake near Grimsel Pass in the canton of Bern, Switzerland. Its surface area is 10 ha.

== See also ==
- List of mountain lakes of Switzerland
