= Sägistalsee =

Lake in the canton of Bern, Switzerland

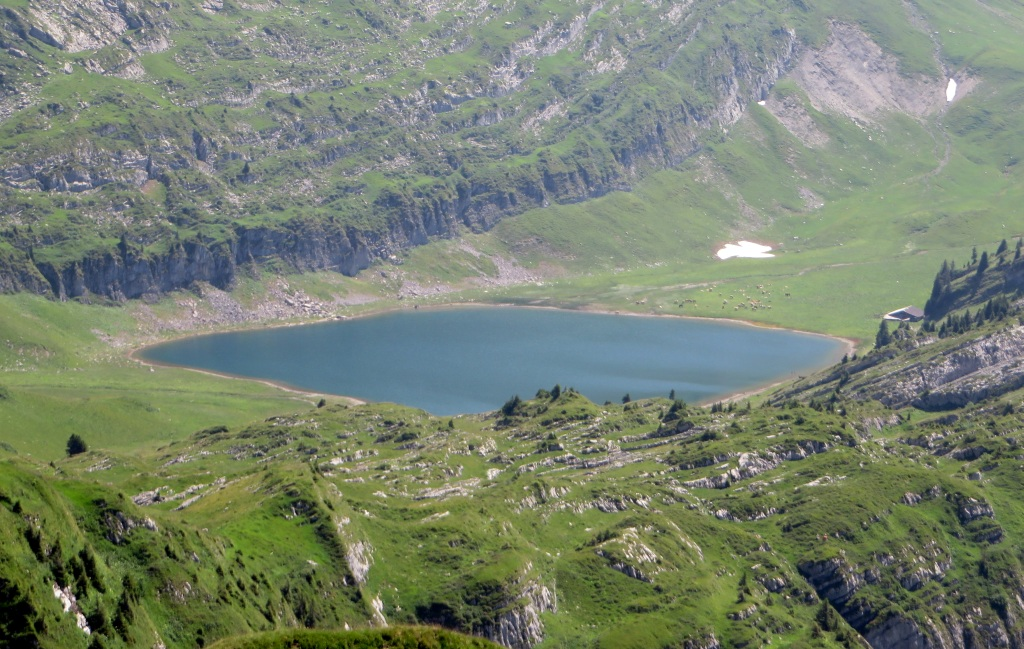

- Location within Canton of Bern Location within Switzerland Location within Alps
- Interactive map of Sägistalsee
- Location: Canton of Bern
- Coordinates: 46°40′47″N 7°58′35″E
- Catchment area: 3.85 km^{2} (1.49 sq mi)
- Basin countries: Switzerland
- Surface area: 7 ha (17 acres)
- Max. depth: 9.7 m (32 ft)
- Surface elevation: 1,935 m (6,348 ft)

Sägistalsee is a lake in canton of Bern, Switzerland. Its surface area is 7 ha (17 acres). The lake's sediments were studied to determine past climate and human activities. Since the site is located in a closed, 46 m deep depression, a pronounced Cold-air pool forms when meteorological conditions are right. A privately operated automatic weather station has been recording the air temperature at the current location by the lake since October 30, 2022. Since then, temperatures below −40 °C (−40 °F) have been measured twice, including a low of −42.4 °C (−44.3 °F) in January 2023. This is the lowest temperature recorded in Switzerland in the winter of 2022–23. MeteoSwiss has described the Sägistalsee reading as plausible, but emphasises that it was obtained by an amateur station in a very small cold-air hollow and therefore reflects highly local microclimatic conditions; it does not replace the official Swiss low-temperature record of −41.8 °C (−43.2 °F), measured at La Brévine (Neuchâtel) on 12 January 1987 by the national observing network.

== See also ==
- List of mountain lakes of Switzerland
