= Seebergsee =

Lake in Bern, Switzerland

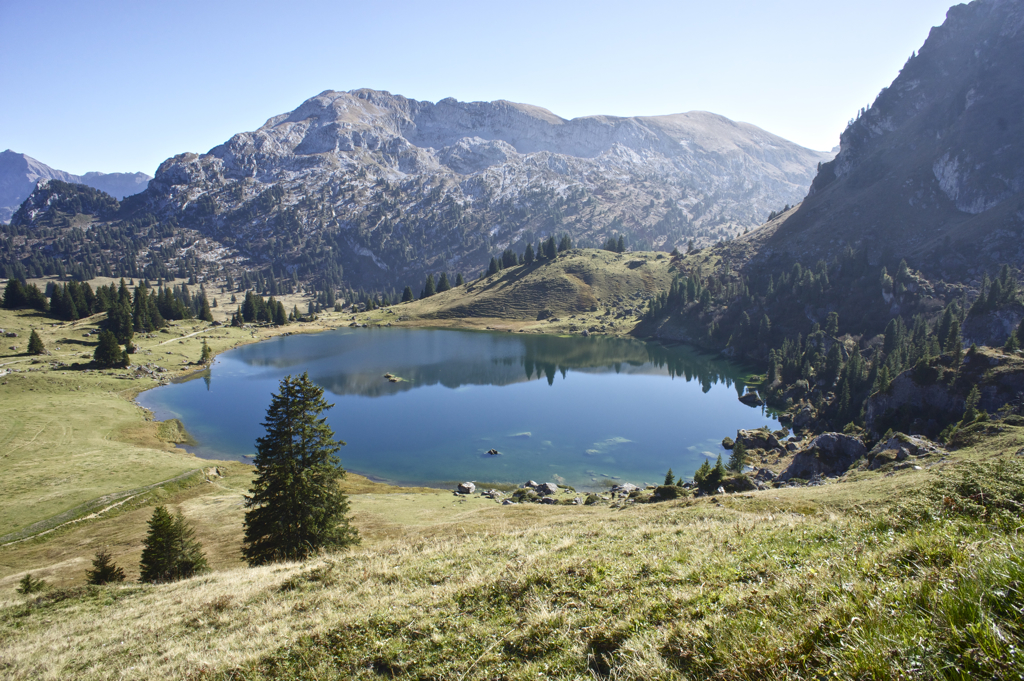

- Location within Canton of Bern Location within Switzerland Location within Alps
- Interactive map of Seebergsee
- Location: Canton of Bern
- Coordinates: 46°34′38″N 7°26′35″E
- Catchment area: 0.23 km^{2} (0.089 sq mi)
- Basin countries: Switzerland
- Surface area: 6 ha (15 acres)
- Max. depth: 15.5 m (51 ft)
- Water volume: 0.38 hm^{3} (310 acre⋅ft)
- Surface elevation: 1,830 m (6,000 ft)

Seebergsee is a mountain lake above Zweisimmen in the canton of Bern, Switzerland.

== See also ==
- List of mountain lakes of Switzerland
