= Lej da la Tscheppa =

Lake in the Grisons, Switzerland

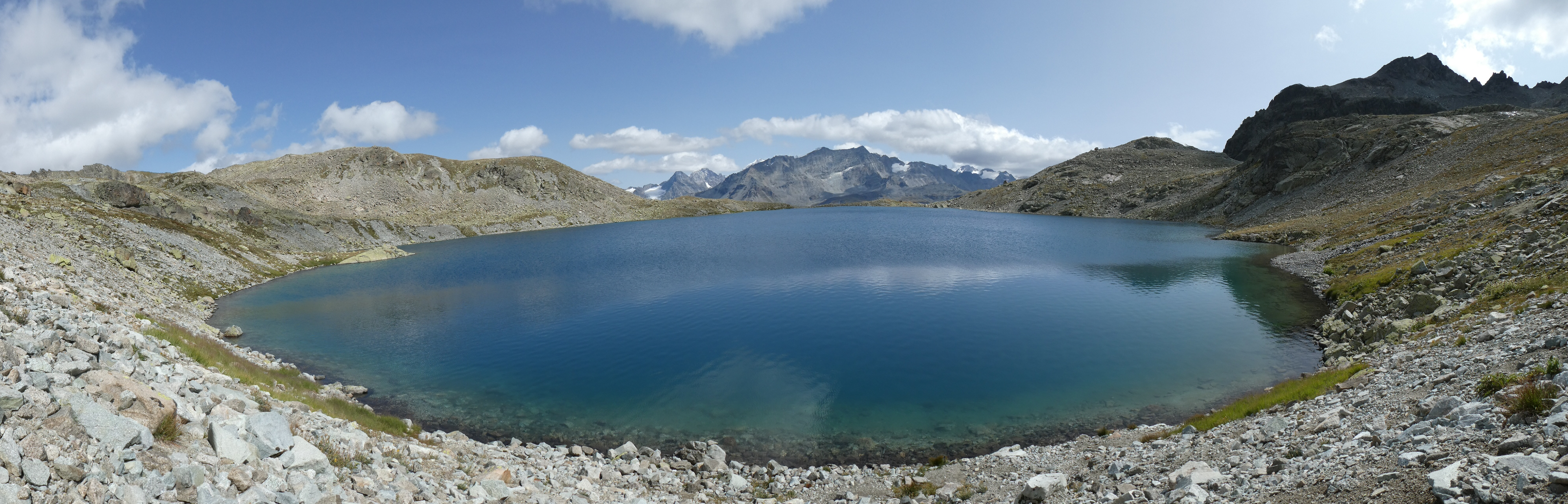

- Location within Canton of Graubünden Location within Switzerland Location within Alps
- Interactive map of Lej da la Tscheppa
- Location: Grisons
- Coordinates: 46°27′03″N 9°45′06″E
- Primary outflows: Ova da la Tscheppa
- Basin countries: Switzerland
- Surface area: 7.96 ha (19.7 acres)
- Average depth: 12.4 m (41 ft)
- Max. depth: 32 m (105 ft)
- Surface elevation: 2,616 m (8,583 ft)
- Frozen: November - June (ice)

Lej da la Tscheppa is a lake above Sils Maria, in the Engadine valley of the Grisons, Switzerland. Its surface area is 7.96 ha (19.7 acres) at an elevation of 2616 m. It used to be fed by water from the Crasta-Tscheppa Glacier (melted in 2003).

== See also ==
- List of mountain lakes of Switzerland
