= Distelsee =

- Location within Canton of Valais Location within Switzerland Location within Alps
- Interactive map of Distelsee
- Location: Münster, Valais
- Coordinates: 46°27′48″N 8°19′23″E
- Type: natural freshwater lake
- Primary outflows: Agene
- Basin countries: Switzerland
- Max. length: 320 metres (1,050 ft)
- Max. width: 265 metres (869 ft)
- Surface area: 4.8 ha (12 acres)
- Surface elevation: 2,587 m (8,488 ft)

Distelsee is a high alpine lake in the canton of Valais, Switzerland. It is located at an elevation of 2587 m, below Brudelhorn. Its surface area is 4.8 ha.

== See also ==
- List of mountain lakes of Switzerland
