= Lago Nero (Ticino) =

Lake in Ticino, Switzerland

- Location within Canton of Ticino Location within Switzerland Location within Alps
- Interactive map of Lago Nero
- Location: Ticino
- Coordinates: 46°26′57″N 8°32′21″E
- Basin countries: Switzerland
- Surface area: 14 ha (35 acres)
- Surface elevation: 2,387 m (7,831 ft)

Lago Nero is a lake in the canton of Ticino, Switzerland. Its surface area is 14 ha (35 acres).

== See also ==
- List of mountain lakes of Switzerland
