= Jöriseen =

Group of Alpine lakes in Switzerland

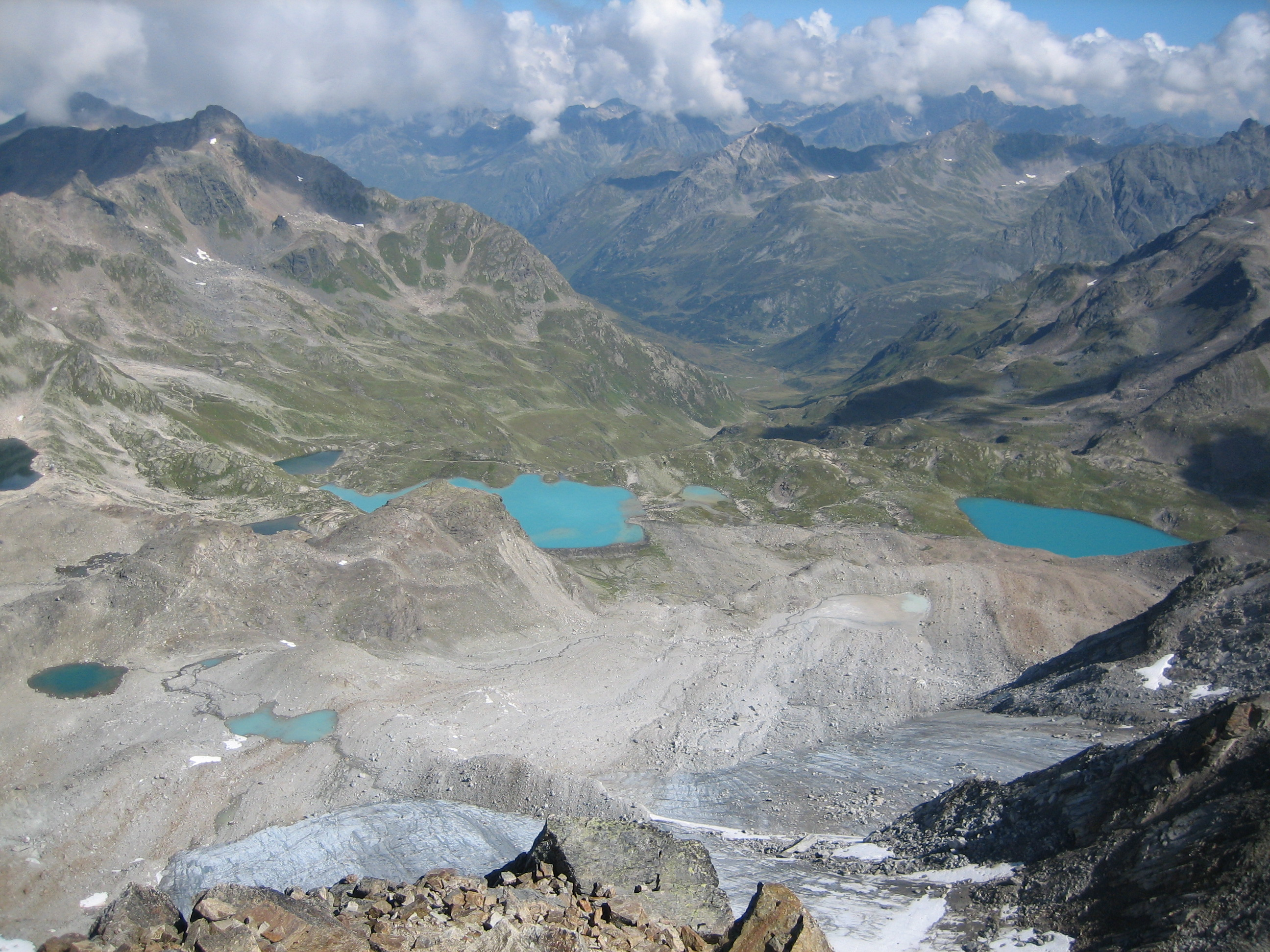
- View from the Flüela Wisshorn

- Location within Canton of Graubünden Location within Switzerland Location within Italy Location within Alps
- Interactive map of Jöriseen
- Location: Graubünden
- Coordinates: 46°46′43″N 9°58′04″E
- Primary outflows: Jöribach
- Basin countries: Switzerland
- Surface area: 9.5 ha (23 acres)
- Surface elevation: 2,489 m (8,166 ft)

The Jöriseen are a group of Alpine lakes located west of the Jörifless Pass and north of the Flüela Wisshorn, in the Swiss canton of Graubünden. The largest lake has an area of 0.095 km² and is located at 2,489 metres above sea level. They are located in the municipality of Klosters.

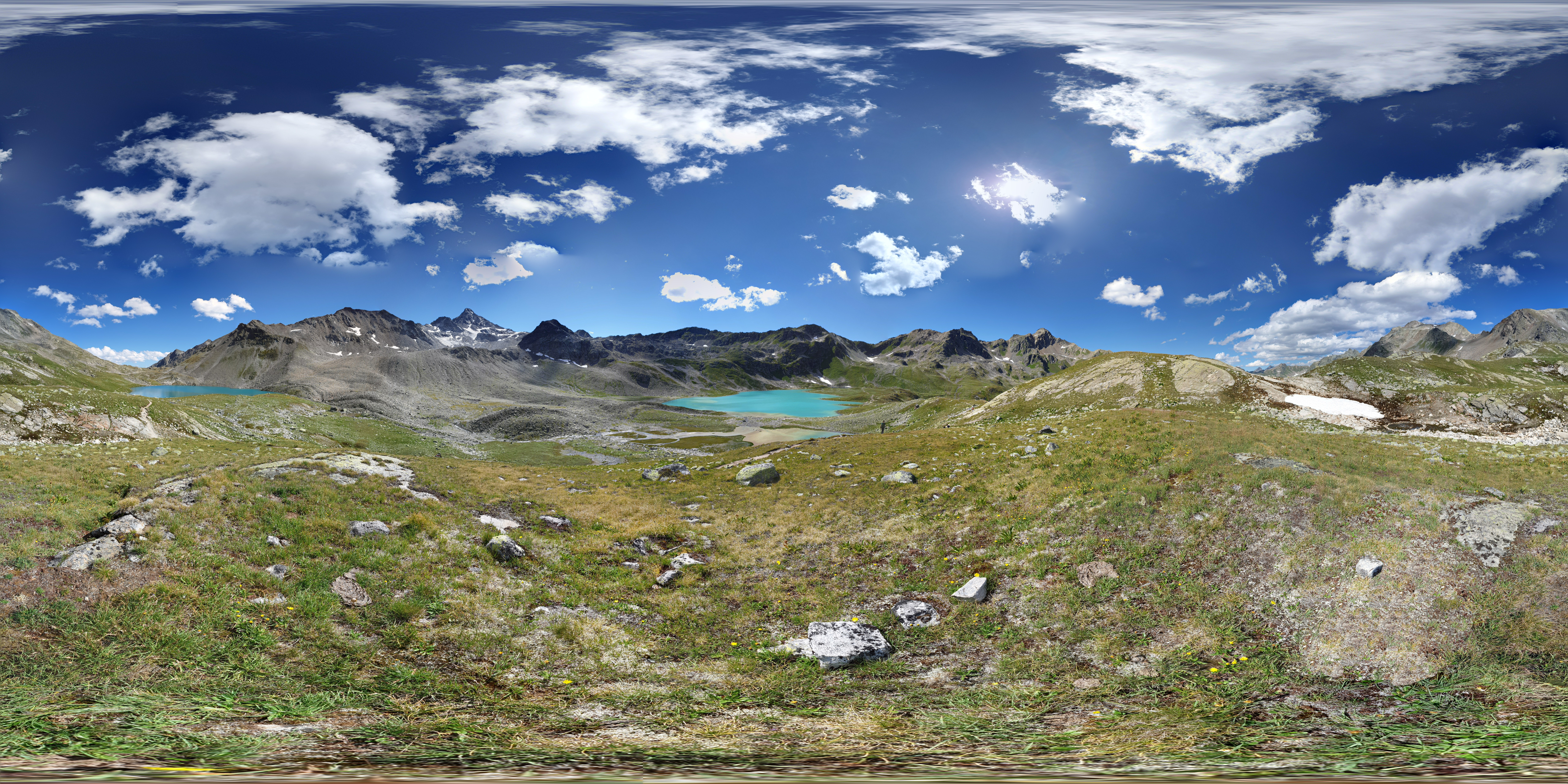
Spherical Panorama from Jöriseen (view as a 360° interactive panorama)

== See also ==
- List of mountain lakes of Switzerland
