= Lago di Chironico =

Lake in Ticino, Switzerland

- Location within Canton of Ticino Location within Switzerland Location within Alps
- Interactive map of Lago di Chironico
- Location: Ticino
- Coordinates: 46°23′47″N 8°47′59″E
- Basin countries: Switzerland
- Surface area: 15 ha (37 acres)
- Surface elevation: 1,763 m (5,784 ft)

Lago di Chironico (or simply Laghetto) is an Alpine lake located above Chironico, in the Swiss canton Ticino. The lake lies at a height of 1,763 metres. Its surface area is 15 ha (37 acres).

== See also ==
- List of mountain lakes of Switzerland
