= Eugenisee =

Lake in Obwalden, Switzerland

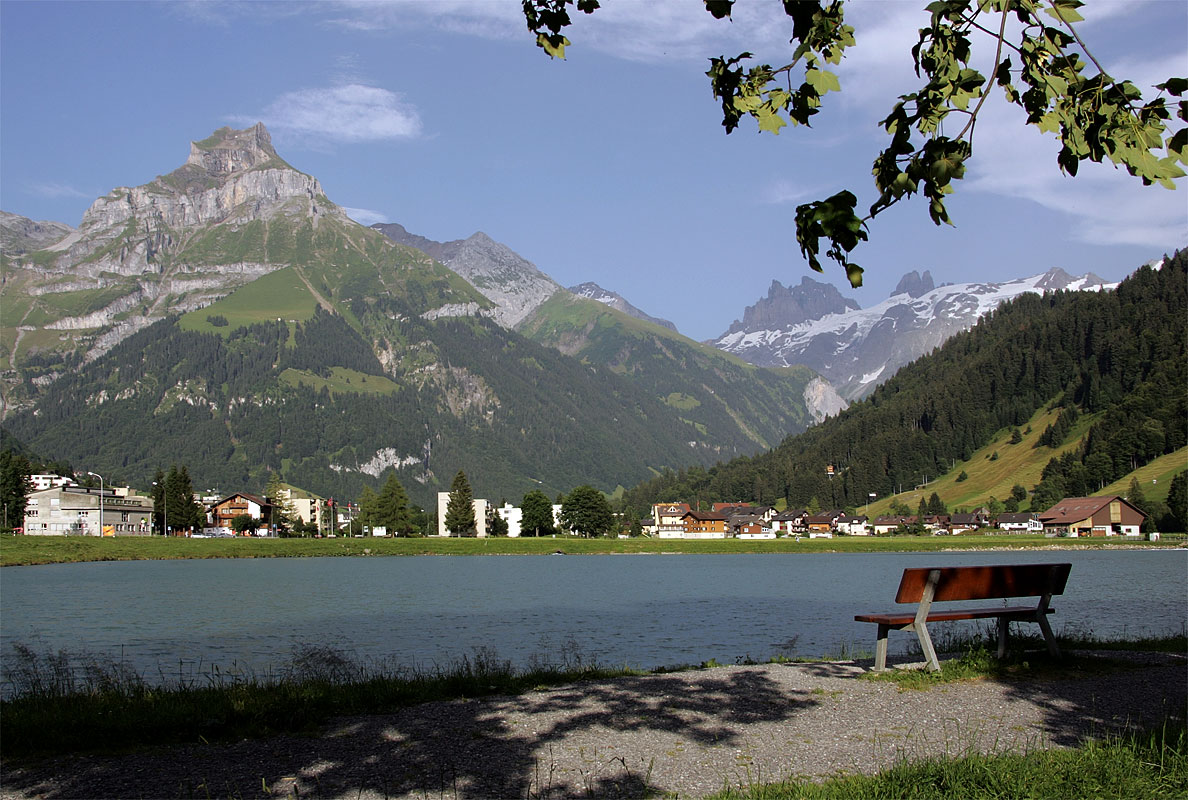

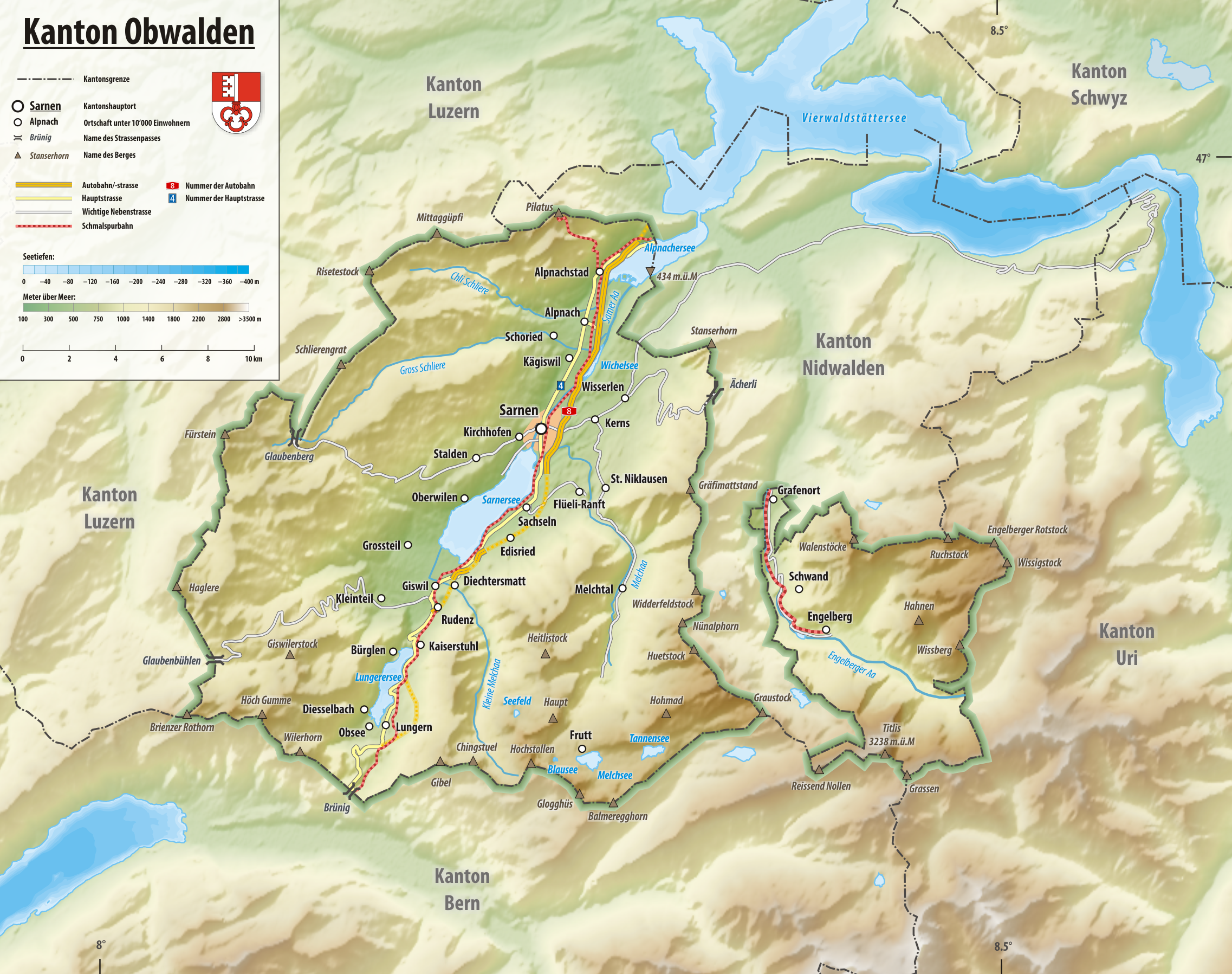
- Location within Canton of Obwalden Location within Canton of Bern Location within Switzerland Location within Alps
- Interactive map of Eugenisee
- Location: Engelberg, Obwalden
- Coordinates: 46.819°N 8.39°E
- Primary inflows: Engelbergeraa
- Primary outflows: Engelbergeraa
- Basin countries: Switzerland

Eugenisee is a lake at Engelberg in the canton of Obwalden, Switzerland. In summer, it is stocked with brown trout and rainbow trout for fishing. In the floods of August 2005, the lake was filled with large quantities of sediments.

== See also ==
- List of mountain lakes of Switzerland
