= Lac des Vaux =

Lake in Valais, Switzerland

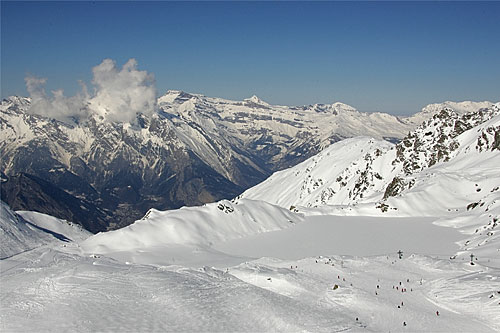
- Frozen lake in the ski area of Verbier

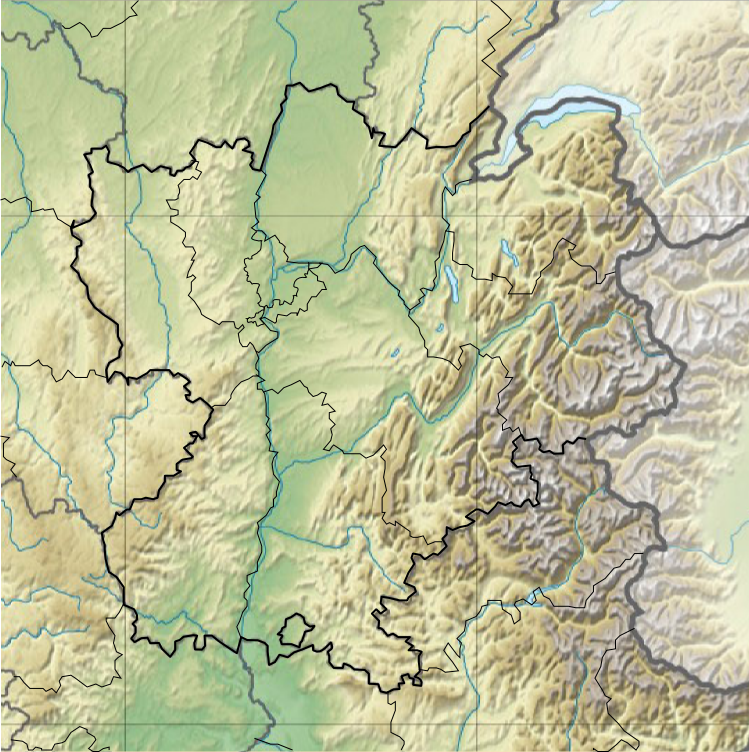
- Location within Canton of Valais Location within Rhône-Alpes Location within Switzerland Location within France Location within Alps
- Interactive map of Lac des Vaux
- Location: Riddes, Valais
- Coordinates: 46°6′28″N 7°16′21″E
- Primary outflows: La Fare
- Basin countries: Switzerland
- Surface area: 13 ha (32 acres)
- Surface elevation: 2,543 m (8,343 ft)

Lac des Vaux is a lake above La Tzoumaz and Verbier in the canton of Valais, Switzerland. The lake is located in the municipality of Riddes-La Tzoumaz.

== Geography ==
Owing to its high altitude and its main source coming from melted snow, the lake remains cold throughout most of the year. The lake usually starts to freeze early October and only starts melting late May. July and August is when the lake reaches its warmest temperature of about 10 °C to 12 °C, this is when most people swim. Swimming is still possible until early October, however, a wet suit is recommended as the water temperature is only about 5 °C.

== See also ==
- List of mountain lakes of Switzerland
