= Bacino di Val Malvaglia =

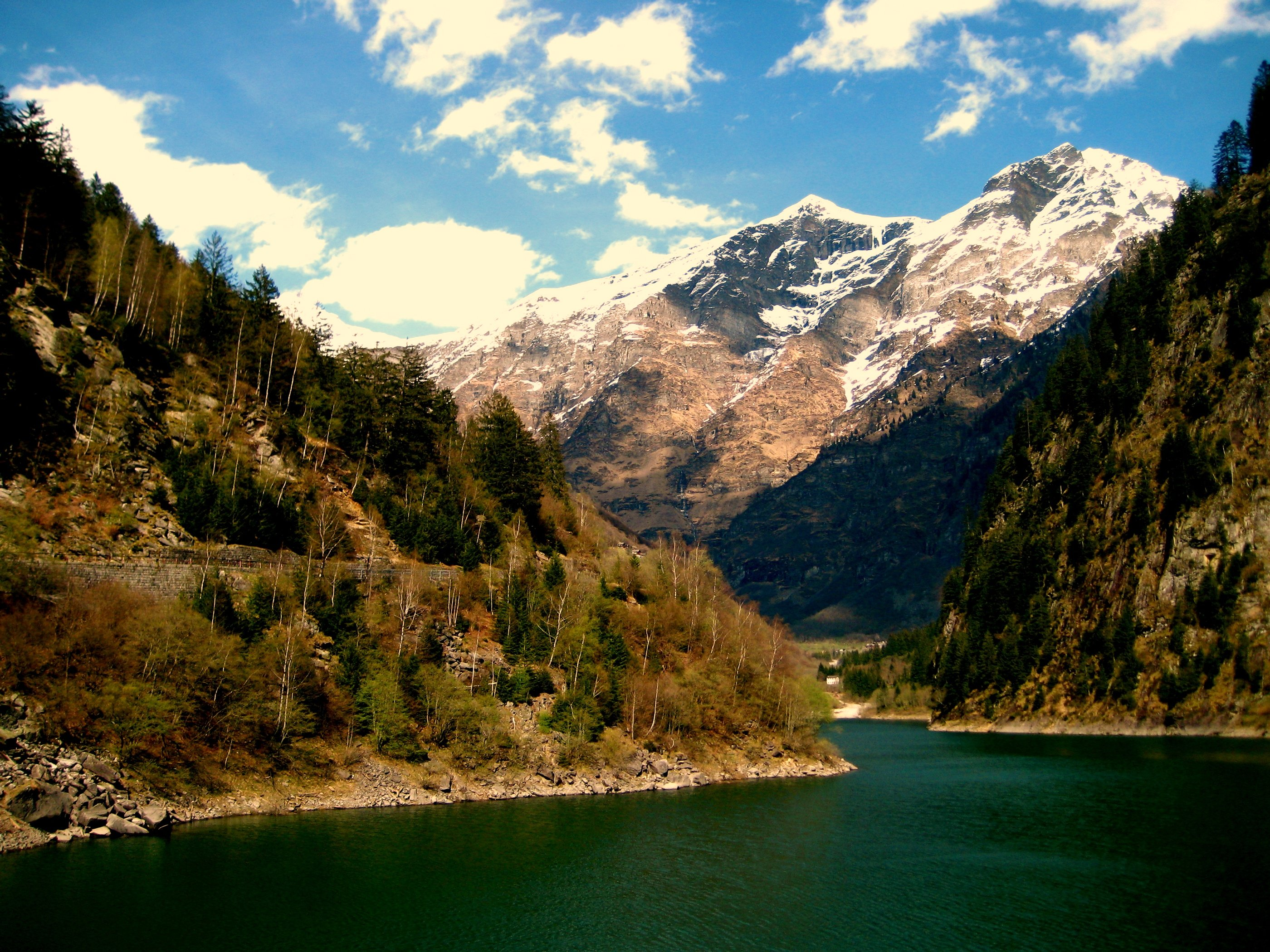

- Location within Canton of Ticino Location within Switzerland Location within Alps
- Interactive map of Bacino di Val Malvaglia
- Location: Malvaglia, Ticino
- Coordinates: 46°25′27″N 9°01′19″E
- Type: reservoir
- Primary inflows: Orino
- Primary outflows: Orino
- Basin countries: Switzerland
- Surface area: 19 ha (47 acres)
- Surface elevation: 990 m (3,250 ft)

Bacino di Val Malvaglia (or Lago di Malvaglia) is a lake above Malvaglia in the canton of Ticino, Switzerland. The reservoir's surface area is 0.19 km^{2}. Its arch dam was built in 1959 and is operated by Officine Idroelettriche di Blenio SA (Ofible).

== See also ==
- List of mountain lakes of Switzerland
