= Lac de Lovenex =

Lake in Valais, Switzerland

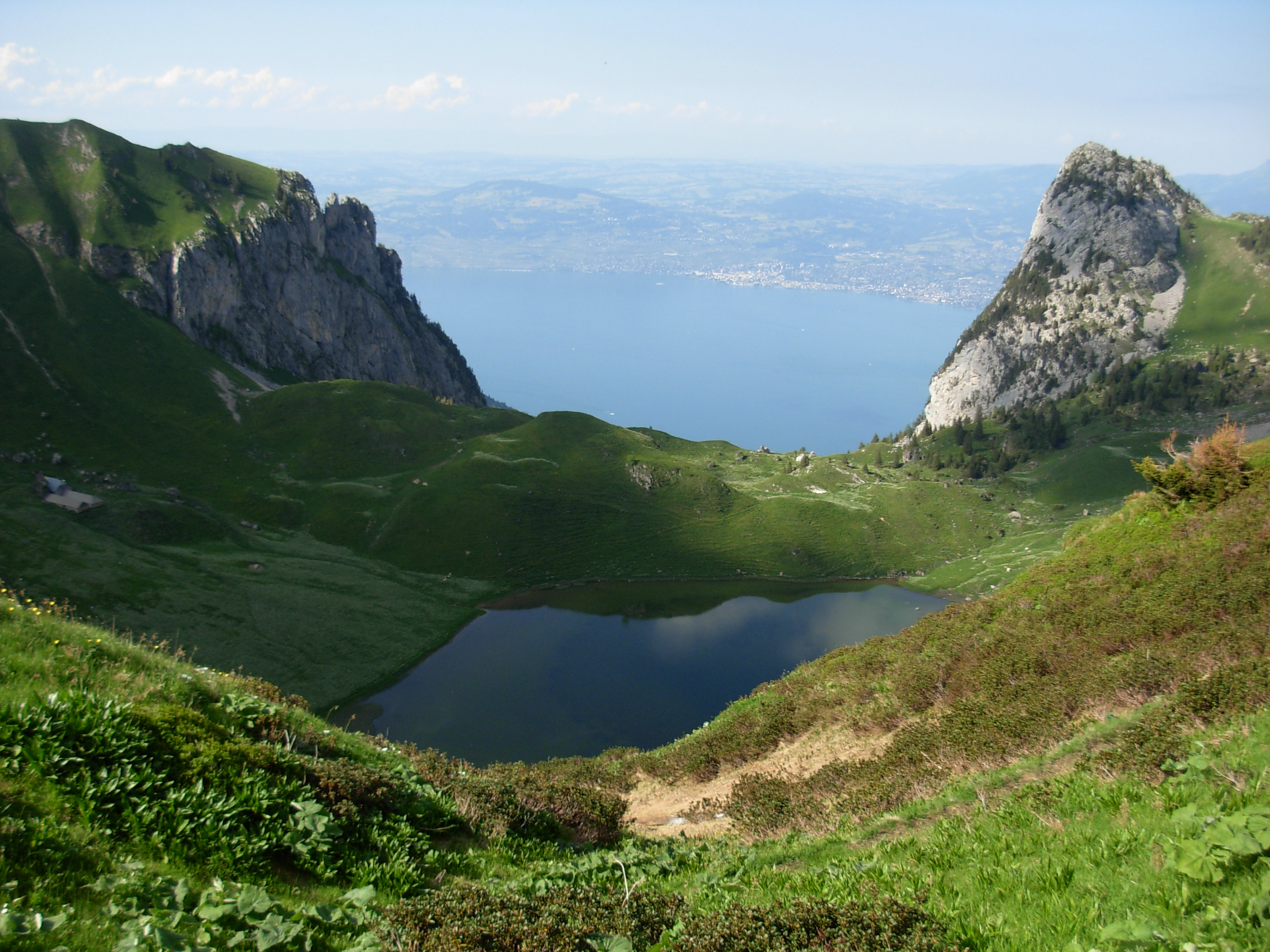

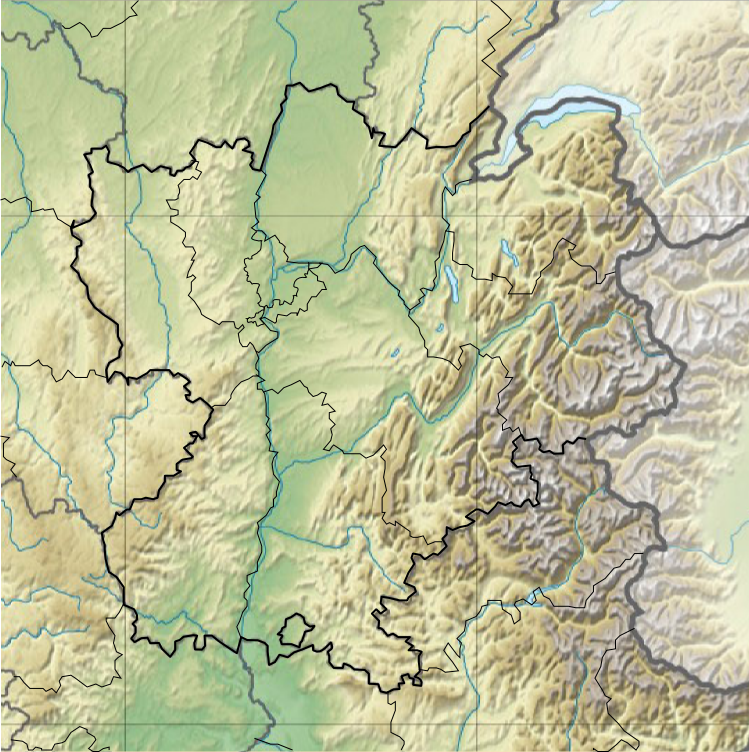
- Location within Canton of Valais Location within Rhône-Alpes Location within Switzerland Location within France Location within Alps
- Interactive map of Lac de Lovenex
- Location: Saint-Gingolph, Valais
- Coordinates: 46°21′12″N 6°47′24″E
- Basin countries: Switzerland
- Surface area: 4.7 ha (12 acres)
- Surface elevation: 1,632 m (5,354 ft)

Lac de Lovenex is a lake in the municipality of St-Gingolph, Valais, Switzerland. It is located an elevation of 1632 m below Mont Gardy. The lake's surface area is 4.7 hectares (12 acres).

Lac-de-Lovenex

== See also ==
- List of mountain lakes of Switzerland
