= Mattenalpsee =

Reservoir in the municipality of Innertkirchen, Canton of Bern, Switzerland

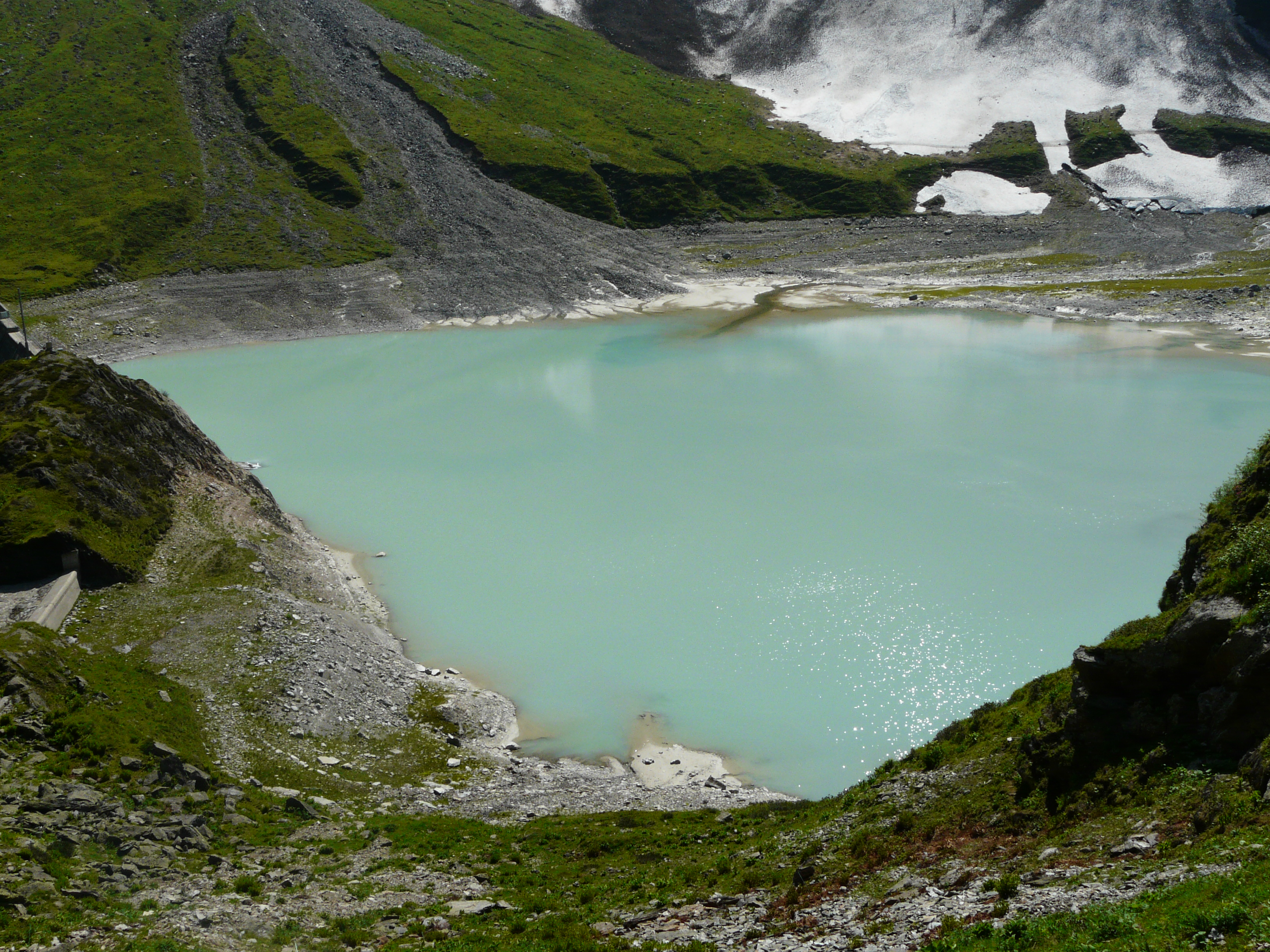

- Location within Canton of Bern Location within Switzerland Location within Alps
- Interactive map of Mattenalpsee
- Location: Canton of Bern
- Coordinates: 46°37′49″N 8°14′03″E
- Type: reservoir
- Basin countries: Switzerland
- Surface area: 18.6 ha (46 acres)
- Surface elevation: 1,876 m (6,155 ft)

Mattenalpsee (or Lake Mattenalp) is a reservoir in the municipality of Innertkirchen, canton of Bern, Switzerland. Its surface area is 18.6 ha (46 acres). The reservoir receives the water from Gauli Glacier. The water is channeled into Räterichsbodensee.

== See also ==
- List of mountain lakes of Switzerland
