= Lämmerensee =

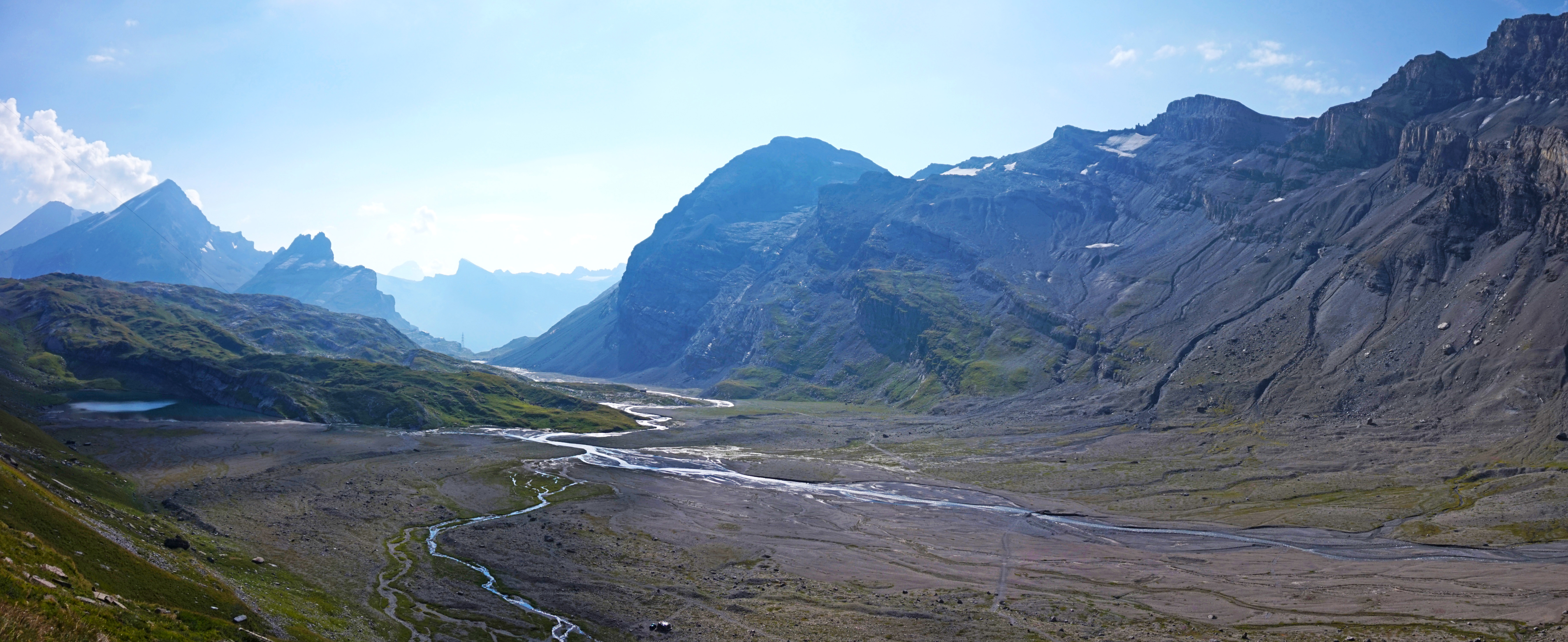
- On the left is the lake Lämmerensee, Switzerland.

- Location within Canton of Valais Location within Canton of Bern Location within Switzerland Location within Alps
- Interactive map of Lämmerensee
- Location: Leukerbad, Valais
- Coordinates: 46°23′59″N 7°35′07″E
- Type: artificial lake
- Basin countries: Switzerland
- Surface area: 6.7 ha (17 acres)
- Surface elevation: 2,296 m (7,533 ft)

Lämmerensee is a lake on Lämmerenalp in the municipality of Leukerbad in the canton of Valais, Switzerland. Its surface area is 6.7 ha. At an elevation of 2,296 m, it is located below Lämmerengrat.

== See also ==
- List of mountain lakes of Switzerland
