= Lac de Lona =

Lake in Valais, Switzerland

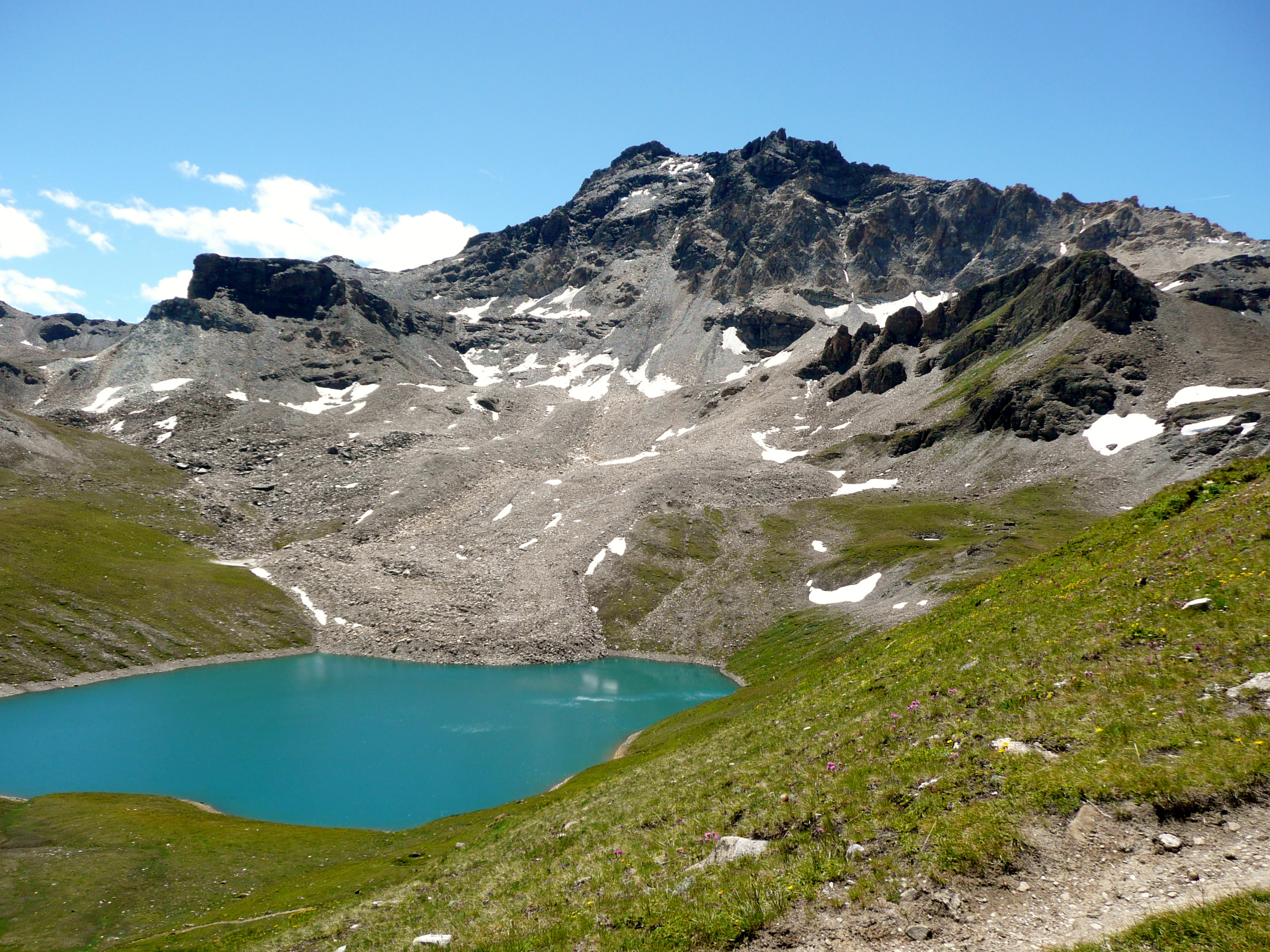
- Lac de Lona near Grimentz in the Swiss canton of Valais with Sasseneire in the background

- Location within Canton of Valais Location within Switzerland Location within Alps
- Interactive map of Lac de Lona
- Location: Grimentz, Valais
- Coordinates: 46°09′08″N 7°31′43″E
- Basin countries: Switzerland
- Surface area: 6 ha (15 acres)
- Surface elevation: 2,640 m (8,660 ft)

Lac de Lona is a lake at an elevation of 2,640 m above Grimentz, in the canton of Valais, Switzerland.

== See also ==
- List of mountain lakes of Switzerland
