= Arnenhorn =

Mountain in Switzerland

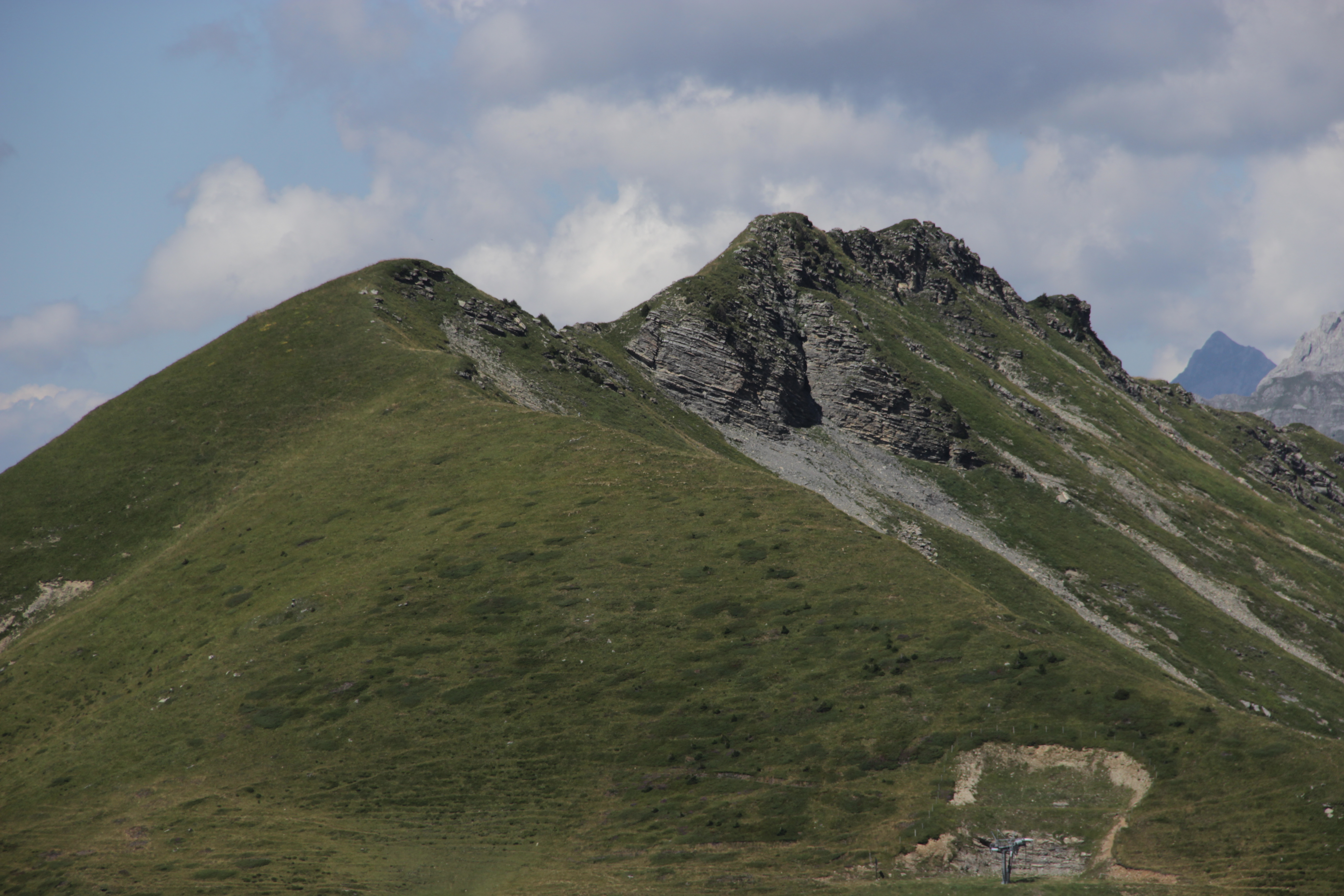
- Floriette and Arnenhorn seen from La Palette .

Highest point
- Elevation: 2,211 m (7,254 ft)
- Prominence: 134 m (440 ft)
- Parent peak: Le Tarent
- Coordinates: 46°22′51″N 7°11′38″E

Geography
- Location within Switzerland
- Location: Vaud/Bern, Switzerland
- Parent range: Vaud Alps

The Arnenhorn is a mountain of the Bernese Alps, located on the border between the Swiss cantons of Vaud and Bern. It overlooks the Arnensee on its eastern side.
