= Bortelsee =

- Location within Canton of Valais Location within Piedmont Location within Switzerland Location within Italy Location within Alps
- Interactive map of Bortelsee
- Location: Valais
- Coordinates: 46°17′15″N 8°06′30″E
- Type: reservoir
- Basin countries: Switzerland
- Surface area: 14 ha (35 acres)
- Water volume: 3.66 million cubic metres (2,970 acre⋅ft)

Bortelsee is a reservoir in the municipality of Brig in the canton of Valais, Switzerland. Its dam was built in 1989.

== See also ==
- List of mountain lakes of Switzerland
