= Lago della Crosa =

Lake in Ticino, Switzerland

- Location within Canton of Ticino Location within Piedmont Location within Italy Location within Switzerland Location within Alps
- Interactive map of Lago della Crosa
- Location: Ticino
- Coordinates: 46°22′20″N 8°29′16″E
- Catchment area: 1.94 km^{2} (0.75 sq mi)
- Basin countries: Switzerland
- Surface area: 17 ha (42 acres) (upper)
- Max. depth: 70 m (230 ft)
- Surface elevation: 2,153 m (7,064 ft)

Lago della Crosa (or rather as Laghi della Crosa) are a pair of lakes in the canton of Ticino, Switzerland. The upper Lago della Crosa, located at an elevation of 2,153 m, has a surface area of 17 ha (42 acres). The lower lake, at an elevation of 2,116 m, has an area of 7 ha (17 acres).

== See also ==
- List of mountain lakes of Switzerland
