= Pizzo Barone =

Mountain in Switzerland

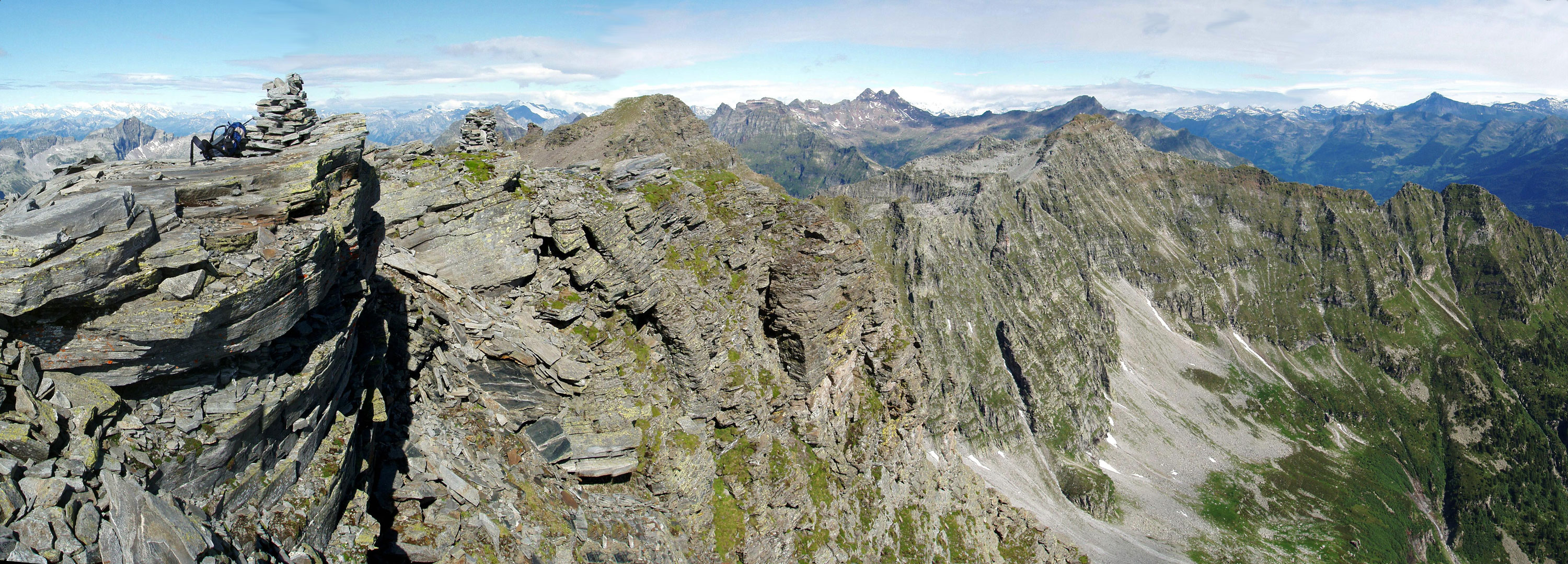
- View from Pizzo Cramosino to Pizzo Barone (background centre)

Highest point
- Elevation: 2,864 m (9,396 ft)
- Prominence: 119 m (390 ft)
- Parent peak: Pizzo Campo Tencia
- Coordinates: 46°24′21″N 8°44′32″E

Geography
- Location within Switzerland
- Location: Ticino, Switzerland
- Parent range: Lepontine Alps

Pizzo Barone (2,864 m) is a mountain of the Lepontine Alps in Switzerland. It is located south of Pizzo Campo Tencia and is the highest summit of the Valle Verzasca in the canton of Ticino. From Sonogno a trail leads to the summit.

South of the peak is a small lake (2,391 m) named Lago Barone.
