= Cima Bianca =

Mountain in Switzerland

- Location within Switzerland

Highest point
- Elevation: 2,612 m (8,570 ft)
- Prominence: 309 m (1,014 ft)
- Parent peak: Madom Gröss
- Coordinates: 46°23′16.7″N 8°48′44.5″E

Geography
- Location: Ticino, Switzerland
- Parent range: Lepontine Alps

The Cima Bianca is a mountain of the Lepontine Alps, overlooking Giornico in the canton of Ticino. On the northern side lies a small lake named Laghetto.
