= Pizzo Fiorèra =

Mountain in Switzerland

- Bedriolhorn
- Location within Alps

Highest point
- Elevation: 2,921 m (9,583 ft)
- Prominence: 254 m (833 ft)
- Parent peak: Basòdino
- Coordinates: 46°22′48″N 8°28′00″E

Geography
- Location: Piedmont, Italy/Ticino, Switzerland
- Parent range: Lepontine Alps

Pizzo Fiorèra (also known as Bedriolhorn) is a mountain of the Lepontine Alps on the Swiss-Italian border. It is located south of the Basòdino, on the chain that separates the Italian Val Formazza from the Swiss Val Bavona.
