= Hiendertelltihorn =

Mountain in Switzerland

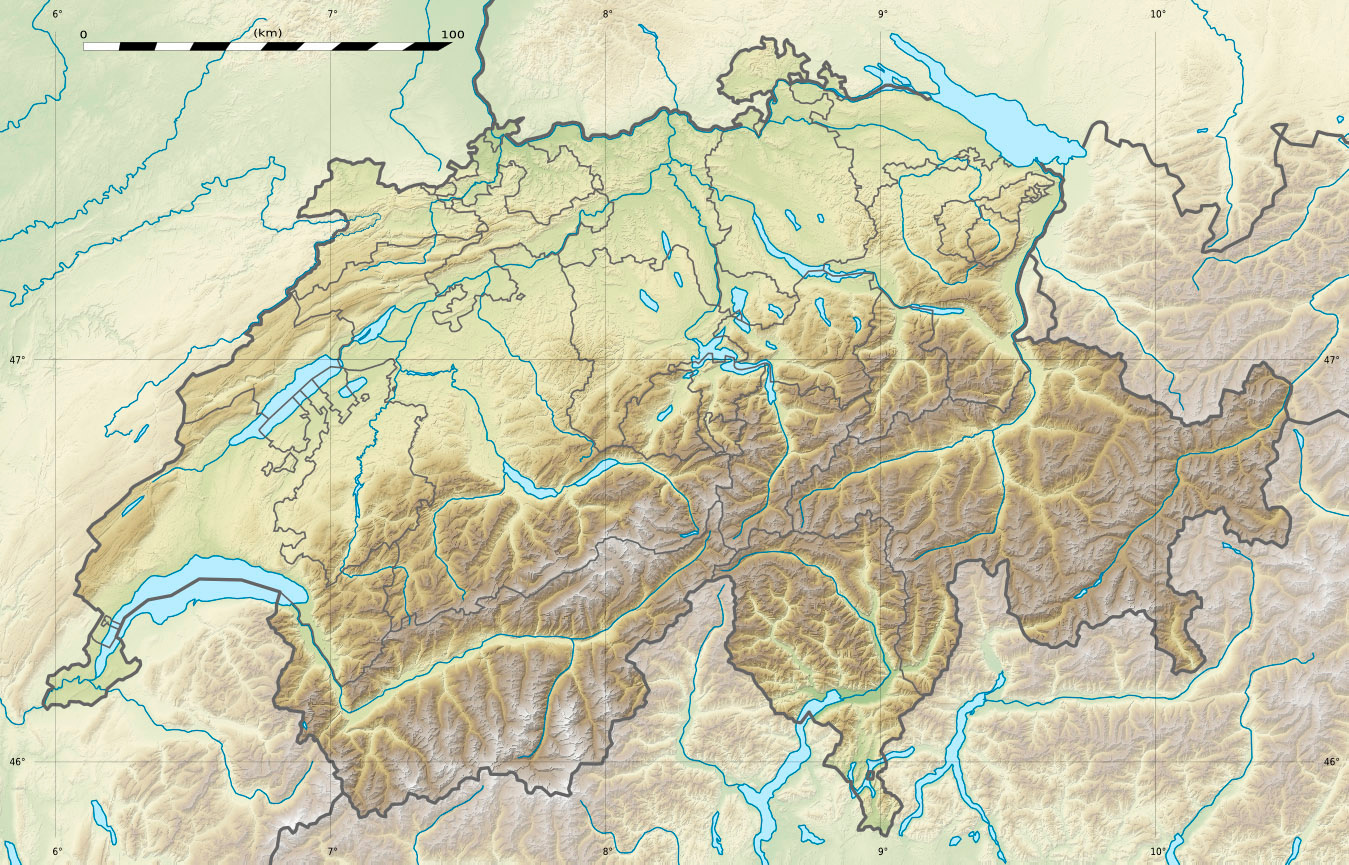

Highest point
- Elevation: 3,180 m (10,430 ft)
- Prominence: 130 m (430 ft)
- Parent peak: Bächlistock
- Coordinates: 46°36′0.6″N 8°14′13.2″E

Geography
- Location within Switzerland
- Location: Bern, Switzerland
- Parent range: Bernese Alps

The Hiendertelltihorn is a mountain of the Bernese Alps, located west of Handegg in the canton of Bern. It lies between the Gauli Glacier and the Grueben Glacier.
