= Bärglistock =

Mountain of the Bernese Alps

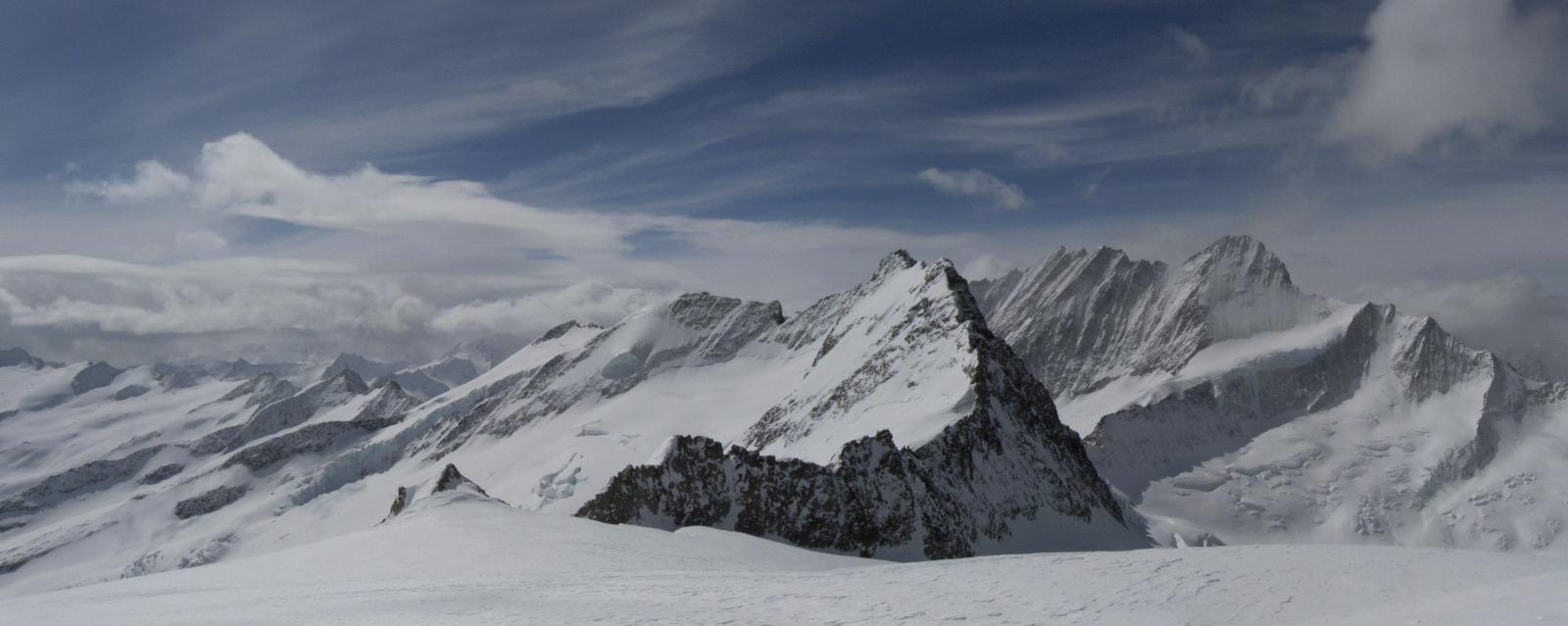
- The Bärglistock (centre right) and Ankenbälli (centre left) from the north side

Highest point
- Elevation: 3,655 m (11,991 ft)
- Prominence: 223 m (732 ft)
- Parent peak: Mittelhorn
- Coordinates: 46°36′56″N 8°8′27″E

Geography
- Location within Switzerland
- Location: Bern, Switzerland
- Parent range: Bernese Alps

The Bärglistock (also spelled Berglistock) (3,655 m) is a mountain of the Bernese Alps, located east of Grindelwald in the Bernese Oberland. The mountain is the tripoint between the valleys of the Upper Grindelwald Glacier, the Unteraar Glacier and the Gauli Glacier. Southeast of Bärglistock, separated by a deep notch, lies the Sub-Peak Ankenbälli (3,601 m).
