= Pizzo Campolungo =

Mountain in Switzerland

- Location within Switzerland

Highest point
- Elevation: 2,713 m (8,901 ft)
- Prominence: 167 m (548 ft)
- Parent peak: Pizzo Campo Tencia
- Coordinates: 46°27′33.6″N 8°43′9.6″E

Geography
- Location: Ticino, Switzerland
- Parent range: Lepontine Alps

Pizzo Campolungo is a mountain of the Lepontine Alps, overlooking Prato and Dalpe in the Leventina valley of the canton of Ticino. It lies just south of the Campolungo Pass.
