= Moosjisee =

Reservoir in Valais, Switzerland

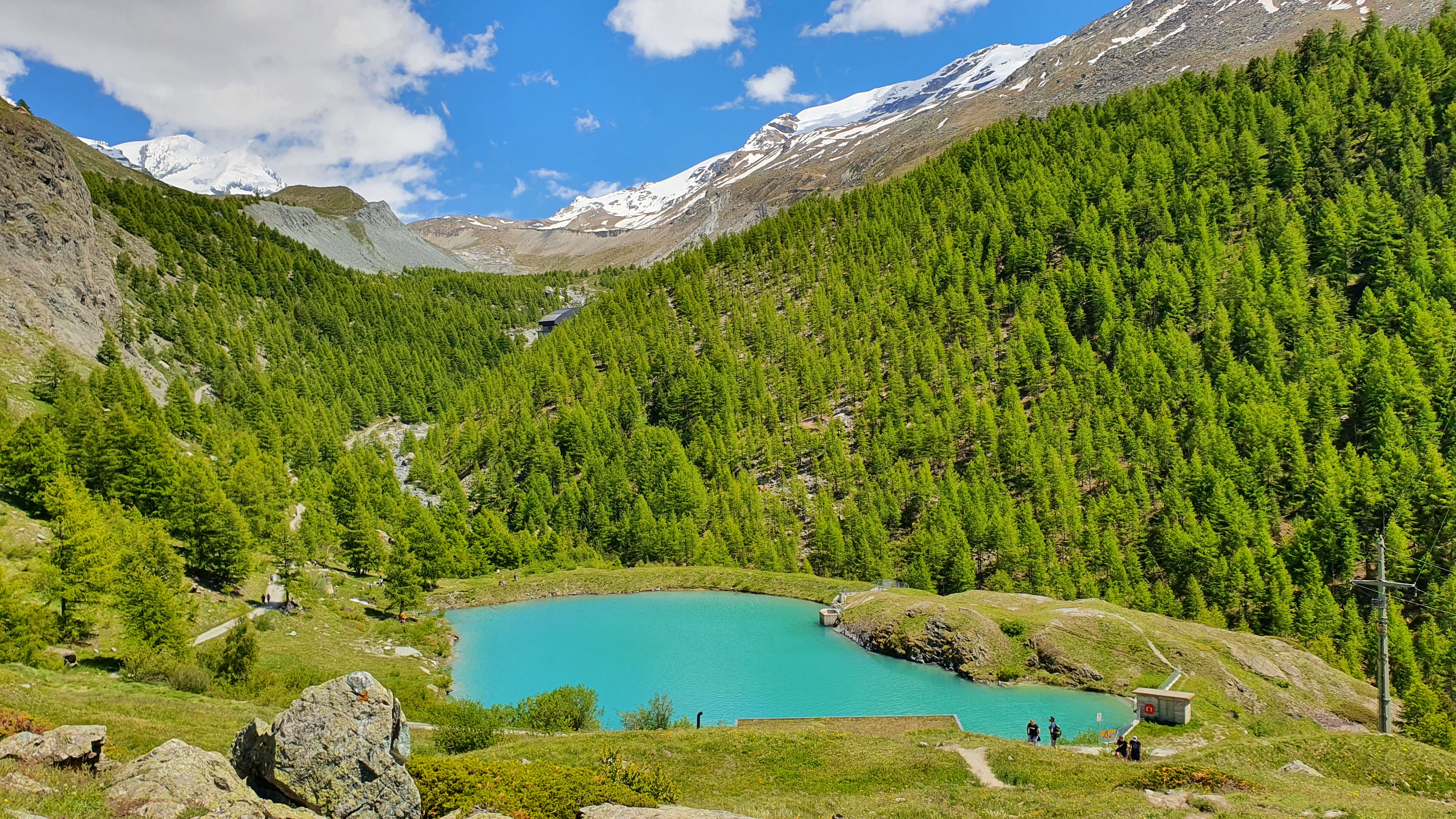

- Location within Canton of Valais Location within Aosta Valley Location within Piedmont Location within Switzerland Location within Italy Location within Alps
- Interactive map of Moosjisee
- Location: Zermatt, Valais
- Coordinates: 46.01038°N 7.77962°E
- Primary outflows: tributary to the Findelbach
- Basin countries: Switzerland
- Surface elevation: 2,139 m (7,018 ft)

The Moosjisee (also Mossjesee, Mosjesee, Moosjesee) is an artificial reservoir in the Findeltal valley above Zermatt in the Swiss canton of Valais. The lake is located at an elevation of 2,139 m (7,018 ft) slightly north of the Findelbach river. Swimming is not allowed due to safety reasons.

The reservoir is used for power generation and snowmaking. It is fed in part by the glacial milk of the Findel Glacier and therefore gets its characteristic milky turquoise color.

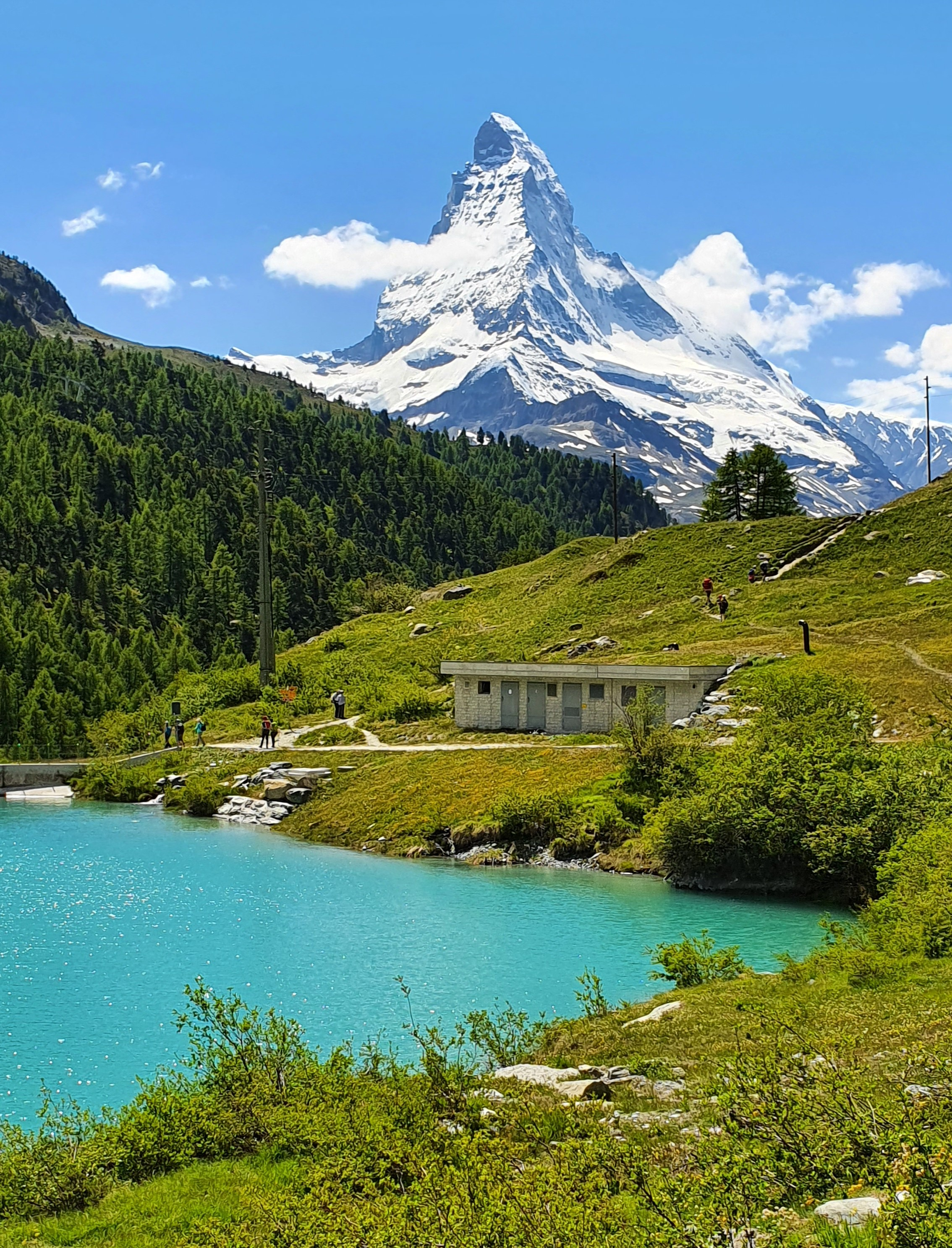
Moosjisee with Matterhorn

== Access ==
Moosjisee is the second to last of the five lakes on the Five Lakes Walk, which leads from Blauherd to Sunnegga.
