= Pizzo Taneda =

Mountain in Switzerland

- Location within Switzerland

Highest point
- Elevation: 2,667 m (8,750 ft)
- Prominence: 190 m (620 ft)
- Parent peak: Piz Gannaretsch
- Coordinates: 46°33′30.4″N 8°42′08.6″E

Geography
- Location: Ticino, Switzerland
- Parent range: Lepontine Alps

Pizzo Taneda is a mountain of the Lepontine Alps, overlooking the Lago Ritom in the Swiss canton of Ticino. It lies between the valleys of Piora and Cadlimo and on the main Alpine watershed between the basin of the Rhine and that of the Ticino.
