= List of dams and reservoirs in Switzerland =

List of lakes with a dam in Switzerland with a volume of more than 10 million cubic metres (m^{3}):

Dammed lakes with their location, volume, area and depth, as well as information on the relevant dam(s)
Name of lake	Canton	Volume in million m^{3}	Surface elevation (m)	Surface area in km^{2}	Maximal depth (m)	Name of dam	Type of dam	Year of construction	Height of dam (m)
Lac des Dix	Valais	**401**	2365	3.65	**227**	Grande Dixence	Gravity	1961	**285**
Lac des Dix	Valais	**401**	2365	3.65	**227**	Dixence	Gravity	1935	87
Lac d'Emosson	Valais	227	1930	3.27	161	Emosson	Arch	1974	180
Lac d'Emosson	Valais	227	1930	3.27	161	Barberine	Gravity	1925	79
Lac de la Gruyère	Fribourg	220	677	9.60	75	Rossens	Arch	1947	83
Lac de Mauvoisin	Valais	211	1961	2.08	180	Mauvoisin	Arch	1957	250
Lago di Lei	Italy, Grisons	197	1931	4.12	133	Valle di Lei Dam	Arch	1961	141
Lago di Livigno	Italy, Grisons	165	1805	4.71	119	Punt dal Gall	Arch	1968	130
Wägitalersee	Schwyz	150	900	4.18	65	Schräh	Gravity	1924	111
Lago di Luzzone	Ticino	108	1592	1.27	181	Luzzone	Arch	1963	225
Lago di Vogorno	Ticino	105	**470**	1.68	204	Verzasca	Arch	1965	220
Grimselsee	Bern	103	1908	2.63	100	Spitallamm	Arch	1932	114
Mattmarksee	Valais	101	2197	1.76	93	Mattmark	Embankment	1967	120
Zervreilasee	Grisons	101	1862	1.61	140	Zervreila	Arch	1957	151
Sihlsee	Schwyz	97	889	**10.72**	23	Hühnermatt	Embankment	1937	17
Sihlsee	Schwyz	97	889	**10.72**	23	In den Schlagen	Gravity	1936	33
Limmerensee	Glarus	93	1857	1.36	122	Limmern	Arch	1963	146
Lac de Moiry	Valais	78	2249	1.40	120	Moiry	Arch	1958	148
Göscheneralpsee	Uri	76	1792	1.32	106	Göscheneralp	Embankment	1960	155
Albignasee	Grisons	71	2163	1.13	108	Albigna	Gravity	1959	115
Lai da Sontga Maria	Grisons	67	1908	1.77	86	Santa Maria	Arch	1968	117
Schiffenensee	Fribourg	66	532	4.25	38	Schiffenen	Arch	1963	47
Lago del Sambuco	Ticino	63	1461	1.11	124	Sambuco	Arch	1956	130
Oberaarsee	Bern	61	2303	1.47	90	Oberaar	Gravity	1953	100
Lai da Marmorera	Grisons	60	1680	1.41	65	Marmorera (Castiletto)	Embankment	1954	91
Klöntalersee	Glarus	56	847	3.29	47	Rhodannenberg	Embankment	**1910**	30
Lago Ritom	Ticino	54	1850	1.49	69	Piora	Gravity	1920	27
Lac de l'Hongrin	Vaud	53	1255	1.60	105	Hongrin Nord	Arch	1969	125
Lac de l'Hongrin	Vaud	53	1255	1.60	105	Hongrin Sud	Arch	1969	90
Lac de Tseuzier	Valais	51	1777	0.85	140	Proz-Riond	Embankment	1957	20
Lac de Tseuzier	Valais	51	1777	0.85	140	Zeuzier	Arch	1957	156
Lai da Nalps	Grisons	45	1908	0.91	122	Nalps	Arch	1962	127
Lai da Curnera	Grisons	41	1956	0.81	136	Curnera	Arch	1966	153
Lac de Salanfe	Valais	40	1925	1.62	48	Salanfe	Gravity	1952	52
Gigerwaldsee	St.-Gallen	36	1335	0.71	135	Gigerwald	Arch	**1976**	147
Lago del Narèt	Ticino	32	2310	0.73	104	Naret I	Arch	1970	80
Lago del Narèt	Ticino	32	2310	0.73	104	Naret II	Gravity	1970	45
Lago dei Cavagnöö	Ticino	29	2310	0.46	100	Cavagnoli	Arch	1968	111
Räterichsbodensee	Bern	27	1767	0.67	77	Räterichsboden	Gravity	1950	94
Lago di Lucendro	Ticino	25	2134	0.54	96	Lucendro	Buttress	1947	73
Wohlensee	Bern	25	480	3.65	**20**	Mühleberg	Gravity	1920	29
Lac de Moron	Neuchâtel, France	21	716	0.69	59	Châtelot	Arch	1953	74
Lac des Toules	Valais	20	1810	0.61	75	Les Toules	Arch	1963	86
Lac de Cleuson	Valais	20	2186	0.51	76	Cleuson	Gravity	1950	87
Griessee	Valais	19	**2386**	0.50	66	Gries	Gravity	1965	60
Lago Bianco	Grisons	19	2234	1.50	53	Lago Biango Nord	Gravity	1912	**15**
Lago Bianco	Grisons	19	2234	1.50	53	Lago Biango Süd	Gravity	1912	26
Sufnersee	Grisons	18	1401	0.90	51	Sufers	Arch	1962	58
Gelmersee	Bern	14	1850	0.64	48	Gelmer	Gravity	1929	35
Lac du Vieux Emosson	Valais	14	2205	0.55	42	Vieux-Emosson	Arch	1955	45
Lac de Montsalvens	Fribourg	13	801	0.74	50	Montsalvens	Arch	1920	55
Arnensee	Bern	**11**	1543	**0.45**	50	Arnensee	Embankment	1942	17

Values in bold are the extreme values (e.g., highest and lowest) of the particular column.

== Problems and challenges ==
Hydroelectric power plants in the Alps are sometimes located on unstable mountain slopes. Melting glaciers (with landslides like the one in Blatten in May 2025), heavy rainfall, and flooding also pose challenges. Water resource management has gained importance.

== See also ==
- List of tallest dams in Switzerland
- List of lakes of Switzerland
- List of mountain lakes of Switzerland
