= List of highest paved roads in Switzerland =

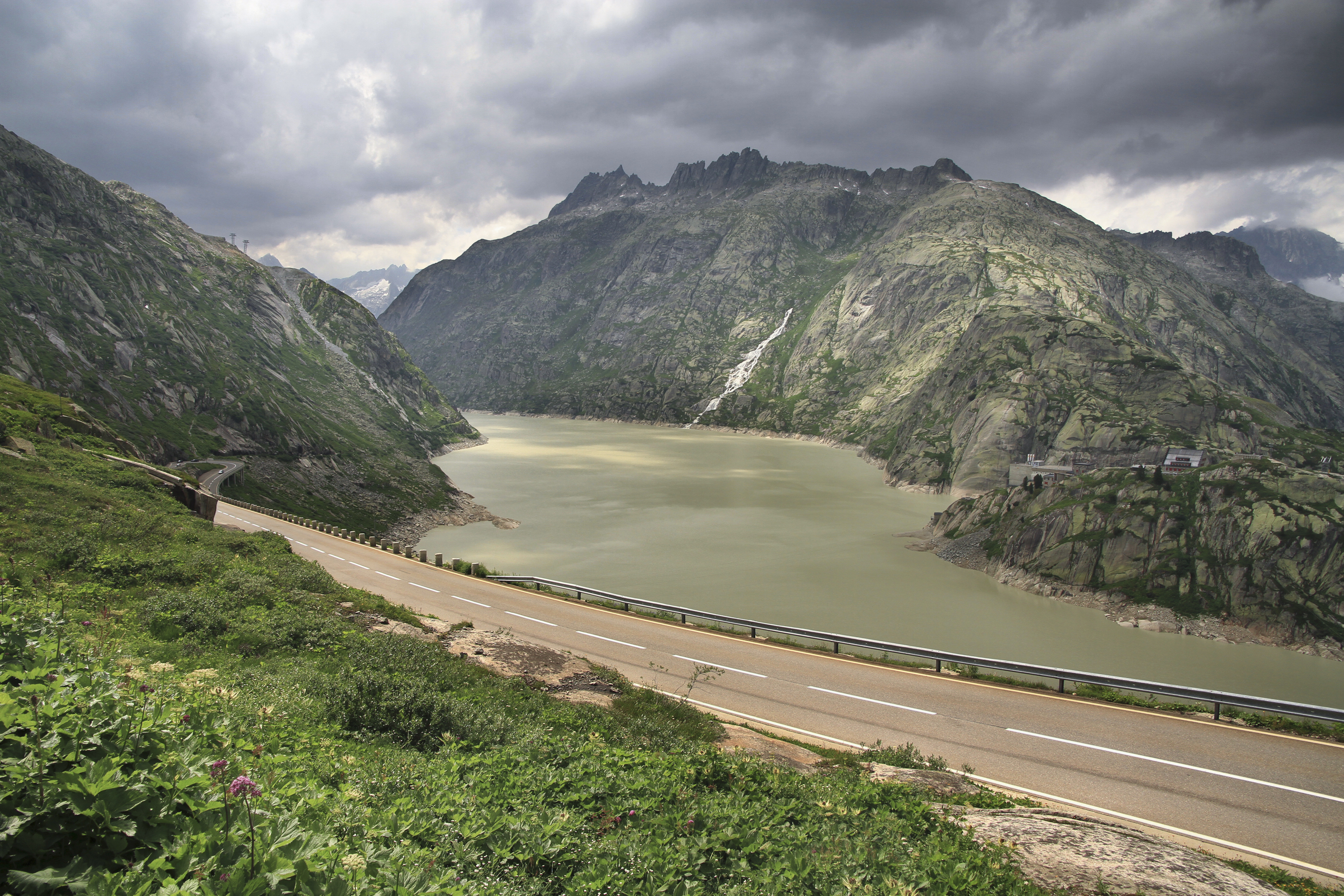
The Grimsel Pass road

This is a list of the highest paved roads in Switzerland. It includes paved roads in the Alps that are over 1 kilometre (0.62 miles) long and whose culminating point is over 1,850 metres (6,070 feet) above sea level. This height approximately corresponds to that of the highest major settlements in the country. Some of the listed roads are closed to motorised vehicles, although they are normally all accessible to pedestrians and cyclists. These mountain roads are popular with drivers, bikers and cyclists for their spectacular scenery and are often the highlights of bicycle races such as Tour de Suisse and Tour de Romandie. Many of them are also served by public transport, the main transport company being PostBus Switzerland.

As the tree line lies at approximately 2,000 metres in the Alps, almost all the upper sections of the listed roads are in the alpine zone, where the main form of precipitation becomes snow. Most of these roads are closed in winter, although important road links such as the Simplon remain open through the year.

This list does not include any motorway as the three highest motorways (San Bernardino Tunnel, Gotthard Road Tunnel and Vue des Alpes Tunnel) are below 1,700 metres. For a list including only road passes, see list of highest road passes in Switzerland.

== List ==
Road	Highest elevation	Canton(s)	Itinerary (highest point)	Highest point	Type	Notes
Umbrail	2,501 m (8,205 ft)	Graubünden	Santa Maria Val Müstair–Umbrail Pass–Bormio (IT)	46°32′35″N 10°26′02″E	Pass	
Nufenen	2,478 m (8,130 ft)	Ticino/Valais	Bedretto–Nufenen Pass–Ulrichen	46°28′41″N 08°23′35″E	Pass	Only road between the cantons of Ticino and Valais
Great St Bernard (pass road)	2,469 m (8,100 ft)	Valais	Bourg-Saint-Pierre–Great St Bernard Pass–Saint Oyen (IT)	45°52′08″N 7°10′14″E	Pass	
Furka	2,429 m (7,969 ft)	Uri/Valais	Realp–Furka Pass–Oberwald	46°34′22″N 08°25′00″E	Pass	Only road between the cantons of Valais and Uri
Grimsel Panoramastrasse	2,390 m (7,841 ft)	Bern	Grimsel Pass–Stierenberg–Oberaarsee	46°33′08″N 08°16′48″E	Dead-end	
Moiry	2,389 m (7,838 ft)	Valais	Grimentz–Lac de Moiry–Lac de Châteaupré	46°06′24″N 07°34′44″E	Dead-end	
Griessee	2,387 m (7,831 ft)	Valais	Nufenen Pass road–Griessee	46°27′44″N 08°22′22″E	Dead-end	Starting point on the Nufenen Pass road (p. 2,303 m)
Flüela	2,383 m (7,818 ft)	Graubünden	Davos–Flüela Pass–Susch	46°45′01″N 09°56′52″E	Pass	
Alp Anarosa	2,340 m (7,677 ft)	Graubünden	Wergenstein–Tguma Parkplatz	46°37′26″N 09°21′51″E	Dead-end	
Bernina	2,329 m (7,641 ft)	Graubünden	Pontresina–Bernina Pass–Poschiavo	46°24.744′N 10°1.71′E	Pass	Also a railway pass (2,253 m); only road between the valley of Poschiavo and the rest of the country
Livigno	2,315 m (7,595 ft)	Graubünden	Poschiavo–Livigno Pass–Livigno (IT)	46°26′33″N 10°03′25″E	Pass	
Albula	2,315 m (7,595 ft)	Graubünden	Bergün–Albula Pass–La Punt	46°35′N 09°53′E	Pass	Railway tunnel below the pass
Val Sambuco	2,311 m (7,582 ft)	Ticino	Fusio–Lago del Narèt	46°28′47″N 8°34′31″E	Dead-end	
Robièi	2,310 m (7,579 ft)	Ticino	Robièi–Lago dei Cavagnöö	46°27′19″N 08°30′30″E	Dead-end	Only accessible by aerial tramway (lowest point: 1,856 m)
Julier	2,284 m (7,493 ft)	Graubünden	Bivio–Julier Pass–Silvaplana	46°28.32′N 09°43.74′E	Pass	
Susten	2,264 m (7,428 ft)	Bern/Uri	Gadmen–Susten Pass–Wassen	46°43.8′N 08°26.94′E	Pass	Road tunnel at 2,224 m, dead-end road to the summit of the pass on the Bernese side; only road between the cantons of Bern and Uri
Lago della Sella dam	2,257 m (7,405 ft)	Ticino	Gotthard Pass Hospice–Lago della Sella	46°33′33″N 08°35′34″E	Dead-end	
Sanetsch	2,252 m (7,388 ft)	Valais	Conthey or Savièse–Sanetsch Pass–Lac de Sanetsch	46°19′51″N 07°17′10″E	Dead-end	Road ends at Lac de Sanetsch
Passo Scimfuss	2,242 m (7,356 ft)	Ticino	Gotthard Pass Hospice–Passo Scimfuss	46°32′35″N 08°35′28″E	Dead-end	
Alpe Galm	2,231 m (7,320 ft)	Valais	Guttet–Galm	46°21′23″N 07°40′52″E	Dead-end	
Männlichen	2,224 m (7,297 ft)	Bern	Grindelwald–Männlichen Station	46°36′41″N 07°56′33″E	Dead-end	
Emosson	2,206 m (7,238 ft)	Valais	Finhaut–Lac d'Emosson–Lac du Vieux Emosson	46°03′47″N 06°53′56″E	Dead-end	Public road to Emosson dam (1,965 m), limited access to Vieux Emosson dam
Täschalp	2,205 m (7,234 ft)	Valais	Täsch–Täschalp	46°03′30″N 07°48′45″E	Dead-end	
Mattmark	2,203 m (7,228 ft)	Valais	Saas-Almagell–Mattmarksee	46°03′01″N 07°57′50″E	Dead-end	
Croix de Coeur	2,173 m (7,129 ft)	Valais	Verbier–Croix de Coeur	46°07′18″N 07°13′57″E	Dead-end	Gravel road from La Tsoumaz side
Grimsel	2,164 m (7,100 ft)	Bern/Valais	Guttannen–Grimsel Pass–Oberwald	46°33.72′N 8°20.34′E	Pass	Only paved road between the cantons of Bern and Valais
Ofen/Fuorn	2,149 m (7,051 ft)	Graubünden	Zernez–Ofen Pass–Tschierv	46°38.472′N 10°17.598′E	Pass	Only paved road between the Val Müstair and the rest of the country
Val des Dix	2,141 m (7,024 ft)	Valais	Hérémence or Euseigne–Grande Dixence	46°05′03″N 07°24′13″E	Dead-end	Paved road ends at Le Chargeur, at the foot of the dam
Nagens	2,134 m (7,001 ft)	Graubünden	Laax–Nagen	46°51′42″N 09°13′50″E	Dead-end	
Avers	2,124 m (6,969 ft)	Graubünden	Ausserferrera–Juf	46°26′45″N 09°34′45″E	Dead-end	Road to the highest settlement in Europe
Splügen	2,117 m (6,946 ft)	Graubünden	Splügen–Splügen Pass–Campodolcino (IT)	46°30.36′N 09°20.22′E	Pass	
Val d'Arolla	2,107 m (6,913 ft)	Valais	Les Haudères–Arolla	46°01′33″N 07°28′39″E	Dead-end	Highest point above Arolla
Gotthard (main pass road)	2,106 m (6,909 ft)	Ticino/Uri	Airolo–Gotthard Pass–Hospenthal	46.559167°N 08.561389°E	Pass	Highest point on the Uri side: 1,903 m
Gotthard (Tremola road)	2,106 m (6,909 ft)	Ticino/Uri	Airolo (Motto Bartola)–Gotthard Pass–Hospenthal (Brüggloch)	46.559167°N 08.561389°E	Pass	Historical road mostly paved with granite stones, highest point on the Uri side: 1,903 m
Lauchernalp	2,102 m (6,896 ft)	Valais	Wiler (Lötschen)–Lauchernalp	46°24′54″N 07°46′15″E	Dead-end	
Weritzalp	2,099 m (6,886 ft)	Valais	Wiler (Lötschen)–Weritzalp	46°25′18″N 07°47′33″E	Dead-end	
Thyon	2,095 m (6,873 ft)	Valais	Hérémence–Thyon	46°10′55″N 07°22′21″E	Dead-end	
Stein Glacier	2,090 m (6,857 ft)	Bern	Hotel Steingletscher–Parkplatz	46°42′48″N 08°24′58″E	Dead-end	Starting point on the Susten Pass road (1,865 m), end at the foot of the western Stein Glacier tongue
Mandelon	2,068 m (6,785 ft)	Valais	Hérémence–Mandelon	46°07′52″N 07°24′41″E	Dead-end	
San Bernardino	2,065 m (6,775 ft)	Graubünden	Hinterrhein–San Bernardino Pass–San Bernardino	46.496111°N 9.170833°E	Pass	
Valle di Campo	2,064 m (6,772 ft)	Graubünden	Poschiavo (Sfazù)–Alpe Campo	46°24′05″N 10°07′07″E	Dead-end	
Steinigboda	2,049 m (6,722 ft)	Graubünden	Nufenen–Steinigboda	46°33′17″N 09°14′31″E	Dead-end	
Moosalp	2,048 m (6,719 ft)	Valais	Bürchen–Moosalp–Törbel	46°15′05″N 07°49′47″E	Pass	
Salastrains	2,048 m (6,719 ft)	Graubünden	St. Moritz–Salastrains	46°29′58″N 09°49′43″E	Dead-end	
Oberalp	2,046 m (6,713 ft)	Graubünden/Uri	Sedrun–Oberalp Pass–Andermatt	46.659°N 8.671°E	Pass	Also a railway pass
Marguns	2,040 m (6,693 ft)	Graubünden	St. Moritz–Suvretta–Marguns	46°29′23″N 09°48′59″E	Dead-end	
Curnera	2,039 m (6,690 ft)	Graubünden	Tschamut (Surpalits)–Lai da Curnera	46°38′16″N 08°42′25″E	Dead-end	Highest point west of Lai da Curnera dam
Bettmeralp	2,037 m (6,683 ft)	Valais	Riederalp–Bettmeralp	46°23′45″N 08°03′56″E	Dead-end	Limited access (both Riederalp and Bettmeralp are car-free resorts accessible only by aerial tramway), culminating point above Bettmersee
Bussalp	2,022 m (6,634 ft)	Bern	Grindelwald–Oberläger	46°39′24″N 07°59′22″E	Dead-end	
Val Camadra	2,012 m (6,601 ft)	Ticino	Campo Blenio–Pian Geirett	46°36′16″N 08°56′04″E	Dead-end	
Mittler Hütte	2,010 m (6,594 ft)	Graubünden	Arosa–Mittler Hütte	46°47′11″N 09°39′45″E	Dead-end	
Dischma	2,007 m (6,585 ft)	Graubünden	Davos–Dürrboden	46°43′17″N 09°55′19″E	Dead-end	
Simplon (E62)	2,005 m (6,578 ft)	Valais	Brig–Simplon Pass–Simplon	46.251667°N 8.033333°E	Pass	Highest point of the European route network in Europe
Val Pontirone	2,005 m (6,578 ft)	Ticino	Malvaglia–Alpe di Cava	46°21′35″N 09°02′01″E	Dead-end	
Fideriser Heuberge	2,000 m (6,562 ft)	Graubünden	Fideris–Berghaus Arflina	46°51′59″N 09°43′32″E	Dead-end	
Melchsee-Frutt	1,980 m (6,496 ft)	Obwalden	Kerns (Stöckalp)–Melchsee-Frutt–Tannensee–Tannalp	46°46′33″N 08°18′52″E	Dead-end	
Chandolin	1,978 m (6,490 ft)	Valais	Saint-Luc–Chandolin	46°15′13″N 07°35′28″E	Dead-end	
Mauvoisin	1,976 m (6,483 ft)	Valais	Fionnay–Mauvoisin–Mauvoisin Dam	45°59′52″N 07°20′43″E	Dead-end	
Lukmanier	1,973 m (6,473 ft)	Graubünden/Ticino	Disentis–Lukmanier Pass–Blenio	46°34′29″N 08°48′04″E	Pass	Highest point north of Lukmanier Pass, highest point on the Ticino side: 1,915 m
Val Fex	1,973 m (6,473 ft)	Graubünden	Sils Maria–Curtins	46°24′05″N 09°46′32″E	Dead-end	
Mattertal	1,973 m (6,473 ft)	Valais	Zermatt–Furi–Zmutt Stausee	46°00′27″N 07°42′35″E	Dead-end	
Sillerenbühl	1,973 m (6,473 ft)	Bern	Adelboden–Sillerenbühl	46°28′18″N 07°31′04″E	Dead-end	
Nalps	1,967 m (6,453 ft)	Graubünden	Sedrun–Lai da Nalps	46°38′20″N 08°45′57″E	Dead-end	
Giw	1,962 m (6,437 ft)	Valais	Visperterminen–Giw	46°15′20″N 07°55′25″E	Dead-end	
Grosse Scheidegg	1,961 m (6,434 ft)	Bern	Grindelwald–Grosse Scheidegg Pass–Meiringen	46°39′21″N 08°06′07″E	Pass	Limited access
Alp Foppa	1,951 m (6,401 ft)	Graubünden	Salouf–Cre digl Lai–Som igls Mellens	46°36′21″N 09°31′54″E	Dead-end	Unpaved road to Alp Foppa (2,004 m)
Hahnenmoos	1,950 m (6,398 ft)	Bern	Adelboden–Hahnenmoos Pass	46°27′11″N 07°29′42″E	Dead-end	Unpaved road on the Lenk side of the pass
Valle di Lei	1,950 m (6,398 ft)	Graubünden	Innerferrera (Campsut)–Tunnel–Lago di Lei	46°28′59″N 09°26′57″E	Dead-end	
Lavoz	1,950 m (6,398 ft)	Graubünden	Lenzerheide–Lavoz	46°44′36″N 09°31′39″E	Dead-end	
Klausen	1,948 m (6,391 ft)	Uri/Glarus	Unterschächen–Klausen Pass–Linthal	46°52′05″N 08°51′17″E	Pass	Highest point on the Glarus side: 1,310 m
Farur	1,940 m (6,365 ft)	Graubünden	Tschiertschen–Farur	46°47′57″N 09°35′45″E	Dead-end	
Feselalp	1,937 m (6,355 ft)	Valais	Erschmatt–Jeizinen–Untere Feselalp	46°20′26″N 07°43′29″E	Dead-end	Unpaved road to Stafel (2,205 m)
Lü	1,930 m (6,332 ft)	Graubünden	Fuldera–Lü	46°37′26″N 10°22′03″E	Dead-end	
Diemtigtal	1,929 m (6,329 ft)	Bern	Grimmialp–Oberberg	46°32′17″N 07°31′52″E	Dead-end	
Torrentalp	1,928 m (6,325 ft)	Valais	Albinen or Leukerbad–Torrentalp	46°21′42″N 07°38′28″E	Dead-end	
Munter-Ratitsch	1,927 m (6,322 ft)	Graubünden	Salouf–Munter-Ratitsch	46°38′10″N 09°31′58″E	Dead-end	End of paved road between the hamlets of Munter and Ratitsch
Alp Scharmoin	1,922 m (6,306 ft)	Graubünden	Lenzerheide–Alp Scharmoin	46°44′50″N 09°34′32″E	Dead-end	
Great St Bernard (main road)	1,916 m (6,286 ft)	Valais	Martigny–Great St Bernard Tunnel–Aosta (IT)	45°54′10″N 07°11′50″E	Pass	
Alp Flix	1,913 m (6,276 ft)	Graubünden	Sur–Alp Flix	46°31′40″N 09°38′39″E	Dead-end	
Wyssenberg	1,910 m (6,266 ft)	Bern	Lenk–Obers Läger–Wyssenberg	46°28′47″N 07°28′17″E	Dead-end	
Alp Quader	1,906 m (6,253 ft)	Graubünden	Breil/Brigels–Alp Quader	46°47′24″N 09°04′11″E	Dead-end	
Turtmanntal	1,901 m (6,237 ft)	Valais	Oberems–Gruben/Meiden–Vorder Sänntum	46°11′08″N 07°41′45″E	Dead-end	
Radons	1,885 m (6,184 ft)	Graubünden	Parsonz–Radons	46°33′35″N 09°33′04″E	Dead-end	
Alp Grönda	1,883 m (6,178 ft)	Graubünden	Präz–Präzer Alp	46°44′25″N 09°22′56″E	Dead-end	
Ferpècle	1,882 m (6,175 ft)	Valais	Les Haudères–Ferpècle	46°03′35″N 07°32′49″E	Dead-end	
Furggu	1,881 m (6,171 ft)	Valais	Gondo–Zwischbergen–Furggu–Sale	46°10′41″N 08°05′49″E	Dead-end	
Cave du Sex	1,878 m (6,161 ft)	Valais	Aminona–Cave du Sex	46°20′46″N 07°32′19″E	Dead-end	
Milez	1,878 m (6,161 ft)	Graubünden	Sedrun (Rueras)–Milez	46°39′58″N 08°43′08″E	Dead-end	
Rosswald	1,874 m (6,148 ft)	Valais	Ried-Brig–Rosswald	46°18′15″N 08°02′39″E	Dead-end	
Zervreila	1,864 m (6,115 ft)	Graubünden	Vals–Zervreilasee	46°34′37″N 09°07′13″E	Dead-end	
Obermutten	1,863 m (6,112 ft)	Graubünden	Mutten–Obermutten	46°40′21″N 09°29′02″E	Dead-end	
Sertig	1,861 m (6,106 ft)	Graubünden	Davos–Sertig Dörfli	46°43′33″N 09°50′53″E	Dead-end	
Samnaun	1,860 m (6,102 ft)	Graubünden	Martina (Vinadi)–Samnaun	46°56′31″N 10°21′25″E	Dead-end	
Alp Lasa	1,854 m (6,083 ft)	St. Gallen	Bad Ragaz (Valens)–Obersäss	46°58′15″N 09°26′05″E	Dead-end	
Ritom	1,851 m (6,073 ft)	Ticino	Piotta (Altanca)–Lago Ritom	46°32′03″N 08°40′35″E	Dead-end	

== See also ==
- Transport in Switzerland
- List of mountain railways in Switzerland (highest railways in Switzerland)
- List of highest road passes in Switzerland
- Gobba di Rollin - highest location in Switzerland and Europe reached by 4x4 vehicles
- List of highest paved roads in Europe
