= List of tallest dams in Switzerland =

List of dams in Switzerland which are taller than 100 meters:

Name	Canton	Height (meters)	Crest length (meters)	Type	Year of construction	Name of the Lake
Grande Dixence	Valais	285	695	Gravity	1961	Lac des Dix
Mauvoisin	Valais	250	520	Arch	1957	Lac de Mauvoisin
Luzzone	Ticino	225	600	Arch	1963	Lago di Luzzone
Contra (Verzasca Dam)	Ticino	220	380	Arch	1965	Lago di Vogorno
Emosson	Valais	180	555	Arch	1974	Lac d'Emosson
Zeuzier	Valais	156	256	Arch	1957	Lac de Tseuzier
Göscheneralp	Uri	155	540	Embankment	1960	Göscheneralpsee
Curnera	Grisons	153	350	Arch	1966	Lai de Curnera
Zervreila	Grisons	151	504	Arch	1957	Zervreilasee
Moiry	Valais	148	610	Arch	1958	Lac de Moiry
Gigerwald	St. Gallen	147	430	Arch	1976	Gigerwaldsee
Limmern	Glarus	146	375	Arch	1963	Limmerensee
Valle di Lei	Grisons	141	690	Arch	1961	Lago di Lei
Punt dal Gall	Grisons	130	540	Arch	1968	Lago di Livigno
Sambuco	Ticino	130	363	Arch	1956	Lago del Sambuco
Nalps	Grisons	127	480	Arch	1962	Lai da Nalps
Hongrin Nord	Vaud	125	325	Arch	1969	Lac de l'Hongrin
Gebidem	Valais	122	327	Arch	1967	Gebidemsee
Mattmark	Valais	120	780	Embankment	1967	Mattmarksee
Santa Maria	Grisons	117	560	Arch	1968	Lai da Sontga Maria
Albigna	Grisons	115	759	Gravity	1959	Albignasee
Spitallamm	Bern	114	258	Arch	1932	Grimselsee
Cavagnoli	Ticino	111	320	Arch	1968	Lago dei Cavagnöö
Schräh	Schwyz	111	150	Gravity	1924	Wägitalersee
Oberaar	Bern	100	526	Gravity	1953	Oberaarsee

== See also ==
- List of lakes with a dam in Switzerland
- List of tallest dams in the world
