= Panix =

Panix may refer to:

- Panix (ISP), an internet service provider
- Any of several places in the Grisons, Switzerland
  - Pigniu, a village whose German name is Panix
  - Panix Pass, a Swiss Alpine pass
  - Lag da Pigniu, a reservoir (Panixer Stausee in German)
- A misspelling of Panax, a genus of plants.
