= Maggia =

Maggia may refer to:

- Maggia (river), a river in southern Switzerland
- Maggia (municipality), a municipality in southern Switzerland
- Maggia (comics), a fictional crime syndicate in the Marvel Comics universe
