= Engstlensee =

Lake in the municipality of Innertkirchen, Bernese Oberland, Switzerland

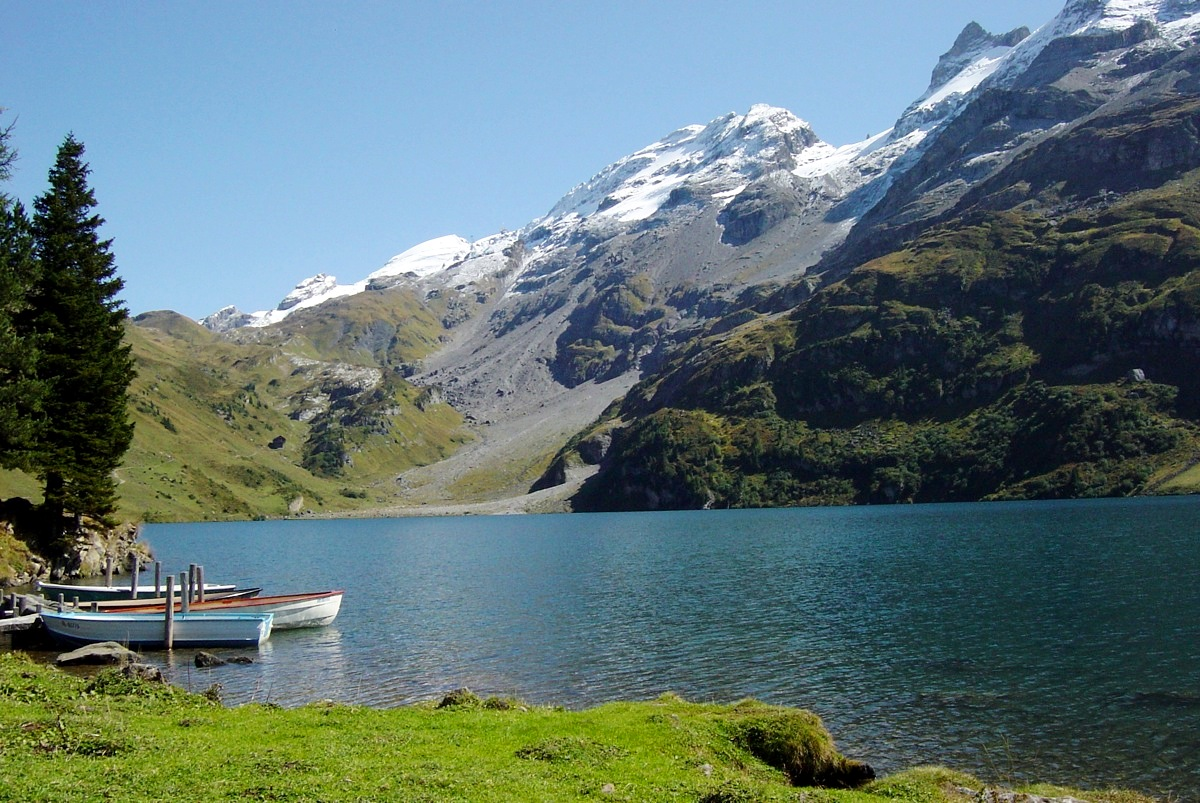

- Location within Canton of Bern Location within Switzerland Location within Alps
- Interactive map of Engstlensee
- Location: Innertkirchen, Bernese Oberland
- Coordinates: 46°46′22″N 8°21′25″E
- Type: reservoir, natural lake
- Basin countries: Switzerland
- Surface area: 0.44 km^{2} (0.17 sq mi)
- Max. depth: 49 m (161 ft)
- Water volume: 10.7 million cubic metres (8,700 acre⋅ft)
- Surface elevation: 1,850.8 m (6,072 ft)

Engstlensee is a natural lake used as a reservoir in the municipality of Innertkirchen, Bernese Oberland, Switzerland. It is located near Joch Pass at an elevation of 1850 m. It can be reached by gondola and by foot from Titlis.

The reservoir has a volume of 10.7 million m³ whereof 2 million m³ are used for electricity production. The lake's surface area is 44 ha (110 acres).

The water of the Engstlensee passes through a tunnel in the neighbouring Gadmental valley before being used in the Fuhren, Hopflauenen and Innertkirchen power stations.

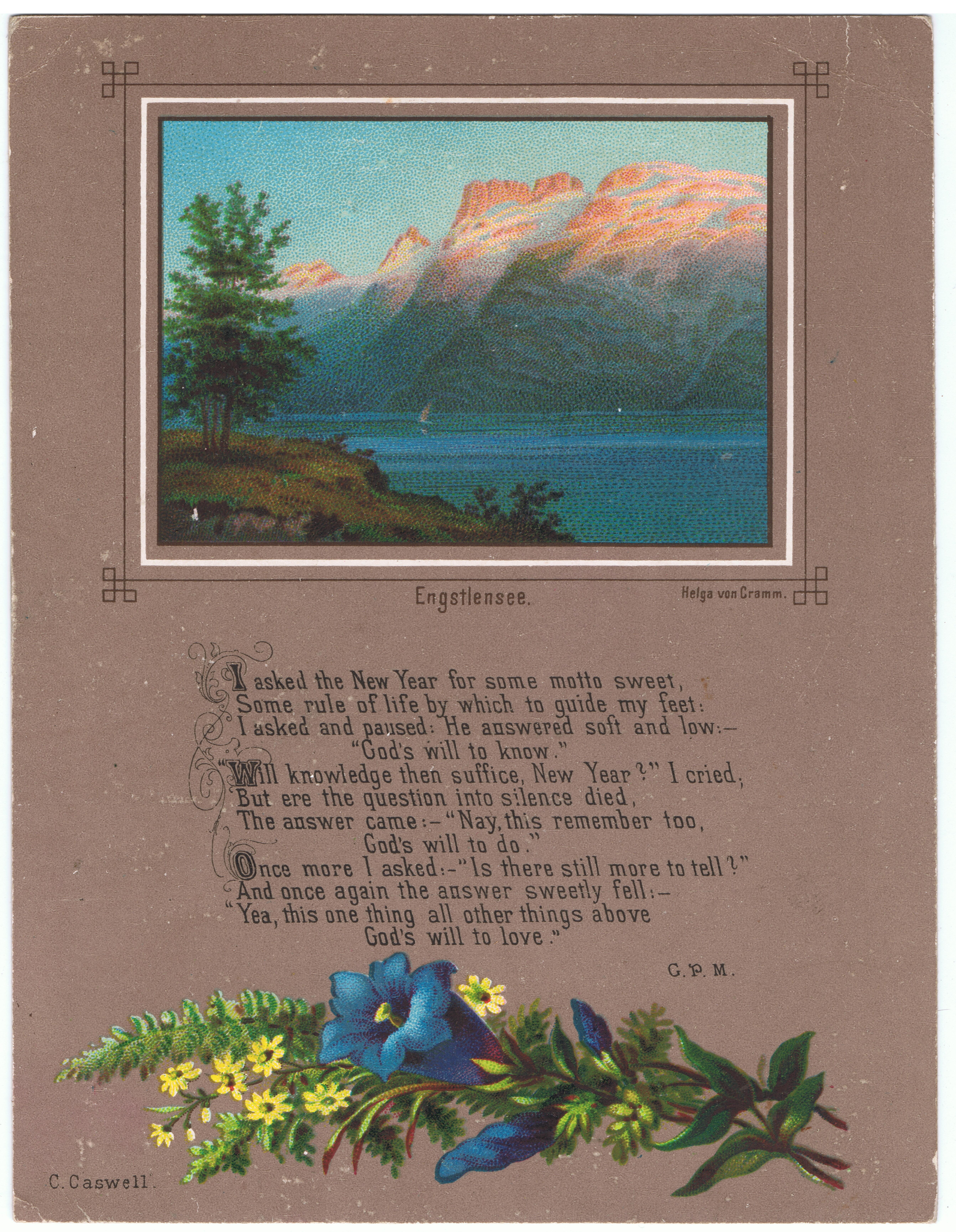
Helga von Cramm, Engstlensee, c. 1880.

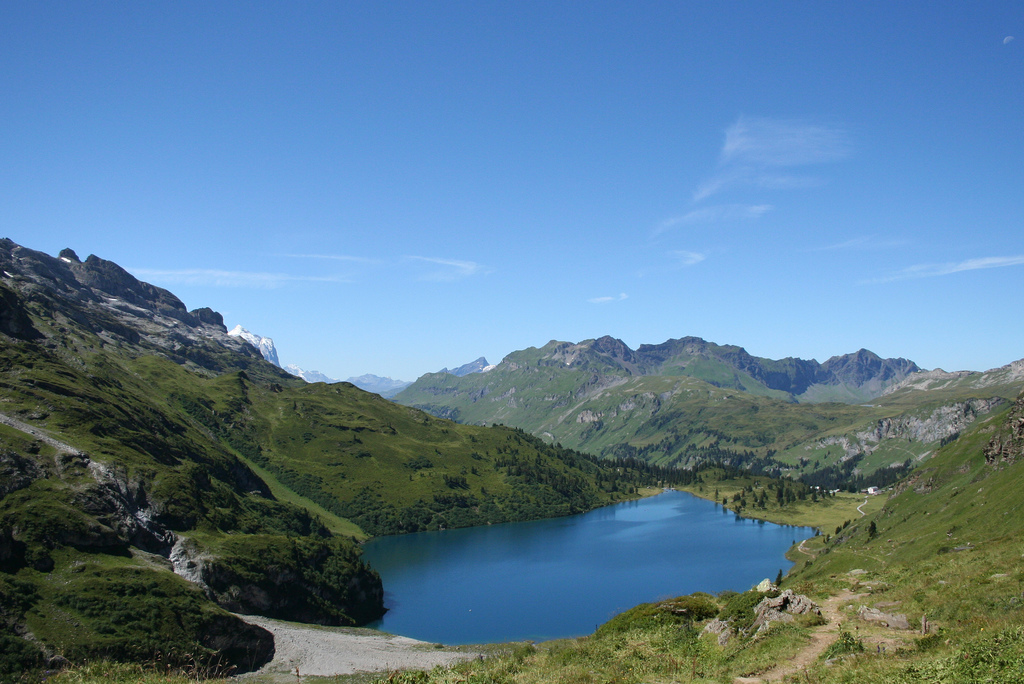

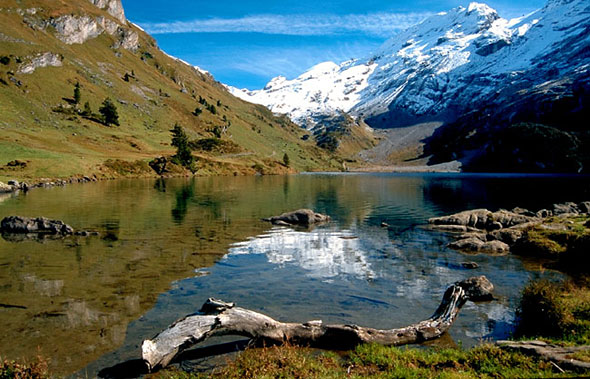

== In Literature ==
An inn on the shore of the Engstlensee is the scene of a crucial meeting between the protagonists of H. G. Wells' 1913 novel The Passionate Friends.

== See also ==
- List of lakes of Switzerland
- List of mountain lakes of Switzerland
