= Maggia (river) =

River in Switzerland

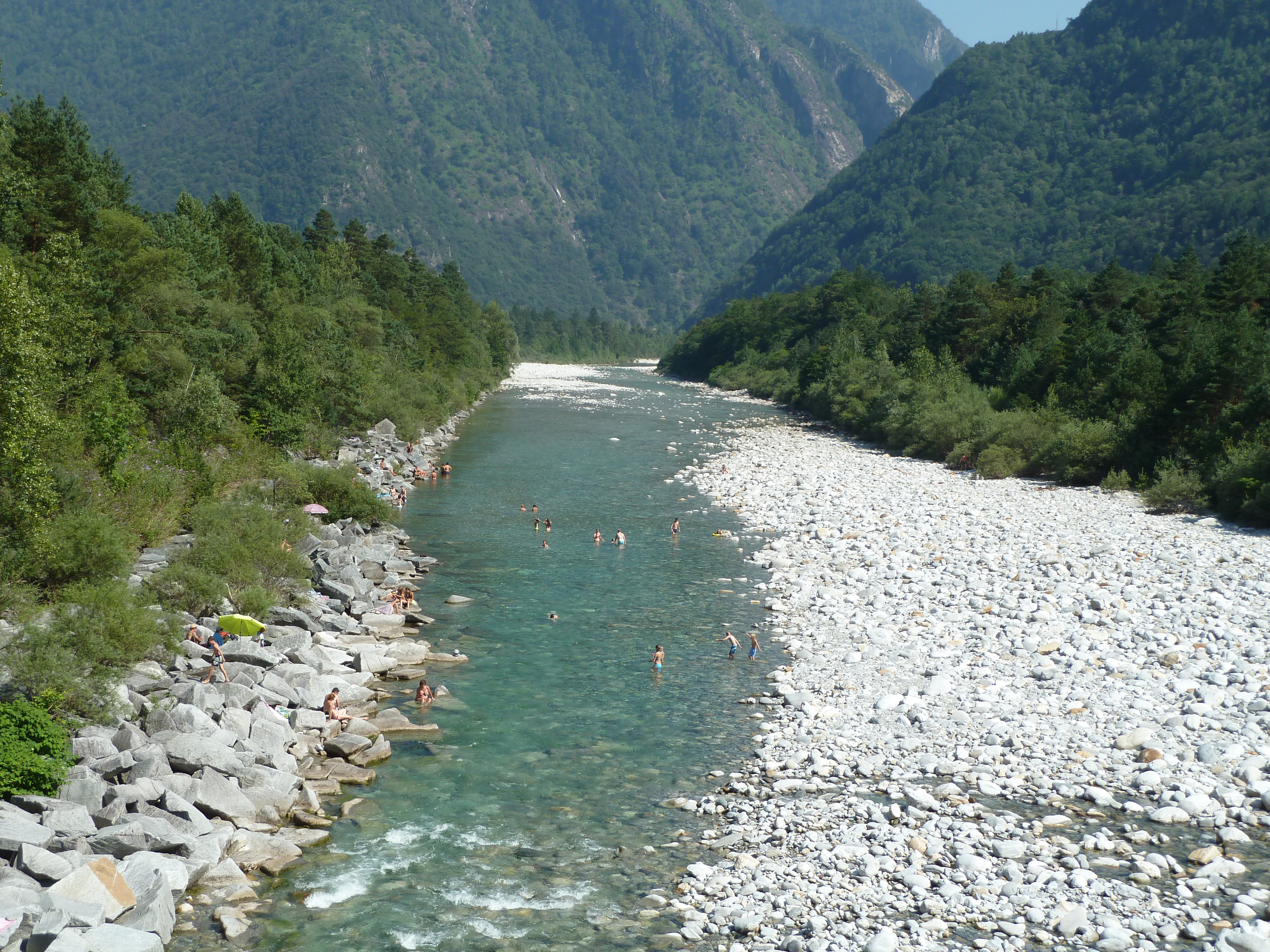
- Maggia, about 1 kilometer from the village Maggia

Location
- Country: Switzerland

Physical characteristics
- Mouth: Lake Maggiore
  - coordinates: 46°09′11″N 8°48′12″E

Basin features
- Progression: Lake Maggiore→ Ticino→ Po→ Adriatic Sea
- Tributaries
  - right: Melezzo Orientale

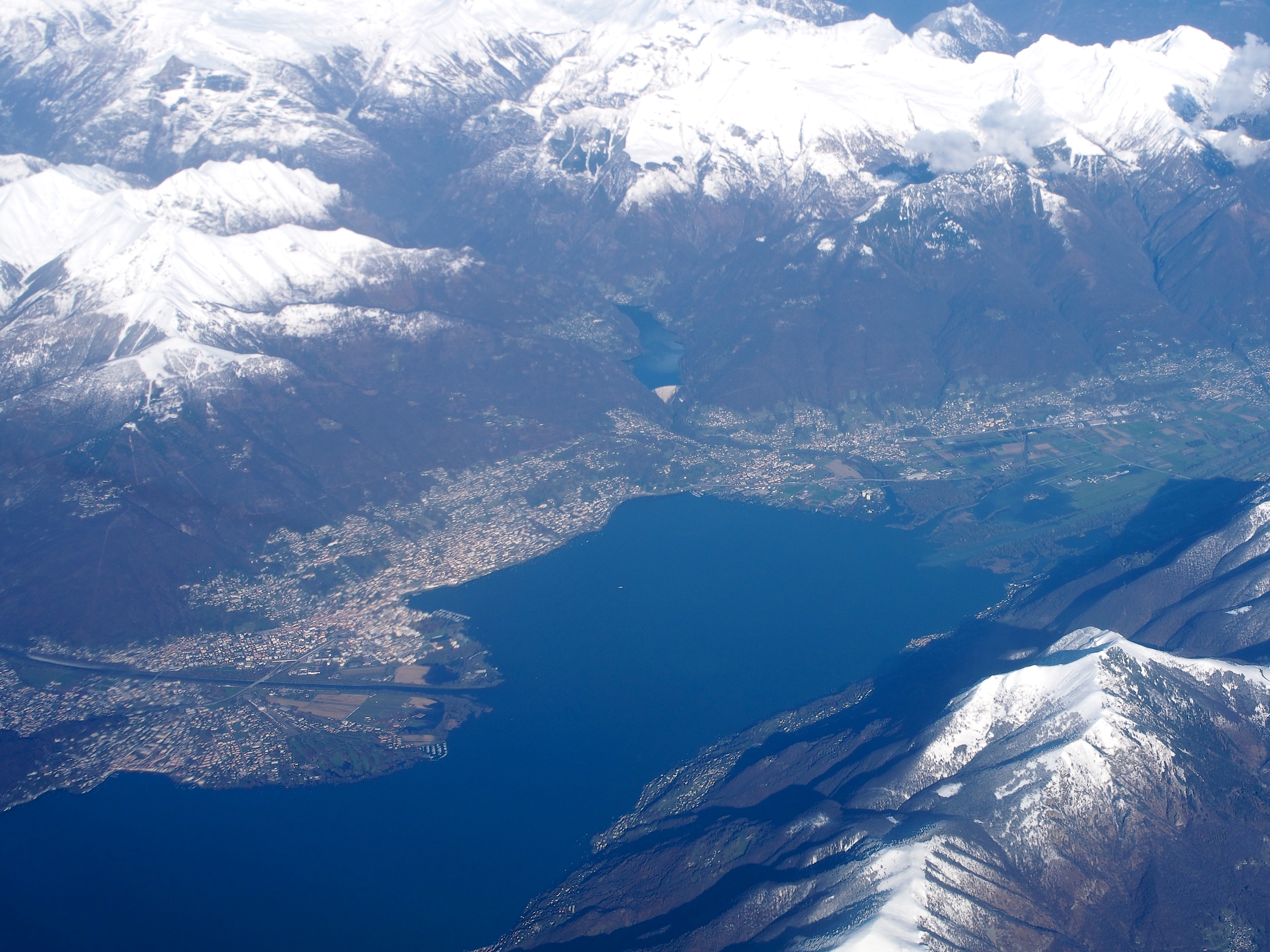
The Maggia delta with Ascona and Locarno (located on the northern part of the delta, above the river), seen from south

The Maggia is a river in the Swiss canton of Ticino, with a length of 56 kilometers. It derives its name from the village Maggia, situated on the river.

The springs are near the Cristallina mountain at 8136 ft (2480 m). The river runs through the Val Sambuco, the Val Lavizzara, and the Valle Maggia, and empties into Lago Maggiore between Ascona and Locarno.

The river is used for hydroelectric power production, e.g. with the dams of Lago del Narèt and Lago del Sambuco near the sources.

The Maggia river is a popular scuba diving spot due to its crystal clear waters.

In the 1990s the river had a European record: the river that grew fastest during rains. This characteristic led to many tragedies in the past. One involved the collapse of a bridge connecting the old Maggia to Aurigeno and Moghegno which killed many people in the 1970s.

== Geography ==
The Maggia's main tributaries include the torrents Bavona and Rovana, as well as the Melezza river. The Maggia is one of the most torrential watercourses in Europe and experiences sudden and significant variations in water flow. While the river is not channelized, numerous sections have been developed through work carried out by a consortium from 1891 to 1930.

== Flooding ==
The Maggia has experienced repeated flooding throughout its history, which was formerly exacerbated by the intensive practice of timber floating. The most catastrophic floods occurred in Cevio in 1648, killing 52 people, and in 1868, which resulted in 41 deaths.

A stone bridge constructed between Losone and Solduno in 1815-1816 was half-destroyed by flooding and subsequently restored in 1887. The 1951 flood caused the collapse of the iron bridge at Ponte Brolla, while the 1978 flood caused significant material damage throughout the region.

== Hydroelectric development ==
In 1949, the canton of Ticino and six Swiss German-speaking companies united to form the hydroelectric plants company Officine idroelettriche della Maggia SA (Ofima). The same year, the company obtained a concession for exploiting the river's hydraulic forces, with the concession set to expire in 2035 for part of the watercourse and in 2048 for the remainder.

== See also ==
- List of rivers of Switzerland
