= Lago d'Isola =

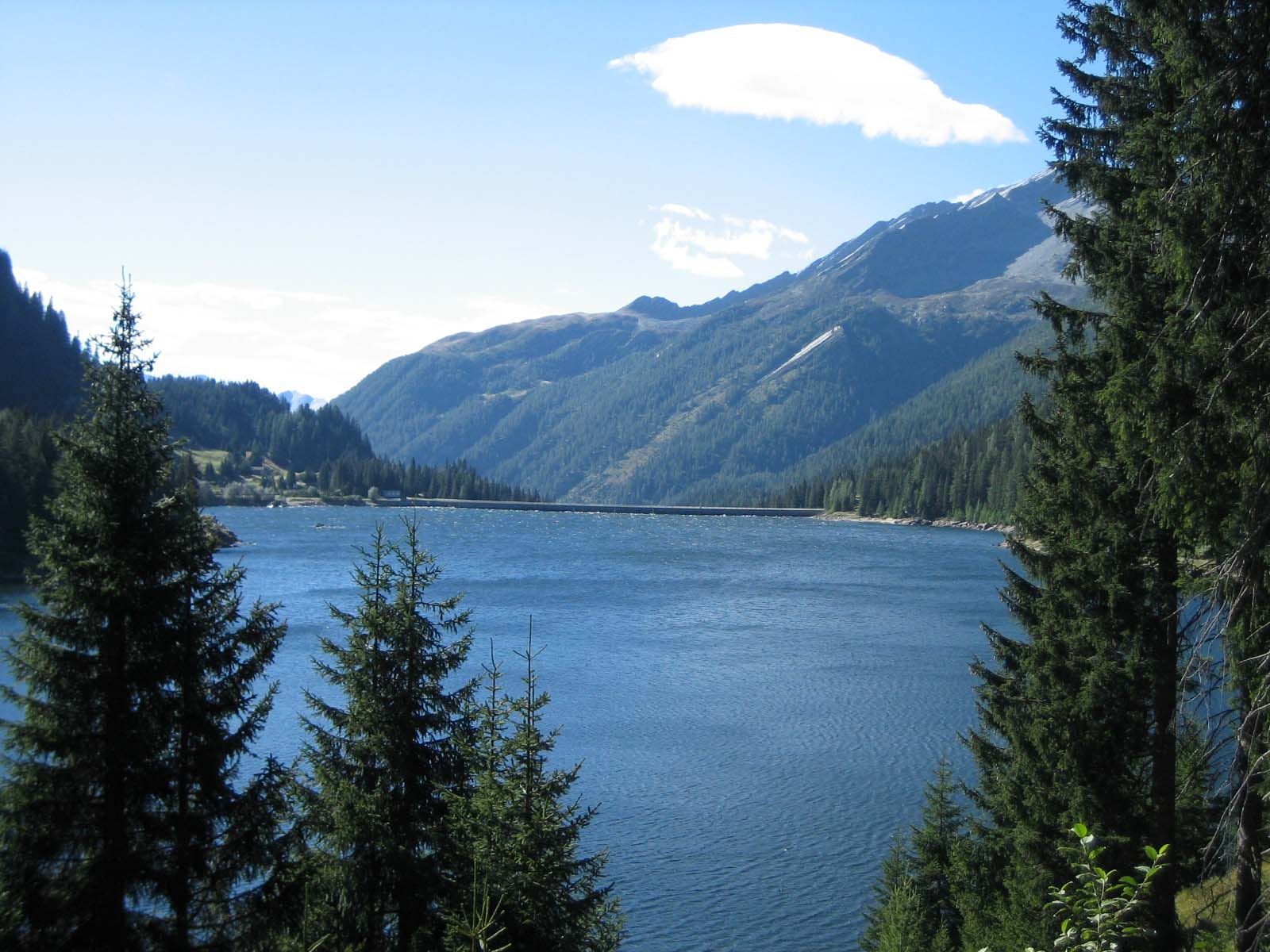

- Location within Canton of Graubünden Location within Switzerland Location within Italy Location within Alps
- Interactive map of Lago d'Isola
- Location: Grisons
- Coordinates: 46°27′3.2″N 9°11′13.8″E
- Type: reservoir
- Basin countries: Switzerland
- Surface area: 39 ha (96 acres)
- Max. depth: 39 m (128 ft)
- Surface elevation: 1,604 m (5,262 ft)

Lago d'Isola is a reservoir at San Bernardino, Grisons, Switzerland. The reservoir's surface area is 39 ha (96 acres).

== See also ==
- List of lakes of Switzerland
- List of mountain lakes of Switzerland
