= Lag da Pigniu =

- Panixersee; Panixer Stausee
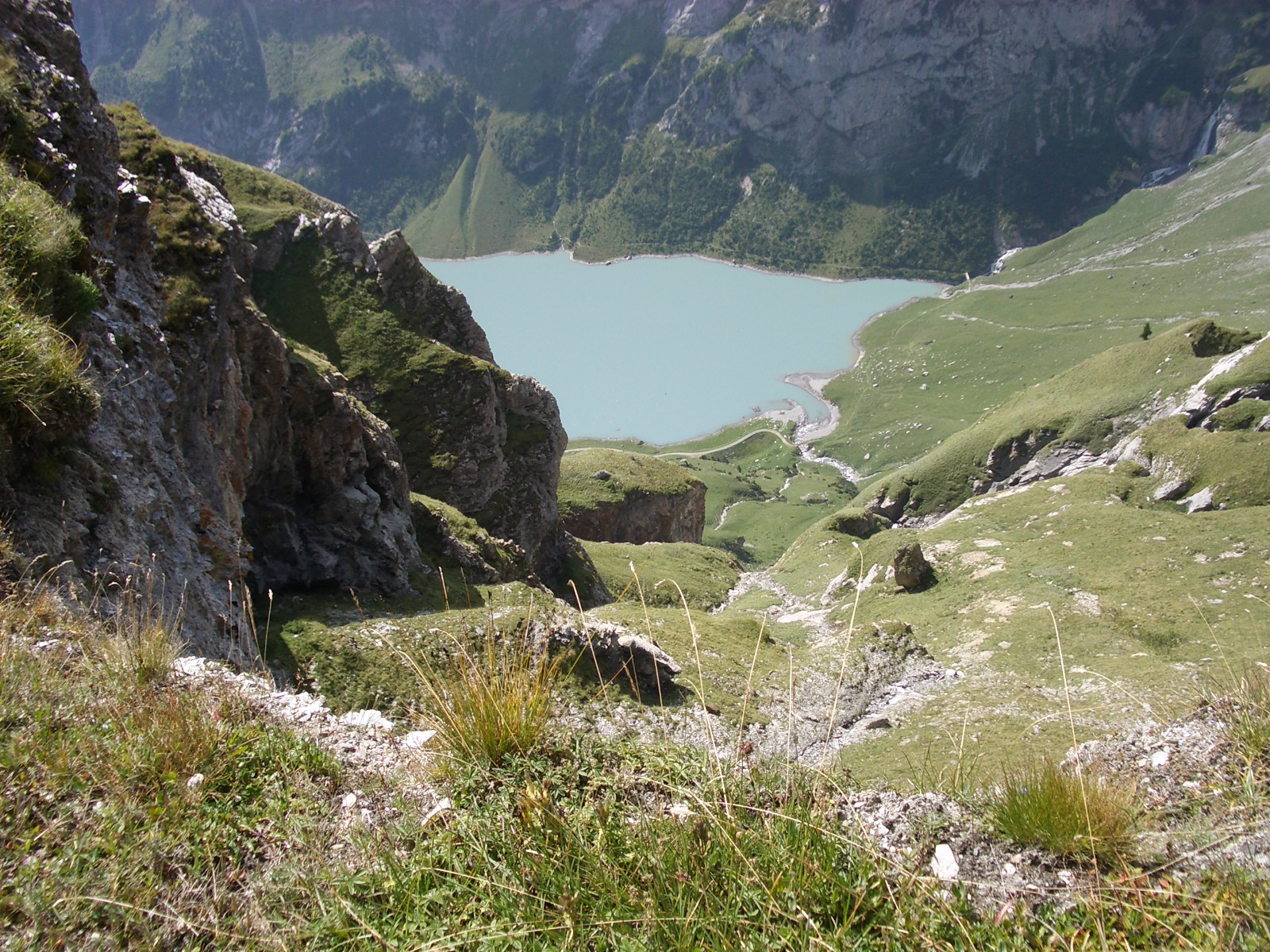
- View from the Panix Pass

- Location within Canton of Graubünden Location within Switzerland Location within Italy Location within Alps
- Interactive map of Lag da Pigniu
- Location: Grisons
- Coordinates: 46°50′N 9°06′E
- Type: reservoir
- Basin countries: Switzerland
- Surface area: 40 ha (99 acres)
- Max. depth: 42 m (138 ft)
- Surface elevation: 1,450 m (4,760 ft)

Lag da Pigniu (or Panixer Stausee) is a reservoir above Pigniu (Panix) in the Grisons, Switzerland. The 53 m gravity dam was completed in 1989. It is operated by Kraftwerke Ilanz AG.

== See also ==
- List of lakes of Switzerland
- List of mountain lakes of Switzerland
