= Lac des Toules =

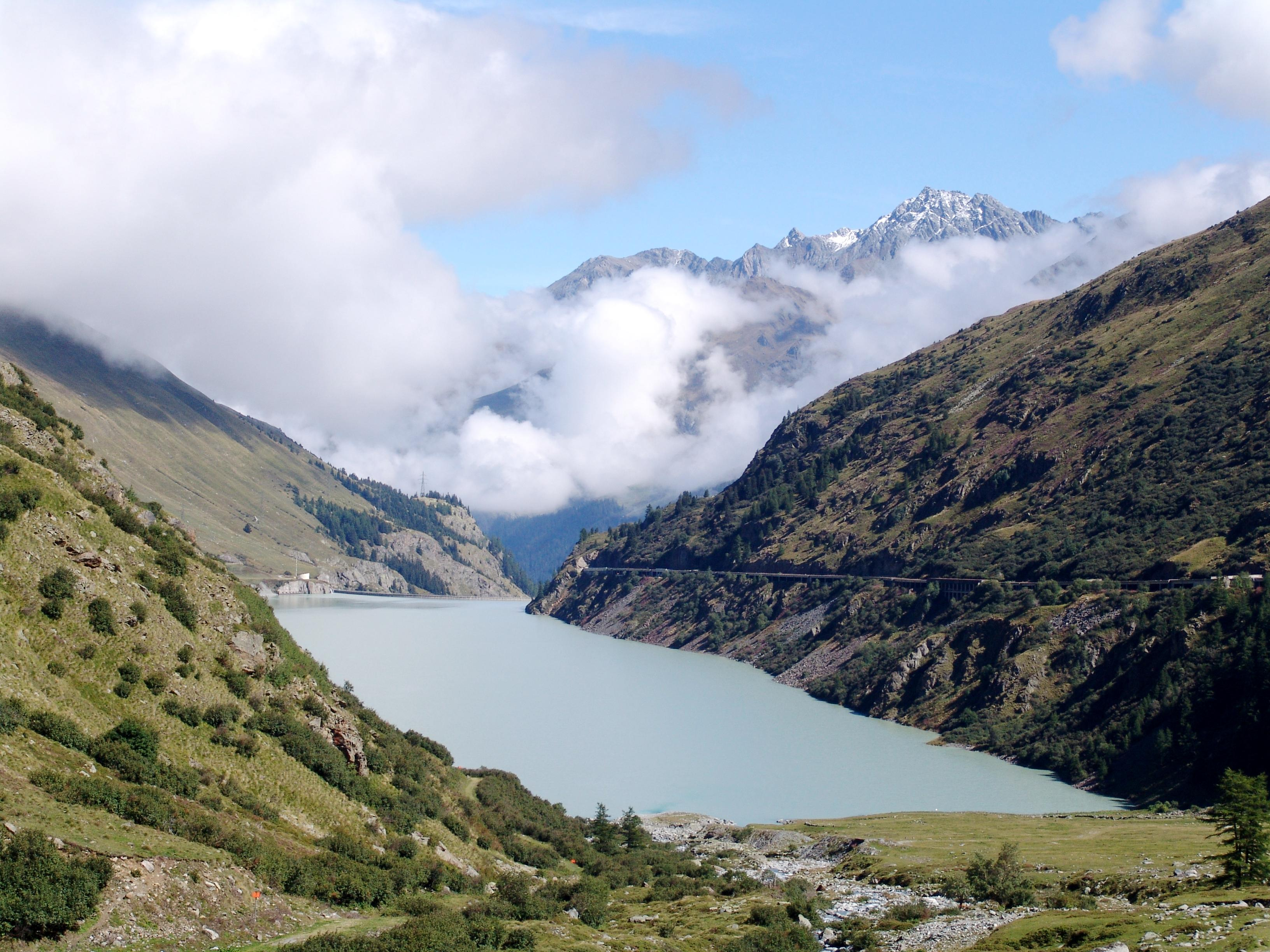

- Location within Canton of Valais Location within Aosta Valley Location within Switzerland Location within Italy Location within Alps
- Interactive map of Lac des Toules
- Location: Valais
- Coordinates: 45°55′9″N 7°11′56″E
- Type: reservoir
- Primary inflows: La Dranse
- Primary outflows: La Dranse d'Entremont
- Catchment area: 37.6 km^{2} (14.5 sq mi)
- Basin countries: Switzerland
- Max. length: 2.0 km (1.2 mi)
- Surface area: 0.61 km^{2} (0.24 sq mi)
- Max. depth: 75 m (246 ft)
- Water volume: 20.15 million cubic metres (16,340 acre⋅ft)
- Surface elevation: 1,810 m (5,940 ft)

Lac des Toules is a reservoir in Valais, Switzerland, at Bourg-Saint-Pierre. Its surface area is 0.61 km^{2} (0.24 sq mi). It has a €2.2 million floating solar plant that was flown in by helicopter in 2019, and delivers 800 MWh/year.

The dam Les Toules was completed in 1963.

== See also ==
- List of lakes of Switzerland
- List of mountain lakes of Switzerland
