= Arnensee =

- Lac d'Arnon
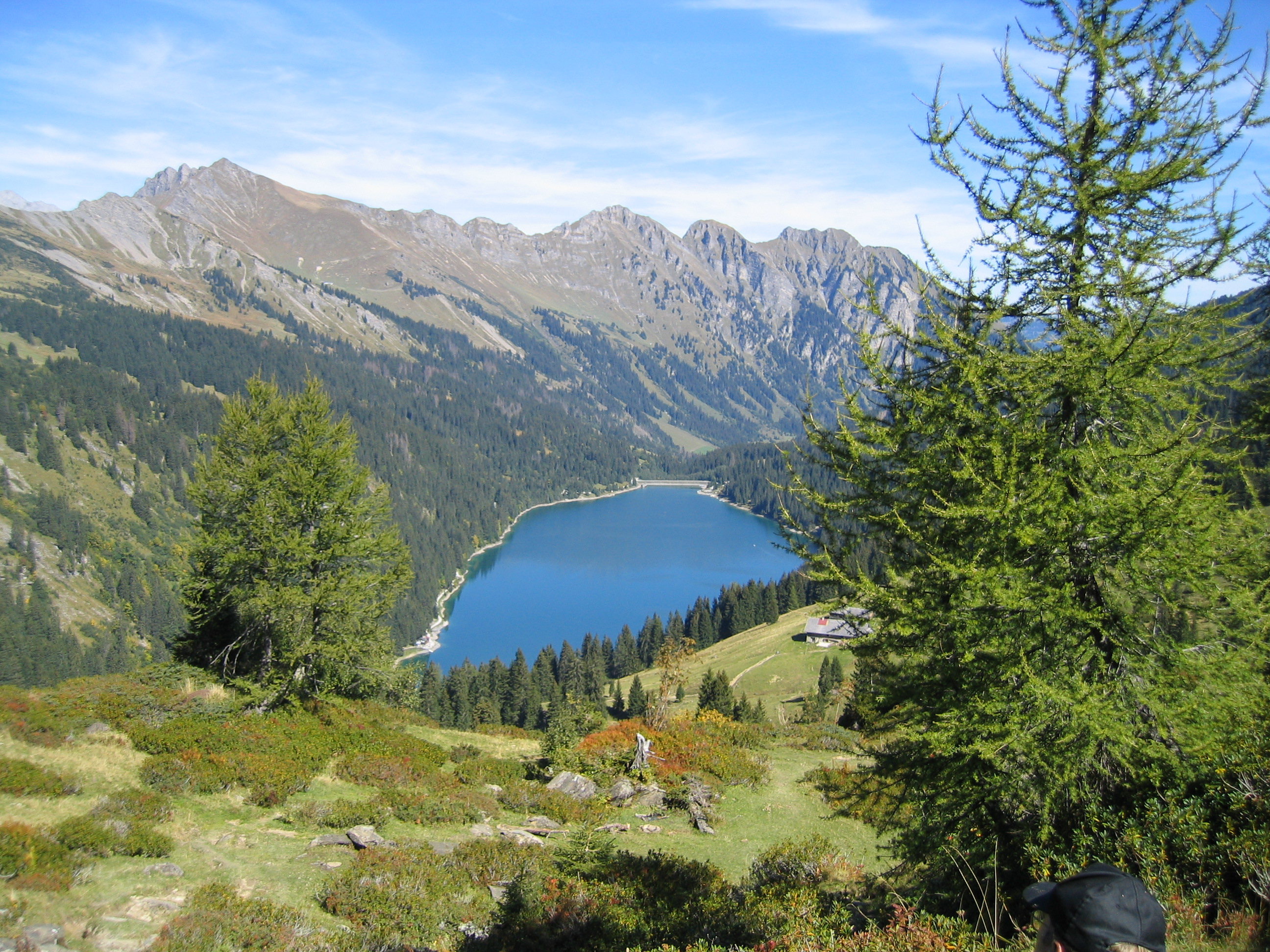

- Location within Canton of Bern Location within Switzerland Location within Alps
- Interactive map of Arnensee
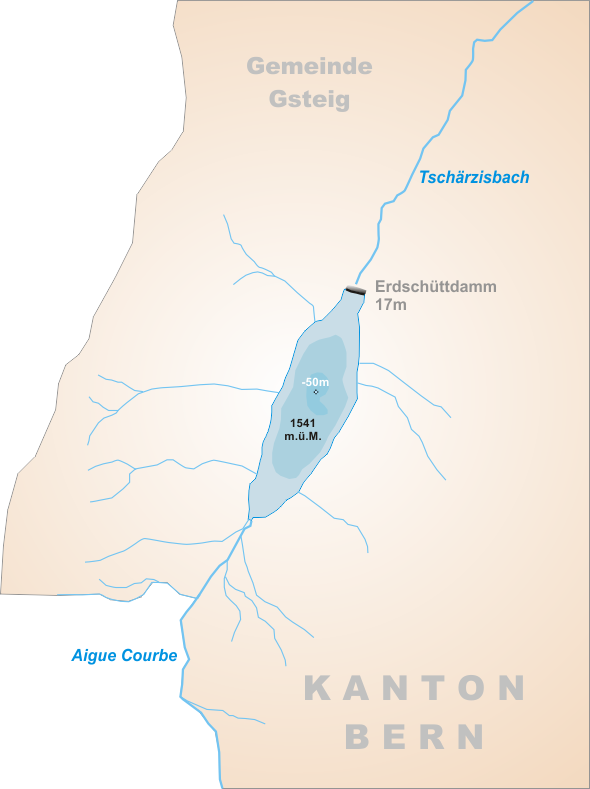
- map
- Location: Gsteig, Canton of Bern
- Coordinates: 46°23′17.54″N 7°13′0.4″E
- Type: reservoir
- Primary inflows: Tschärzisbach
- Primary outflows: Tschärzisbach
- Catchment area: 7.1 km^{2} (2.7 sq mi)
- Basin countries: Switzerland
- Max. length: 1.5 km (0.93 mi)
- Surface area: 0.456 km^{2} (0.176 sq mi)
- Max. depth: 50 m (160 ft)
- Water volume: 10.5 million cubic metres (8,500 acre⋅ft)
- Surface elevation: 1,542 m (5,059 ft)

Arnensee (French: Lac d'Arnon) is a lake in canton of Bern, Switzerland. The lake in the municipality of Gsteig is used as a reservoir by Romande Energie. The dam was built in 1942. Its volume is 10.5 million m^{3} and surface area 0.456 km^{2}.

== See also ==
- List of lakes of Switzerland
- List of mountain lakes of Switzerland
