= Lac de Salanfe =

Reservoir in Valais, Switzerland

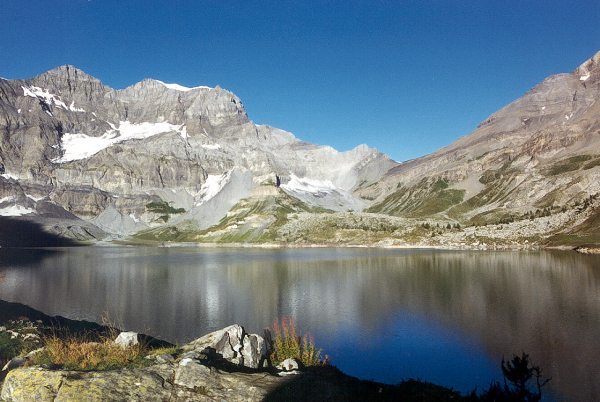

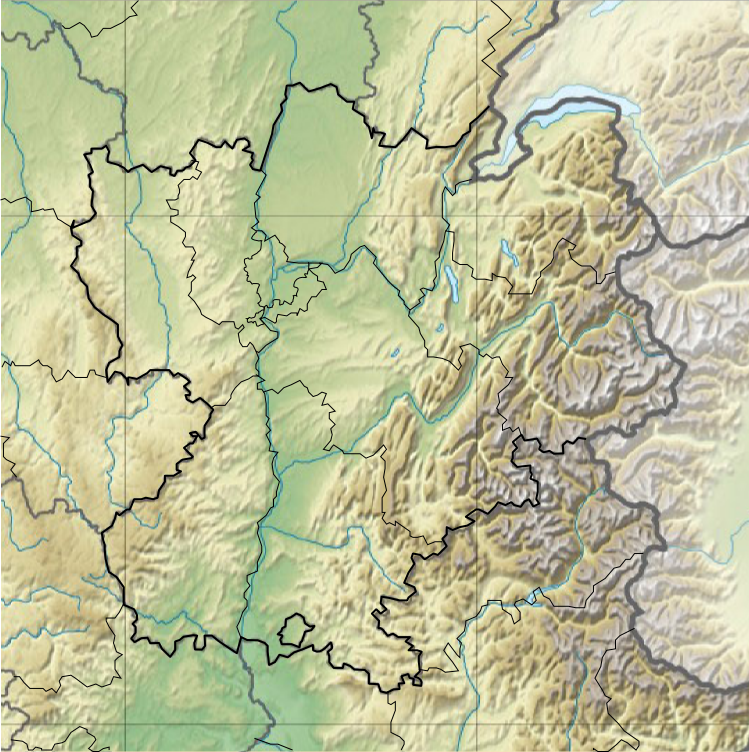
- Location within Canton of Valais Location within Rhône-Alpes Location within Switzerland Location within France Location within Alps
- Interactive map of Lac de Salanfe
- Location: Valais
- Coordinates: 46°8′21″N 6°57′17″E
- Catchment area: 18.4 km^{2} (7.1 sq mi)
- Basin countries: Switzerland
- Max. length: 2 km (1.2 mi)
- Surface area: 1.62 km^{2} (0.63 sq mi)
- Max. depth: 48 m (157 ft)
- Surface elevation: 1,925 m (6,316 ft)

Lac de Salanfe is a lake in the municipality of Evionnaz, Valais, Switzerland. The reservoir is located at an elevation of 1925 m. Its surface area is 1.62 km^{2} (0.63 sq mi).

It can be reached by 6.5 km-long footpath from Vernayaz.

The dam Salanfe was completed in 1952.

Different major walking trails cross in Salanfe. The two biggest are 'Le tour des Dents du Midi' and the Via Alpina. Many hikers stay the night at the refuge situated next to the lake.

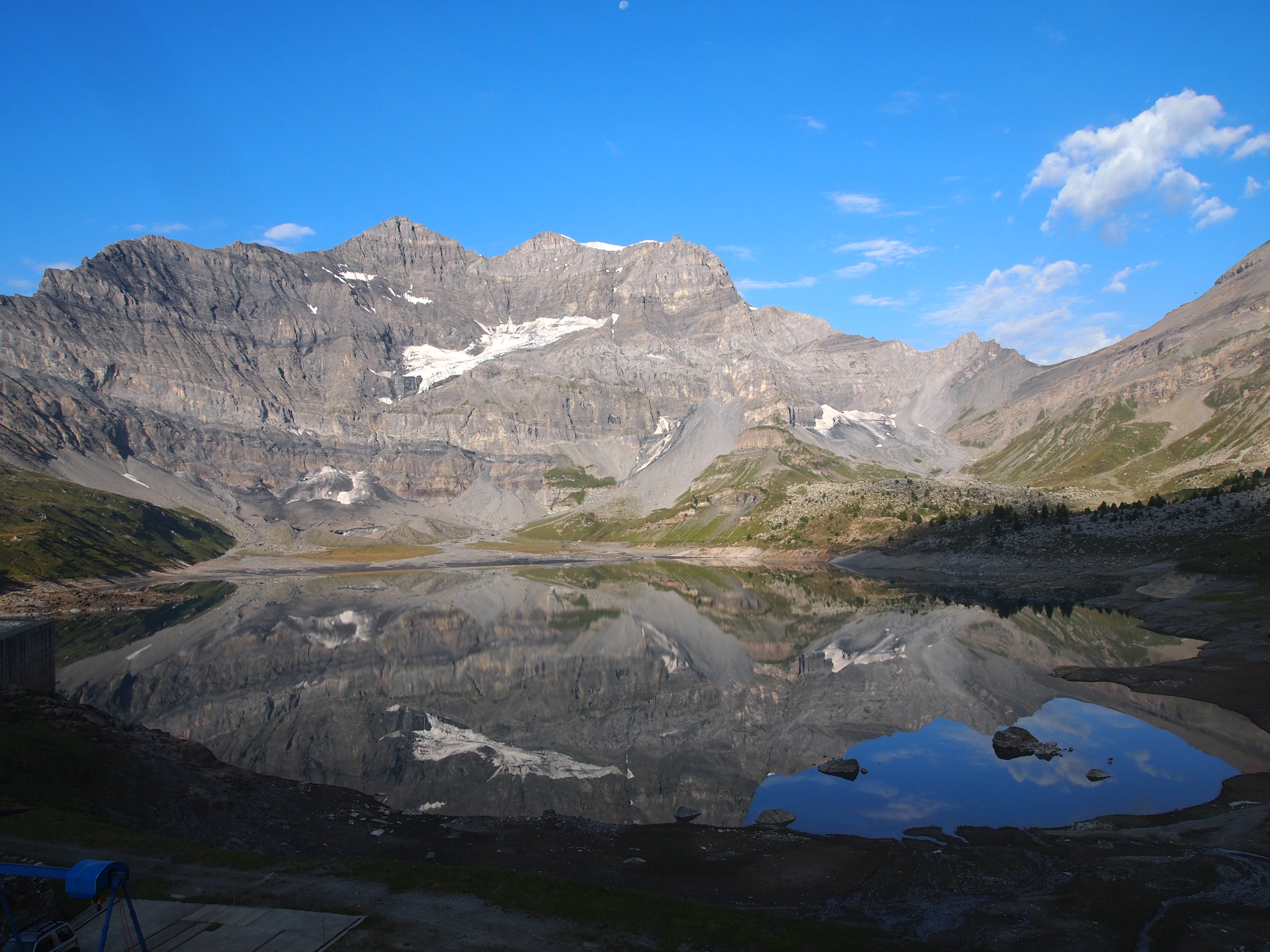
Lac de Salanfe, summer, 2011

Lac de Salanfe, video

== See also ==
- List of lakes of Switzerland
- List of mountain lakes of Switzerland
