= Lago di Lucendro =

Reservoir in Ticino, Switzerland

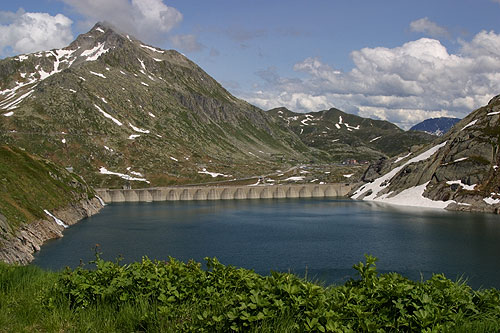

- Location within Canton of Ticino Location within Canton of Uri Location within Switzerland Location within Alps
- Interactive map of Lago di Lucendro
- Location: Ticino
- Coordinates: 46°33′43″N 8°32′31″E
- Catchment area: 7.05 km^{2} (2.72 sq mi)
- Basin countries: Switzerland
- Surface area: 0.54 km^{2} (0.21 sq mi)
- Max. depth: 96 m (315 ft)
- Water volume: 25×10^{6} m^{3} (880×10^{6} cu ft)
- Surface elevation: 2,134.50 m (7,003.0 ft)

Lago di Lucendro is a reservoir at the St. Gotthard Pass in the municipality of Airolo of the canton of Ticino, Switzerland. The dam Lucendro was built between 1944 and 1947.

== See also ==
- List of lakes of Switzerland
- List of mountain lakes of Switzerland
