= Sufnersee =

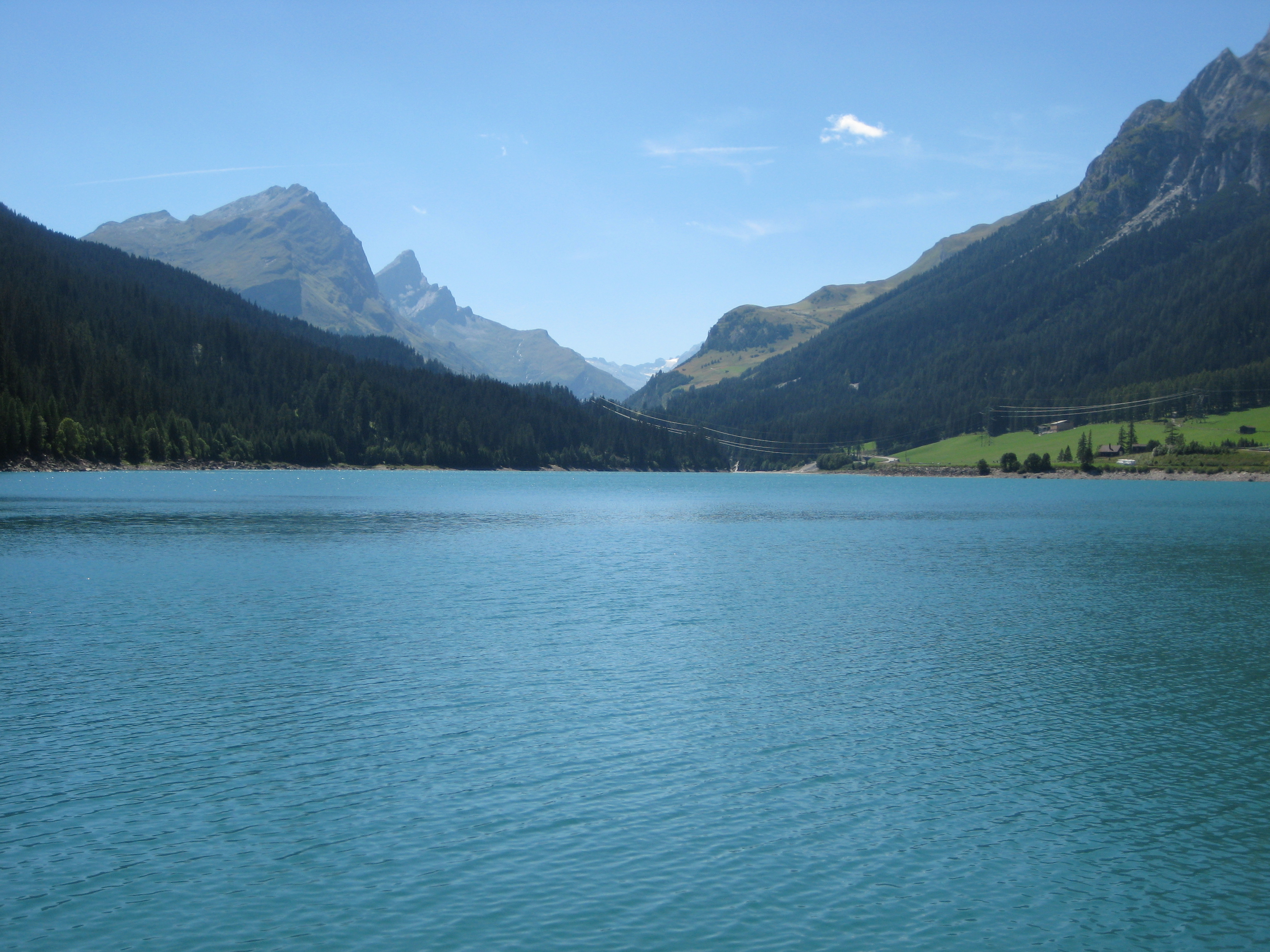

- Location within Canton of Graubünden Location within Switzerland Location within Italy Location within Alps
- Interactive map of Sufnersee
- Location: Grisons
- Coordinates: 46°34′2″N 9°22′16″E
- Type: reservoir
- Primary inflows: Hinterrhein
- Primary outflows: Hinterrhein
- Catchment area: 194 km^{2} (75 sq mi)
- Basin countries: Switzerland
- Max. length: 2.2 km (1.4 mi)
- Surface area: 0.90 km^{2} (0.35 sq mi)
- Max. depth: 51 m (167 ft)
- Water volume: 17.5 million cubic metres (14,200 acre⋅ft)
- Surface elevation: 1,401 m (4,596 ft)

Sufnersee is a reservoir between Splügen and Sufers on the Hinterrhein river in the Grisons, Switzerland, surrounded by peaks of the Adula Alps. The Sufers dam was built in 1962. The reservoir has a volume of 17.5 million m³ and its surface area is 0.90 km².

== See also ==
- List of lakes of Switzerland
- List of mountain lakes of Switzerland
