= Lac de Moron =

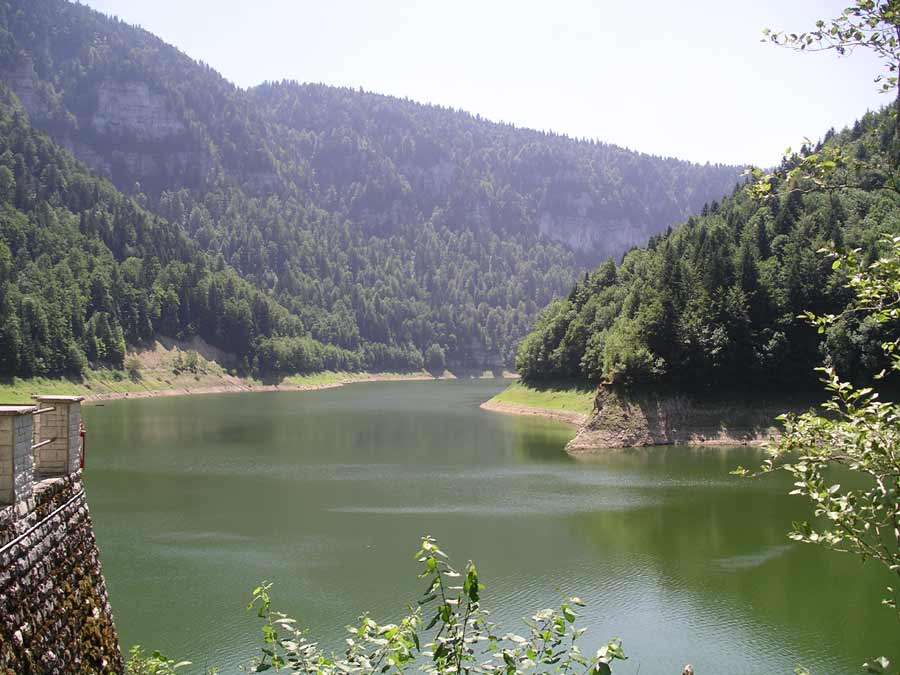

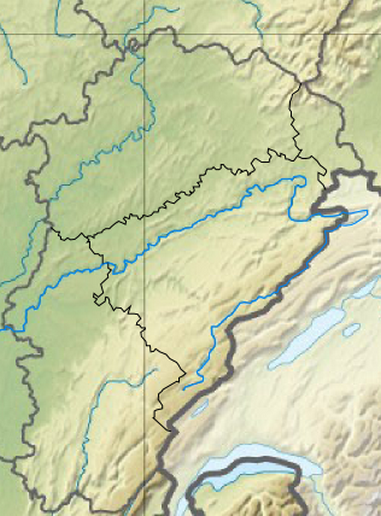
- Location within Canton of Neuchâtel Location within Franche-Comté Location within Switzerland Location within France Location within Alps
- Interactive map of Lac de Moron
- Location: Canton of Neuchâtel (CH), Doubs department (F)
- Coordinates: 47°5′29″N 6°44′27″E
- Type: reservoir
- Primary inflows: Doubs
- Primary outflows: Doubs
- Catchment area: 911 km^{2} (352 sq mi)
- Basin countries: Switzerland, France
- Max. length: 3.3 km (2.1 mi)
- Surface area: 0.69 km^{2} (0.27 sq mi)
- Max. depth: 59 m (194 ft)
- Water volume: 20.6 million cubic metres (16,700 acre⋅ft)
- Surface elevation: 716 m (2,349 ft)

Lac de Moron is a reservoir formed by damming the river Doubs on the border of France and Switzerland. It can be reached from Les Planchettes or Les Brenets in the Canton of Neuchâtel (Switzerland) and from Le Barboux in the Doubs department (France).

The reservoir has a volume of 20.6 million m³ and its surface area is 0.69 km^{2} (0.27 sq mi). The arch dam Châtelot was completed in 1953.

== See also ==
- List of lakes of Switzerland
