= List of lakes of Switzerland =

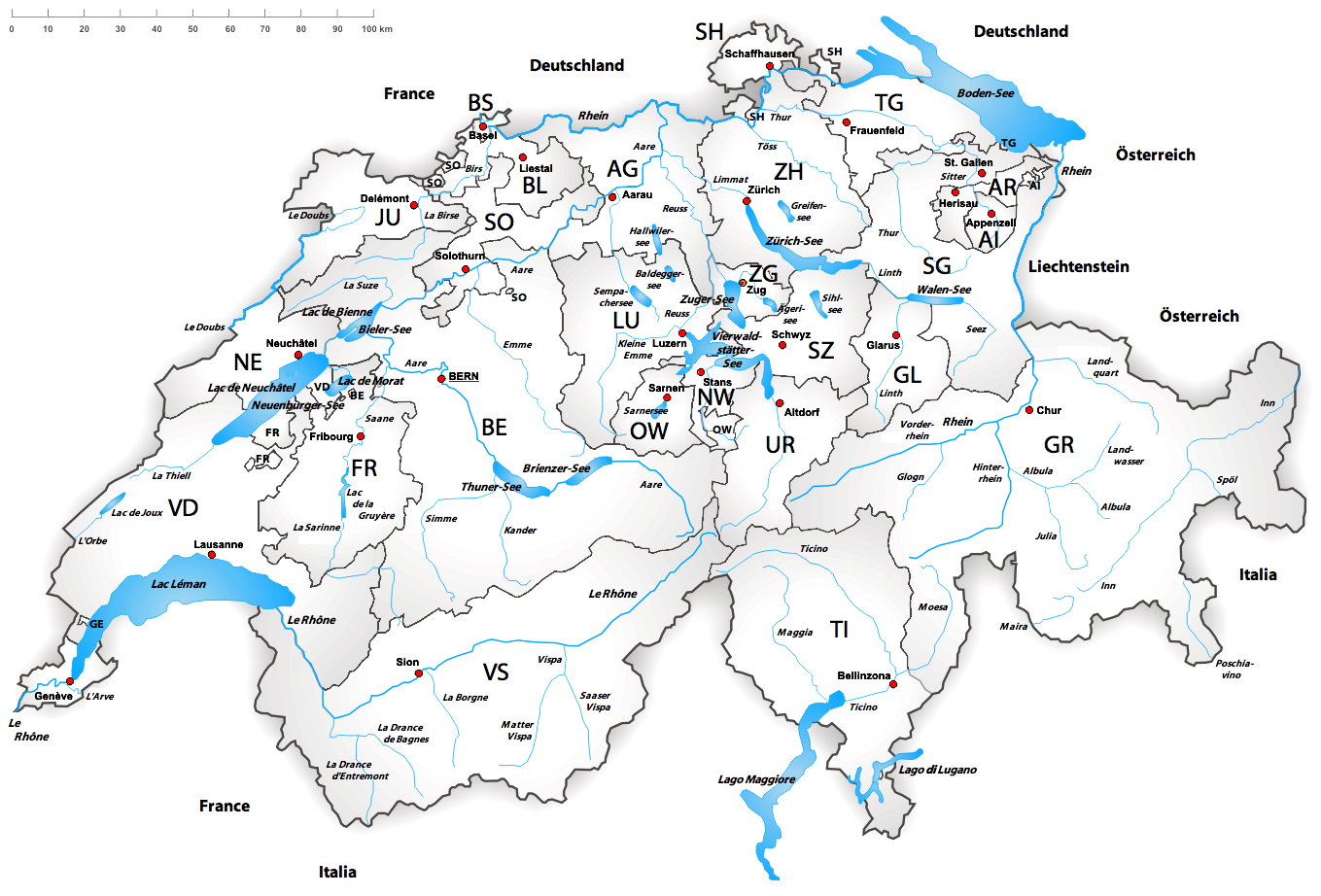
Map of major lakes and rivers of Switzerland labelled in the relevant local language (French, German or Italian).

This article contains a sortable table listing all major lakes of Switzerland. The table includes all still water bodies located either entirely or partly in Switzerland, both natural and artificial, that have a surface area of at least 30 hectares (74 acres), regardless of water volume, maximum depth or other metric. These lakes are ranked by area, the table including also the elevation above sea level and maximum depth. They are either natural (type N), natural but used as reservoirs (NR) or fully artificial (A).

Along with the mountains, lakes constitute a major natural feature of Switzerland, with over 1,000 km (620 mi) of shores within the country. (Note: Approximately (see coastline paradox) 1,000 km (620 mi) counting only the 17 lakes over 10 square kilometres (3.9 sq mi) (length retrieved from the Google Earth geographical information program).) Lakes, large and small, can be found in almost all cantons and provide an important source of water, leisure opportunities, as well as suitable habitat for fish-eating birds. The two most extensive, Lake Geneva and Lake Constance, are amongst the largest in Europe and mark the border of the Swiss Plateau, along with the Alps and the Jura Mountains. The largest wholly Swiss lake is Lake Neuchâtel. The remaining lakes over 100 km^{2} (39 sq mi) are Lake Maggiore and Lake Lucerne. In total 103 lakes exist that are more than 30 ha (74 acres) in surface area, and a considerable number of smaller lakes. All these lakes are found in the four major river basins of Switzerland: Rhine, Rhone, Po and Danube, (Note: The remaining basin (the Adige) being marginal and comporting only small lakes (of which the largest is Lai da Rims).) at almost all elevations below the permanent snow line.

Many lakes are navigable and include recreational boat lines, such as Lake Constance (URh), Lake Geneva (CGN), Lake Lucerne (SGV), Lake Lugano (SNL), Lake Walen (Schiffsbetrieb Walensee) and Lake Zurich (ZSG).

== Distribution ==
There are several thousand lakes in Switzerland, with estimations up to 7000, although those include very small water bodies, traditionally referred to as "lakes". (Note: For example, the Blausee ("blue lake"), the Märjelensee ("Märjelen lake"), and the Schwarzsee ("black lake") are smaller than one hectare in surface area.) On this list, only the 103 largest lakes, which are over 30 hectares in area, are included. Among these, 58 are over 1.0 km^{2}, 17 are over 10 km^{2}, and just five are over 100 km^{2} in area. Of these lakes, 37 are natural, 21 are natural, but are used as reservoirs, and 45 are manmade reservoirs. These 103 lakes are shared among 21 cantons, out of the 26. (Note: The cantons of Appenzell Ausserrhoden, Appenzell Innerrhoden, Basel-Stadt, Basel-Landschaft, and Solothun do not appear in this list.) Some of these lakes are also shared with neighboring France, Germany, Austria, and Italy (for simplicity purposes, only the total area of the lake is indicated). Four of the cantons (Grisons, Bern, Valais, and Ticino) have more than 10 of the lakes, apiece, and just over one-half of the cantons (14) have one or more lakes of over 100 km^{2} in area. Most of these lakes are either below 800 metres above sea level (mostly natural lakes), or above 1600 metres (mostly manmade lakes). A large majority of the lakes, 66, are located in the Rhine basin (partly via the Aare River); 17 in the Rhone basin (partly via the Doubs River); 14 in the Po River basin (mostly via the Ticino River); and six are in the Danube River basin (all via the Inn River).

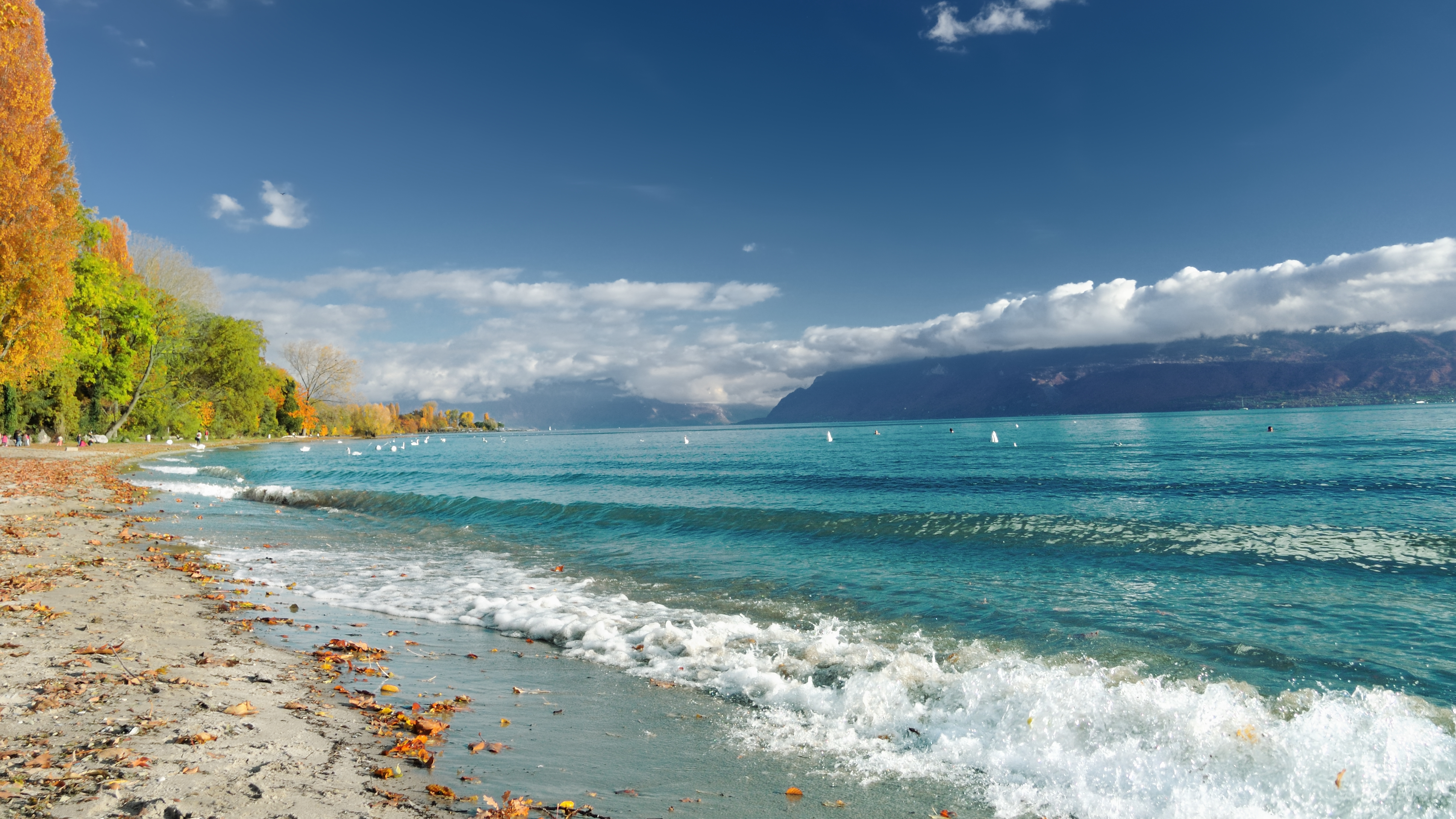
Largest in area and volume: Lake Geneva

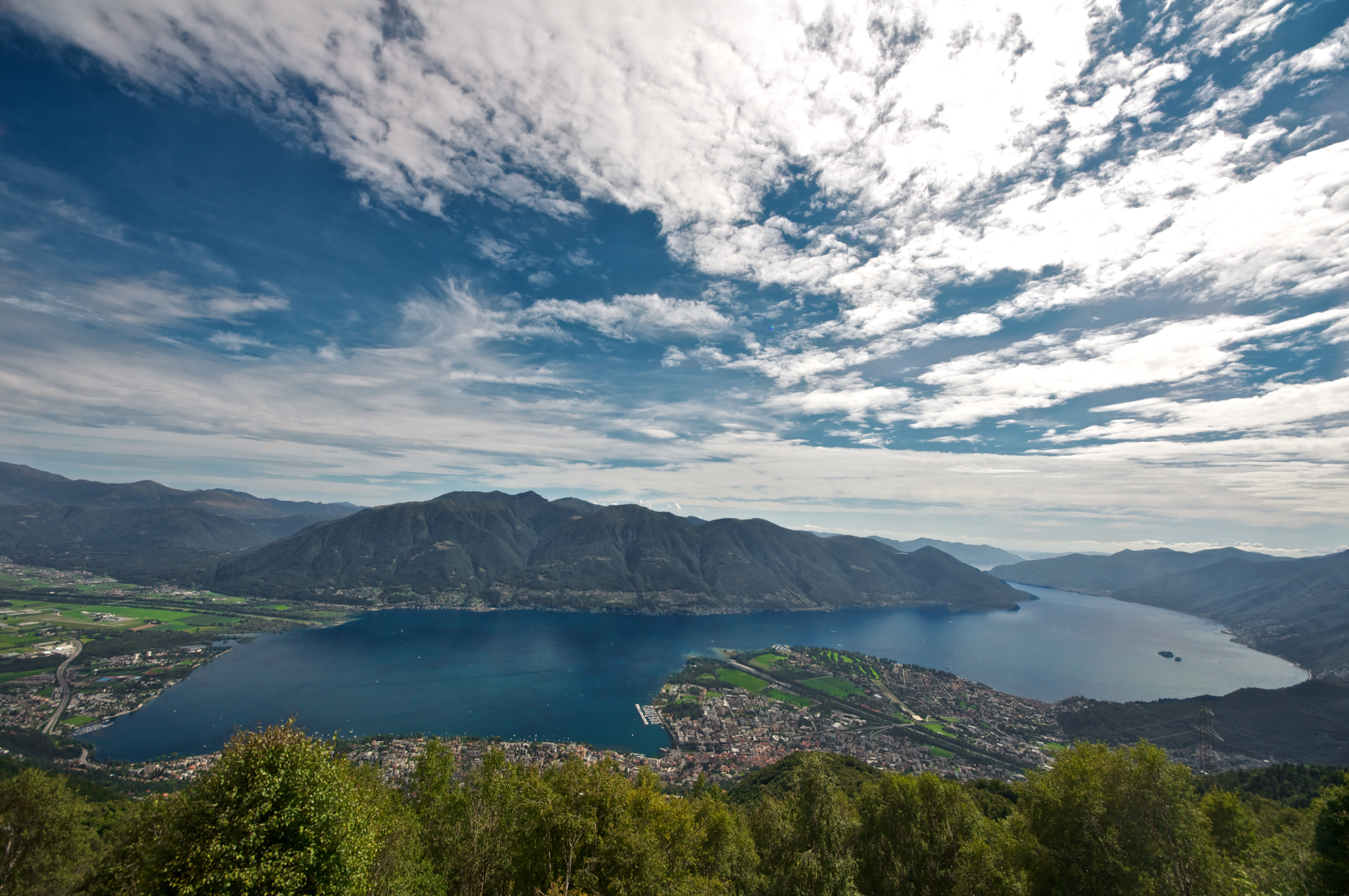
Lowest and deepest: Lake Maggiore

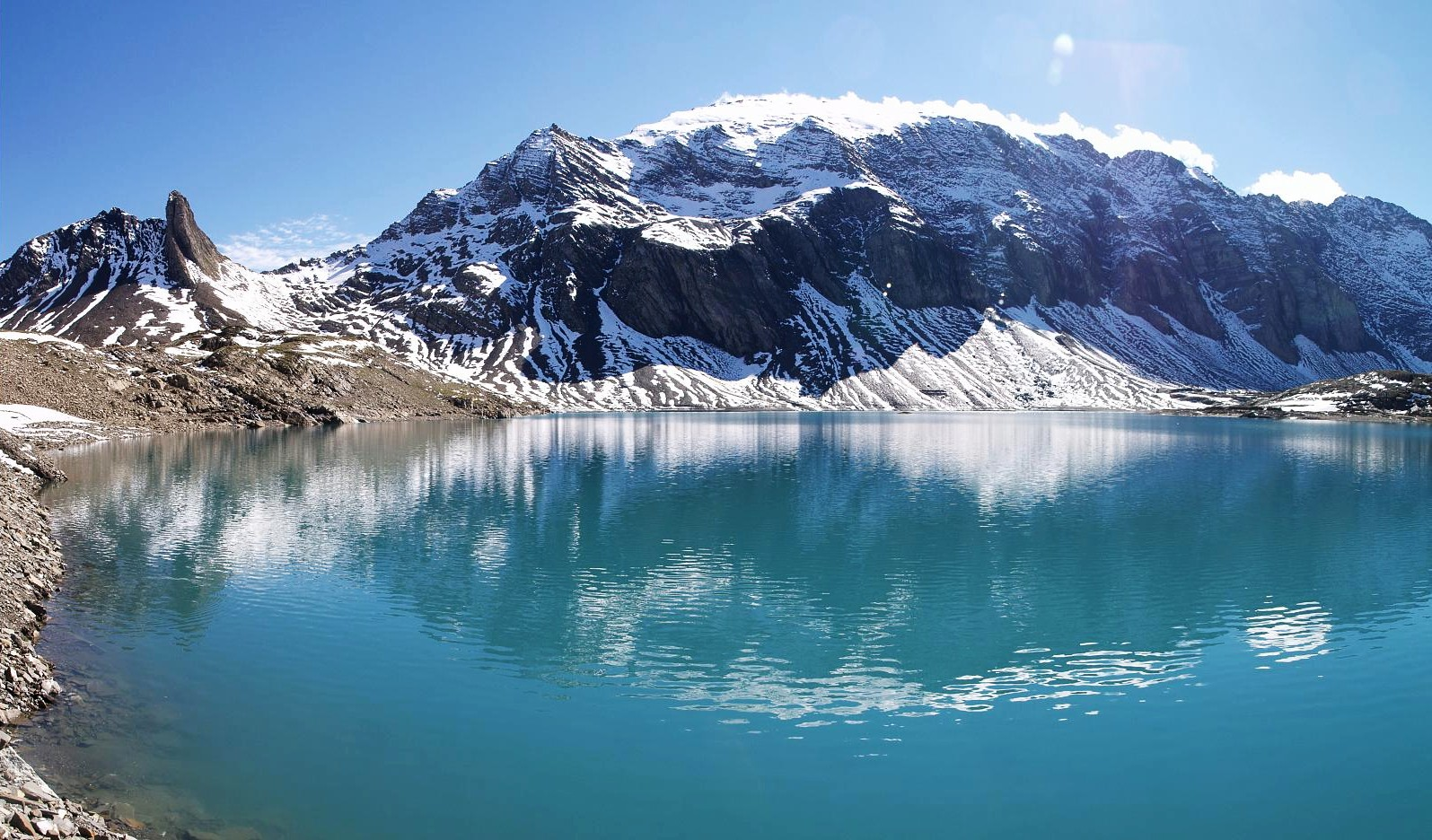
Highest: Muttsee

Distribution by canton of the lakes over 0.30 km^{2}, grouped by area, elevation and depth
Canton	By area				By elevation (Note: See List of mountain lakes of Switzerland for a more detailed distribution.)			By max. depth				Total	Lakes per 100 km^{2} 39 sq mi
Canton	<1 km^{2} 0.4 sq mi	1–9.99 km^{2} 0.4–3.9 sq mi	10–99 km^{2} 4–38 sq mi	>100 km^{2} 39 sq mi	<800 m 2,625 ft	800–1,599 m 2,625–5,246 ft	>1,600 m 5,249 ft	<50 m 160 ft	50–99 m 164–325 ft	100–199 m 328–653 ft	>200 m 660 ft	Total	Lakes per 100 km^{2} 39 sq mi
Aargau	1	1	1	0	3	0	0	3	0	0	0	3	0.21
Bern	8	4	3	1	9	2	5	7	5	2	2	16	0.27
Fribourg	2	2	1	1	4	2	0	3	2	1	0	6	0.36
Geneva	0	1	0	1	2	0	0	1	0	0	1	2	0.71
Glarus	1	2	1	0	1	1	2	1	1	2	0	4	0.58
Grisons	9	10	0	0	0	4	15	4	9	6	0	19	0.27
Jura	1	0	0	0	1	0	0	1	0	0	0	1	0.12
Lucerne	2	1	3	1	7	0	0	3	2	1	1	7	0.47
Neuchâtel	4	0	1	1	5	1	0	3	2	1	0	6	0.75
Nidwalden	0	0	0	1	1	0	0	0	0	0	1	1	0.36
Obwalden	2	2	0	1	3	0	2	2	2	0	1	5	1.02
Schaffhausen	0	0	1	0	1	0	0	1	0	0	0	1	0.34
Schwyz	0	2	3	1	4	2	0	2	1	2	1	6	0.66
St. Gallen	1	0	2	1	3	1	0	0	0	3	1	4	0.20
Thurgau	1	0	1	1	3	0	0	2	0	0	1	3	0.30
Ticino	5	5	1	1	3	1	8	1	4	4	3	12	0.43
Uri	0	1	0	1	1	0	1	0	0	1	1	2	0.19
Valais	6	6	0	1	1	0	12	3	4	4	2	13	0.25
Vaud	2	2	1	2	4	3	0	4	0	2	1	7	0.22
Zug	0	1	1	0	2	0	0	0	1	1	0	2	0.84
Zurich	1	2	1	0	4	0	0	3	0	1	0	4	0.23
Switzerland	45	41	12	5	42	17	44	40	31	23	9	103	0.25

== Main list ==
Rank	Name	Type*	Local names	Canton(s), neighboring countries	River basin	Area		Elevation		Max. depth	
Rank	Name	Type*	Local names	Canton(s), neighboring countries	River basin	km^{2}	mi^{2}	m	ft	m	ft
1	Lake Geneva	N	Lac Léman, Lac de Genève	Geneva, Vaud, Valais, France	Rhone	580.03	223.95	372.0	1,220.5	310	1,020
2	Lake Constance (Obersee)	N	Bodensee	St. Gallen, Thurgau, Austria, Germany	Rhine	473.00	182.63	396	1,299	252	827
3	Lake Neuchâtel	N	Lac de Neuchâtel, Neuenburgersee	Bern, Fribourg, Neuchâtel, Vaud	Rhine	215.20	83.09	429.4	1,409	153	502
4	Lake Maggiore	N	Verbano, Lago Maggiore	Ticino, Italy	Po	210.12	81.13	193.5	635	372	1,220
5	Lake Lucerne	N	Vierwaldstättersee	Lucerne, Nidwalden, Obwalden, Schwyz, Uri	Rhine	113.72	43.91	433.6	1,423	214	702
6	Lake Zurich	N	Zürichsee	St. Gallen, Schwyz, Zurich	Rhine	88.17	34.04	405.9	1,332	136	446
7	Untersee	N	Untersee	Schaffhausen, Thurgau, Germany	Rhine	63.00	24.32	396	1,299	37	121
8	Lake Lugano	N	Ceresio, Lago di Lugano	Ticino, Italy	Po	48.67	18.79	270.5	887	288	945
9	Lake Thun	N	Thunersee	Bern	Rhine	47.74	18.43	557.8	1,830	215	705
10	Lake Bienne	N	Lac de Bienne, Bielersee	Bern, Neuchâtel	Rhine	39.51	15.25	429.1	1,408	74	243
11	Lake Zug	N	Zugersee	Lucerne, Schwyz, Zug	Rhine	38.41	14.83	413.6	1,357	198	650
12	Lake Brienz	N	Brienzersee	Bern	Rhine	29.81	11.51	563.7	1,849	260	850
13	Lake Walen	N	Walensee	Glarus, St. Gallen	Rhine	24.16	9.33	419.0	1,374.7	150	490
14	Lake Morat	N	Lac de Morat (Murtensee)	Fribourg, Vaud	Rhine	22.80	8.80	429.2	1,408	46	151
15	Lake Sempach	N	Sempachersee	Lucerne	Rhine	14.36	5.54	503.8	1,653	87	285
16	Sihlsee	A	Sihlsee	Schwyz	Rhine	10.72	4.14	889	2,917	23	75
17	Lake Hallwil	N	Hallwilersee	Aargau, Lucerne	Rhine	10.21	3.94	448.7	1,472	47	154
18	Lake Gruyère	A	Lac de la Gruyère	Fribourg	Rhine	9.60	3.71	677	2,221	75	246
19	Lac de Joux	NR	Lac de Joux	Vaud	Rhine	8.77	3.39	1,004	3,294	34	112
20	Greifensee	N	Greifensee	Zurich	Rhine	8.17	26.8	435.1	1,427	34	112
21	Lake Sarnen	N	Sarnersee	Obwalden	Rhine	7.38	2.85	468.4	1,537	52	171
22	Ägerisee	N	Ägerisee	Zug	Rhine	7.25	2.80	723.9	2,375	82	269
23	Lake Baldegg	N	Baldeggersee	Lucerne	Rhine	5.24	2.02	463.0	1,519.0	66	217
24	Lago di Livigno	A	Lago di Livigno	Grisons, Italy	Danube	4.71	1.82	1,805	5,922	119	390
25	Schiffenensee	A	Schiffenensee, Lac de Schiffenen	Fribourg	Rhine	4.25	1.64	532	1,745	38	125
26	Wägitalersee	A	Wägitalersee	Schwyz	Rhine	4.18	1.61	900	3,000	65	213
27	Lago di Lei	A	Lago di Lei	Grisons, Italy	Rhine	4.12	1.59	1,931	6,335	133	436
28	Lake Sils	N	Silsersee, Lej da Segl	Grisons	Danube	4.10	1.58	1,797	5,896	71	233
29	Lac des Dix	A	Lac des Dix	Valais	Rhone	3.65	1.41	2,365	7,759	227	745
30	Lake Wohlen	A	Wohlensee	Bern	Rhine	3.65	1.41	480	1,570	20	66
31	Lac d'Emosson	A	Lac d'Emosson	Valais	Rhone	3.27	10.7	1,930	6,330	161	528
32	Klöntalersee	NR	Klöntalersee	Glarus	Rhine	3.18	1.23	847	2,779	47	154
33	Lake Silvaplana	N	Silvaplanersee, Lej da Silvaplauna	Grisons	Danube	3.18	1.23	1,790	5,870	77	253
34	Pfäffikersee	N	Pfäffikersee	Zurich	Rhine	3.06	1.18	536	1,759	35	115
35	Lake Lauerz	N	Lauerzersee	Schwyz	Rhine	3.00	1.16	447	1,467	14	46
36	Grimselsee	NR	Grimselsee	Bern	Rhine	2.63	1.02	1,908	6,260	100	330
37	Lake Lungern	NR	Lungerersee, Lungernsee	Obwalden	Rhine	2.01	0.78	688	2,257	68	223
38	Lac de Mauvoisin	A	Lac de Mauvoisin	Valais	Rhone	2.08	0.80	1,961	6,434	180	590
39	Lago di Poschiavo	NR	Lago di Poschiavo	Grisons	Po	1.98	0.76	962	3,156	85	279
40	Lai da Sontga Maria	A	Lai da Sontga Maria	Grisons, Ticino	Rhine	1.77	5.8	1,908	6,260	86	282
41	Mattmarksee	A	Mattmarksee	Valais	Rhone	1.76	0.68	2,197	7,208	93	305
42	Lago di Vogorno	A	Lago di Vogorno	Ticino	Po	1.68	0.65	470	1,540	204	669
43	Lac de Salanfe	A	Lac de Salanfe	Valais	Rhone	1.62	0.63	1,925	6,316	48	157
44	Zervreilasee	A	Zervreilasee	Grisons	Rhine	1.61	0.62	1,862	6,109	140	460
45	Lac de l'Hongrin	A	Lac de l'Hongrin	Vaud	Rhine	1.60	0.62	1,255	4,117	105	344
46	Lago Bianco	NR	Lago Bianco	Grisons	Po	1.50	0.58	2,234	7,329	53	174
47	Lago Ritom	NR	Lago Ritom	Ticino	Po	1.49	0.58	1,850	6,070	69	226
48	Oberaarsee	A	Oberaarsee	Bern	Rhine	1.47	4.8	2,303	7,556	90	300
49	Lai da Marmorera	A	Lai da Marmorera	Grisons	Rhine	1.41	0.54	1,680	5,510	65	213
50	Lac de Moiry	A	Lac de Moiry	Valais	Rhone	1.40	0.54	2,249	7,379	120	390
51	Limmernsee	A	Limmernsee	Glarus	Rhine	1.36	0.53	1,857	6,093	122	400
52	Göscheneralpsee	A	Göscheneralpsee	Uri	Rhine	1.32	0.51	1,792	5,879	106	348
53	Lago di Luzzone	A	Lago di Luzzone	Ticino	Po	1.27	4.2	1,606	5,269	181	594
54	Albigna lake	A	Lago da l'Albigna; Lägh da l'Albigna	Grisons	Po	1.26	0.49	2,163	7,096	108	354
55	Oeschinen Lake	N	Oeschinensee	Bern	Rhine	1.15	0.44	1,578	5,177	56	184
56	Klingnauer Stausee	A	Klingnauer Stausee	Aargau	Rhine	1.11	0.43	318	1,043	8.5	28
57	Lago del Sambuco	A	Lago del Sambuco	Ticino	Po	1.11	0.43	1,461	4,793	124	407
58	Lac de Verbois	A	Lac de Verbois	Geneva	Rhone	1.01	0.39	369	1,211		
59	Lai da Nalps	A	Lai da Nalps	Grisons	Rhine	0.90	0.35	1,908	6,260	122	400
60	Lac de Tseuzier	A	Lac de Tseuzier	Valais	Rhone	0.83	0.32	1,777	5,830	140	460
61	Sufnersee	A	Sufnersee	Grisons	Rhine	0.82	0.32	1,401	4,596	51	167
62	Lai da Curnera	A	Lai da Curnera	Grisons	Rhine	0.79	0.31	1,956	6,417	136	446
63	Lake St. Moritz	N	Lej da San Murezzan, St. Moritzersee	Grisons	Danube	0.75	0.29	1,768	5,801	42	138
64	Lago del Narèt	NR	Lago del Narèt	Ticino	Po	0.73	0.28	2,310	7,580	104	341
65	Flachsee	A	Flachsee	Aargau	Rhine	0.71	0.27	380	1,250	7	23
66	Lac des Brenets	N	Lac des Brenets	Neuchâtel, France	Rhone	0.70	0.27	750	2,460	26	85
67	Alte Aare	N	Alte Aare	Bern	Rhine	0.70	0.27	428	1,404		
68	Gigerwaldsee	A	Gigerwaldsee	St. Gallen	Rhine	0.69	0.27	1,335	4,380	135	443
69	Lac de Moron	A	Lac de Moron	Neuchâtel, France	Rhone	0.69	0.27	716	2,349	59	194
70	Lac de Montsalvens	A	Lac de Montsalvens	Fribourg	Rhine	0.66	0.25	801	2,628	50	160
71	Räterichsbodensee	A	Räterichsbodensee	Bern	Rhine	0.66	0.25	1,767	5,797	77	253
72	Lac Brenet	NR	Lac Brenet	Vaud	Rhine	0.65	0.25	1,002	3,287	18	59
73	Daubensee	N	Daubensee	Valais	Rhone	0.64	0.25	2,205	7,234		
74	Griessee	A	Griessee	Valais	Rhone	0.64	0.25	2,386	7,828	66	217
75	Gelmersee	NR	Gelmersee	Bern	Rhine	0.62	0.24	1,850	6,070	42	138
76	Lac des Toules	A	Lac des Toules	Valais	Rhone	0.60	0.23	1,810	5,940	75	246
77	Lake Davos	NR	Davosersee	Grisons	Rhine	0.57	1.9	1,560	5,120	52	171
78	Lac du Vieux Emosson	A	Lac du Vieux Emosson	Valais	Rhone	0.55	0.21	2,205	7,234	42	138
79	Lago di Lucendro	NR	Lago di Lucendro	Ticino	Rhine	0.54	0.21	2,135	7,005	96	315
80	Mauensee	N	Mauensee	Lucerne	Rhine	0.54	0.21	503	1,650	9	30
81	Melchsee	NR	Melchsee	Obwalden	Rhine	0.51	0.20	1,891	6,204	18	59
82	Niederriedsee	A	Niederriedsee	Bern	Rhine	0.49	0.19	461	1,512	8	26
83	Türlersee	N	Türlersee	Zurich	Rhine	0.49	0.19	643	2,110	22	72
84	Lac de Cleuson	A	Lac de Cleuson	Valais	Rhone	0.48	0.19	2,186	7,172	76	249
85	Lac de Bret	NR	Lac de Bret	Vaud	Rhone	0.48	0.19	674	2,211	20	66
86	Lago dei Cavagnöö	A	Lago dei Cavagnöö, Lago di Cavagnoli	Ticino	Po	0.48	0.19	2,310	7,580	100	330
87	Rotsee	N	Rotsee	Lucerne	Rhine	0.47	1.5	419	1,375	16	52
88	Engstlensee	NR	Engstlensee	Bern	Rhine	0.46	0.18	1,851	6,073	49	161
89	Lac des Taillères	NR	Lac des Taillères	Neuchâtel	Rhine	0.46	0.18	1,040	3,410	7	23
90	Schwarzsee	N	Schwarzsee	Fribourg	Rhine	0.45	0.17	1,046	3,432	10	33
91	Lago della Sella	NR	Lago della Sella	Ticino	Po	0.45	0.17	2,256	7,402	30	98
92	Arnensee	NR	Arnensee	Bern	Rhine	0.45	0.17	1,542	5,059	50	160
93	Lej da Vadret	N	Laj da Vadret	Grisons	Danube	0.43	0.17	2,160	7,090		
94	Muttsee	NR	Muttsee	Glarus	Rhine	0.41	0.16	2,446	8,025	68	223
95	Lac de Biaufond	A	Lac de Biaufond	Jura, Neuchâtel, France	Rhone	0.40	0.15	606	1,988	10	33
96	Lago Tremorgio	NR	Lago Tremorgio	Ticino	Po	0.40	0.15	1,851	6,073	57	187
97	Lag da Pigniu	A	Lag da Pigniu, Panixersee	Grisons	Rhine	0.39	0.15	1,450	4,760	42	138
98	Amsoldingersee	N	Amsoldingersee	Bern	Rhine	0.38	0.15	641	2,103	14	46
99	Lago d'Isola	A	Lago d'Isola	Grisons	Po	0.36	0.14	1,604	5,262	39	128
100	Lai da Ova Spin	A	Lai da Ova Spin	Grisons	Danube	0.35	0.14	1,630	5,350	64	210
101	Hüttwilersee	N	Hüttwilersee	Thurgau	Rhine	0.35	0.14	434	1,424	15	49
102	Tannensee	NR	Tannensee	Obwalden	Rhine	0.34	0.13	1,976	6,483	21	69
103	Moossee	N	Moossee	Bern	Rhine	0.30	0.12	521	1,709	21	69

* Types: N = natural; NR = natural but used as reservoirs; A = fully artificial

== See also ==
- Hydrology of Switzerland
- List of rivers of Switzerland
- List of glaciers of Switzerland
- List of islands of Switzerland
- Fishing industry in Switzerland
- Category:Lakes of Switzerland by canton
- Italian Lakes – group of lakes on the Italian border
