= Griessee =

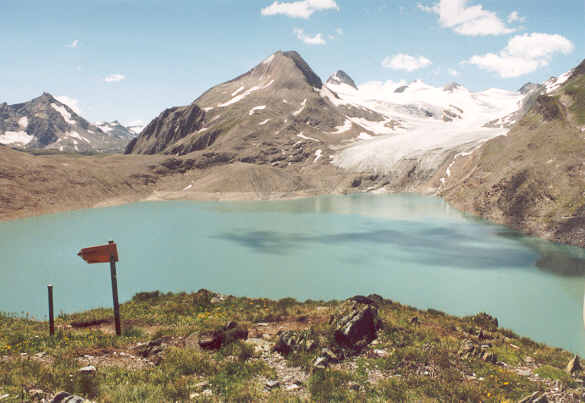

- Location within Canton of Valais Location within Piedmont Location within Switzerland Location within Italy Location within Alps
- Interactive map of Griessee
- Location: Ulrichen, Valais
- Coordinates: 46°27′27″N 8°22′12″E
- Type: reservoir
- Primary outflows: Aegina
- Catchment area: 10.6 km^{2} (4.1 sq mi)
- Basin countries: Switzerland
- Max. length: 0.9 km (0.56 mi)
- Surface area: 0.555 km^{2} (0.214 sq mi)
- Max. depth: 66 m (217 ft)
- Water volume: 18.6 million cubic metres (15,100 acre⋅ft)
- Surface elevation: 2,386 m (7,828 ft)

Griessee is a lake in Valais, Switzerland. The reservoir is located in the municipality of Ulrichen and can be reached by road from Nufenen Pass. The lake is fed by the Gries Glacier. Its surface area is 55.5 ha (137 acres).

The gravity dam Gries was built in 1965.

== See also ==
- List of lakes of Switzerland
- List of mountain lakes of Switzerland
