= Lago del Sambuco =

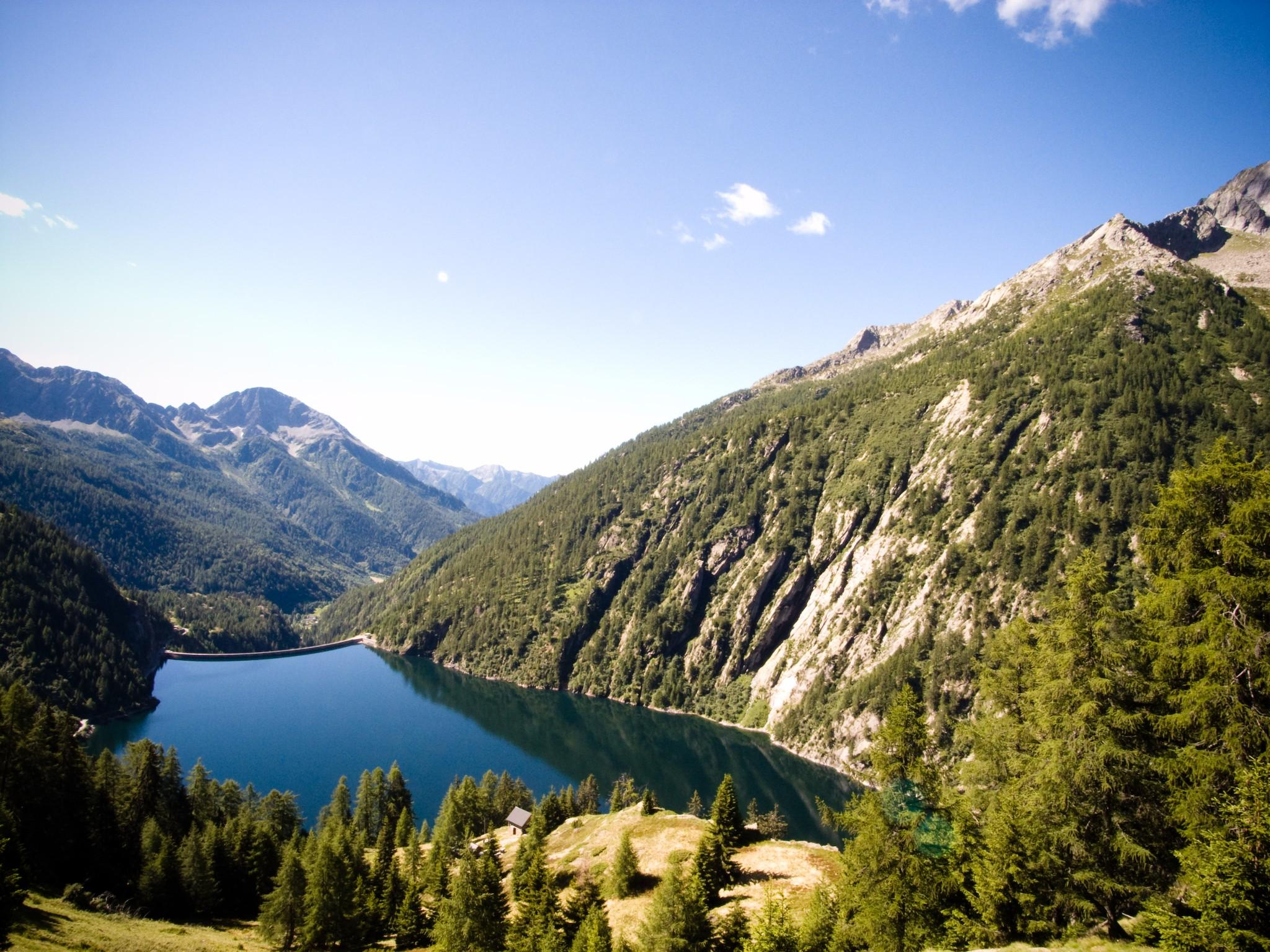

- Location within Canton of Ticino Location within Switzerland Location within Alps
- Interactive map of Lago del Sambuco
- Location: Ticino
- Coordinates: 46°27′48″N 8°39′2″E
- Type: reservoir
- Primary inflows: Maggia
- Primary outflows: Maggia
- Catchment area: 29.75 km^{2} (11.49 sq mi)
- Basin countries: Switzerland
- Max. length: 3 km (1.9 mi)
- Surface area: 111 ha (270 acres)
- Max. depth: 124 m (407 ft)
- Water volume: 775,000 m^{3} (628 acre⋅ft)
- Surface elevation: 1,461 m (4,793 ft)

Lago del Sambuco is a reservoir above Fusio,

in the municipality of Lavizzara, Ticino, Switzerland. Its surface area is 1.11 km². The dam of Sambuco on the Maggia River was completed in 1956. Its maximum height is 130 m and length 363 m.

== See also ==
- List of lakes of Switzerland
- List of mountain lakes of Switzerland
