= Lai da Nalps =

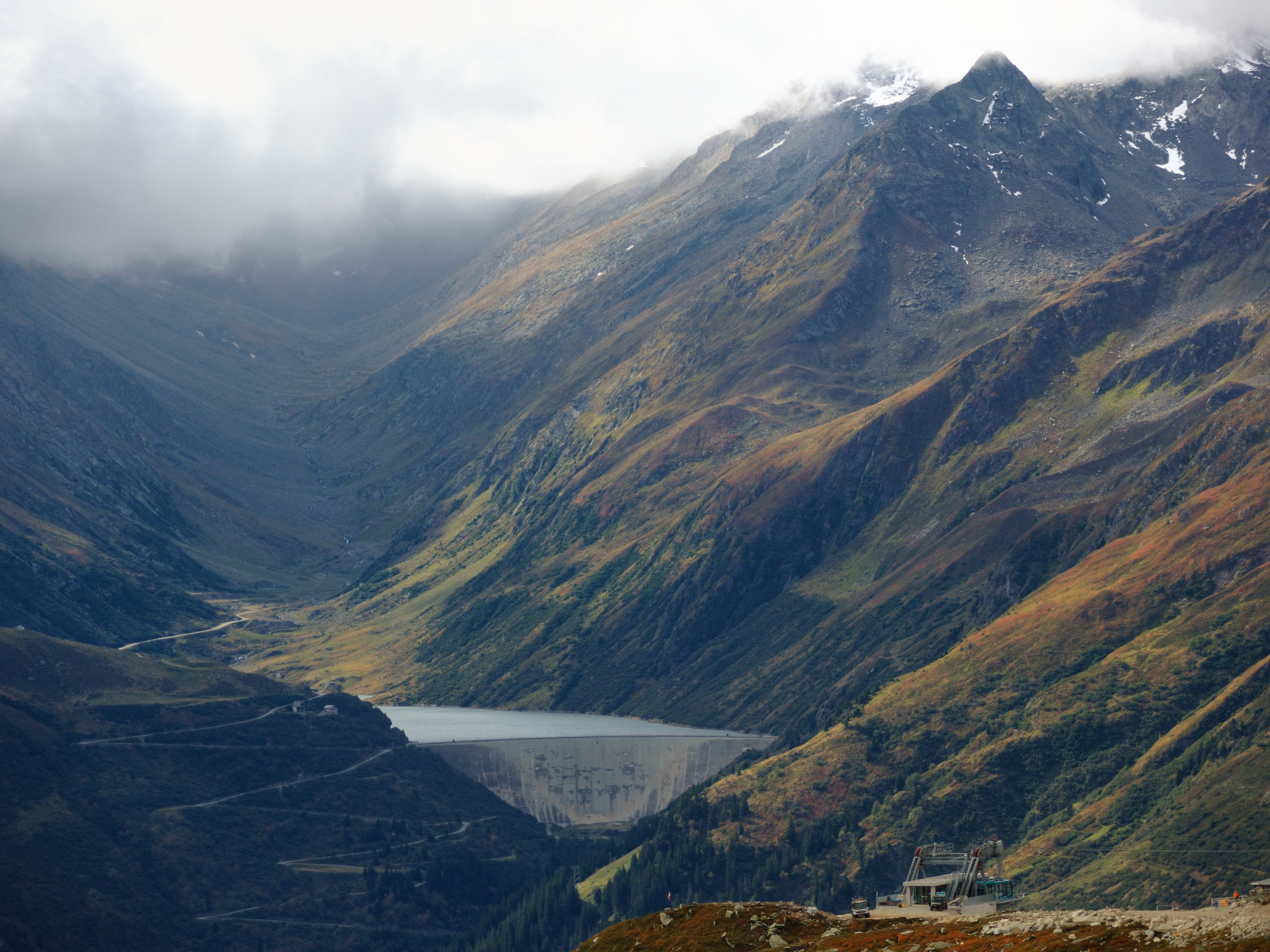
- Val Nalps from Cuolm da Vi

- Location within Canton of Graubünden Location within Switzerland Location within Italy Location within Alps
- Interactive map of Lai da Nalps
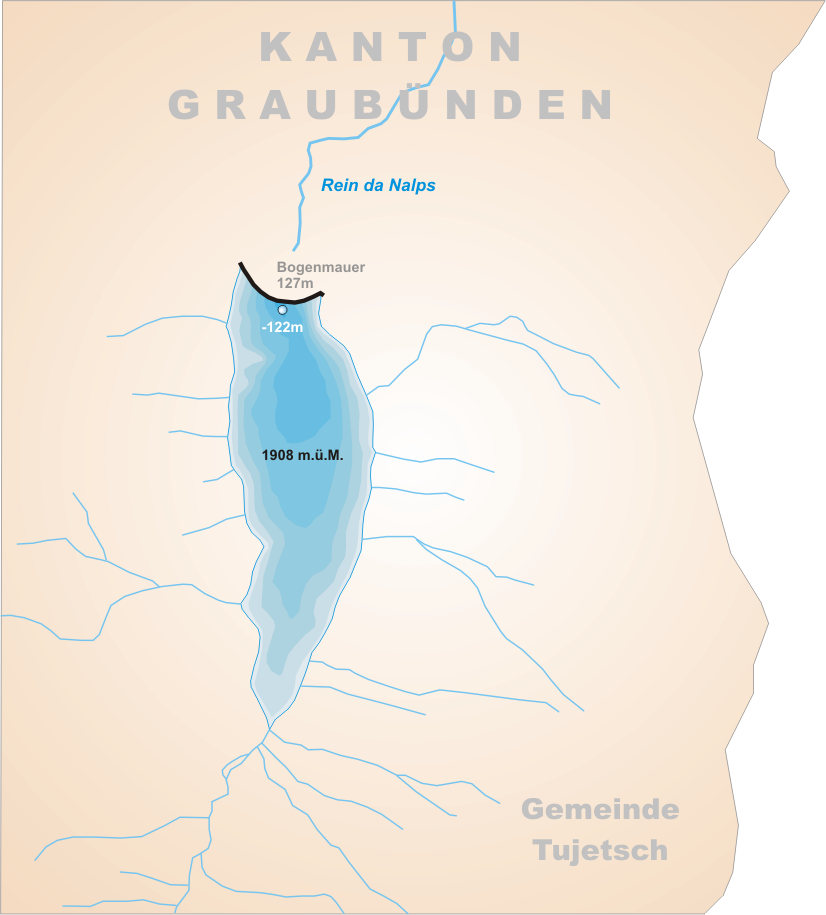
- map
- Location: Grisons
- Coordinates: 46°37′57″N 8°45′48″E
- Type: reservoir
- Catchment area: 22.3 km^{2} (8.6 sq mi)
- Basin countries: Switzerland
- Max. length: 2.0 km (1.2 mi)
- Surface area: 0.91 km^{2} (0.35 sq mi)
- Max. depth: 122 m (400 ft)
- Water volume: 45 million cubic metres (36,000 acre⋅ft)
- Surface elevation: 1,908 m (6,260 ft)

Lai da Nalps is a reservoir in the municipality of Tujetsch, Grisons, Switzerland. It has a capacity of 45 million m³ and a surface area of 0.91 km². The reservoir is connected to Lai da Sontga Maria and Lai da Curnera in neighboring valleys.

== See also ==
- List of lakes of Switzerland
- List of mountain lakes of Switzerland
