= Lac de Moiry =

Reservoir in Grimentz, Switzerland

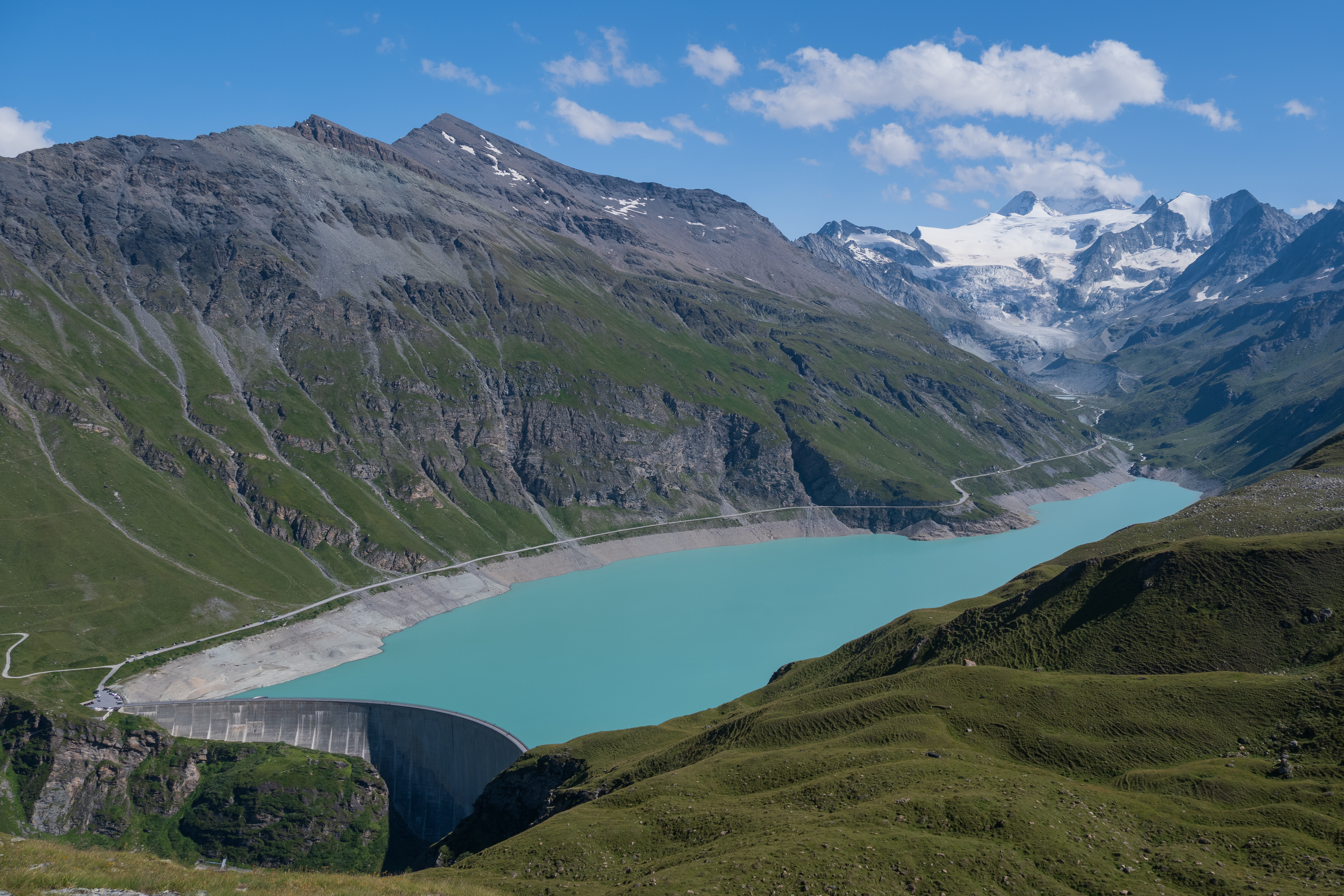

- Location within Canton of Valais Location within Switzerland Location within Alps
- Interactive map of Lac de Moiry
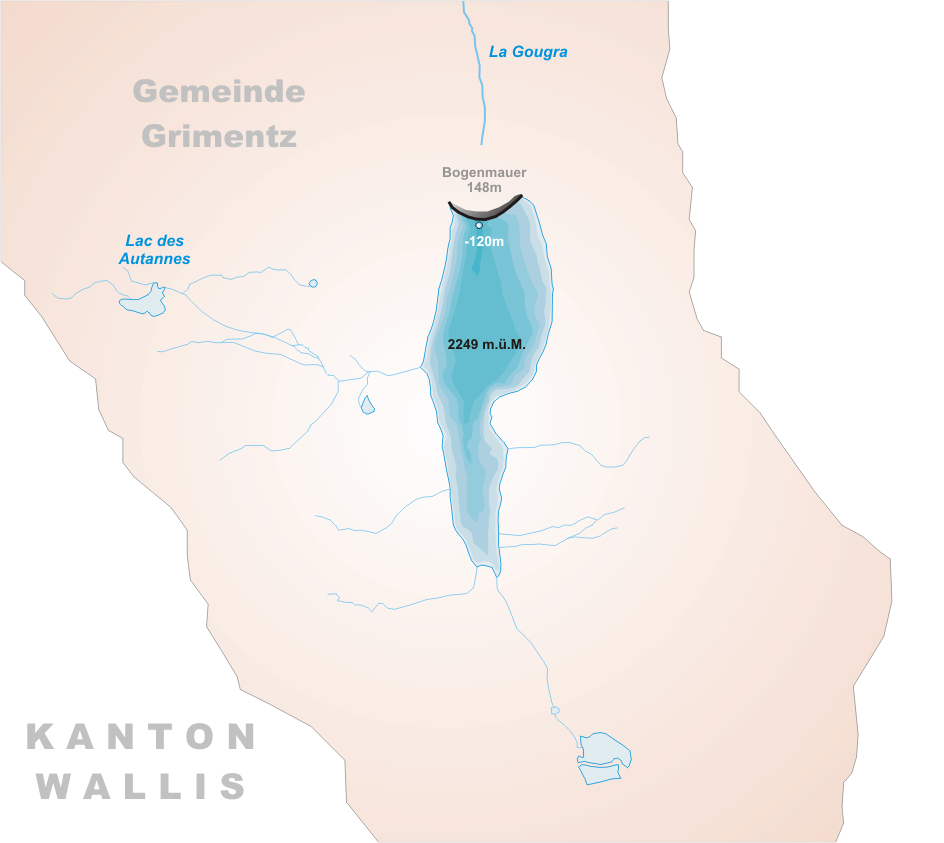
- Map of the lake
- Location: Grimentz, Valais
- Coordinates: 46°7′49″N 7°34′14″E
- Primary outflows: Gougra
- Basin countries: Switzerland
- Surface area: 1.40 km^{2} (0.54 sq mi)
- Max. depth: 120 m (390 ft)
- Water volume: 78 million cubic metres (63,000 acre⋅ft)
- Surface elevation: 2,249 m (7,379 ft)

Lac de Moiry is a reservoir in the municipality of Grimentz, Switzerland.

== Geography ==
The lake has a surface area of 1.40 km^{2} and an elevation of 2,249 m. The maximum depth is 120 m.

The dam is 148 m high and was completed in 1958.

== See also ==
- List of lakes of Switzerland
- List of mountain lakes of Switzerland
