= Lago del Narèt =

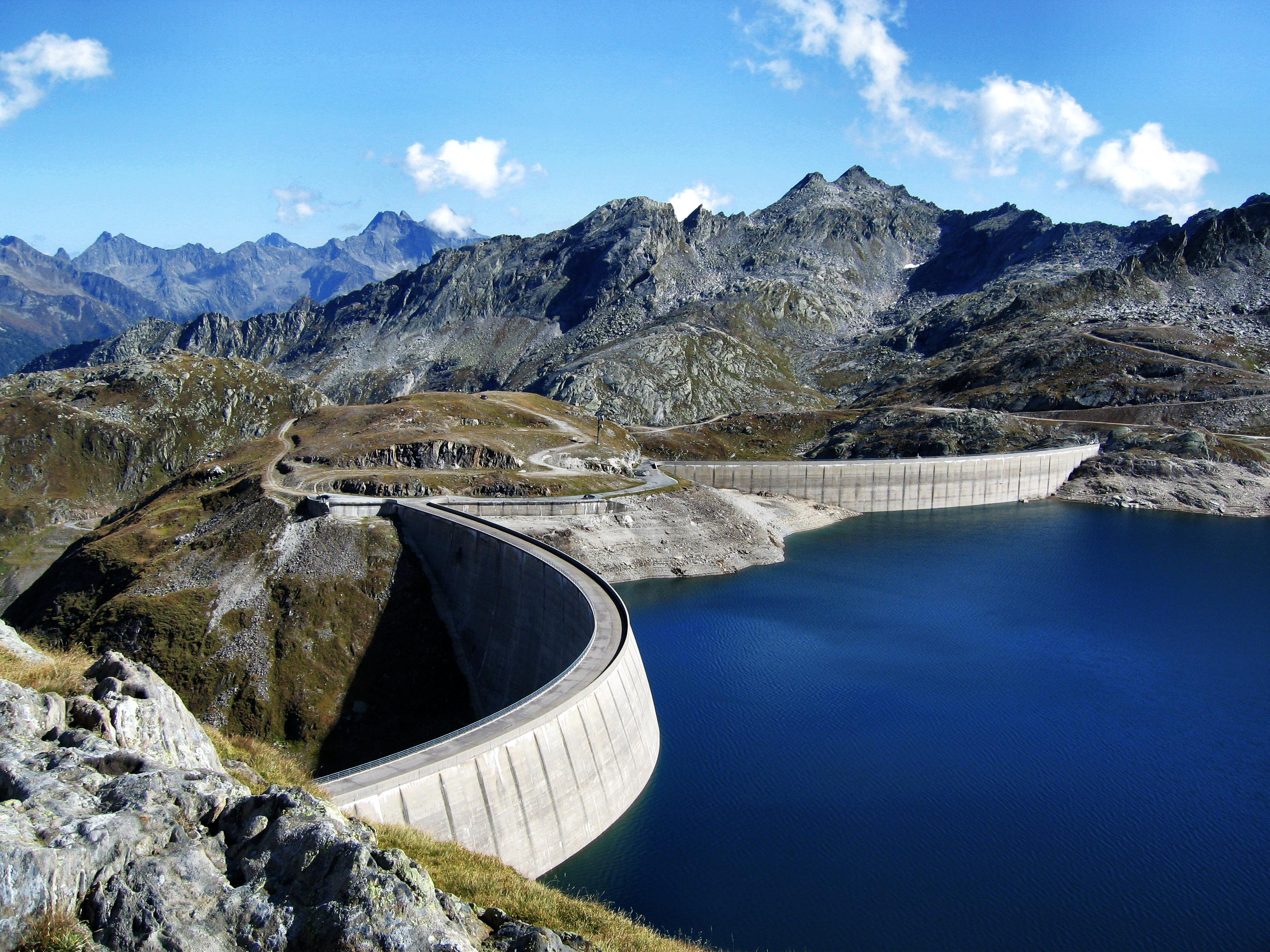

- Location within Canton of Ticino Location within Switzerland Location within Alps
- Interactive map of Lago del Narèt
- Location: Val Sambuco, Ticino
- Coordinates: 46°28′38″N 8°34′8″E
- Type: natural lake, reservoir
- Catchment area: 4.05 km^{2} (1.56 sq mi)
- Basin countries: Switzerland
- Surface area: 0.86 km^{2} (0.33 sq mi)
- Max. depth: 104 m (341 ft)
- Water volume: 31.6 million cubic metres (25,600 acre⋅ft)
- Surface elevation: 2,310 m (7,580 ft)

Lago del Narèt is a lake in Val Sambuco, Ticino, Switzerland. Its surface area is 86 ha (210 acres). It is located in the municipality of Lavizzara. The closest village is Fusio.

== See also ==
- List of lakes of Switzerland
- List of mountain lakes of Switzerland
