= Lago dei Cavagnöö =

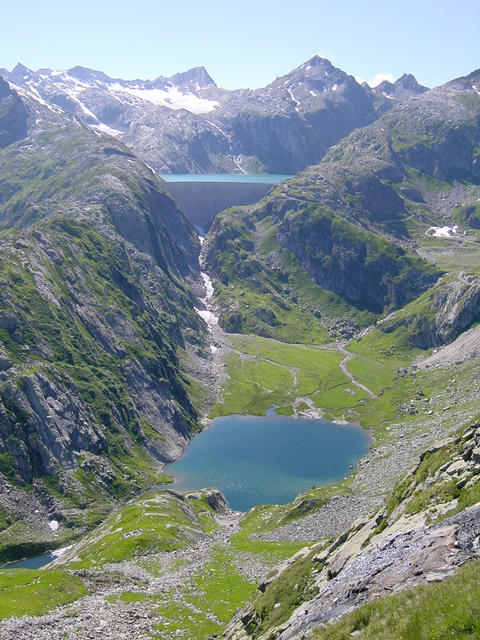
- The lake with Cavagnoli dam and Lago Bianco in the foreground

- Location within Canton of Ticino Location within Switzerland Location within Alps
- Interactive map of Lago dei Cavagnöö
- Location: Ticino
- Coordinates: 46°27′17″N 8°30′4″E
- Type: reservoir
- Primary outflows: Bavona
- Catchment area: 5.05 km^{2} (1.95 sq mi)
- Basin countries: Switzerland
- Max. length: 0.9 km (0.56 mi)
- Surface area: 0.46 km^{2} (0.18 sq mi)
- Max. depth: 100 m (330 ft)
- Water volume: 29 million cubic metres (24,000 acre⋅ft)
- Surface elevation: 2,310 m (7,580 ft)

Lago dei Cavagnöö is a lake in the municipality of Bignasco, Ticino, Switzerland. Its surface area is 0.46 km^{2} (0.18 sq mi).

The arch dam Cavagnoli has a height of 111 m. It was completed in 1968.

== See also ==
- List of lakes of Switzerland
- List of mountain lakes of Switzerland
