= List of islands of Switzerland =

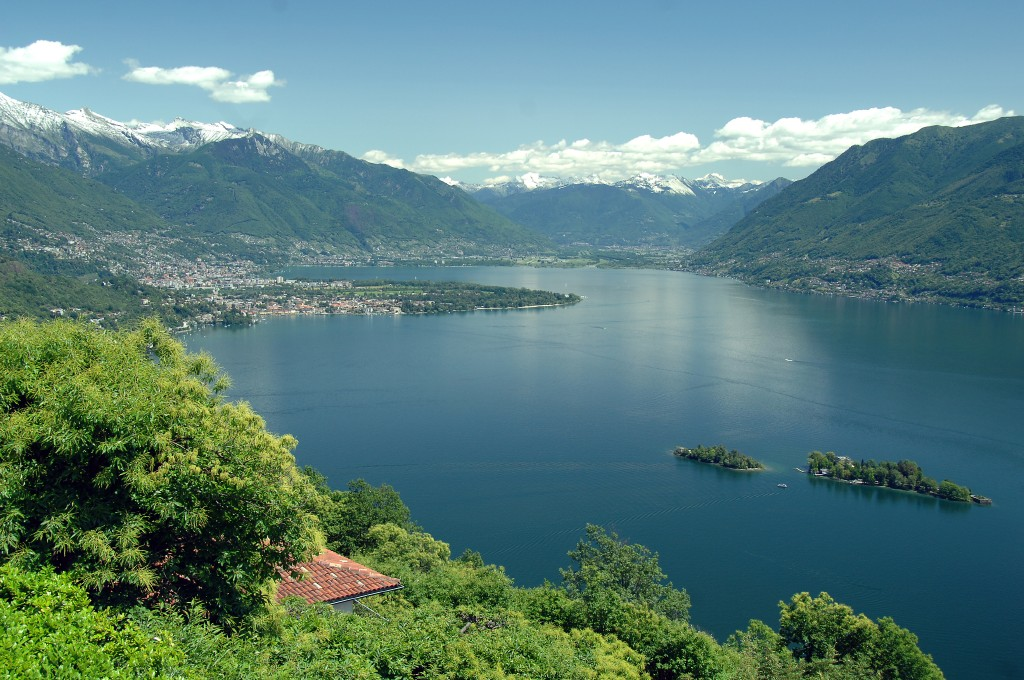
San Pancrazio and Sant'Apollinare (Brissago Islands) are the farthest islands from the mainland.

This is a list of islands of Switzerland. Switzerland is a landlocked country, hence all Swiss islands are located in lakes or rivers. This list also includes islands in artificial lakes (*). In these cases, the water levels may drop by a few metres at some periods of the year, thereby turning some islands into peninsulas.

Island	Body of water	Municipality	Canton	Area (ha)	Highest elevation	Prominence	Distance from the shore	Bridge
Aareinseli	Aare	Selzach	Solothurn	1.3	428 m (1,404 ft)	1 m (3 ft)	50 m (160 ft)	No
Altstad-Insel	Lake Lucerne	Meggen	Lucerne	0.31	435 m (1,427 ft)	1 m (3 ft)	50 m (160 ft)	No
Bälliz	Aare	Thun	Bern	5.4				Yes
Bauschänzli	Limmat	Zurich	Zurich					Yes
Chaviolas	Lake Sils	Sils	Graubünden	0.34	1,809 m (5,935 ft)	12 m (39 ft)	200 m (660 ft)	No
Chillon	Lake Geneva	Veytaux	Vaud				10 m (30 ft)	Yes
Entlibühl	Lake Constance	Gottlieben	Thurgau	0.11			30 m (98 ft)	No
Fischergrieni	Aare	Stilli	Aargau	2.65	328 m (1,076 ft)	1 m (3 ft)	30 m (100 ft)	No
Gamma Insel	Lake Sempach	Sursee	Lucerne	0.1	505 m (1,657 ft)	1 m (3 ft)	150 m (490 ft)	No
La Grande Ile	Lake Murten	Haut-Vully	Fribourg	0.06	430 m (1,411 ft)	1 m (3 ft)	60 m (200 ft)	No
Grien	Aare	Aarau	Aargau	34				No
Grien	Rhine	Koblenz	Aargau	1.9				No
Heidseeinseln	Lake Heidsee	Vaz/Obervaz	Graubünden					No
Ile de la Harpe	Lake Geneva	Rolle	Vaud	0.237	373 m (1,224 ft)	1 m (3 ft)	70 m (230 ft)	No
Ile d'Ogoz	Lake of Gruyère*	Pont-en-Ogoz	Fribourg	0.5	688 m (2,257 ft)	11 m (36 ft)	160 m (520 ft)	No
Île de Peilz	Lake Geneva	Villeneuve	Vaud	0.004	374 m (1,227 ft)	2 m (7 ft)	500 m (1,640 ft)	No
Ile Rousseau	Rhone	Geneva	Geneva	0.2	373 m (1,224 ft)	1 m (3 ft)	60 m (200 ft)	Yes
Insel Rheinau	Rhine	Rheinau	Zürich	3.47	358 m (1,175 ft)	5 m (16 ft)	40 m (130 ft)	Yes
Inseli	Lake Zug	Zug	Zug	0.02	414 m (1,358 ft)	1 m (3 ft)	100 m (330 ft)	No
Isola di Giornico	Ticino	Giornico	Ticino	0.67	358 m (1,175 ft)	5 m (16 ft)	^	Yes
L'île	Rhone	Geneva	Geneva	1.25	374 m (1,227 ft)		34 m (110 ft)	Yes
Lützelau	Lake Zurich	Freienbach	Schwyz	3.5	414 m (1,358 ft)	8 m (26 ft)	400 m (1,310 ft)	No
Roggenburg	Lake Lauerz	Lauerz	Schwyz	0.075	448 m (1,470 ft)	1 m (3 ft)	80 m (260 ft)	No
Ruppoldingen	Aare	Olten	Solothurn					Yes
Saffa-Insel	Lake Zurich	Zürich	Zürich	0.3	407 m (1,335 ft)	1 m (3 ft)	30 m (100 ft)	Yes
San Pancrazio (Brissago Islands)	Lake Maggiore	Brissago, Ronco sopra Ascona	Ticino	2.25	200 m (656 ft)	7 m (23 ft)	1,040 m (3,410 ft)	No (Note: The island has a landing stage served by ships of Navigazione Laghi)
Sant'Apollinare (Brissago Islands)	Lake Maggiore	Brissago, Ronco sopra Ascona	Ticino	0.7	200 m (656 ft)	7 m (23 ft)	930 m (3,050 ft)	No
Schacheninseli	Aare	Villnachern	Aargau	88				Yes
Schlossinseli	Lake Mauensee	Mauensee	Lucerne	1.5	512 m (1,680 ft)	8 m (26 ft)	50 m (160 ft)	Yes
Schnäggeninseli	Lake Brienz	Iseltwald	Berne	0.165	570 m (1,870 ft)	6 m (20 ft)	300 m (980 ft)	No
Schnittlauchinsel	Lake Walen	Quarten	St. Gallen	0.08	420 m (1,378 ft)	1 m (3 ft)	320 m (1,050 ft)	No
Schönenwerd	Lake Zurich	Richterswil	Zürich	0.15	407 m (1,335 ft)	1 m (3 ft)	230 m (750 ft)	No
Schwanau	Lake Lauerz	Lauerz	Schwyz	0.57	469 m (1,539 ft)	22 m (72 ft)	120 m (390 ft)	No
St. Peter's Island	Lake Biel	Twann	Bern	150	474 m (1,555 ft)	45 m (148 ft)	30 m (100 ft)	Yes
Ufenau	Lake Zurich	Freienbach	Schwyz	11.26	423 m (1,388 ft)	17 m (56 ft)	900 m (2,950 ft)	No (Note: The island has a landing stage served by ships of the Lake Zurich navigation company)
Vogelraupfi	Aare	Bannwil	Bern	1.4				No
Werd	Lake Constance	Eschenz	Thurgau	1.59	398 m (1,306 ft)	2 m (7 ft)	120 m (390 ft)	Yes
Werdinsel	Limmat	Zürich	Zürich	7.9	398 m (1,306 ft)	2 m (7 ft)	20 m (70 ft)	Yes
Unnamed islet	Lake Wohlen*	Frauenkappelen	Bern	0.82	482 m (1,581 ft)	1 m (3 ft)	40 m (130 ft)	No
Unnamed islet	Lake of Gruyère*	Pont-en-Ogoz	Fribourg	1.2	682 m (2,238 ft)	5 m (16 ft)	100 m (330 ft)	No
Unnamed islet	Lake of Gruyère*	Pont-la-Ville	Fribourg		678 m (2,224 ft)	1 m (3 ft)	280 m (920 ft)	No
Unnamed islet	Lake of Gruyère*	Pont-la-Ville	Fribourg		678 m (2,224 ft)	1 m (3 ft)	120 m (390 ft)	No
Unnamed islet	Lake of Gruyère*	Corbières	Fribourg		678 m (2,224 ft)	1 m (3 ft)	100 m (330 ft)	No
Unnamed islet	Lake Hinterstockensee	Erlenbach im Simmental	Bern	0.32	1,602 m (5,256 ft)	7 m (23 ft)	20 m (70 ft)	No
Unnamed islet	Lake Caumasee	Flims	Graubünden	0.3	1,000 m (3,281 ft)	3 m (10 ft)	40 m (130 ft)	No
Unnamed islet	Lake Moesola	Mesocco	Graubünden		2,069 m (6,788 ft)	7 m (23 ft)	50 m (160 ft)	No
Unnamed islet	Lake Totensee	Obergoms	Valais		2,162 m (7,093 ft)	2 m (7 ft)	80 m (260 ft)	No
Unnamed islet	Lake Tannensee*	Kerns	Obwalden		1,977 m (6,486 ft)	1 m (3 ft)	80 m (260 ft)	No
Unnamed islet	Lake Sils	Sils	Graubünden		1,798 m (5,899 ft)	1 m (3 ft)	140 m (460 ft)	No
Unnamed islet	Lake Klingnauersee*	Böttstein	Aargau					No
Islands at the confluence of Aar, Reuss and Limmat	Aare	Gebenstorf, Turgi	Argau					No
Unnamed islet	Doubs	Epiquerez	Jura					No
Unnamed islet	Lake Mauensee	Mauensee	Lucerne		505 m (1,657 ft)	1 m (3 ft)	120 m (390 ft)	No
Unnamed islet	Lake Mauensee	Mauensee	Lucerne		505 m (1,657 ft)	1 m (3 ft)	180 m (590 ft)	No
Unnamed islet	Lake Mauensee	Mauensee	Lucerne		505 m (1,657 ft)	1 m (3 ft)	50 m (160 ft)	No

Colors
Islands in lakes
Islands in rivers

== See also ==
- List of lakes of Switzerland
- List of rivers of Switzerland
- List of islands
