= Anne S. Bushby =

- Born: c. 1798; Saint Croix
- Died: April 3, 1872; London
- Children: Arthur Thomas Bushby
- Father: William Stedman

Anne Sarah Bushby (1798? – 3 April 1872) was a Scottish writer, poet, and translator. She was one of the earliest translators of Hans Christian Andersen from Danish into English.

Anne Sarah Stedman was born on the island of Saint Croix in the West Indies, then a Dutch territory. She was the daughter of Scottish physician William Stedman and Elizabeth Gordon Stedman. In 1823 she married Cumbrian merchant Joseph Bushby. In 1829, the family relocated from Saint Croix to Liverpool, England, and then permanently settled in the Kensington area of London.

Bushby translated from French, Danish, Spanish and German, but she had a particular affinity for Denmark, writing English language poems supporting Denmark and deriding England for staying neutral in the Second Schleswig War. She translated Meïr Aron Goldschmidt's En Jøde (1845) as The Jew of Denmark (1853). She translated a number of the plays of Johan Ludvig Heiberg but failed to get them performed or published. Her three volume The Danes Sketched by Themselves (1864) included translations of poetry and short stories by Danish authors including Carl Bernhard, Steen Steensen Blicher, Adam Oehlenschläger, and Hans Christian Andersen.

Bushby first met Hans Christian Andersen during his first visit to London in 1847 and at the suggestion of his English publisher Richard Bentley in 1853, she replaced his translator Charles Beckwith Lohmeyer. A Poet's Day Dreams (1853) includes 20 of her translations of Andersen, including "There is a Difference" (51), "It is Very True" (58), "Grief of Heart" (60), "Everything in its Right Place" (61), "The Nis at the Cheesemonger's" (62), "A Good-for-Nothing" (65), and '"The Last Pearl" (67). The Sand-hills of Jutland (1860) contains 18 more taken from Nye Eventyr og Historier, including "A Row of Pearls" (75), "The Bell's Hollow" (76), "Something" (80), "The Mud-King's Daughter" (83), "The Wind Relates the Story of Valdemar Daae and his Daughters" (86), "Charming" (94), and "The Sand-Hills of Jutland" (95). The Ice Maiden (1863) contains four from Nye Eventyr og Historier, Anden Række, II: "The Butterfly" (98), "The Ice Maiden" (106), "Psyche" (107), and "The Snail and the Rosebush" (108). She translated his novel Være eller ikke Være (1857) as To Be, or Not to Be? (1857) and his travelogue i Spanien (1863) as In Spain (1864). She also translated many of his poems, devoting 75 pages to her translations of his work (likely from an unrealized publishing project) in Poems (1876). Some, including Andersen biographer Elias Bredsdorff, were highly critical of her translations and her mistakes within. Recent scholarship has identified reappraised the overall value of her translations.

Along with her translations, Bushby also published her own work, including poems and short stories, particularly in The Monthly Magazine and The New Monthly Magazine. These include a serialized novel, Woodbury (1865), and the ghost stories "The Haunted Ship" (1857) and "The Spectre's Visit" (1859).

Anne Sarah Bushby died on 3 April 1872 in London.

== Bibliography ==
- Poems. London: Bentley & Son. 1876. Includes translations from French, Danish, Spanish, and German.

=== Translations ===
- The Jew of Denmark. 1853. Translation of M.A. Goldschmidt's En Jøde.
- A Poet's Day Dreams. Twenty tales. London: Richard Bentley, 1853.
- To Be, or Not to Be? London: Richard Bentley, 1857. Translation of At vere eller ikke vere? (1857)
- The Sand-Hills of Jutland. With Seventeen Other Tales.. London: Richard Bentley, 1860.
- The Ice-Maiden. London: Richard Bentley, 1863.
- The Danes Sketched by Themselves. 3 vols. London: Richard Bentley, 1864.
- In Spain. London: Richard Bentley, 1864. Translation of I Spanien (1863)
- The Ice-Maidens and Other Stories. London: Griffith & Farran, 1875.
