= Reeti =

Mountain in Switzerland

- Rötihorn
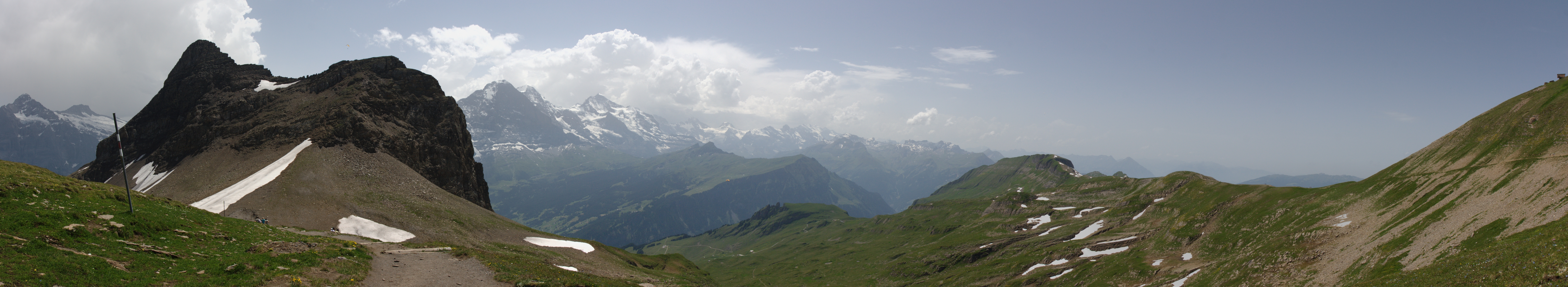
- The Reeti (left summit) from the Faulhorn

Highest point
- Elevation: 2,757 m (9,045 ft)
- Prominence: 341 m (1,119 ft)
- Parent peak: Schwarzhorn
- Listing: Alpine mountains 2500-2999 m
- Coordinates: 46°39′53.9″N 8°0′41.6″E

Geography
- Location within Switzerland
- Location: Bern, Switzerland
- Parent range: Bernese Alps

The Reeti (also known as Rötihorn) is a mountain of the Bernese Alps, overlooking Grindelwald in the Bernese Oberland.

From the Bachalpsee, a trail leads to the summit.
