= Île de Peilz =

Small island in Lake Geneva, Switzerland

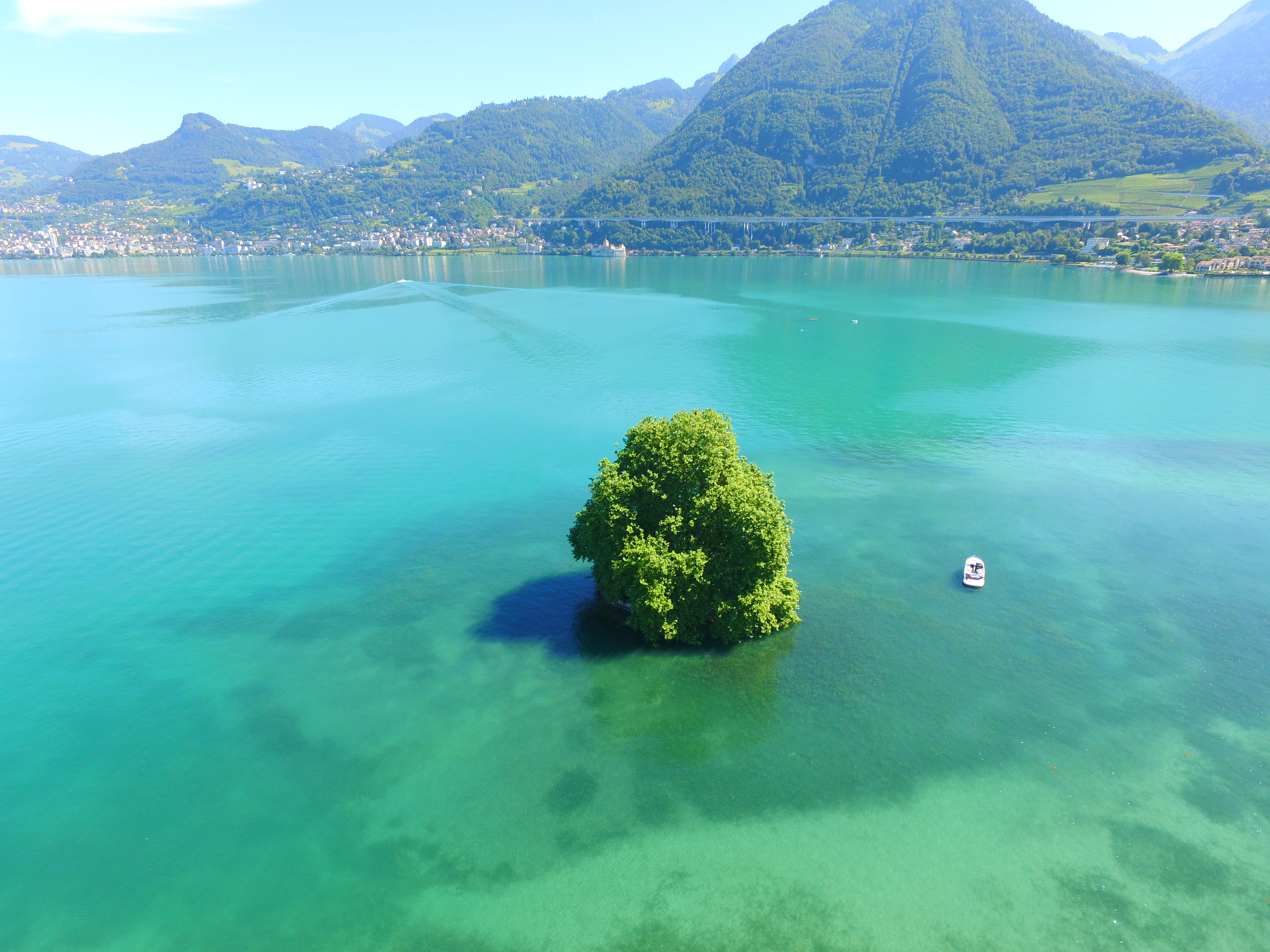
- Interactive map of Île de Peilz

Geography
- Location: Lake Geneva
- Coordinates: 46°24′00″N 06°54′50″E
- Area: 20 to 77 m^{2} (220 to 830 sq ft)
- Switzerland
- Canton of Vaud

Demographics
- Population: 0

The Île de Peilz (French pronunciation: [il də pɛ]; Peilz Island) is a minute island at the eastern end of Lake Geneva in Switzerland, close to Villeneuve, Vaud. Measuring a few dozen square metres and featuring a monumental London plane tree, it is the smallest and the only natural island in the lake.

Its history is unclear, but it was built up in its current form in the 18th century. It has left cultural traces in the works of Lord Byron and Hans Christian Andersen, as well as in local legend. More recently, it has become a popular subject of social media photographs.

== Name ==
The island is named after the municipality of La Tour-de-Peilz, west of Montreux. That village once comprised land close to the river mouth of the Rhône, near which the island lies.

The origin of the name Peilz is unclear. It might derive from the Latin pilosus, which became poilu in French, indicating the presence of a forest. Or it might have originated from the Gaulish word blaidd (wolf).

== Topography ==
The Île de Peilz lies about 500 metres off the mouth of the Eau Froide river, which constitutes the border between the municipalities of Noville and Villeneuve. The mouth of the Rhône lies about a kilometre to the west of that of the Eau Froide. Because of the risk of running aground, access to the island by boat is not recommended.

According to conflicting sources, the island has a surface area of 20, 40 or 77 square metres. It is thought to be the only natural island of Lake Geneva, as well as the smallest and the farthest from the shore. Its only vegetation is a large London plane tree, as well as some shrubs.

== History ==
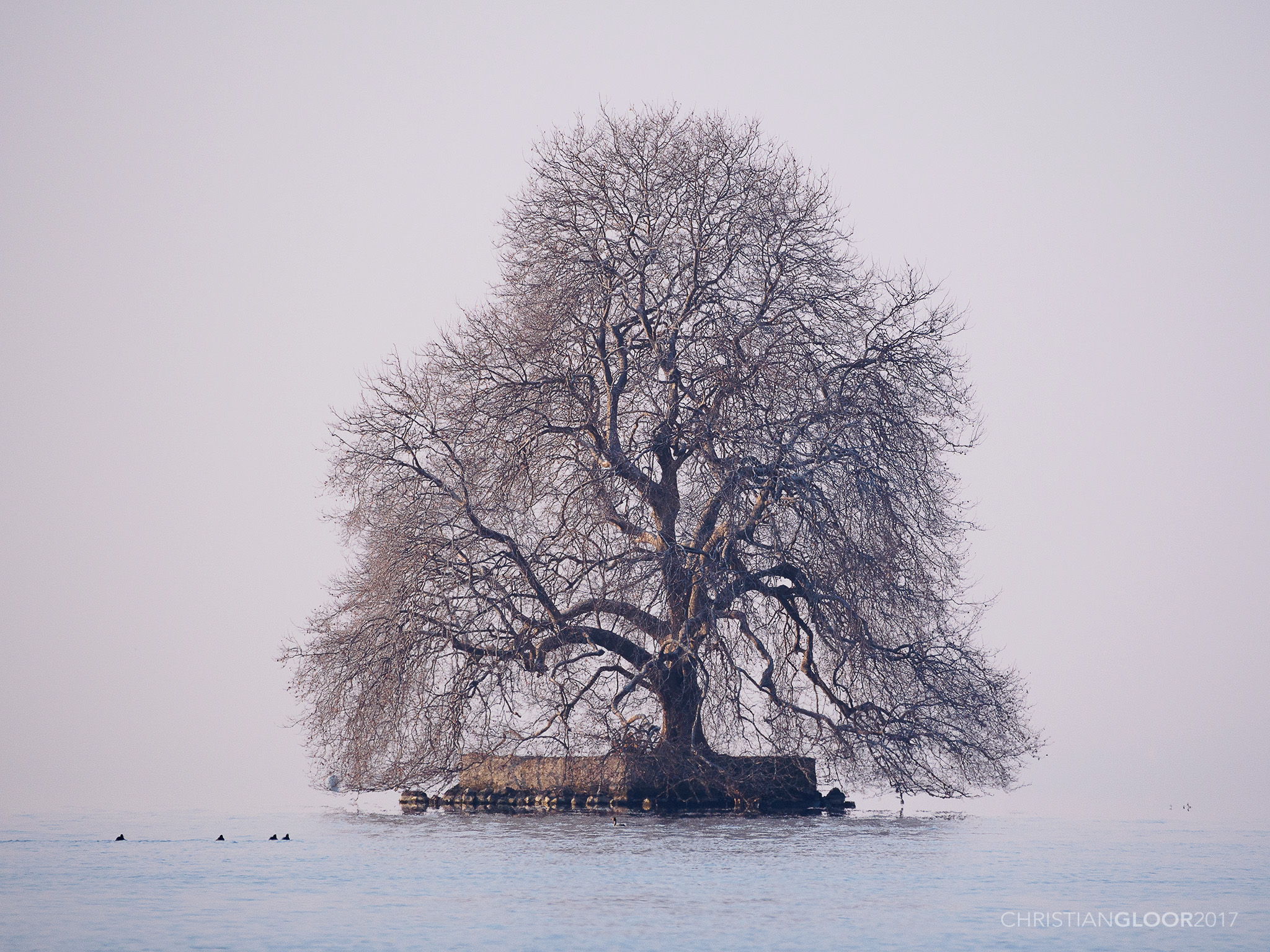
The Île de Peilz in winter (2017)

The history of the island remains largely obscure, even though it is quite old.

Local tradition has it that the island was a simple rock until 1797, when it was covered by earth and surrounded by a supporting wall by the people of Villeneuve. No primary sources exist to support this account, and it is difficult to guess what the reason for such a costly enterprise might have been. Still, a wall was clearly built towards the end of the 18th century, then repaired in 1820. In 1851, the island was again substantially restored with the proceeds of a public subscription of 1846. A wooden house, of which no trace remains, was supposedly also built then. Other stories about the island's history are of a legendary nature (see below).

The tree on the island was planted in 1851, when three poplars were replaced with London planes and horse-chestnuts. By 1944, one of the trees had dried out, and by 1970, only one London plane and a sickly horse-chestnut remained. The latter has since disappeared, and only a few shrubs remain apart from the plane.

In 2010, the surrounding wall, damaged by the tree's roots, was again repaired by the municipal authorities of Villeneuve, like the wall of the Île Rousseau at the other end of the lake.

== In culture ==
=== Lord Byron ===
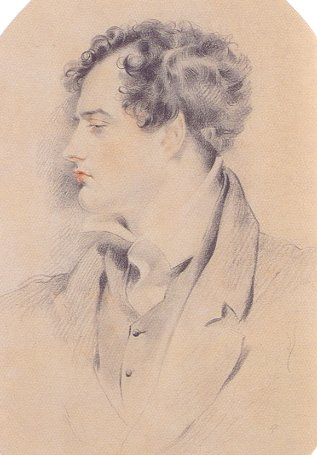
Lord Byron in 1816

The British poet Lord Byron described the island in 1816 (the Year Without a Summer) in his narrative poem The Prisoner of Chillon:

"And then there was a little isle,
Which in my very face did smile,
The only one in view;
A small green isle, it seemed no more,
Scarce broader than my dungeon floor,
But in it there were three tall trees,
And o'er it blew the mountain breeze,
And by it there were waters flowing,
And on it there were young flowers growing,
Of gentle breath and hue."

=== Legends ===
Video of the Île de Peilz

According to a local story told about the island, in the middle of the 19th century a young English couple stayed at the Hôtel Byron, close to Chillon Castle. When they bathed in the lake, the young man drowned, and his body was found further out in the lake. On that spot, his fiancée had the "Île de Paix" (Peace Island) built as a memorial, whose name later devolved into "Île de Peilz", also called "Island of Two Lovers".

This legend was adapted in 1861 by the Danish writer Hans Christian Andersen in his tale The Ice-Maiden, in which the island is the setting for the tale's denouement:

"Yonder, where the Rhone glides along under Savoy's snow-topped mountains and not far from its mouth, in the lake lies a little island, indeed it is so small, that from the coast it is taken for a vessel. It is a valley between the rocks, which a lady caused to be dammed up a hundred years ago and to be covered with earth and planted with three acacia-trees, which now shade the whole island."

In Andersen's tale, the lovers Rudy and Babette visit the island to dance before their wedding. As they sit and talk together, Babette notices the boat is slipping away. Rudy dives into the water after it but the malevolent Ice-Maiden, whom he escaped earlier in his youth, kisses him one last time and he drowns.

According to another legend, the Swiss federal government once offered the island as a gift to Queen Victoria as she visited the region. Depending on the version of that story, the Queen either later discovered that she would owe taxes on the island and therefore returned it to Switzerland, or she kept it in the possession of the British royal family. Numerous versions of this legend circulate in the region, all of which involve Queen Victoria in some manner. There is no record of any such transaction, and it would not have been possible because the island was never the property of the federal government.

According to the municipal archivist of Villeneuve, there is no historical evidence for any of these legends.

=== Social media ===
As of 2021, the picturesque Île de Peilz is increasingly popular as a setting for Instagram and other social media photography.

== See also ==
- List of islands of Switzerland
