= First (Grindelwald) =

Summit of the Schwarzhorn in Switzerland

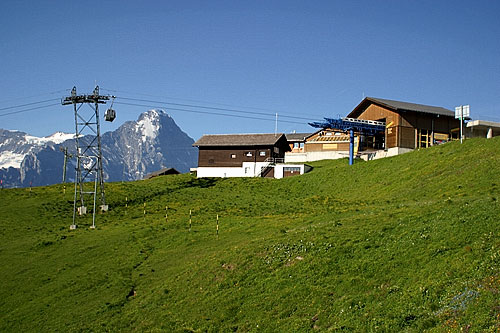
- View of First with the Eiger in background

Highest point
- Elevation: 2,184 m (7,165 ft)
- Coordinates: 46°39′38″N 8°3′13″E

Geography
- Location within Switzerland
- Location: Bernese Oberland, Switzerland
- Parent range: Bernese Alps

Climbing
- Easiest route: Aerial tramway

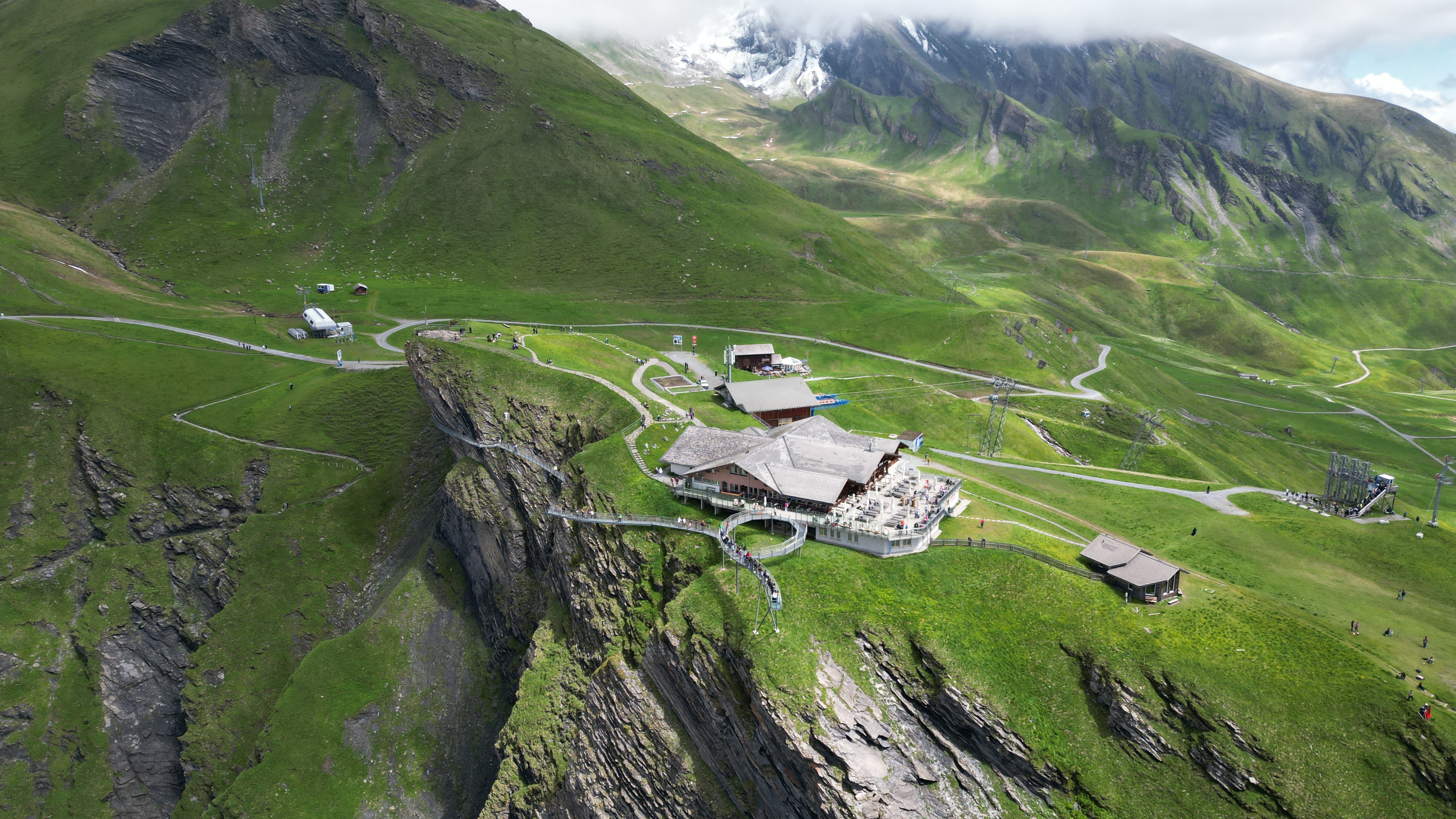
The First cable car station 100622

First is a mountain location and minor summit on the slopes of the Schwarzhorn in the Bernese Oberland. It is mostly known as a cable car station above Grindelwald (Firstbahn) and as a popular hiking area with the Bachalpsee in proximity. It is also the destination of the classic hike: Schynige Platte-Faulhorn-First.

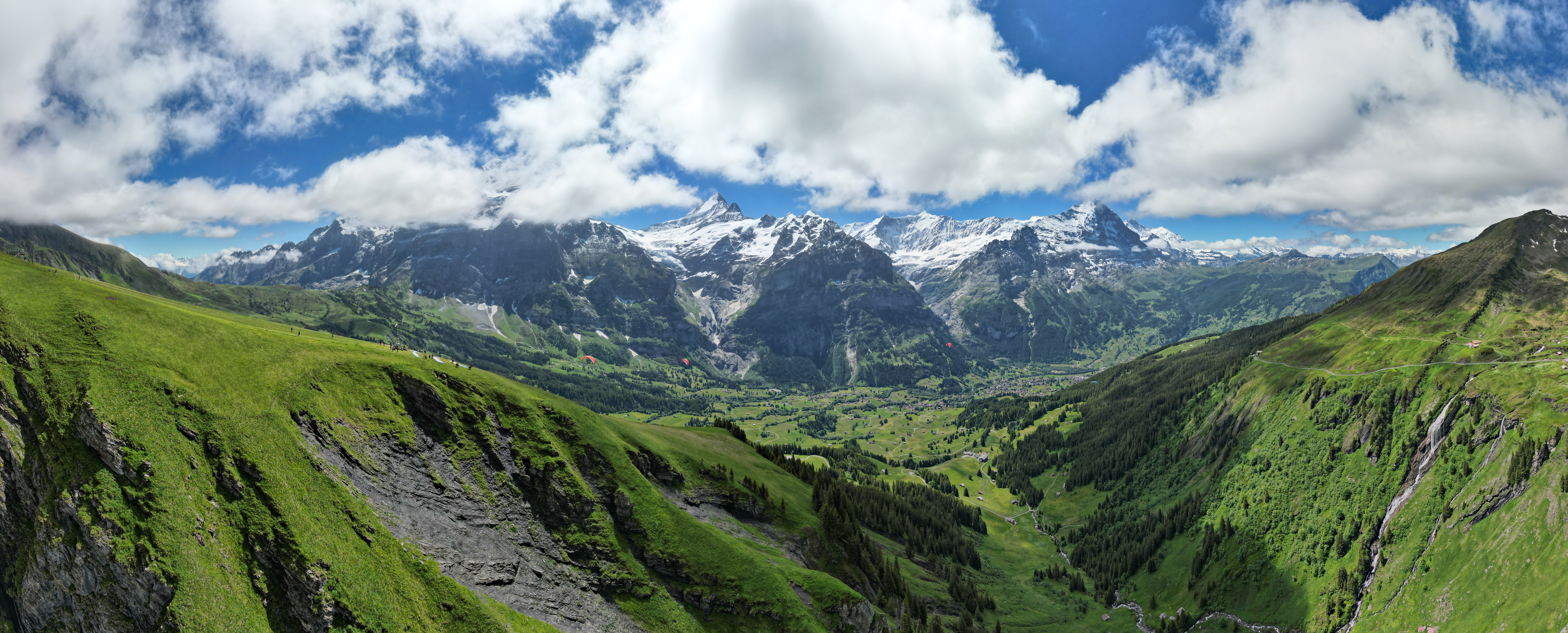
The Eiger, Monch and Jungfrau from the First cable car station
