= Schnäggeninseli =

Island in Lake Brienz, Switzerland

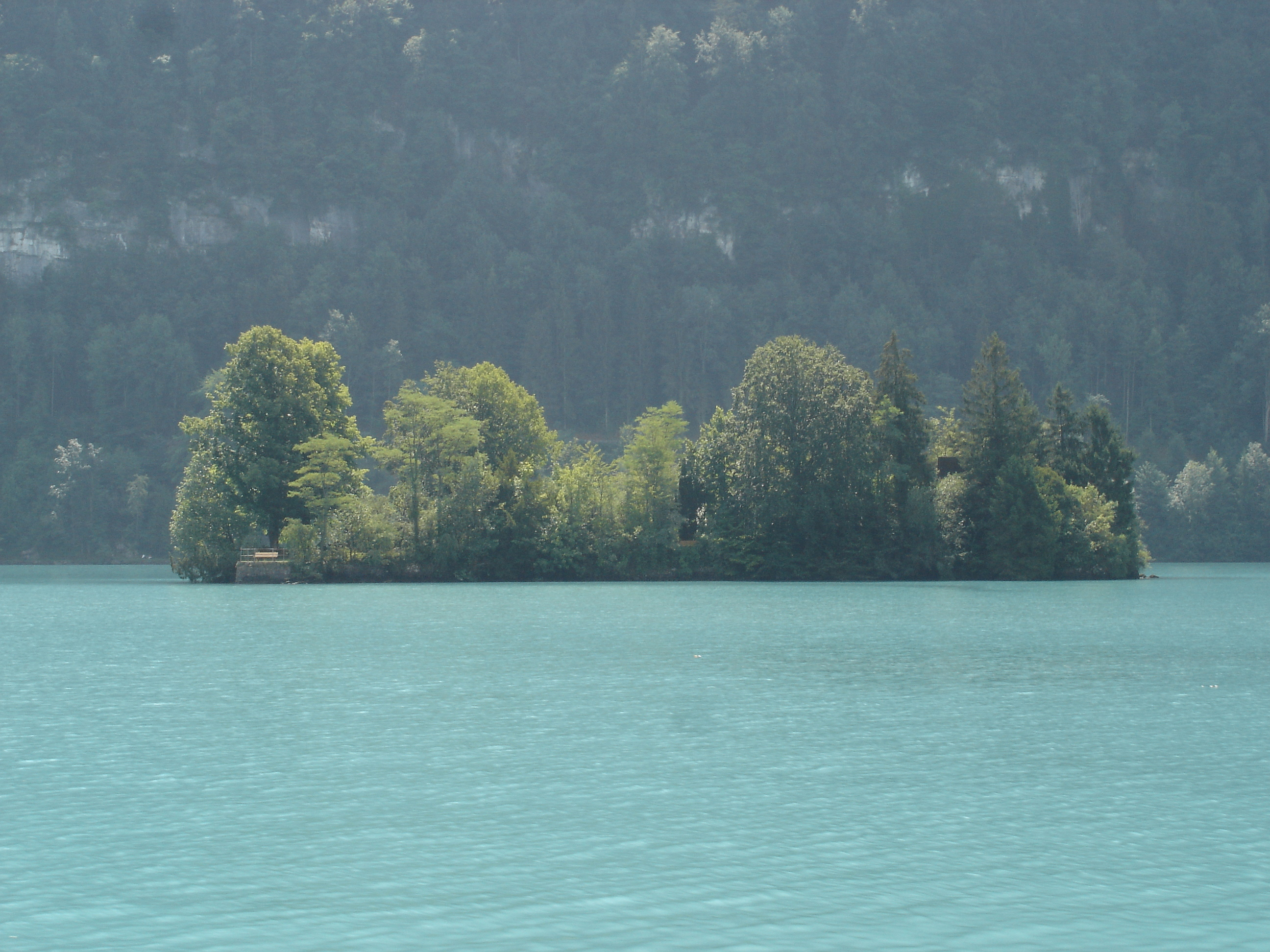
- View from the north side

- Location within Canton of Bern Location within Switzerland Location within Alps
- Interactive map of Schnäggeninseli

Geography
- Location: Lake Brienz
- Coordinates: 46°42′59″N 7°58′21″E
- Highest elevation: 570 m (1870 ft)

Administration
- Switzerland
- Canton: Bern
- District: Interlaken-Oberhasli

The Schnäggeninseli (German, lit. "snail island") is an island in Lake Brienz, located in the Bernese Oberland. It is the only island in the lake and among the largest in the Bernese Oberland. The island has a maximum length of 115 metres and a maximum width of 40 metres. Its highest point is 570 metres above sea level or 6 metres above lake level (564 m). The distance from the shore is about 300 metres. The island is private property and belongs to the Schloss Seeburg.

Politically the island belongs to the municipality of Iseltwald in the district of Interlaken-Oberhasli.

== See also ==
- List of islands of Switzerland
