= Stockhorn =

Mountain in Switzerland

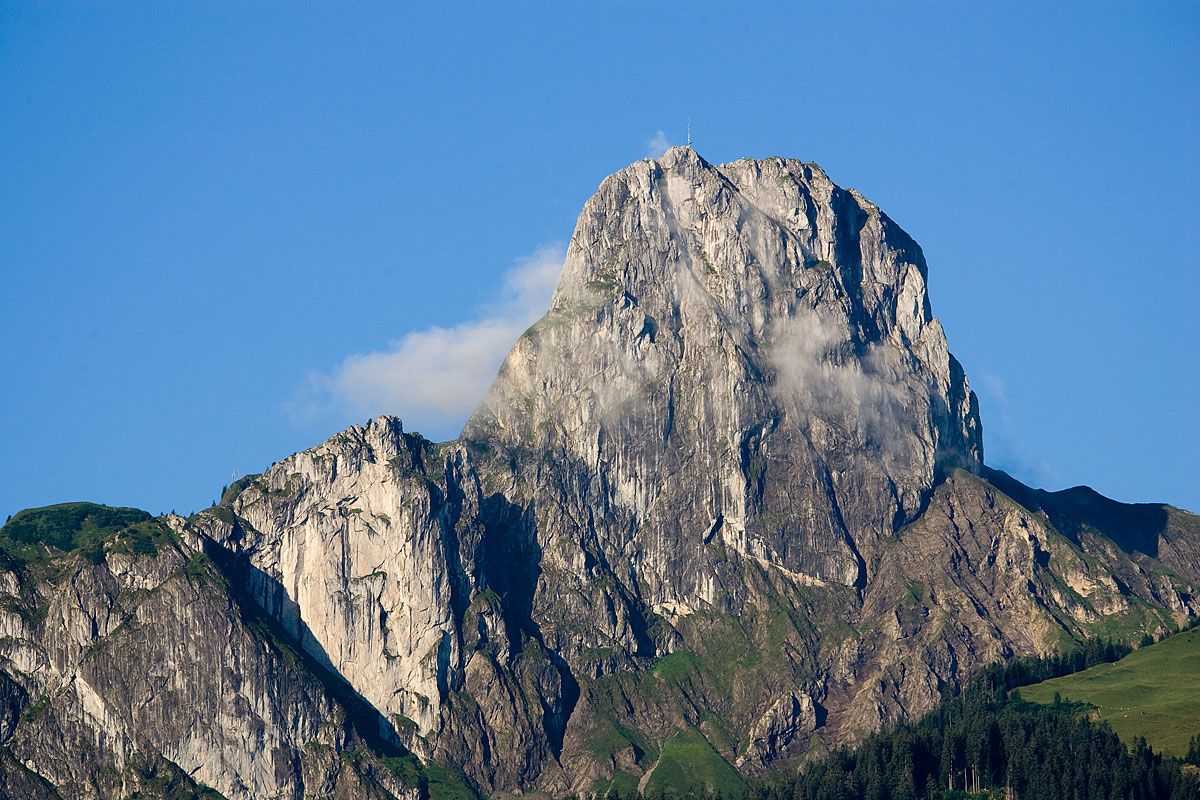
- North side

Highest point
- Elevation: 2,190 m (7,190 ft)
- Prominence: 399 m (1,309 ft)
- Parent peak: Schafberg
- Isolation: 9.1 km (5.7 mi)
- Coordinates: 46°41′38″N 7°32′15″E

Geography
- Location within Switzerland
- Location: Bern, Switzerland
- Parent range: Bernese Alps

Climbing
- Easiest route: Cable car

The Stockhorn is a mountain of the Bernese Alps, overlooking the region of Lake Thun in the Bernese Oberland. It is located north of the town of Erlenbach im Simmental.

The Stockhorn is 2,190 m (7,190 ft) high and is accessible via cable car from Erlenbach. It has a restaurant at the top and is a good starting point for many hikes. There is good fishing in the two lakes right below the Stockhorn, the Oberstockensee (around 1,650 m [5,410 ft] high) and the Hinterstockensee (around 1,550 m [5,090 ft] high). There is a subterranean water connection between the two lakes.

From the top the view includes many of the surrounding Alps; the Eiger, Mönch, Jungfrau, Schreckhorn, along with the valley of the Aare river, Thun and Lake Thun, Interlaken and the Jura Mountains.

== See also ==
- List of mountains of Switzerland accessible by public transport
