= Hinterstockensee =

Lake in Switzerland

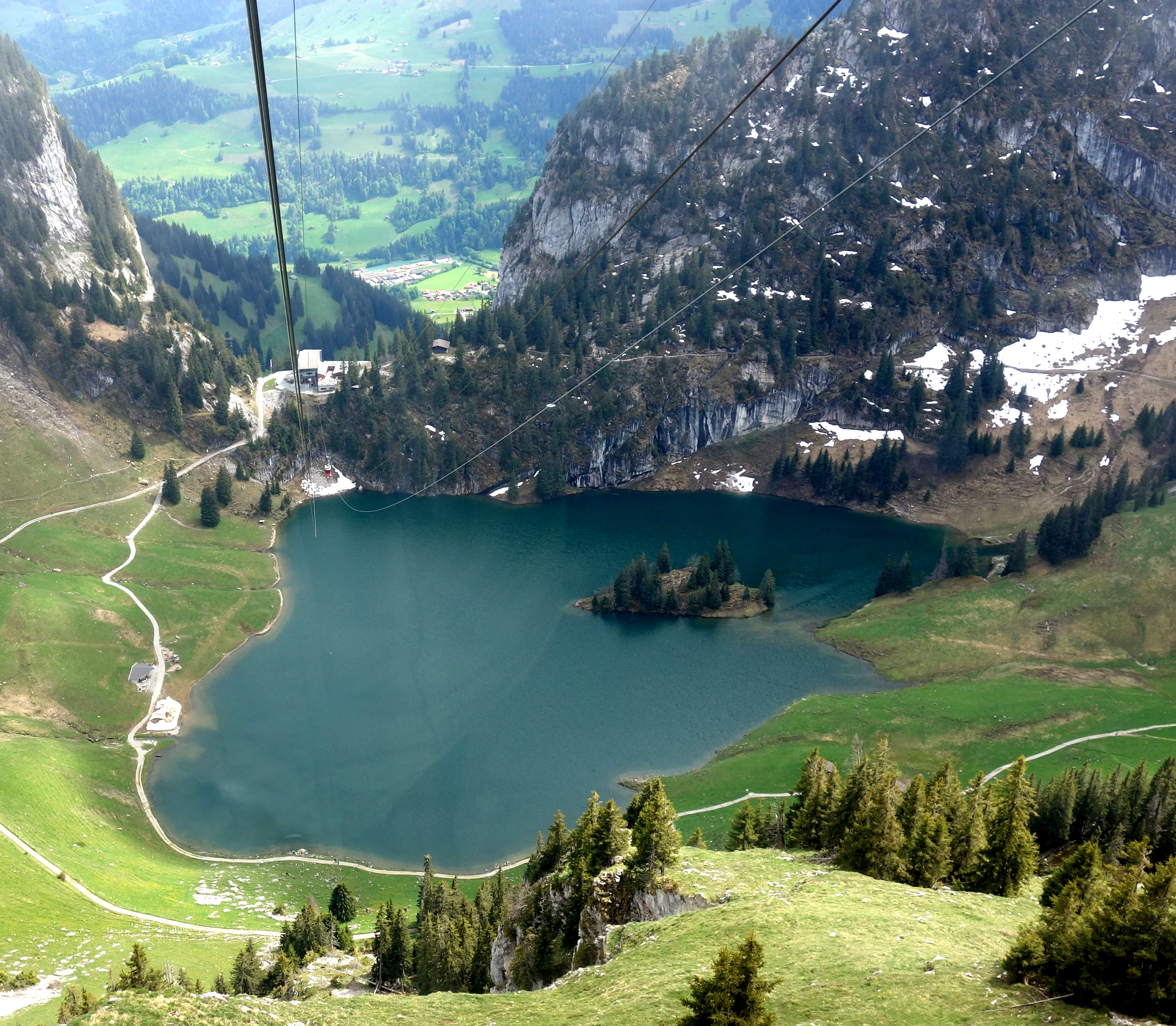

- Location within Canton of Bern Location within Switzerland Location within Alps
- Interactive map of Hinterstockensee
- Location: Canton of Bern
- Coordinates: 46°41′09″N 7°32′25″E
- Basin countries: Switzerland
- Surface area: 8 ha (20 acres)
- Max. depth: 18 m (59 ft)
- Surface elevation: 1,595 m (5,233 ft)

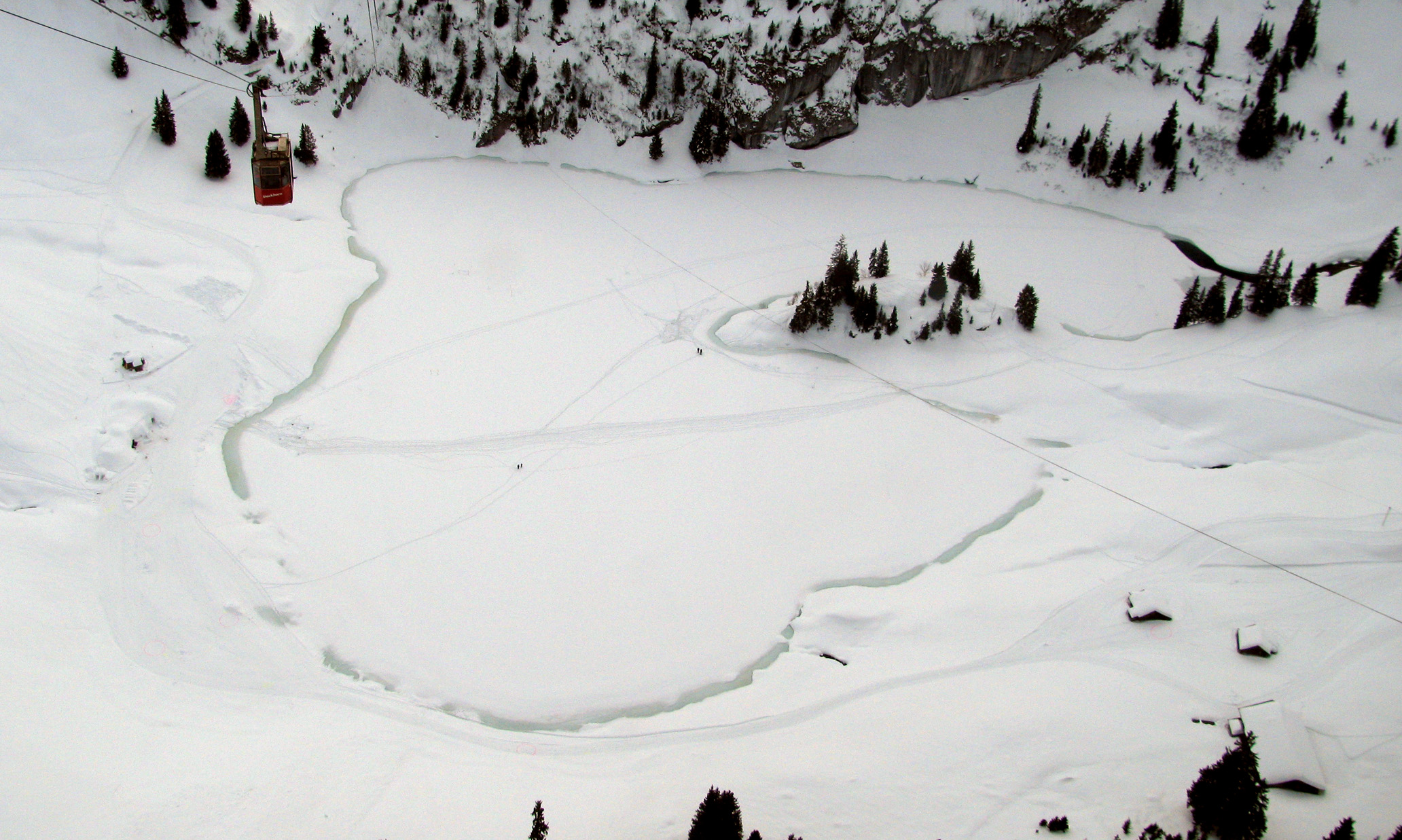
Hinterstockensee in winter

The Hinterstockensee is a lake below the Stockhorn and near Oberstockensee (1665 m) in the Swiss municipality of Erlenbach im Simmental in the Canton of Bern.

The lake has a 100-metre-long (330 ft) island and is located at an elevation of 1595 meters. It lies in a rocky basin of a cirque on the south side of the Stockhorn and is embedded in the Couches-Rouges core (red marl slate of the upper Cretaceous) of the Hinterstockensee trough named after it. This syncline is located between the Schneeloch-Solhorn vault and the Walper-Schuppenzone and extends from the Hinterstockensee, Lasenberg, Nüschleten to Steinig Nacki. It is also called the "Flyschmulde" (after Roland Umiker) due to its flysch occurrence.

The diameter of Lake Hinterstocken is approximately 300 meters, and its area is 6 hectares. The lake's outflow is subterranean. The water flows under 40 meters of cliffs and emerges as a wild stream after about eight hours in the Klusi (1300 m). A nameless rocky peninsula (46.685061°N 7.539417°E) on the western shore of Lake Hinterstocken gives the lake a heart-shaped surface by forming two bays.

The lake can be reached by the Stockhornbahn cable car (Chrindi station). It is a popular destination for amateur fishermen. A hiking trail leads to the Oberstockensee (also called Vorderstockensee, 1665 m), 1.5 km to the west. The two lakes are connected by a tunnel. The small Klusi high-pressure storage power plant has been using the water from the lakes to generate energy since the 1940s; the plant was renovated in 1994/1995.

== See also ==
- List of mountain lakes of Switzerland
