= Länggrien =

Coordinates: 47°11′41″N 7°29′00″E

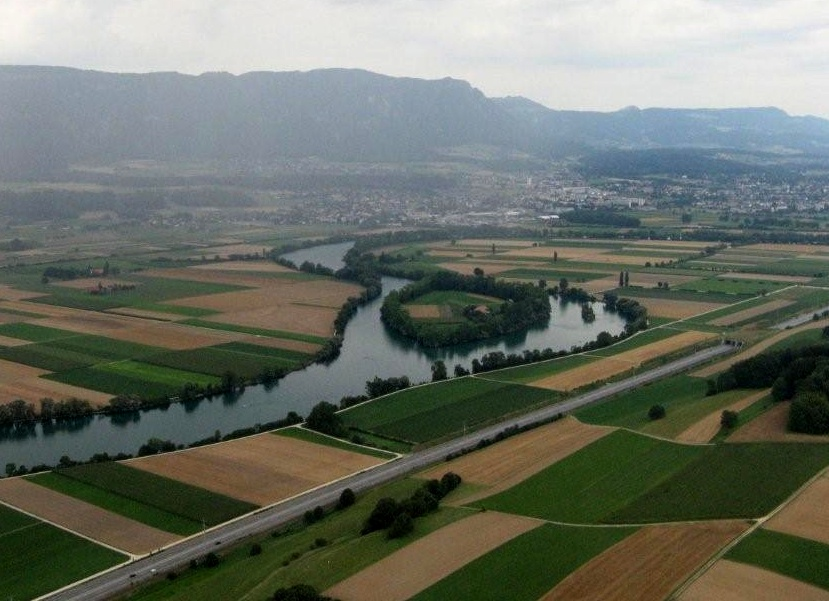
- View from the south side

Geography
- Location: River Aare
- Highest elevation: 428 m (1404 ft)

Administration
- Switzerland
- Canton: Solothurn
- District: Lebern

Länggrien (also known as Aareinseli) is an island in the River Aare, located in the canton of Solothurn, Switzerland. The island has a maximum length of 600 metres and a maximum width of 270 metres. Its highest point is 428 metres above sea level, a few metres above the river level. The minimum distance from the shore is about 50 metres.

Politically the island belongs to the municipality of Selzach in the district of Lebern.

== See also ==
- List of islands of Switzerland
