= Oberstockensee =

Lake in the canton of Bern, Switzerland, above Erlenbach im Simmental, below Stockhorn

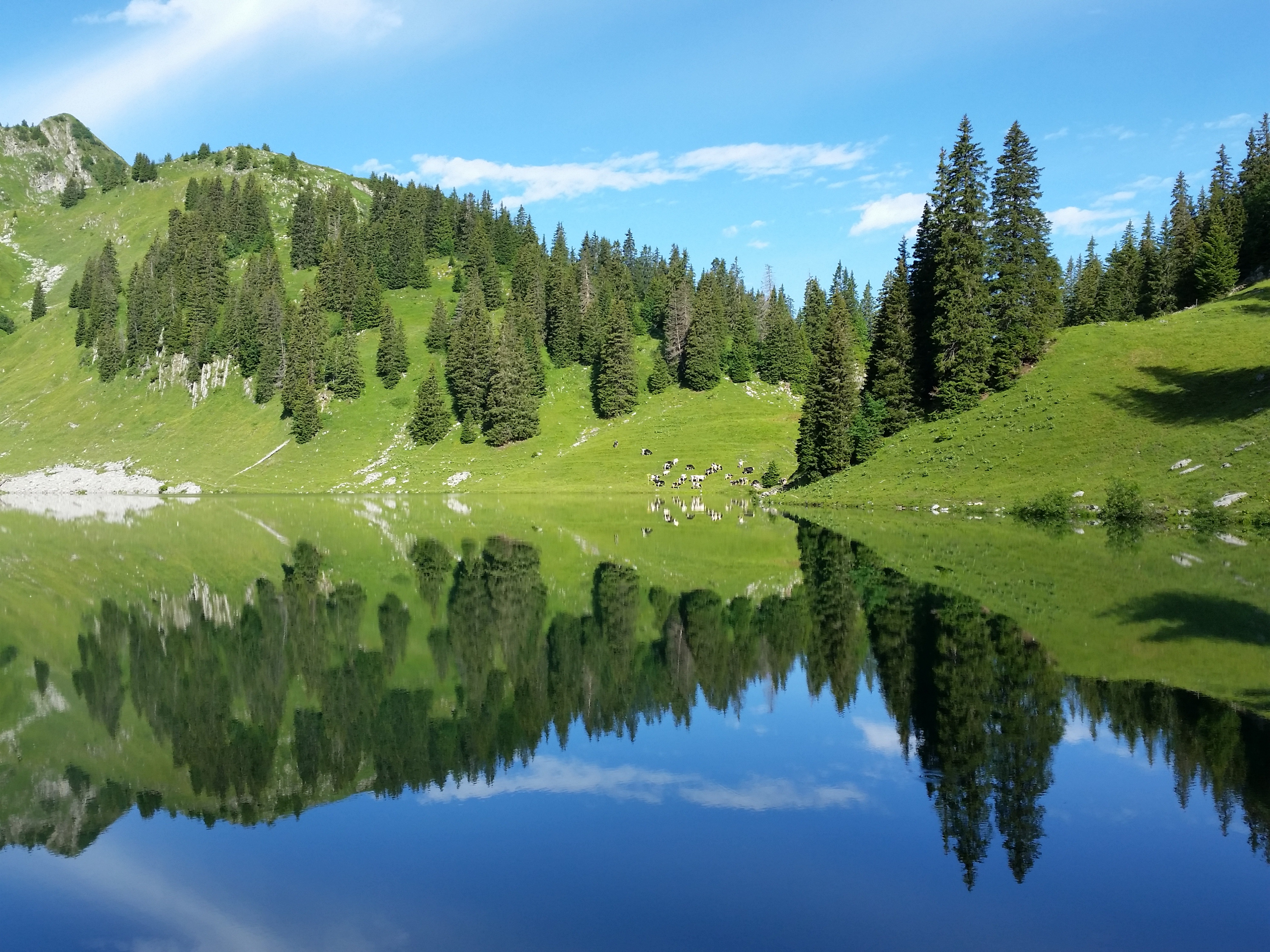
- Oberstockensee in July 2014

- Location within Canton of Bern Location within Switzerland Location within Alps
- Interactive map of Oberstockensee
- Location: Canton of Bern
- Coordinates: 46°41′17″N 7°31′17″E
- Type: natural
- Basin countries: Switzerland
- Surface area: 11.8 ha (29 acres)
- Max. depth: 15.3 m (50 ft)
- Surface elevation: 1,665 m (5,463 ft)

Oberstockensee is a small lake in the Canton of Bern, Switzerland. Its surface area is 11.8 ha (29 acres). The lake is located above the village of Erlenbach im Simmental, below Stockhorn. During the 19th and 20th centuries, the "Oberstockensee" was often called the Vorderstockensee and/or Spetbaerglisee. Local residents still refer to it as the "Spetbaerglisee." Vorderstocken and Spetbaergli are the two alpine meadows that are on opposite sides of the lake.

== See also ==
- List of mountain lakes of Switzerland
