= Faulhorn =

Mountain of the Bernese Alps

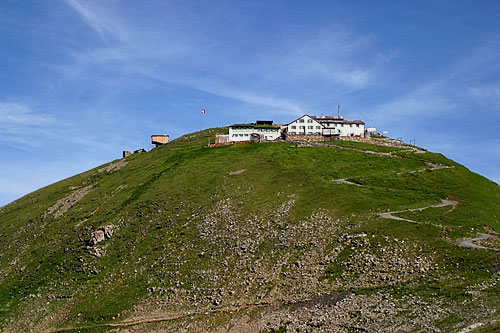
- The summit with the hotel

Highest point
- Elevation: 2,681 m (8,796 ft)
- Prominence: 128 m (420 ft)
- Parent peak: Reeti
- Coordinates: 46°40′29.6″N 7°59′58.8″E

Geography
- Location within Switzerland
- Location: Bern, Switzerland
- Parent range: Bernese Alps

The Faulhorn is a mountain of the Bernese Alps, located between Lake Brienz and Grindelwald in the Bernese Oberland. The summit is 2,681 metres (8,796 ft) high and can be reached by several trails.

The mountain is split between the municipalities of Iseltwald and Grindelwald, with the summit located on the boundary between the two.

The hotel situated on the summit of Faulhorn was built in 1830. It has undergone very little change since then.

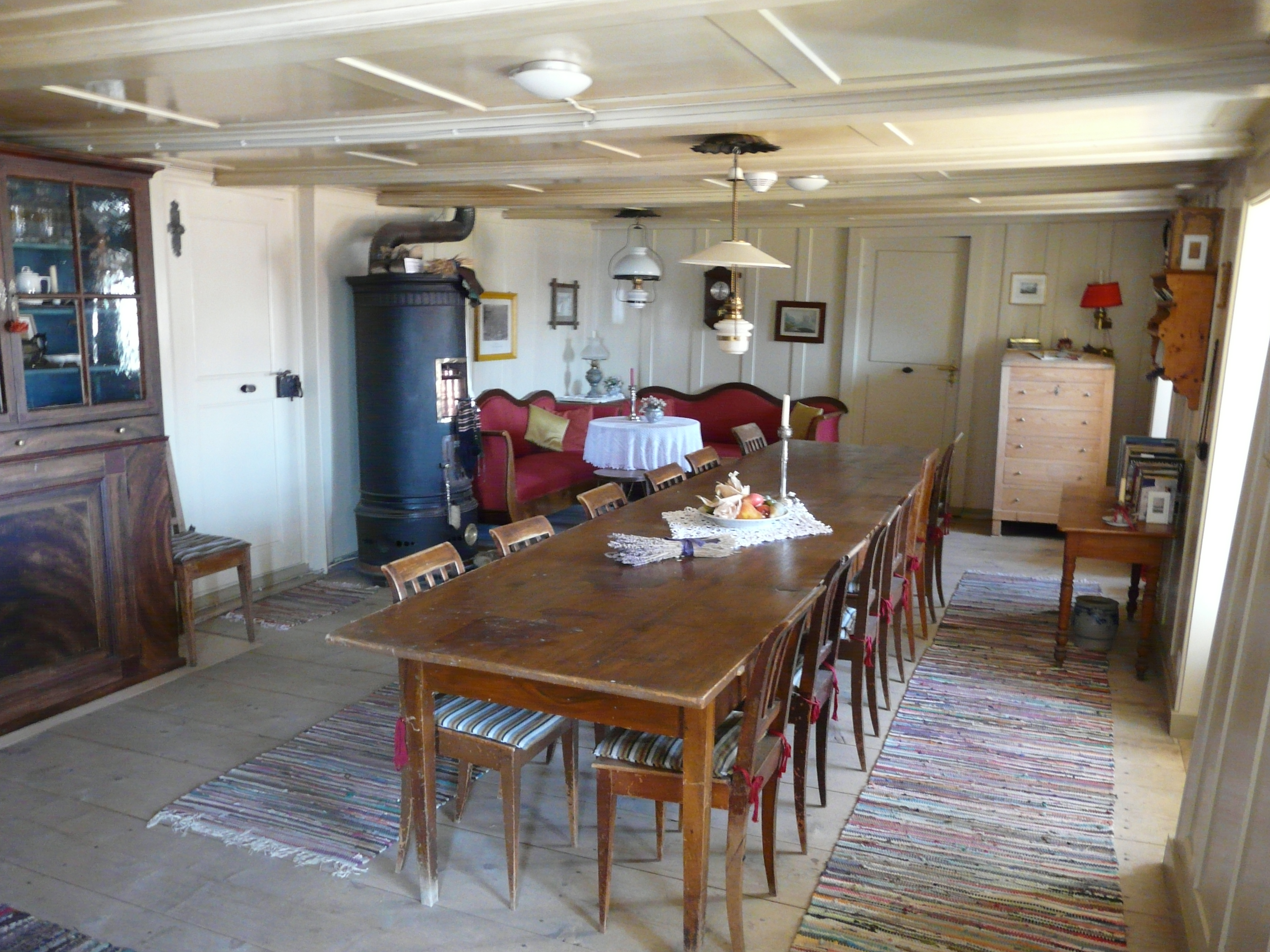
The old dining hall of the Faulhorn hotel

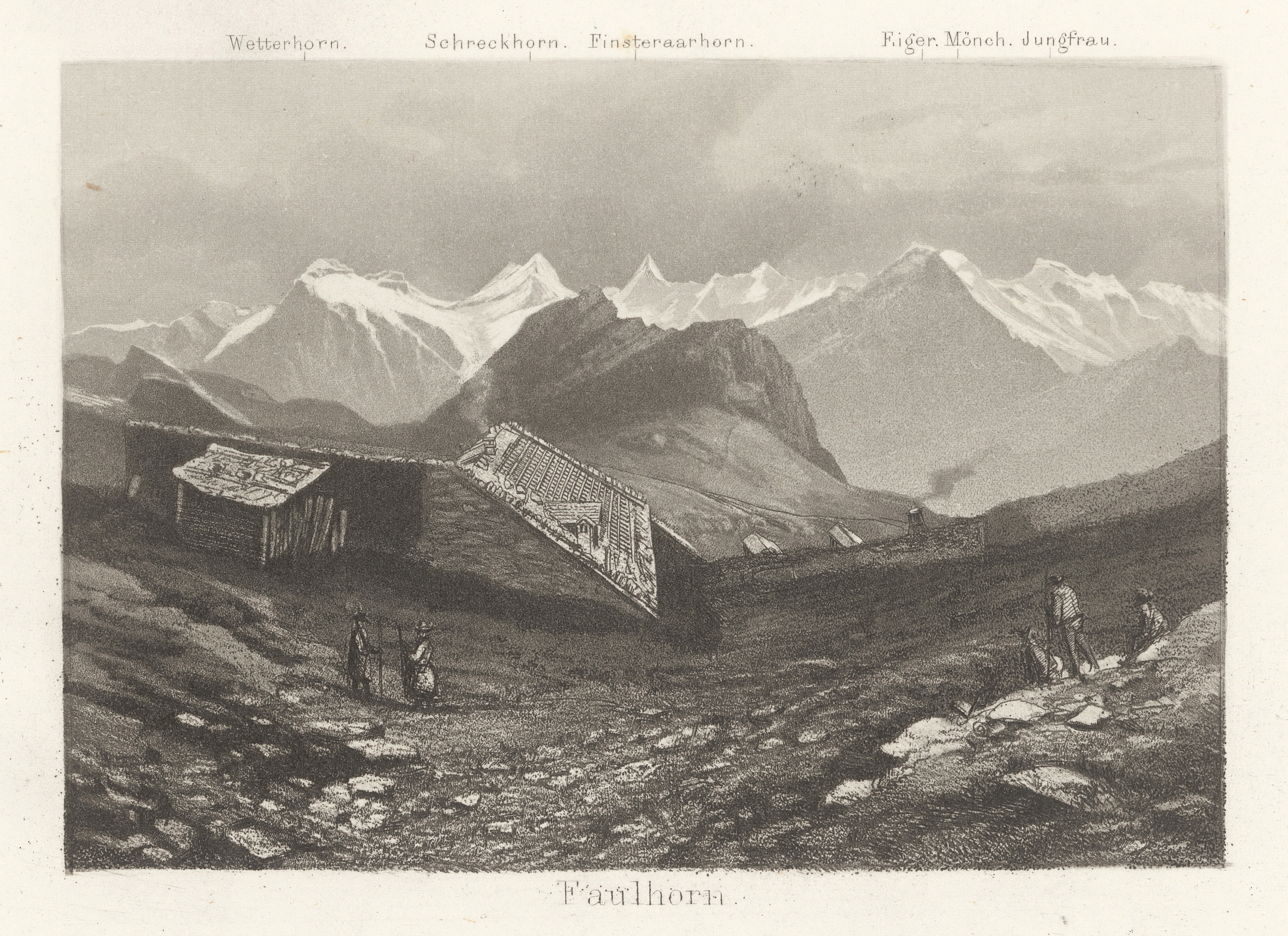
1870s panoramic view from Faulhorn.
Etching by Heinrich Müller
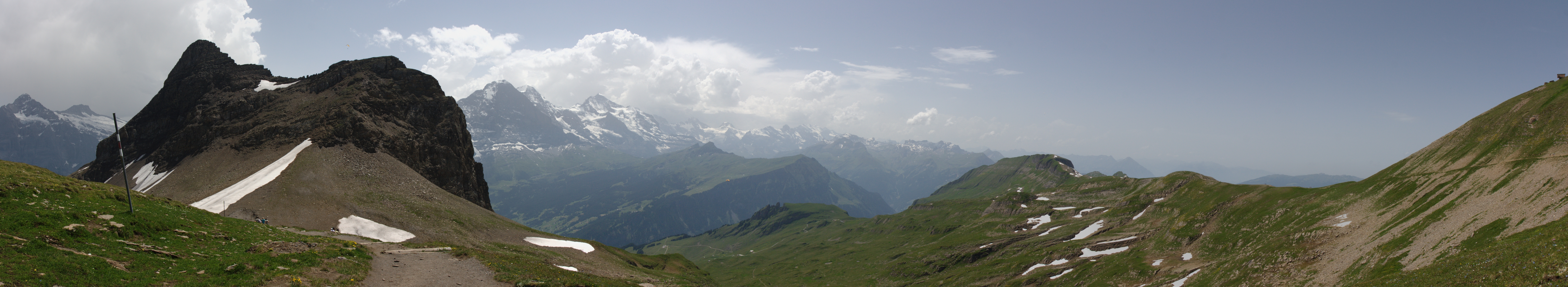
Panoramic view from Faulhorn
