= Île Rousseau =

Island in Geneva, Switzerland

Coordinates: 46°12′22″N 6°08′51″E

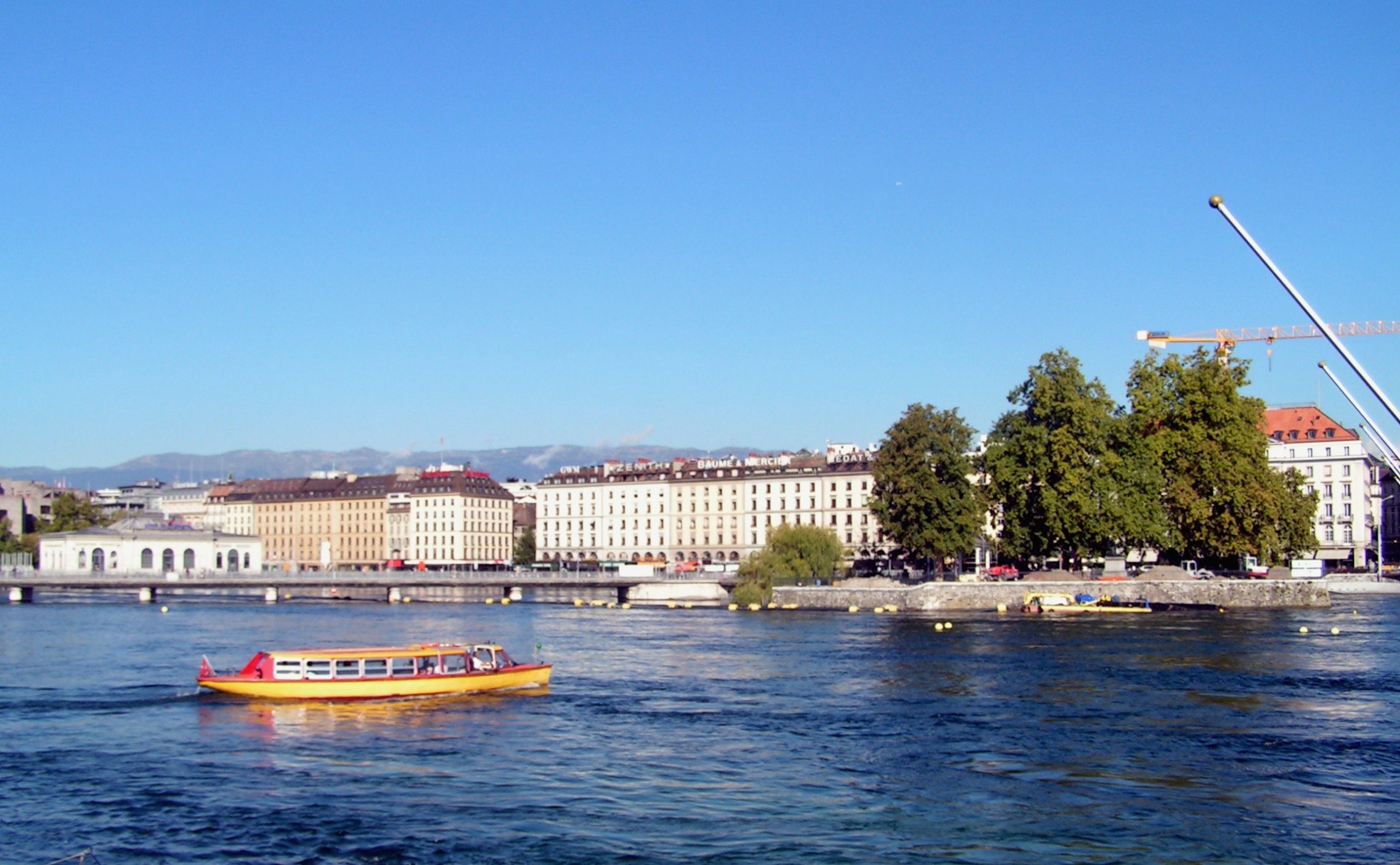

- Location within Switzerland

Geography
- Location: River Rhone

Administration
- Switzerland
- Canton: Geneva

The Île Rousseau (French pronunciation: [il ʁuso]) is an island and park in Geneva, situated in the middle of the Rhone. It was named after the philosopher Jean-Jacques Rousseau. On the island is a statue of Rousseau.

The island is connected to the shore by a bridge.

== See also ==
- List of islands of Switzerland
