= The Ice-Maiden =

Fairy tale by Hans Christian Andersen

- Short story by Hans Christian Andersen
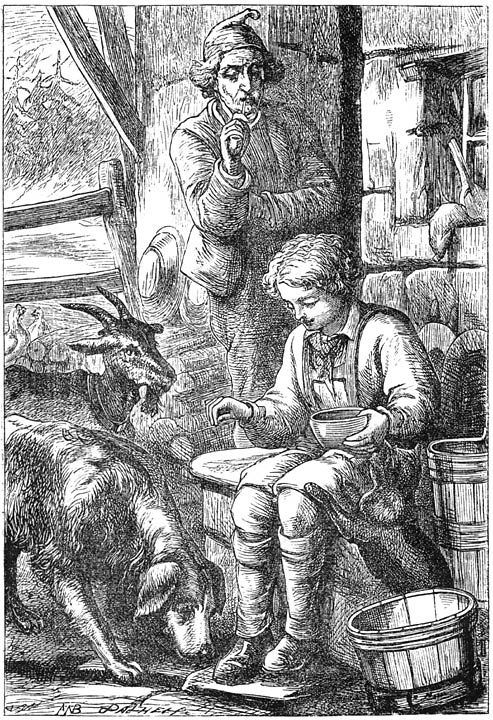
- Rudy and his grand-father
- Original title: "Iisjomfruen"
- Country: Denmark
- Language: Danish
- Genre(s): Literary fairy tale, short story

Publication
- Publication date: 25 November 1861
- Published in English: 1863

"The Ice-Maiden" (Danish: Iisjomfruen, or Isjomfruen in contemporary Danish) is an 1861 literary fairy tale by the Danish writer Hans Christian Andersen. The first English translation was published by King and Baird in 1863. The story, set in Switzerland, was inspired by a local legend about the Île de Peilz, a small island in Lake Geneva, which is also the setting of its denouement.

== Summary ==
In "The Ice-Maiden", written towards the end of his career, Hans Christian Andersen tells the tale of Rudy, a boy who lost both his parents and goes to live with his uncle. The reader is first introduced to Rudy as he sells toy houses made by his grandfather. Rudy grows up to become a skilled mountain climber and huntsman.

He has fallen in love with the miller's daughter, Babette; however, the miller does not approve of the union and gives Rudy the impossible task of climbing to the top of a dangerous mountain and bringing back a live baby eaglet. While Babette was off visiting her godmother, she caught the attention of her cousin and flirted with him, which reveals in Rudy a growing jealousy. When Rudy finds the cousin climbing up a tree into Babette's window, Babette is enraged that Rudy is yelling at her cousin and tells him to leave.

On his way home, Rudy comes across a beautiful maiden who has appeared in his life before. It's the Ice Maiden, who killed his mother and marked him as her own when he was a baby. He is angry at Babette and soon finds himself kissing the Ice Maiden. Rudy goes back to Babette and begs for her forgiveness. Their wedding day is near and they travel to the godmother's house to be wed at a church nearby.

The night after their arrival Babette has an awful dream that she cheats on Rudy with her cousin. One night before the wedding, Babette decides she wants to go to a small island with just enough room for the two of them to dance. As they sit and talk together, Babette notices the boat is slipping away. Rudy dives into the water after it but the Ice Maiden kisses him one last time and he drowns. Babette is left alone on the island crying over the death of her loved one, but nobody can hear her over the storm.

== Adaptations ==
The 38, 39 and 40th episodes of anime television series Andersen Monogatari (1971) are an adaptation of the story.

== See also ==
- The Snow Queen
