= Mauensee =

Lake in Lucerne, Switzerland

- Mauesee
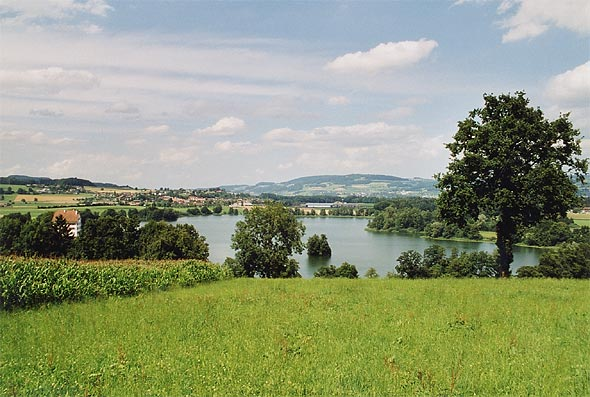

- Location within Canton of Lucerne Location within Switzerland Location within Alps
- Interactive map of Mauensee
- Location: Lucerne
- Coordinates: 47°10′20″N 8°04′30″E
- Primary outflows: Ron
- Basin countries: Switzerland
- Surface area: 55 ha (140 acres)
- Max. depth: 9 m (30 ft)
- Surface elevation: 504 m (1,654 ft)
- Islands: 4 islets
- Settlements: Mauensee

Mauesee (or Germanized Mauensee, Lake of Mauen) is a lake in the canton of Lucerne, Switzerland, near the town Mauensee. Mauensee Castle is built on an islet in the 0.55 km^{2} (136 acre) large lake. It was built in 1605 for the Pfyffer family.

== See also ==
- List of lakes of Switzerland
