= Lake Brienz =

Lake in the canton of Berne in Switzerland

- Brienzersee (German)
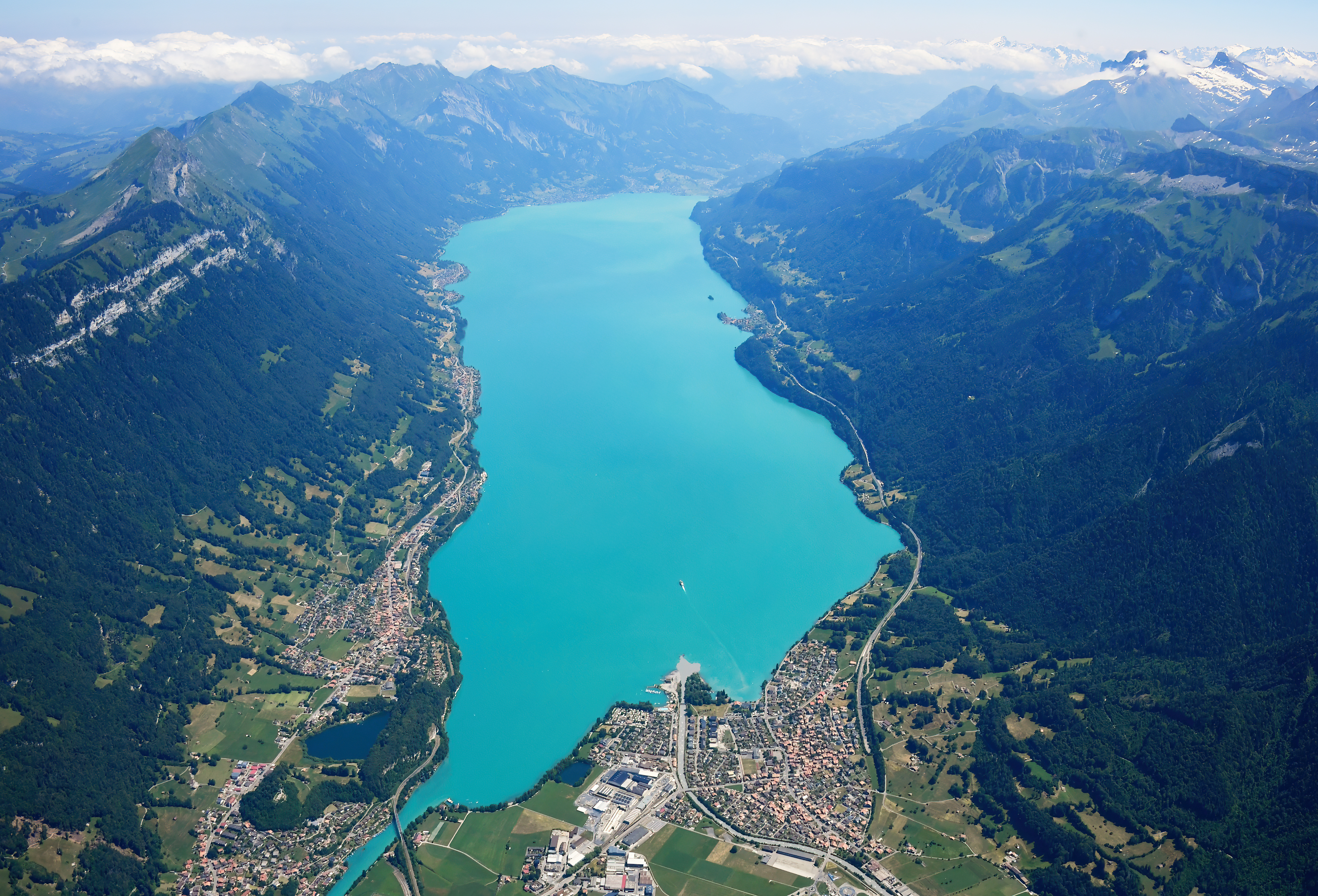
- Aerial view of Lake Brienz from the southwest

- Location within Canton of Bern Location within Switzerland Location within Alps
- Interactive map of Lake Brienz
- Location: Bernese Highlands, canton of Bern
- Coordinates: 46°43′N 7°58′E
- Primary inflows: Aare, Lütschine, Giessbach
- Primary outflows: Aare
- Catchment area: 1,127 km^{2} (435 sq mi)
- Basin countries: Switzerland
- Max. length: 14 km (8.7 mi)
- Max. width: 2.8 km (1.7 mi)
- Surface area: 29.8 km^{2} (11.5 sq mi)
- Average depth: 173 m (568 ft)
- Max. depth: 260 m (850 ft)
- Water volume: 5.17 km^{3} (4,190,000 acre⋅ft)
- Residence time: 2.69 years
- Surface elevation: 564 m (1,850 ft)
- Islands: Schnäggeninseli (islet)
- Settlements: Bönigen, Brienz, Iseltwald, Niederried, Oberried, Ringgenberg

Lake Brienz (German: Brienzersee, Swiss Standard German pronunciation: [ˈbriːntsərˌzeː]) is a lake just north of the Alps, in the canton of Bern in Switzerland. It has a length of about 14 kilometres (8.7 mi), a width of 2.8 kilometres (1.7 mi) and a maximum depth of 260 metres (850 ft). Its area is 29.8 square kilometres (11.5 sq mi); the surface is 564 metres (1,850 ft) above the sea-level. It is fed, among others, by the upper reaches of the Aare at its eastern end, the Giessbach at its southern shore from steep, forested and rocky hills of the high Faulhorn and Schwarzhoren more than 2,000 metres (6,600 ft) above the lake, as well as by both headwaters of the Lütschine, the Schwarze Lütschine (Black Lütschine) flowing from Grindelwald, and the Weisse Lütschine (White Lütschine) from the Lauterbrunnen Valley, at its southwestern corner. Not far north from Lütschine's inflow, the lake drains into a further stretch of the Aare at its western end. The culminating point of the lake's drainage basin is the Finsteraarhorn at 4,274 metres above sea level.

The village of Brienz, from which the lake takes its name, lies on the northern shore to its eastern end. In the west, the lake is terminated by the Bödeli, a tongue of land that separates it from neighbouring Lake Thun. The village of Bönigen occupies the lake frontage of the Bödeli, whilst the larger resort town of Interlaken lies on the reach of the Aare between the two lakes. The village of Iseltwald lies on the south shore, whilst the villages of Ringgenberg, Niederried and Oberried are on the north shore.

The lake is poor in nutrients, and thus fishing is not very important. Nevertheless, in 2001 10,000 kg of fish were caught.

There have been passenger ships on the lake since 1839, and currently there are five passenger ships on the lake. The ships are operated by BLS AG, the local railway company, and link Interlaken Ost railway station, which they access using a 1.3-kilometre (0.81 mi) long navigable stretch of the Aare, with Brienz and other lakeside settlements. The ships also connect to the Giessbachbahn, a funicular which climbs up to the Giessbach Falls.

The Brünig railway line follows the northern shore of the lake, along with a local road, whilst the A8 motorway adopts an alternative and mostly tunnelled route above the southern shore.

Lake Brienz (right) and Lake Thun on the Swiss National Map (1:25'000)
