= Bachalpsee =

Lake in Bernese Highlands, Switzerland

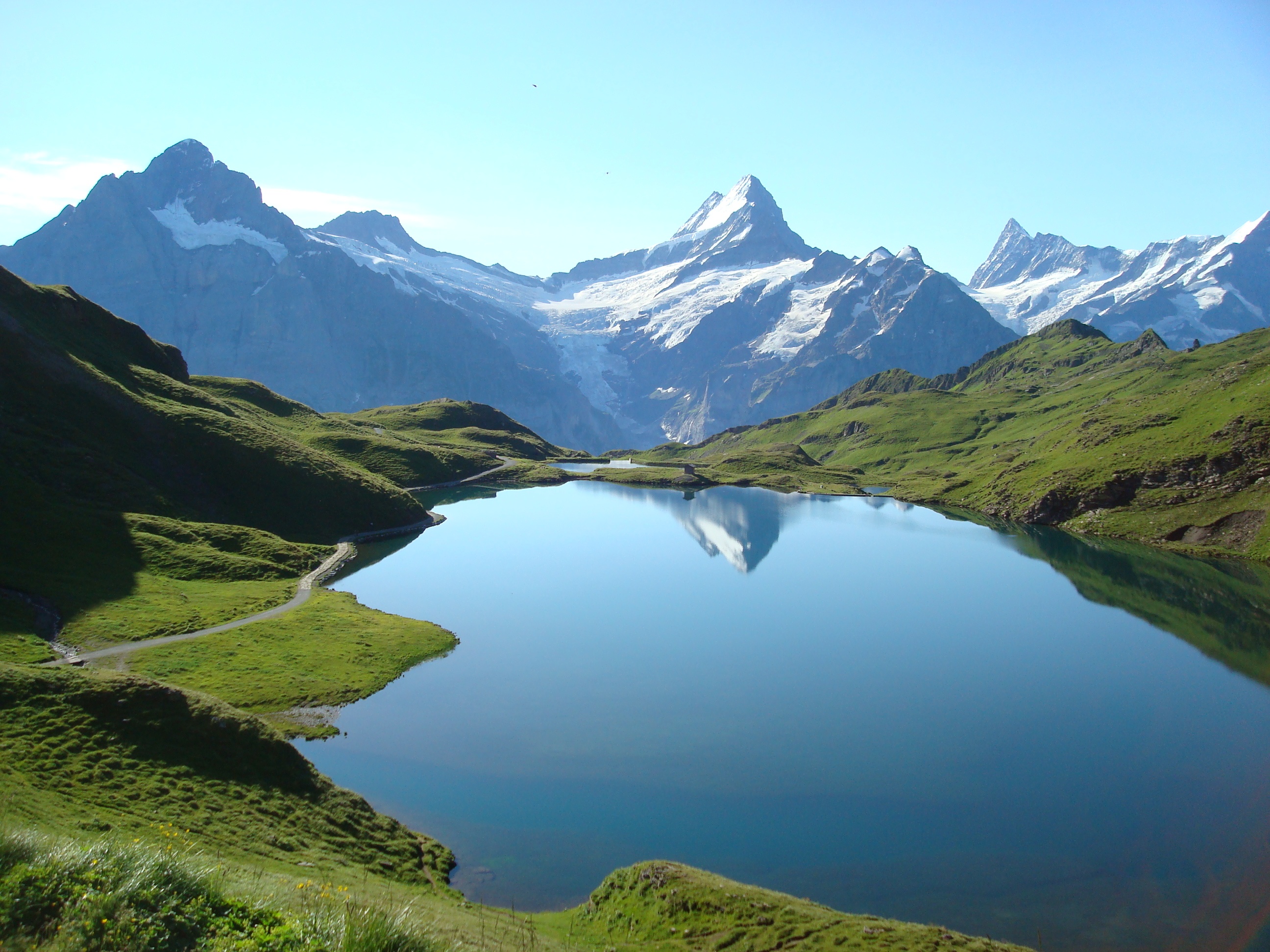

- Location within Canton of Bern Location within Switzerland Location within Alps
- Interactive map of Bachalpsee
- Location: Bernese Oberland
- Coordinates: 46°40′10″N 8°1′24″E
- Primary outflows: Milibach
- Basin countries: Switzerland
- Surface area: 0.0806 km^{2} (0.0311 sq mi)
- Max. depth: 14.8 m (49 ft)
- Surface elevation: 2,265 m (7,431 ft)

Bachalpsee or Bachsee is a lake with an area of 8.06 ha (19.9 acres) close to the First (which can be reached with a cable car) above Grindelwald in the Bernese Oberland, Switzerland. The lake, located at an elevation of 2,265 m (7,431 ft), is split by a natural dam, the smaller part of the lake being 6 m (20 ft) lower.

The lake is featured in Gmail as part of its mountain theme background (as of 2013).

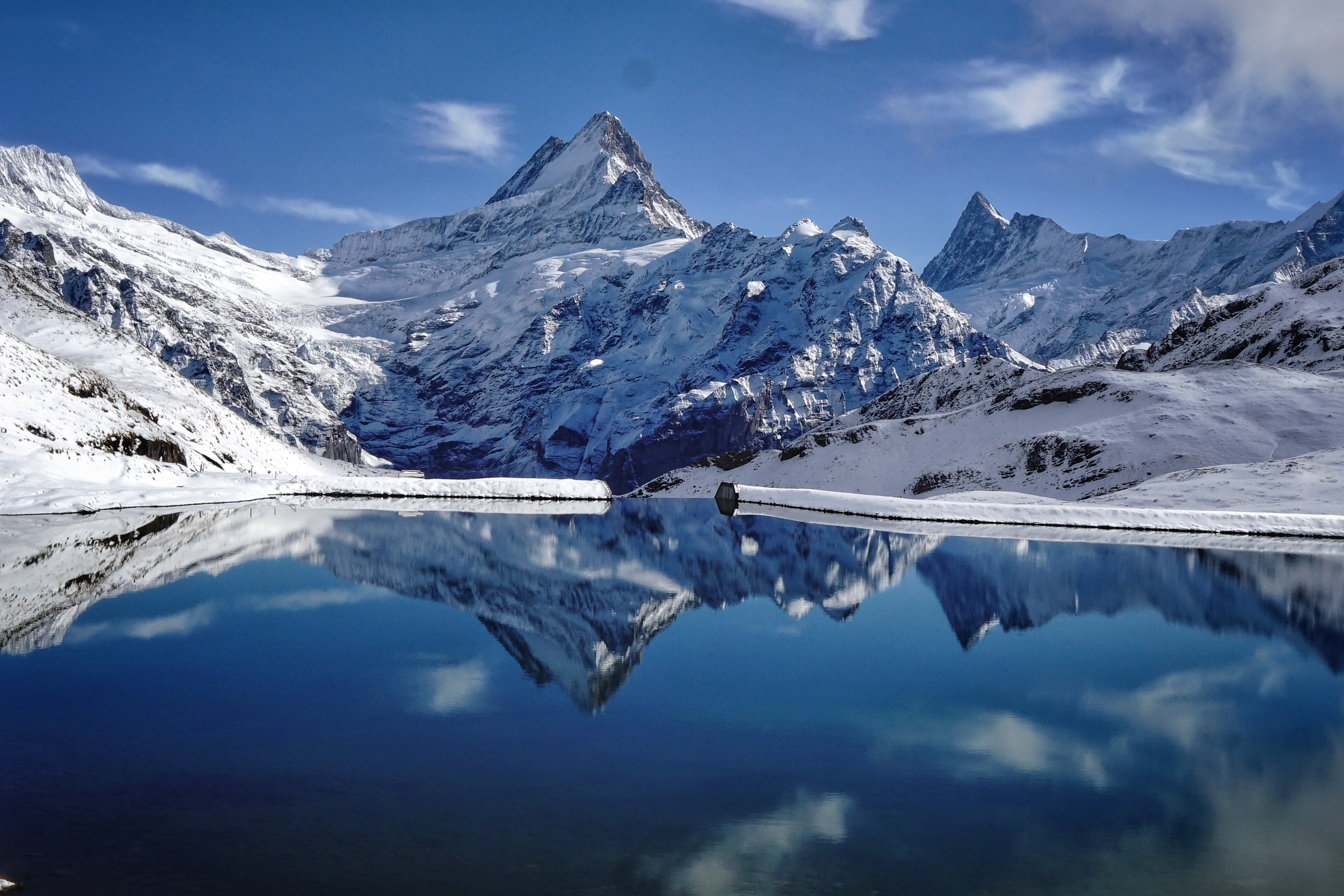
Lake Bachalpse with snow-covered mountains in the background.

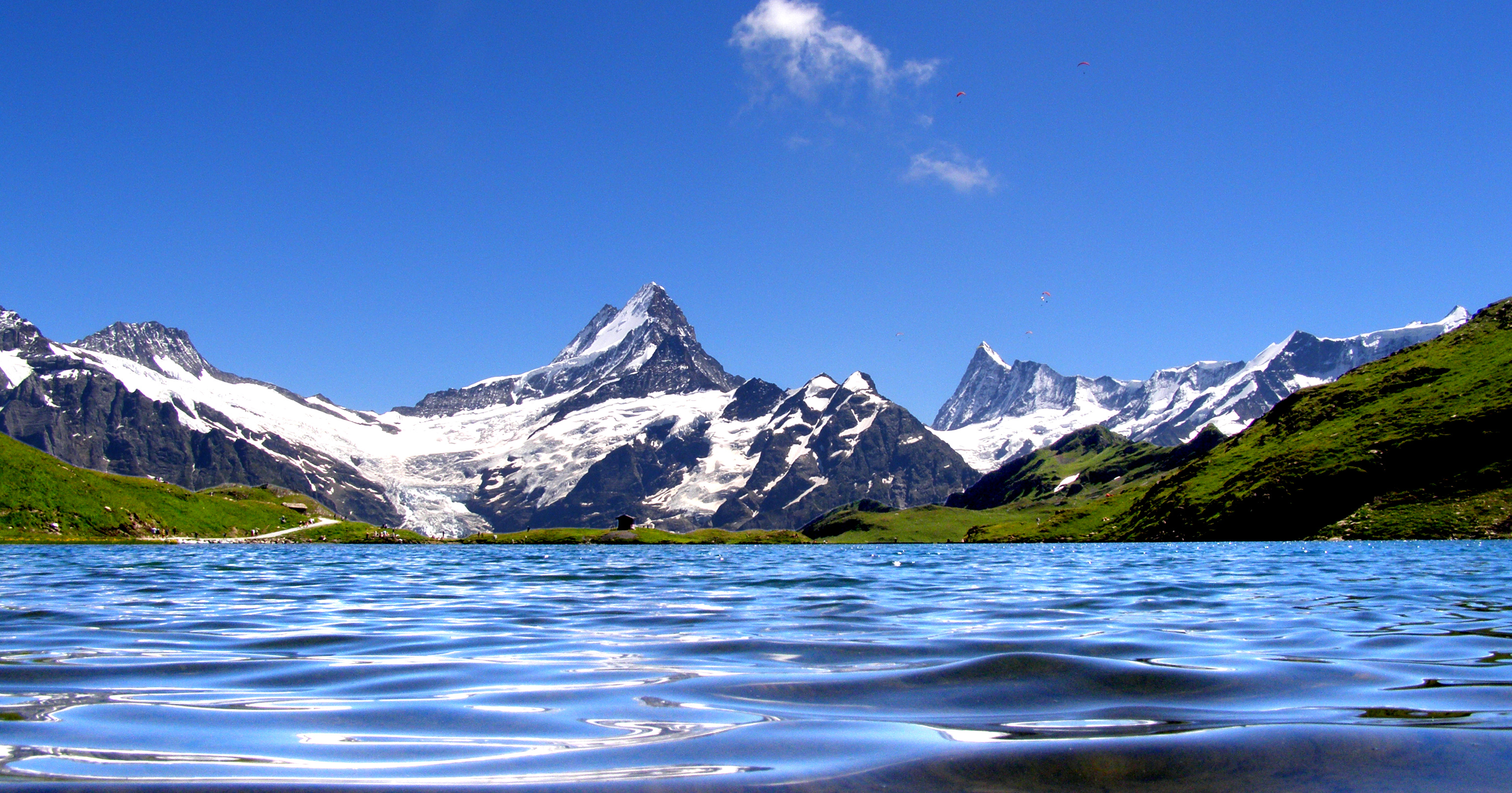
Bachalpsee and Schreckhorn

== See also ==
- List of mountain lakes of Switzerland
