= Mauensee, Lucerne =

Mauensee
- Municipality
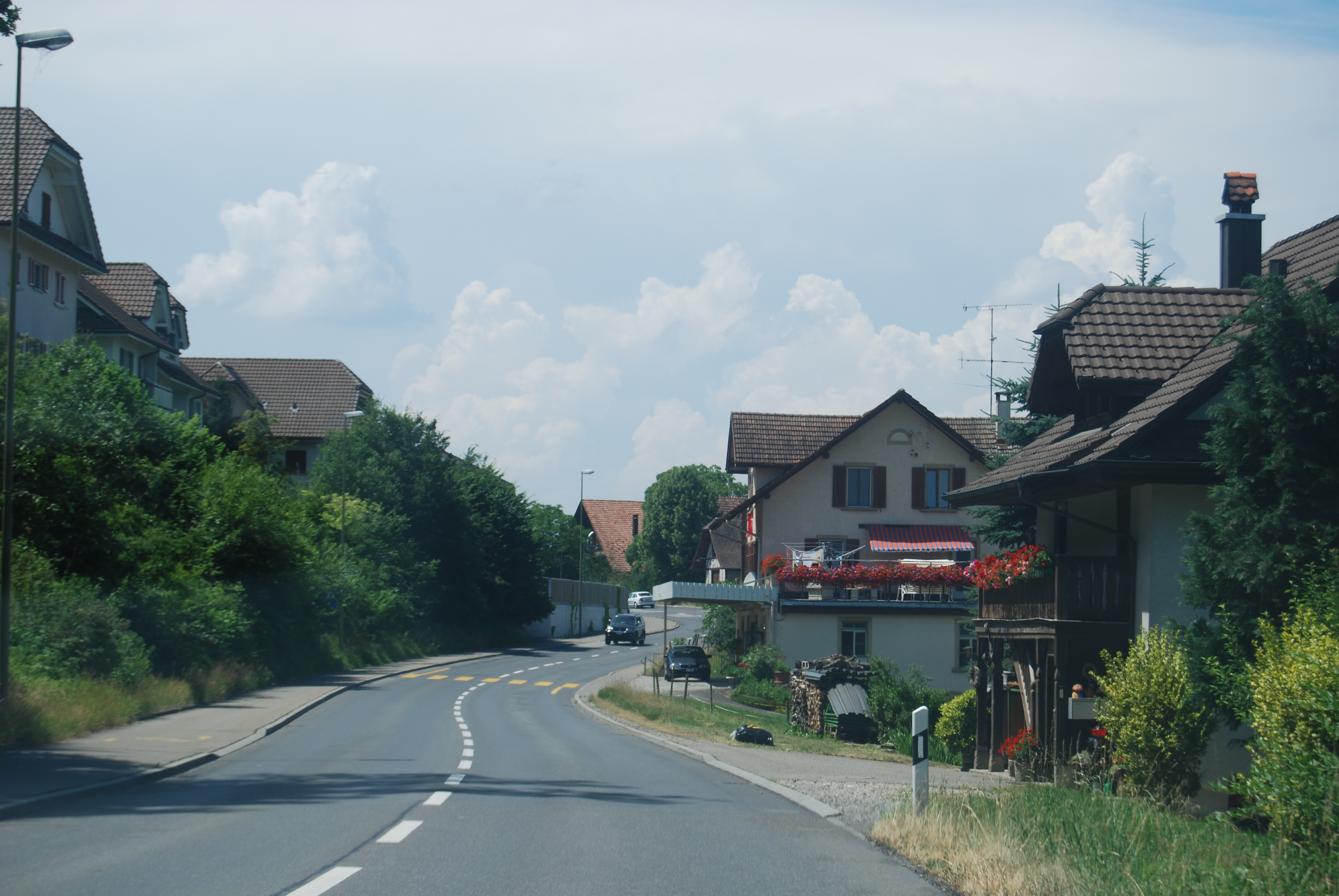

- Flag Coat of arms
- Location of Mauensee
- Location within Switzerland Location within Canton of Lucerne
- Coordinates: 47°10′N 8°4′E
- Country: Switzerland
- Canton: Lucerne
- District: Sursee

Area
  - Total: 7.17 km^{2} (2.77 sq mi)
- Elevation: 522 m (1,713 ft)

Population (December 2007)
  - Total: 1,126
  - Density: 157/km^{2} (407/sq mi)
- Time zone: UTC+01:00 (CET)
  - Summer (DST): UTC+02:00 (CEST)
- Postal code: 6216
- SFOS number: 1091
- ISO 3166 code: CH-LU
- Surrounded by: Dagmersellen, Ettiswil, Grosswangen, Knutwil, Oberkirch, Sursee, Wauwil
- Website: www.mauensee.ch

Mauensee is a municipality in the district of Sursee in the canton of Lucerne in Switzerland.

== History ==
Mauensee is first mentioned around 1190 as Moginse.

== Geography ==
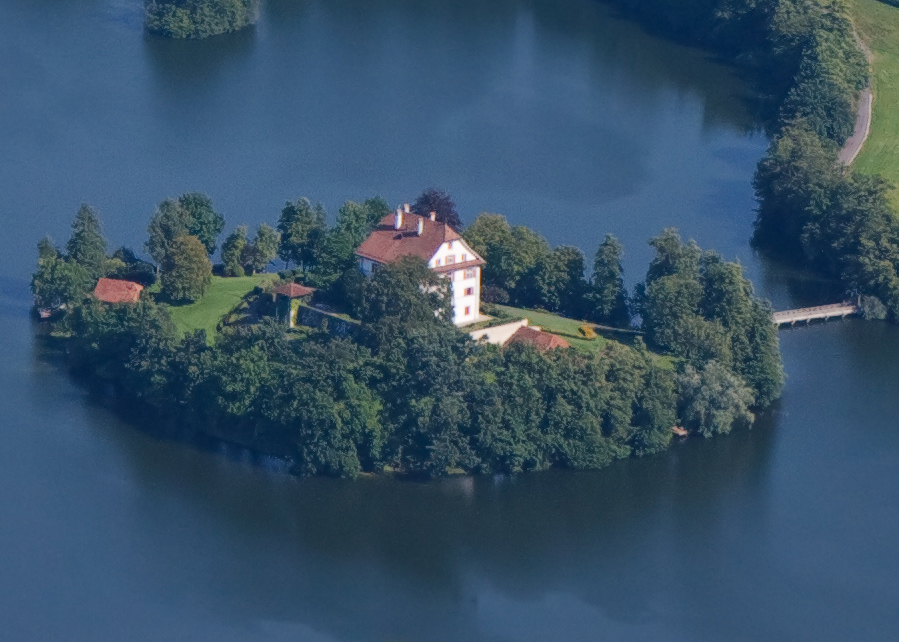
Aerial picture of Schloss Mauensee, located on an island in the lake

Aerial view (1953)

Mauensee has an area of 7.2 km^{2} (2.8 sq mi). Of this area, 68.5% is used for agricultural purposes, while 17.2% is forested. Of the rest of the land, 6.8% is settled (buildings or roads) and the remainder (7.5%) is non-productive (rivers, glaciers or mountains). In the 1997 land survey, 17.15% of the total land area was forested. Of the agricultural land, 64.85% is used for farming or pastures, while 3.63% is used for orchards or vine crops. Of the settled areas, 3.07% is covered with buildings, 0.56% is industrial, 0.28% is classed as special developments, 0.14% is parks or greenbelts and 2.79% is transportation infrastructure. Of the unproductive areas, 6.69% is unproductive standing water (ponds or lakes), 0.14% is unproductive flowing water (rivers) and 0.7% is other unproductive land.

The municipality is located along Lake Mauensee. It consists of the village of Mauensee and the hamlets of Bognau and Kaltbach as well as houses along the lake.

== Demographics ==
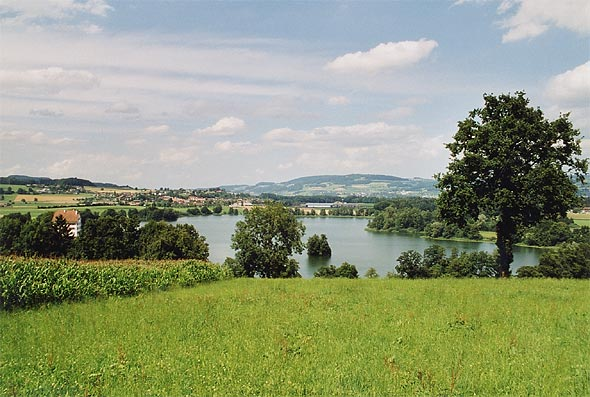
Lake Mauensee

Mauensee has a population (as of 2007) of 1,126, of which 7.5% are foreign nationals. Over the last 10 years the population has grown at a rate of 20.2%. Most of the population (as of 2000) speaks German (96.1%), with Albanian being second most common ( 1.0%) and Serbo-Croatian being third ( 1.0%).

In the 2007 election the most popular party was the CVP which received 28.4% of the vote. The next three most popular parties were the FDP (26.1%), the SVP (22.2%) and the Green Party (11%).

The age distribution in Mauensee is; 316 people or 27.6% of the population is 0–19 years old. 301 people or 26.3% are 20–39 years old, and 424 people or 37.1% are 40–64 years old. The senior population distribution is 79 people or 6.9% are 65–79 years old, 22 or 1.9% are 80–89 years old and 2 people or 0.2% of the population are 90+ years old.

The entire Swiss population is generally well educated. In Mauensee about 78.5% of the population (between age 25–64) have completed either non-mandatory upper secondary education or additional higher education (either university or a Fachhochschule).

As of 2000 there are 325 households, of which 69 households (or about 21.2%) contain only a single individual. 59 or about 18.2% are large households, with at least five members. As of 2000 there were 235 inhabited buildings in the municipality, of which 182 were built only as housing, and 53 were mixed use buildings. There were 142 single family homes, 26 double family homes, and 14 multi-family homes in the municipality. Most homes were either two (110) or three (56) story structures. There were only 5 single story buildings and 11 four or more story buildings.

Mauensee has an unemployment rate of 0.61%. As of 2005, there were 82 people employed in the primary economic sector and about 30 businesses involved in this sector. 69 people are employed in the secondary sector and there are 6 businesses in this sector. 78 people are employed in the tertiary sector, with 20 businesses in this sector. As of 2000 55.3% of the population of the municipality were employed in some capacity. At the same time, females made up 41.7% of the workforce.

In the 2000 census the religious membership of Mauensee was; 796 (83.1%) were Roman Catholic, and 95 (9.9%) were Protestant, with an additional 6 (0.63%) that were of some other Christian faith. There are 5 individuals (0.52% of the population) who are Muslim. Of the rest; there were 3 (0.31%) individuals who belong to another religion, 44 (4.59%) who do not belong to any organized religion, 9 (0.94%) who did not answer the question.

The historical population is given in the following table:

| year | population |
|---|---|
| 1850 | 632 |
| 1900 | 608 |
| 1950 | 637 |
| 2000 | 958 |
