= Iseltwald =

- Municipality
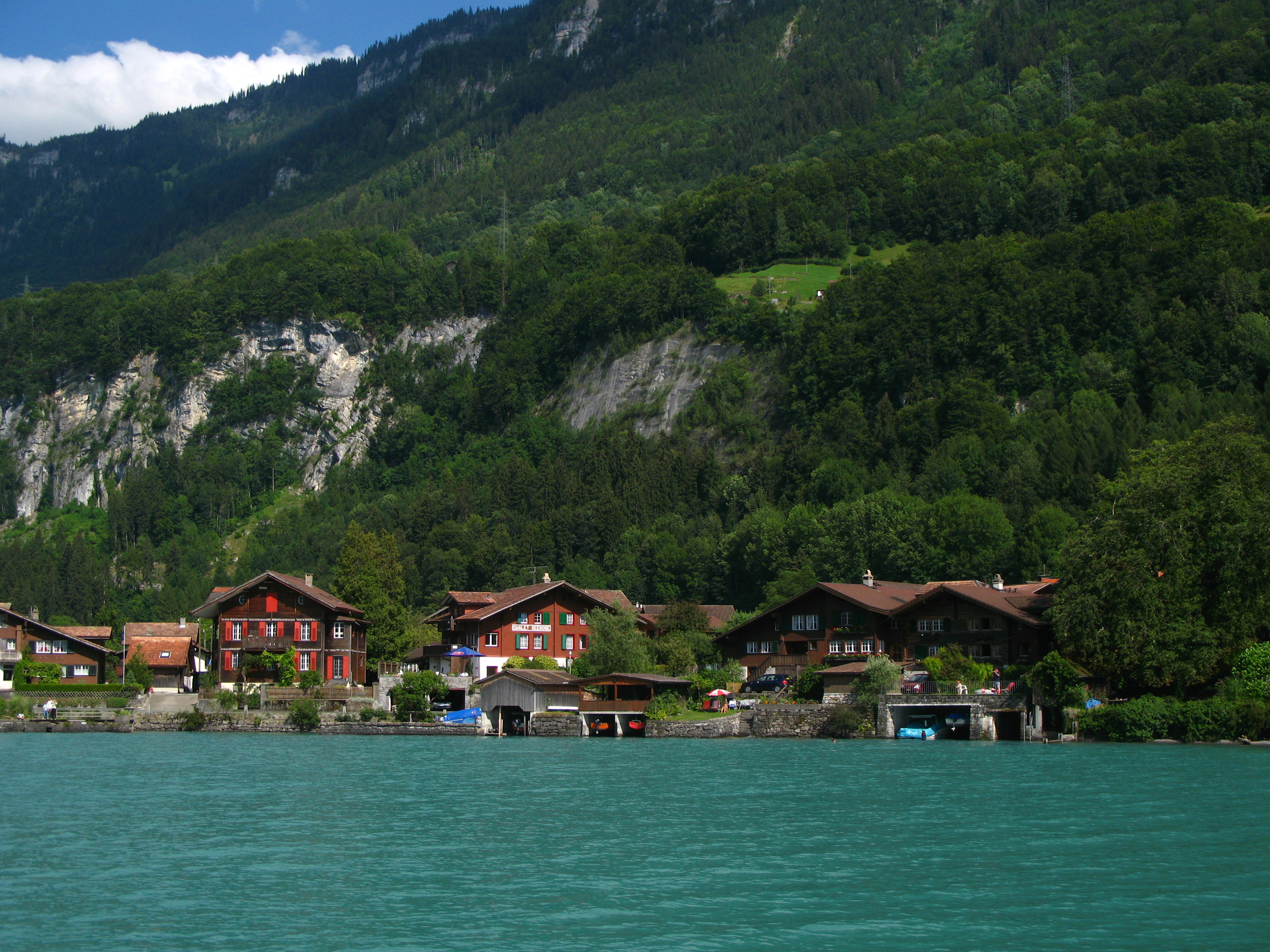

- Flag Coat of arms
- Location of Iseltwald
- Location within Switzerland Location within Canton of Bern
- Coordinates: 46°42′N 7°58′E
- Country: Switzerland
- Canton: Bern
- District: Interlaken-Oberhasli

Government
  - Executive: Gemeinderat with 7 members
  - Mayor: Gemeindepräsident(in); Gregor Wyss (as of 2026)

Area
  - Total: 21.9 km^{2} (8.5 sq mi)
- Elevation: 566 m (1,857 ft)

Population (December 2020)
  - Total: 415
  - Density: 18.9/km^{2} (49.1/sq mi)
- Time zone: UTC+01:00 (CET)
  - Summer (DST): UTC+02:00 (CEST)
- Postal code: 3807
- SFOS number: 582
- ISO 3166 code: CH-BE
- Surrounded by: Bönigen, Brienz, Grindelwald, Gündlischwand, Lütschental, Lake Thun
- Website: www.iseltwald.ch

Iseltwald is a village and municipality on the southern shore of Lake Brienz in the Bernese Oberland region of Switzerland. Politically, the municipality is located in the Interlaken-Oberhasli administrative district of the canton of Bern.

== History ==
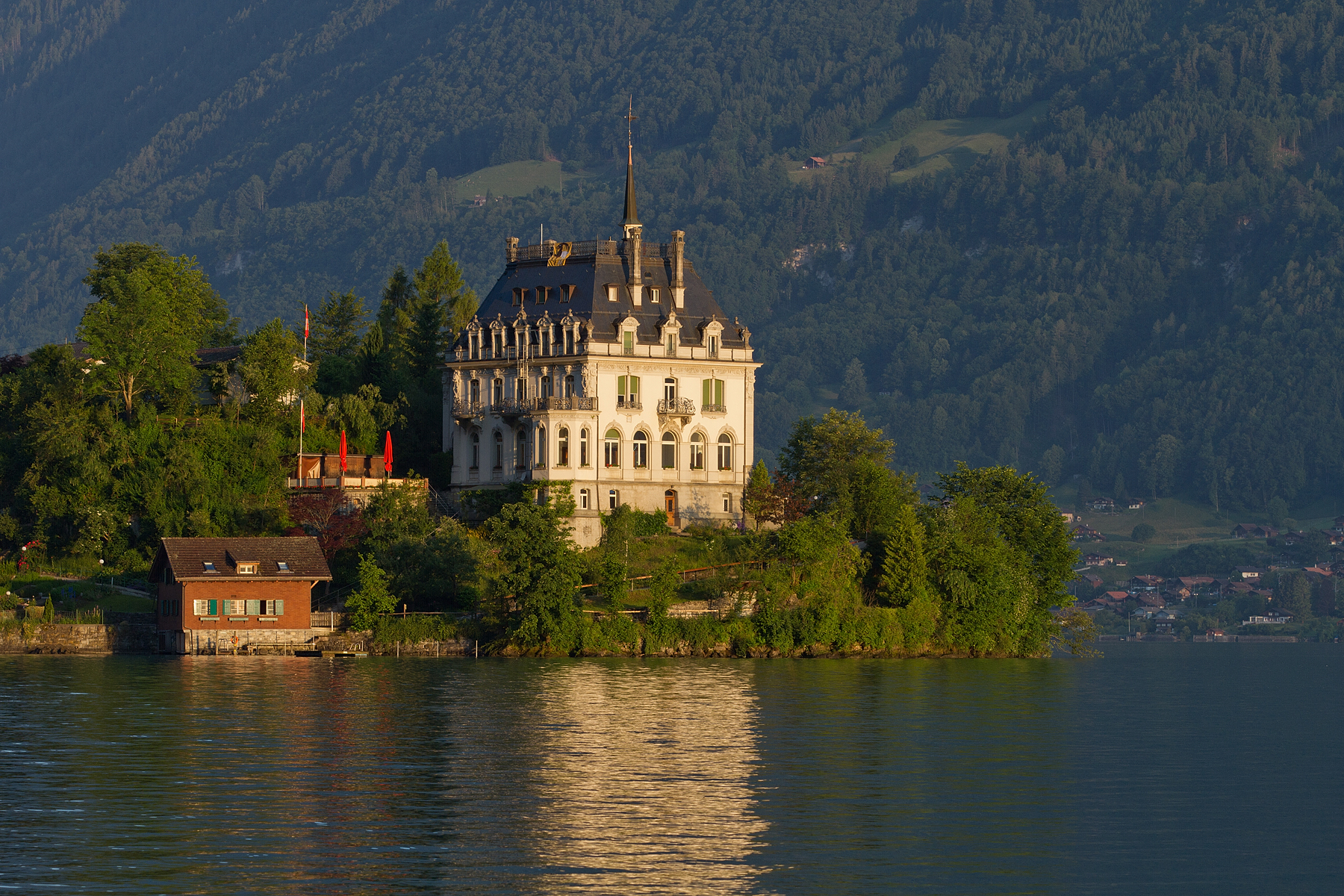
View of the peninsula and former castle (now Rehabilitation Center of Seeburg).

Iseltwald is first mentioned in 1146 as Iseltwalt.

During the Middle Ages, a castle was built on the peninsula near the village for the Lords of Matten. In 1146, King Conrad III gave Interlaken Monastery one quarter of the village. Over the following years, the monastery attempted to expand its power in the village. After the Swiss Confederation gained de facto independence from the House of Habsburg, the monastery remained a strong supporter of the Austrian dynasty. The monastery launched several raids into Unterwalden to support Habsburg ambitions. In response, in 1342, troops from Unterwalden attacked and burned Iseltwald. Several years later, in 1348-49, the village unsuccessfully rebelled against the monastery. In 1528, the city of Bern adopted the new faith of the Protestant Reformation and began imposing it on the Bernese Oberland. Iseltwald joined many other villages and the monastery in an unsuccessful rebellion against the new faith. After Bern imposed its will on the Oberland, it secularized the monastery and annexed all the monastery lands.

Since 1948, it has been part of the large parish of Gsteig bei Interlaken in Gsteigwiler.

The traditional local economy relied on fish from Lake Brienz, farming in the valleys, and seasonal alpine herding and farming in the alpine meadows. A glass-blowing factory opened between 1680 and 1696 and operated until 1715. Beginning in 1871, tourists began coming across the lake on steamships. However, there was only one large road into the village until 1988. Today, the local economy is based on tourism, agriculture, fishing, and timber harvesting.

== Geography ==
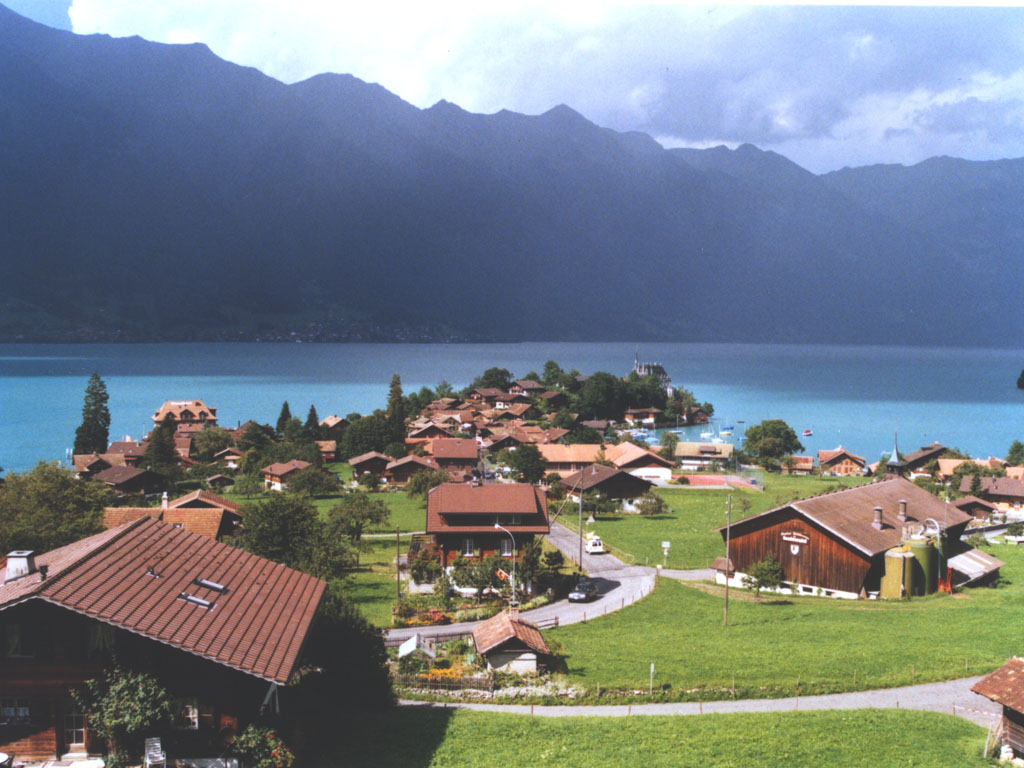
Iseltwalt on Lake Brienz

Aerial view by Walter Mittelholzer (1926)

The village of Iseltwalt is situated on a delta at the southern bank of Lake Brienz. It is 14 km (8.7 mi) from Interlaken, the road mostly running along Lake Brienz. Besides the village of Iseltwald, the municipality includes the hamlets of Furen, Sengg, and Isch, as well as many scattered farm houses.

The municipality's area also includes a large area of mountainside along the south shore of the lake, with the lower areas heavily wooded. These slopes extend up to the summit of the Faulhorn mountain, at an altitude of 2,680 m (8,790 ft).

Iseltwald has an area of 21.91 km^{2} (8.46 sq mi). Of this area, 6.85 km^{2} (2.64 mi^{2}) or 31.4% is used for agricultural purposes, while 10.44 km^{2} (4.03 mi^{2}) or 47.8% is forested. Of the rest of the land, 0.51 km^{2} (0.20 mi^{2}) or 2.3% is settled (buildings or roads), 0.08 km^{2} (20 acres) or 0.4% is either rivers or lakes and 3.97 km^{2} (1.53 mi^{2}) or 18.2% is unproductive land.

Of the built-up area, housing and buildings made up 1.0% and transportation infrastructure made up 1.1%. Out of the forested land, 42.5% of the total land area is heavily forested, and 3.2% is covered with orchards or small clusters of trees. Of the agricultural land, 4.6% is pastures and 26.7% is used for alpine pastures. All the water in the municipality is flowing water. Of the unproductive areas, 7.9% is unproductive vegetation, and 10.3% is too rocky for vegetation.

On 31 December 2009, Amtsbezirk Interlaken, the municipality's former district, was dissolved. On the following day, 1 January 2010, it joined the newly created Verwaltungskreis Interlaken-Oberhasli.

== Coat of arms ==
The blazon of the municipal coat of arms is Or an Ibex passant per pale Sable and Argent.

== Demographics ==
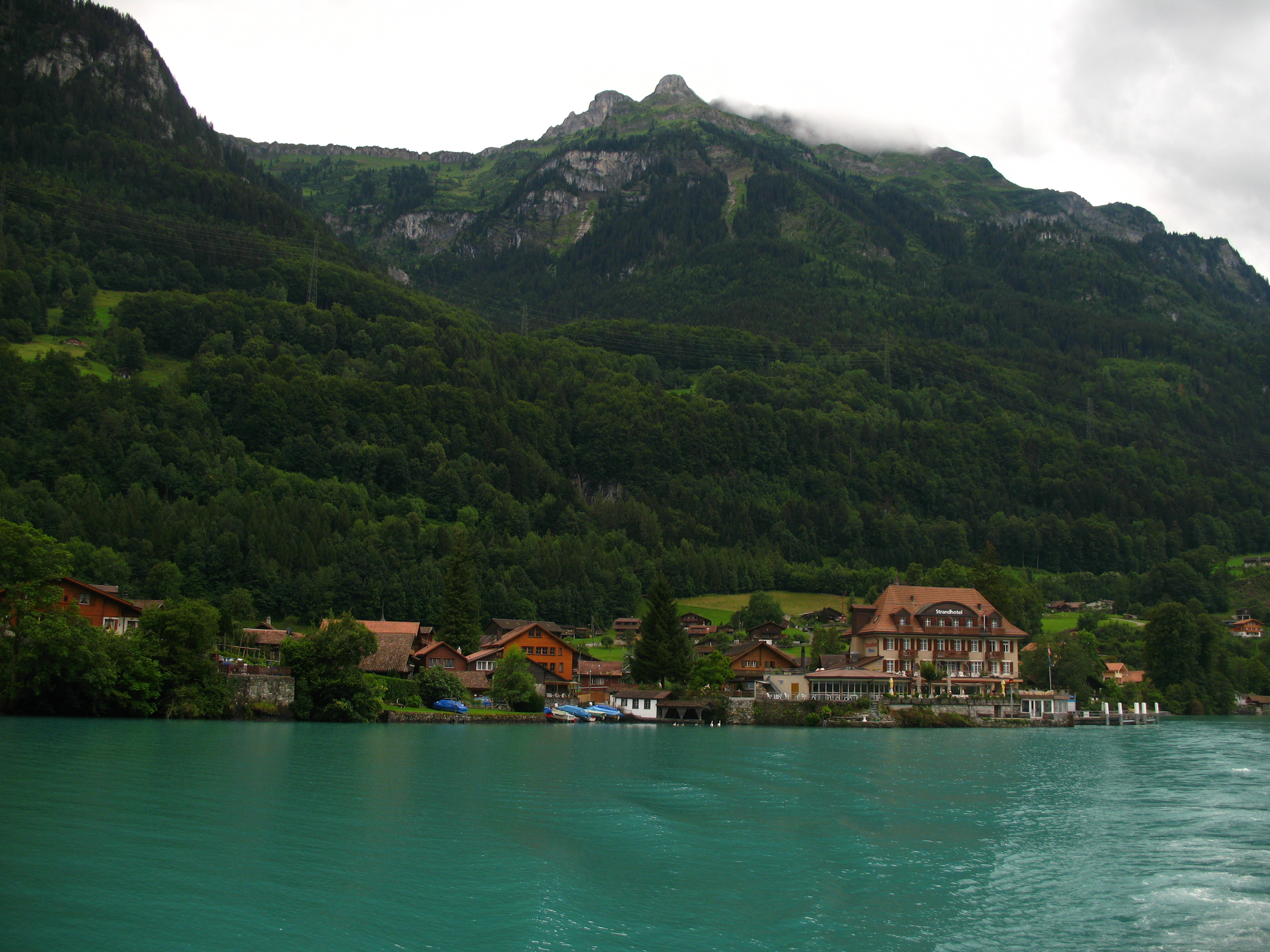
Lakefront of Iseltwald

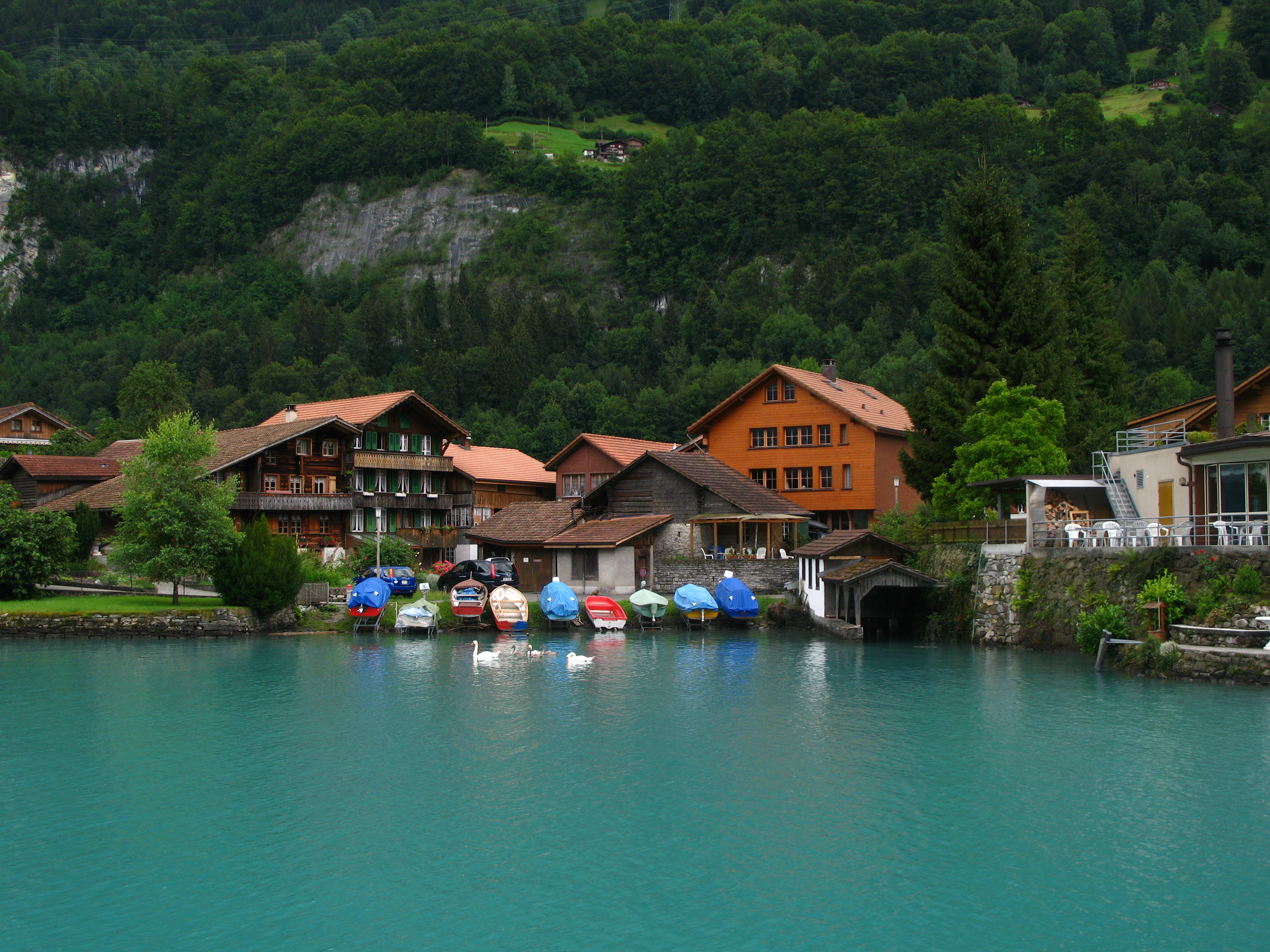
Houses along the lakefront

Iseltwald has a population (as of December 2020) of 415. As of 2010, 10.1% of the population are resident foreign nationals. Over the last 10 years (2000-2010), the population has changed at a rate of 6.1%. Migration accounted for 12.4%, while births and deaths accounted for -4.1%.

Most of the population (as of 2000) speaks German (422 or 97.2%) as their first language, French is the second most common (3 or 0.7%) and Italian is the third (3 or 0.7%).

As of 2008, the population was 49.7% male and 50.3% female. The population was made up of 198 Swiss men (45.5% of the population) and 18 (4.1%) non-Swiss men. There were 193 Swiss women (44.4%) and 26 (6.0%) non-Swiss women. Of the population in the municipality, 183 or about 42.2% were born in Iseltwald and lived there in 2000. There were 129 or 29.7% who were born in the same canton, while 81 or 18.7% were born somewhere else in Switzerland, and 33 or 7.6% were born outside of Switzerland.

As of 2010, children and teenagers (0–19 years old) make up 18.9% of the population, while adults (20–64 years old) make up 58.6% and seniors (over 64 years old) make up 22.5%.

As of 2000, 180 people were single and never married in the municipality. There were 208 married individuals, 30 widows or widowers, and 16 individuals who are divorced.

As of 2000, 66 households consist of only one person, and 7 households with five or more people. In 2000, a total of 177 apartments (52.1% of the total) were permanently occupied, while 135 apartments (39.7%) were seasonally occupied and 28 apartments (8.2%) were empty. As of 2010, the construction rate of new housing units was 110.3 new units per 1000 residents. The vacancy rate for the municipality, in 2011, was 0.23%.

The historical population is given in the following chart:

== Sights ==
The entire village of Iseltwald is designated as part of the Inventory of Swiss Heritage Sites.

== Politics ==
In the 2011 federal election, the most popular party was the Swiss People's Party (SVP), which received 42.2% of the vote. The next three most popular parties were the Conservative Democratic Party (BDP) (25%), the Social Democratic Party (SP) (11.9%) and the Federal Democratic Union of Switzerland (EDU) (4.9%). In the federal election, a total of 140 votes were cast, and the voter turnout was 42.3%.

== Economy ==
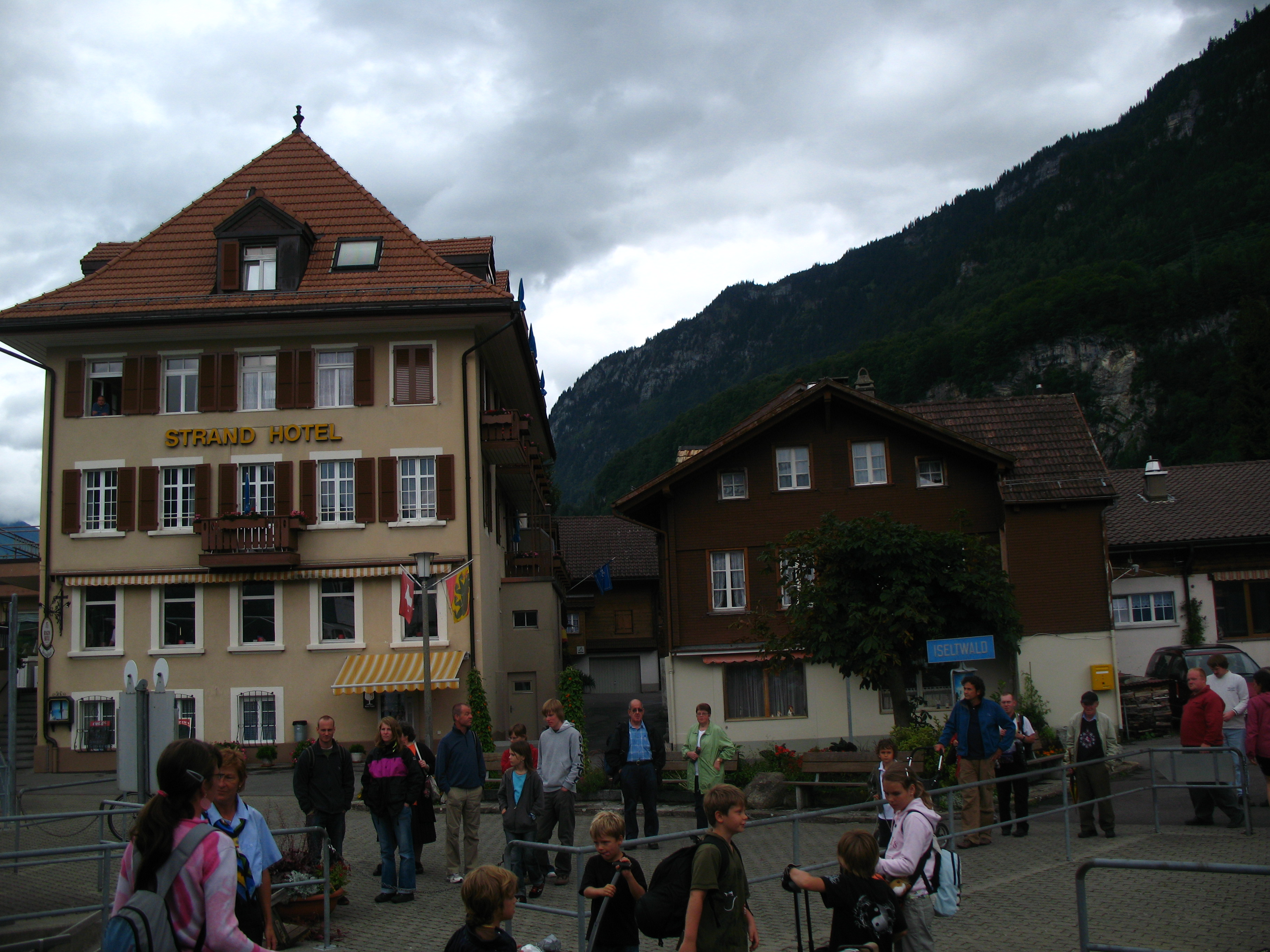
Hotel Strand on the waterfront in Iseltwald

As of 2011, Iseltwald had an unemployment rate of 1.49%. As of 2008, there were a total of 222 people employed in the municipality. Of these, there were 26 people employed in the primary economic sector and about 10 businesses involved in this sector. 19 people were employed in the secondary sector and there were 8 businesses in this sector. 177 people were employed in the tertiary sector, with 16 businesses in this sector. 210 residents of the municipality were employed in some capacity, of which females made up 43.8% of the workforce.

In 2008 there were a total of 187 full-time equivalent jobs. The number of jobs in the primary sector was 14, of which 12 were in agriculture and 2 were in fishing or fisheries. The number of jobs in the secondary sector was 17, of which 9 (52.9%) were in manufacturing and 8 (47.1%) were in construction. The number of jobs in the tertiary sector was 156. In the tertiary sector; 61 or 39.1% were in a hotel or restaurant, 2 or 1.3% were in the information industry, 6 or 3.8% were in education and 81 or 51.9% were in health care.

In 2000, 42 workers commuted into the municipality and 101 workers commuted away. The municipality is a net exporter of workers, with about 2.4 workers leaving the municipality for every one entering. Of the working population, 7.1% used public transportation to get to work, and 44.3% used a private car.

== Religion ==
From the 2000 census, 38 or 8.8% were Roman Catholic, while 318 or 73.3% belonged to the Swiss Reformed Church. Of the rest of the population, there was 1 individual who belonged to the Christian Catholic Church, and there were 54 individuals (or about 12.44% of the population) who belonged to another Christian church. There was 1 individual who was Muslim. There was 1 person who was Buddhist. 40 (or about 9.22% of the population) belonged to no church, are agnostic or atheist, and 8 individuals (or about 1.84% of the population) did not answer the question.

== Education ==
In Iseltwald, about 174 or (40.1%) of the population have completed non-mandatory upper secondary education, and 35 or (8.1%) have completed additional higher education (either university or a Fachhochschule). Of the 35 who completed tertiary schooling, 54.3% were Swiss men, 40.0% were Swiss women.

The Canton of Bern school system provides one year of non-obligatory Kindergarten, followed by six years of Primary school. This is followed by three years of obligatory lower Secondary school, where the students are separated according to ability and aptitude. Following the lower Secondary students may attend additional schooling or they may enter an apprenticeship.

During the 2010-11 school year, there were a total of 36 students attending classes in Iseltwald. There was one kindergarten class with a total of 6 students in the municipality. Of the kindergarten students, 33.3% have a different mother language than the classroom language. The municipality had one primary class and 26 students. Of the primary students, 11.5% were permanent or temporary residents of Switzerland (not citizens), and 19.2% had a different mother language than the classroom language. During the same year, there was one lower secondary class with a total of 4 students.

As of 2000, 8 students from Iseltwald attended schools outside the municipality.

== Transport ==
For a long time, the only access to the village was through a small regional road or by ferry. Since the building of the A8 motorway in 1988, the village has had its own junction.

PostBus Switzerland bus service 103 connects Iseltwald to Interlaken on an hourly basis, serving both Interlaken West and Interlaken Ost stations. In summer, the village is also served by BLS AG shipping services, which operate on Lake Brienz serving various points between Interlaken Ost and Brienz.

== Tourism ==
Iseltwald is a popular destination for backpackers and skiers in the Jungfraujoch region. The village has a host of backpacker hostels and Bed and Breakfasts.

== Media ==
In the South Korean drama Crash Landing on You, Iseltwald was the setting for scenes of the main character, Ri Jeong Hyeok, attending music school in Switzerland as a pianist when he became aware of his older brother's death before the beginning of the series.
