= List of aerial tramways in Switzerland =

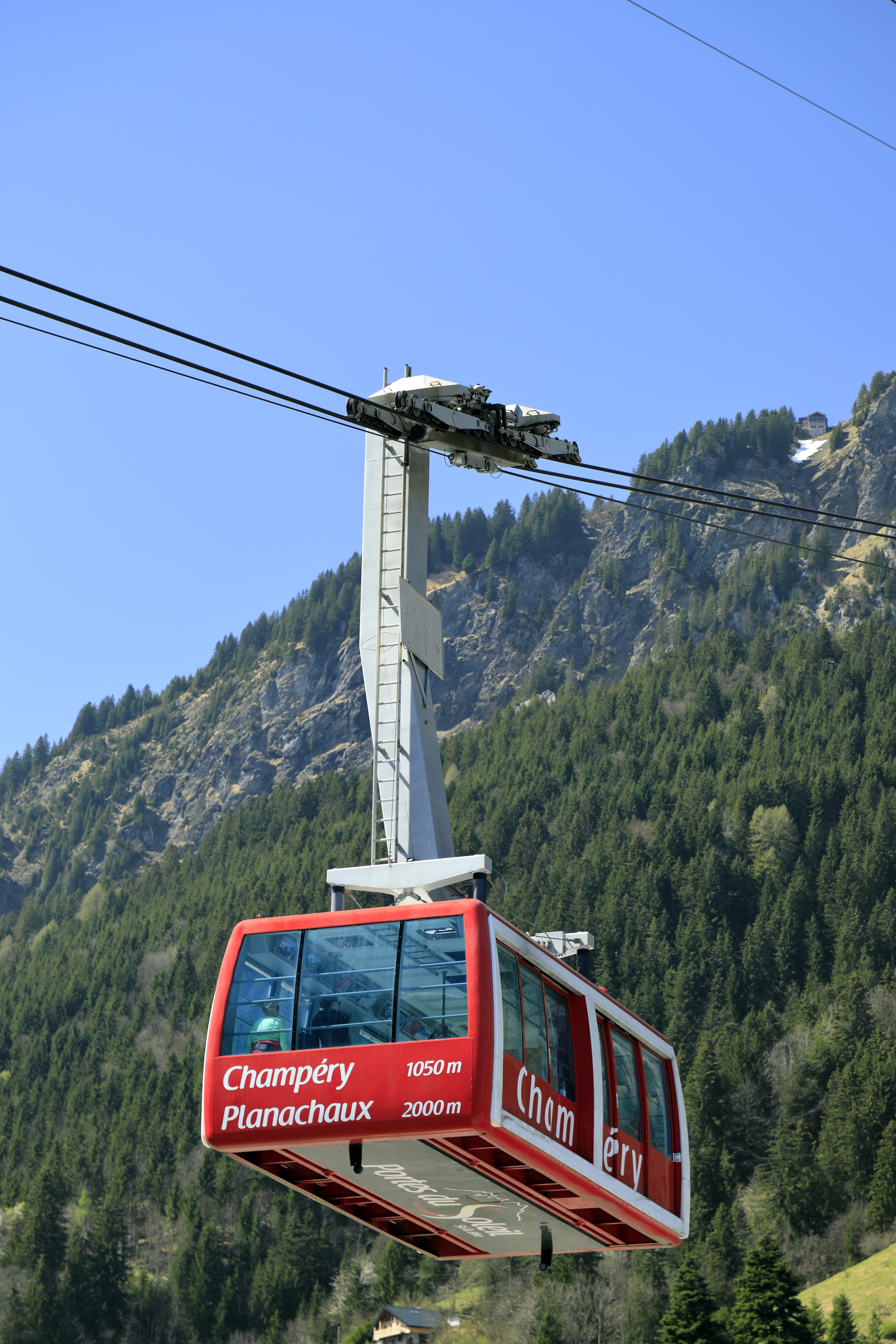
Aerial tram Champéry–Planachaux

This is a list of publicly available aerial tramways in Switzerland (excluding other types of aerial lifts), according to official timetables 2004.

Not all Swiss aerial tramways are open all year. Some of them are sections of aerial lift systems that consist also of other types of aerial lifts besides the tramway in this list. For example, the aerial tramway Blauherd - Rothorn is part of the Zermatt - Sunnegga - Blauherd - Rothorn system, its section Zermatt - Sunnegga being a funicular and Sunnegga - Blauherd a gondola lift.

Western Switzerland and Valais

- Plan-Francey - Le Moléson
- Col du Pillon - Glacier3000 (Diablerets)
- Champéry - Planachaux
- Dorénaz - Champex-d'Alesse
- Les Attelas - Mont Gelé
- Tortin - Col-des-Gentianes
- Col-des-Gentianes -Mont Fort
- La Chaux - Col-des-Gentianes
- Riddes - Isérables
- Bottom of Grande Dixence Dam - Top of Grande Dixence Dam
- Chalais - Vercorin
- Zinal - Sorebois
- Cry-d'Er - Bella Lui
- Cabane-des-Violettes - Pointe de la Plaine Morte
- Leukerbad - Gemmipass
- Leukerbad - Rinderhütte
- Turtmann - Unterems - Oberems
- Gampel - Jeizinen
- Raron - Eischoll
- Raron - Unterbäch
- Wiler - Lauchernalp
- Stalden - Staldenried - Gspon
- Kalpetran - Embd
- Embd - Schalb
- Zermatt - Furi - Trockener Steg - Klein Matterhorn
- Furgg - Trockener Steg
- Blauherd - Rothorn
- Gornergrat - Hohtällli - Stockhorn
- Hohtälli - Rote Nase
- Gant-Hohtälli Aerial Tramway (94 metre tall aerial lift pylon)
- Spielboden - Längfluh
- Felskinn - Mittelallalin
- Saas Fee - Felskinn
- Saas Grund - Hohsaas
- Blatten - Belalp
- Mörel - Greich - Riederalp
- Betten Talstation - Bettmeralp (direct line)
- Betten Talstation - Betten Dorf - Bettmeralp
- Fiesch - Fiescheralp - Eggishorn
- Fürgangen - Bellwald
- Erlenbach i.S. - Chrindi - Stockhorn
- Lenk (Rotenbach) - Metsch
- Gsteig - Lac de Sanetsch
- Reusch - Oldenegg

Bernese Oberland

- Grindelwald - First
- Grindelwald - Pfingstegg
- Kandersteg - Allmenalp
- Kandersteg - Sunnbüel (Gemmi)
- Eisigbach (Frutigen) - Eisigenalp
- Unter dem Birg (Adelboden) - Engstligenalp
- Luftseilbahn Wengen-Männlichen: Wengen - Männlichen
- Isenfluh - Sunnwald
- Stechelberg - Mürren - Schilthorn
- Bergbahn Lauterbrunnen–Mürren: Mürren-Lauterbrunnen

Central Switzerland

- Sörenberg Schönenboden - Brienzer Rothorn
- Fräkmüntegg - Pilatus Kulm (opened 1956)
- Lungern - Turren
- Distelboden (Melchsee-Frutt) - Bonistock
- Engelberg - Brunni (Ristis)
- Engelberg - Fürenalp
- Trübsee - Stand - Klein Titlis
- Fell (Oberrickenbach) - Chrüzhütte (Bannalp)
- Fellboden (Oberrickenbach) - Bannalpsee
- Dallenwil - Wirzweli
- Dallenwil - Niederrickenbach
- Stans-Kälti - Stanserhorn
- Beckenried - Klewenalp
- Emmetten - Niederbauen
- Küssnacht am Rigi - Seebodenalp
- Weggis - Rigi Kaltbad
- Kräbel - Rigi Scheidegg
- Brunnen - Urmiberg
- Stoos - Fronalpstock
- Morschach - Stoos
- Sali (Bisisthal) - Glattalp
- Illgau - Ried (Muotathal)
- Brunni - Holzegg Pass
- Weglosen - Seebli (Hoch-Ybrig)
- Amsteg - Arnisee
- St. Jakob - Gitschenen
- Attinghausen (Ballweg) - Brüsti
- Flüelen - Eggberge
- Bürglen UR - Biel (Kinzig)
- Schattdorf - Haldi
- Bristen - Golzern
- Andermatt - Gemsstock
- Intschi - Arnisee

Ticino

- Airolo - Pesciüm
- Pesciüm - Sasso della Boggia
- Rodi - Lago Tremorgio
- Arvigo - Braggio
- Selma - Landarenca
- Orselina - Cardada
- Intragna - Costa
- Verdascio - Rasa
- San Carlo - Robiei
- Brusino Arsizio - Serpiano
- Rivera - Alpe Foppa

Eastern Switzerland and Zurich

- Luftseilbahn Adliswil-Felsenegg (LAF): Adliswil - Felsenegg
- Jakobsbad - Kronberg
- Schwägalp - Säntis
- Wasserauen - Ebenalp
- Brülisau - Hoher Kasten
- Frümsen - Stauberen
- Iltios - Chäserugg
- Unterterzen - Tannbodenalp (Flumserberg)
- Niederurnen - Morgenholz
- Kies - Mettmen
- Matt - Weissenberg (Switzerland)

Grisons (Graubünden)

- (Buochwald) Malans - Älpli
- Fanas - Eggli
- Klosters - Gotschnaboden - Gotschnagrat (Parsenn)
- Weissfluhjoch - Weissfluhgipfel
- Parsennhütte - Weissfluhjoch
- Dörfji - Mitteltälli (Pischa)
- Davos Platz - Ischalp - Jakobshorn
- Chur - Känzeli (opened 2006)
- Naraus - Cassonsgrat
- Laax - Crap Sogn Gion - Crap Masegn
- Disentis - Caischavedra
- Arosa - Weisshorn
- Arosa - Lenzerheide
- Lenzerheide - Scharmoin - Parpaner Rothorn
- Rhäzüns - Feldis/Veulden
- Pranzaira - Albigna
- Sils Maria - Furtschellas (Prasüra)
- Surlej/Silvaplana - Murtèl - Corvatsch
- St. Moritz Bad - Signal
- Corviglia - Piz Nair
- Bernina - Diavolezza
- Curtinatsch - Piz Lagalb
- Samnaun Ravaisch - Alp Trider Sattel
- Silenen - Chilcherberge

== See also ==
- Rail transport in Switzerland
- List of funiculars in Switzerland
- List of mountain railways in Switzerland
- List of mountains of Switzerland accessible by public transport
- Wetterhorn Elevator, defunct aerial tramway
