= Snowmaking =

Artificial production of snow

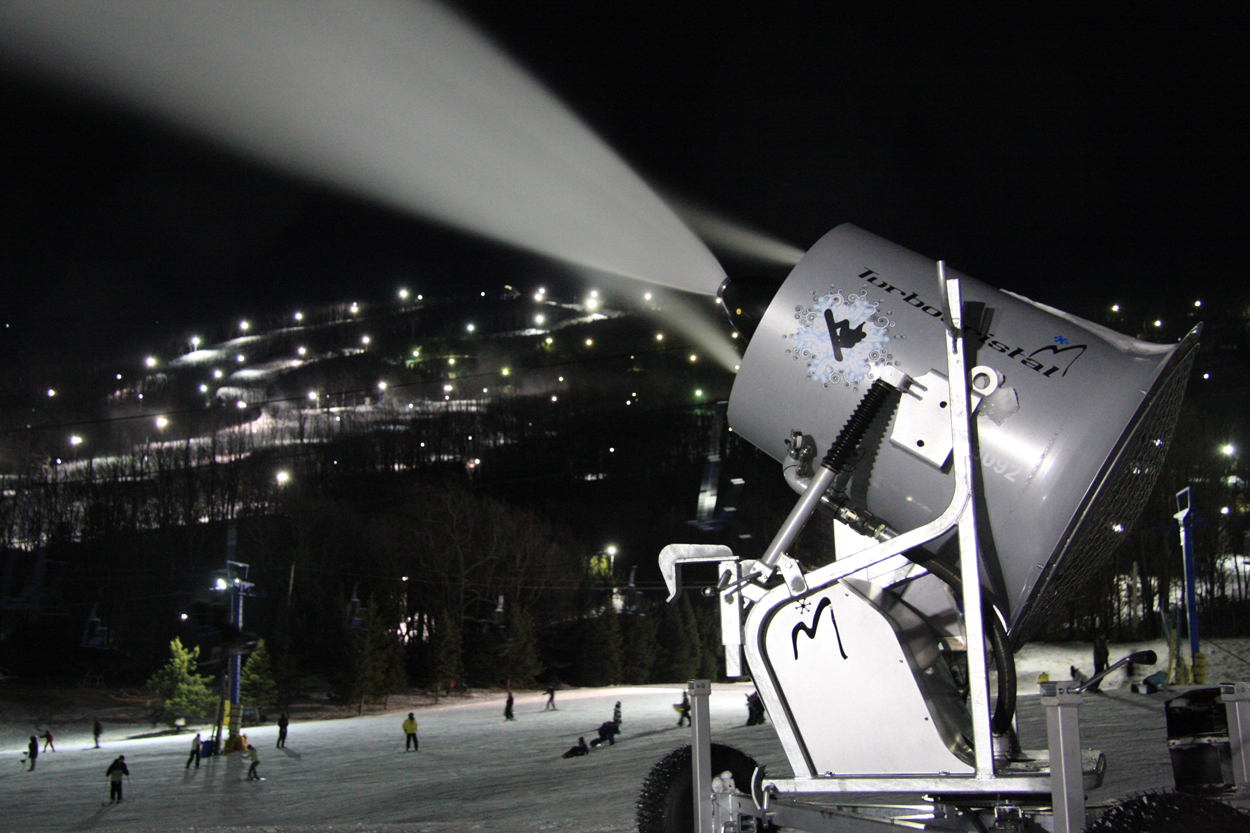
Snow gun in operation at Camelback Mountain Resort in the Pocono Mountains of Pennsylvania, United States

Snowmaking is the production of snow by forcing water and pressurized air through a "snow gun", also known as a "snow cannon". Snowmaking is mainly used at ski resorts to supplement natural snow. This allows ski resorts to improve the reliability of their snow cover and to extend their ski seasons from late autumn to early spring. Indoor ski slopes use snowmaking. They can generally do so year-round as they have climate-controlled environments.

The use of snowmaking machines has become more common as changing weather patterns and the popularity of indoor ski resorts create a demand for snow beyond that which is provided by nature. Snowmaking machines have addressed the shortage in the supply of snow; however, there are significant environmental costs associated with the artificial production of snow.

According to the European Environment Agency, the length of snow seasons in the northern hemisphere has decreased by five days each decade since the 1970s, thus increasing the demand for the production of artificial snow. Some ski resorts use artificial snow to extend their ski seasons and augment natural snowfall; however, there are some resorts that rely almost entirely upon artificial snow production. Artificial snow was used extensively at the 2014 Winter Olympics in Sochi, the 2018 Winter Olympics in Pyeongchang and the 2022 Winter Olympics in Beijing to supplement natural snowfall and provide the best possible conditions for competition.

The production of snow requires low temperatures. The threshold temperature for snowmaking increases as humidity decreases. Wet-bulb temperature is used as a metric since it takes air temperature and relative humidity into account. The bulb temperature is always below the outside temperature. The damper the air, the less moisture it can absorb. The higher the atmospheric humidity, the colder it must be to turn the small water droplets into snow crystals.

Examples:

- 0 °C (32 °F) dry temperature and a humidity of 90% are equal to a wet-bulb temperature of −0.6 °C (30.9 °F)
- 0 °C (32 °F) dry temperature and a humidity of 30% are equal to a wet-bulb temperature of −4.3 °C (24.3 °F)
- +2.0 °C (35.6 °F) dry temperature and a humidity of 90% are equal to a wet-bulb temperature of +1.5 °C (34.7 °F)
- +2.0 °C (35.6 °F) dry temperature and a humidity of 30% are equal to a wet-bulb temperature of −2.8 °C (27.0 °F)

To start a snowmaking system, a wet-bulb temperature of −2.5 °C (27.5 °F) is required. If the atmospheric humidity is very low, this level can be reached at temperatures slightly above 0 °C (32 °F), but if the air humidity is high, colder temperatures are required. Temperatures around freezing point are referred to as borderline temperatures or limit temperatures. If the wet-bulb temperature drops, more snow can be produced faster and more efficiently.

Snowmaking is an energy-intense process, and has environmental impacts, both of which inherently limit its use.

== History ==
The first artificial snowflake was created by Ukichiro Nakaya in 1936, three years after his first attempt.

Americans Art Hunt, Dave Richey, and Wayne Pierce invented the snow cannon in 1950, but secured a patent sometime later. In 1952, Grossinger's Catskill Resort Hotel became the first in the world to use artificial snow. Snowmaking began to be used extensively in the early 1970s. Many ski resorts depend heavily upon snowmaking.

Snowmaking has achieved greater efficiency with increasing complexity. Traditionally, snowmaking quality depended upon the skill of the equipment operator. Today, computer control supplements that skill with greater precision, such that a snow gun operates only when snowmaking is optimal.

== Operation ==
A graph of air temperature against relative humidity: if conditions are below the curve, snow can be made.

The key considerations in snow production are increasing water and energy efficiency and increasing the environmental window in which snow can be made.

Snowmaking plants require water pumps – and sometimes air compressors when using lances – that are both large and expensive. The energy required to make artificial snow is about 0.6–0.7 kW h/m^{3} for lances and 1–2 kW h/m^{3} for fan guns. The density of artificial snow is between 400 and 500 kg/m^{3} and the water consumption for producing snow is roughly equal to that number.

Snowmaking begins with a water supply such as a river or reservoir. Water is pumped up a pipeline on the mountain using very large electric pumps in a pump house. This water is distributed through an intricate series of valves and pipes to any trails that require snowmaking. Most resorts also add a nucleating agent to ensure that as much water as possible freezes and turns into snow. These products are organic or inorganic materials that facilitate the water molecules to form the proper shape to freeze into ice crystals. The products are non-toxic and biodegradable.

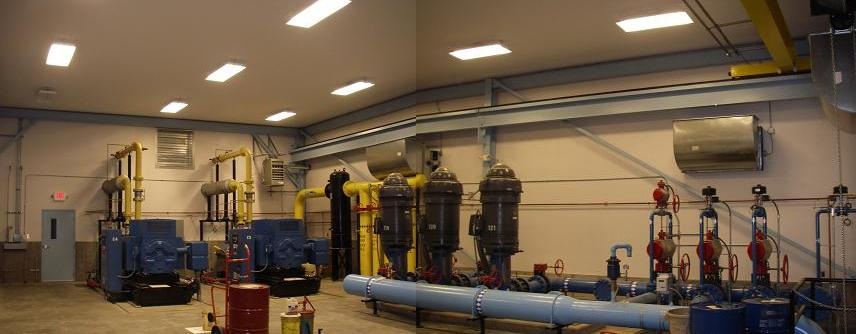
Pump house and air plant combination

The next step in the snowmaking process is to add air using an air plant. This plant is often a building which contains electric or diesel industrial air compressors the size of a van or truck. However, in some instances air compression is provided using diesel-powered, portable trailer-mounted compressors which can be added to the system. Many fan-type snow guns have on-board electric air compressors, which allows for cheaper and more compact operation. A ski area may have the required high-output water pumps, but not an air pump. Onboard compressors are cheaper and easier than having a dedicated pumping house. The air is generally cooled and excess moisture is removed before it is sent out of the plant. Some systems even cool the water before it enters the system. This improves the snowmaking process as the less heat in the air and water, the less heat must be dissipated to the atmosphere to freeze the water. From this plant the air travels up a separate pipeline following the same path as the water pipeline.

=== Ice nucleation-active proteins ===
The water is sometimes mixed with ina (ice nucleation-active) proteins from the bacterium Pseudomonas syringae. These proteins serve as effective nuclei to initiate the formation of ice crystals at relatively high temperatures, so that the droplets will turn into ice before falling to the ground. The bacterium itself uses these ina proteins in order to injure plants.

=== Infrastructure ===
Piping diagram

The pipes following the trails are equipped with shelters containing hydrants, electrical power and, optionally, communication lines mounted.

Whereas shelters for fan guns require only water, power and maybe communication, lance shelters usually need air hydrants as well. Hybrid shelters allow maximum flexibility to connect each snow machine type as they have all supplies available. The typical distance for lance shelters is 100–150 feet (30–46 m), for fan guns 250–300 feet (76–91 m). From these hydrants 1 1/2–2 in (38–51 mm) pressure resistant hoses are connected similar to fire hoses with camlocks to the snow machine.

The infrastructure to support snowmaking may have a negative environmental impact, altering water tables near reservoirs and mineral and nutrient content of the soil under the snow itself.

== Snowmaking guns ==
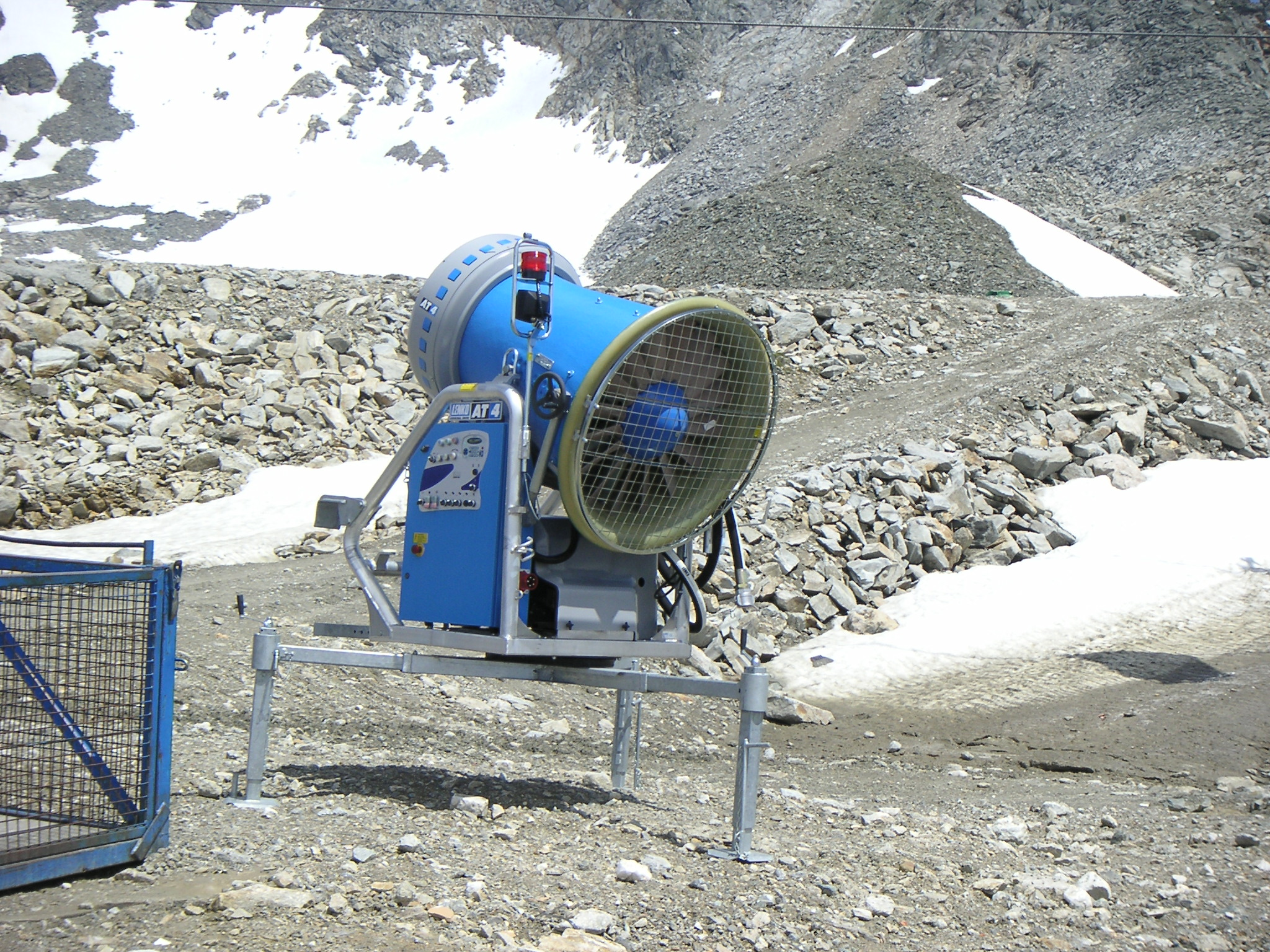
Rear view of snow cannon at Mölltaler Gletscher, Austria, showing the powerful fan

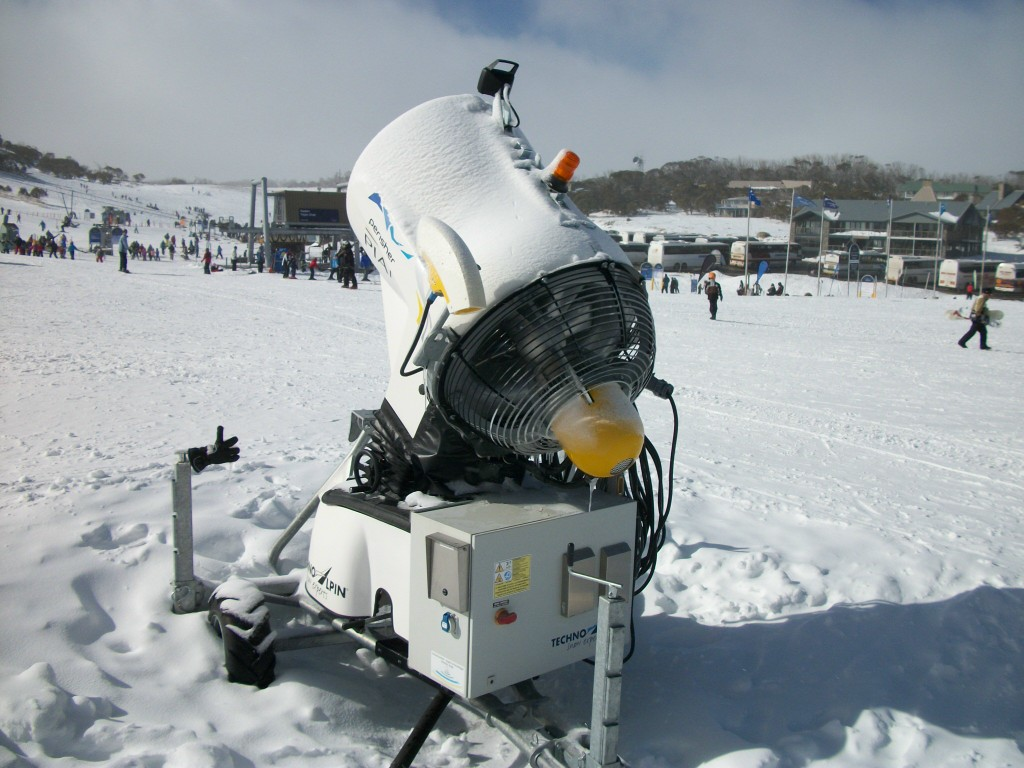
A snow making machine at Smiggin Holes, New South Wales, Australia

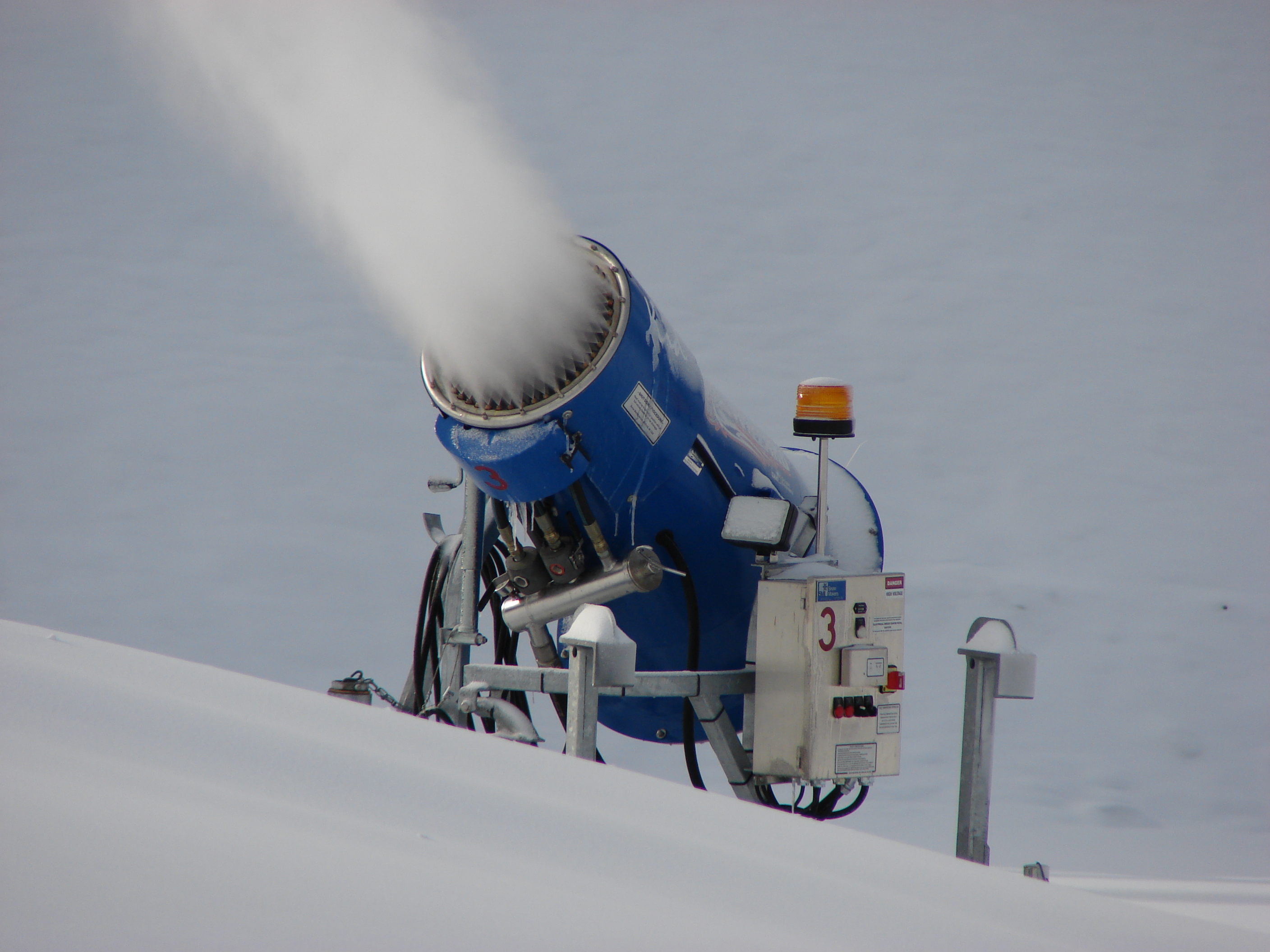
Full blast snow cannon at The Nordic Centre, Canmore, Alberta, Canada

There are many forms of snowmaking guns; however, they all share the basic principle of combining air and water to form snow. For most guns the type or "quality" of snow can be changed by regulating the amount of water in the mixture. For others, the water and air are simply on or off and the snow quality is determined by the air temperature and humidity.

In general there are three types of snowmaking guns: internal mixing, external mixing and fan guns. These come in two main styles of makers: air water guns and fan guns.

An air water gun can be mounted on a tower or on a stand on the ground. It uses higher pressure water and air, while a fan gun uses a powerful axial fan to propel the water jet to a great distance.

Snowmaker in operation

A modern snow fan usually consists of one or more rings of nozzles which inject water into the fan air stream. A separate nozzle or small group of nozzles is fed with a mix of water and compressed air and produces the nucleation points for the snow crystals. The small droplets of water and the tiny ice crystals are then mixed and propelled out by a powerful fan, after which they further cool through evaporation in the surrounding air as they fall to the ground. The crystals of ice act as seeds to make the water droplets freeze at 0 °C (32 °F). Without these crystals the water would supercool instead of freezing. This method can produce snow when the wet-bulb temperature of the air is as high as −1 °C (30 °F). The lower the air temperature is, the more and the better snow a cannon can make. This is one of the main reasons snow cannons are usually operated in the night. The quality of the mixing of the water and air streams and their relative pressures is crucial to the amount of snow made and its quality.

Modern snow cannons are fully computerized and can operate autonomously or be remotely-controlled from a central location. Operational parameters are: starting and stopping time, quality of snow, maximum wet-bulb temperature in which to operate, maximum windspeed, horizontal and vertical orientation, and sweep angle (to cover a wider or narrower area). Sweep angle and area may follow wind direction.

- Internal mixing guns have a chamber where the water and air are mixed together and forced through jets or through holes and fall to the ground as snow. These guns are typically low to the ground on a frame or tripod and require a lot of air to compensate for the short hang time (time the water is airborne). Some newer guns are built in a tower form and use much less air because of the increased hang time. The amount of water flow determines the type of snow that is to be made and is controlled by an adjustable water valve.
- External mixing guns have a nozzle spraying water as a stream and air nozzles shooting air through this water stream to break it up into much smaller water particles. These guns are sometimes equipped with a set of internal mixing nozzles that are known as nucleators. These help create a nucleus for the water droplets to bond to as they freeze. External mixing guns are typically tower guns and rely on a longer hang time to freeze the snow. This allows them to use much less air. External mixing guns are usually reliant on high water pressure to operate correctly so the water supply is opened completely, though in some the flow can be regulated by valves on the gun.
- Fan guns are differ from other gun types because they require electricity to power a fan as well as an on-board reciprocating piston air compressor; modern fan guns do not require compressed air from an external source. Compressed air and water are shot out of the gun through a variety of nozzles (there are many different designs) and then the wind from the large fan blows this into a mist in the air to achieve a long hang time. Fan guns have anywhere from 12 to 360 water nozzles on a ring on the front of the gun through which the fan blows air. These banks can be controlled by valves. The valves are either manual, manual electric, or automatic electric (controlled by logic controller or computer).

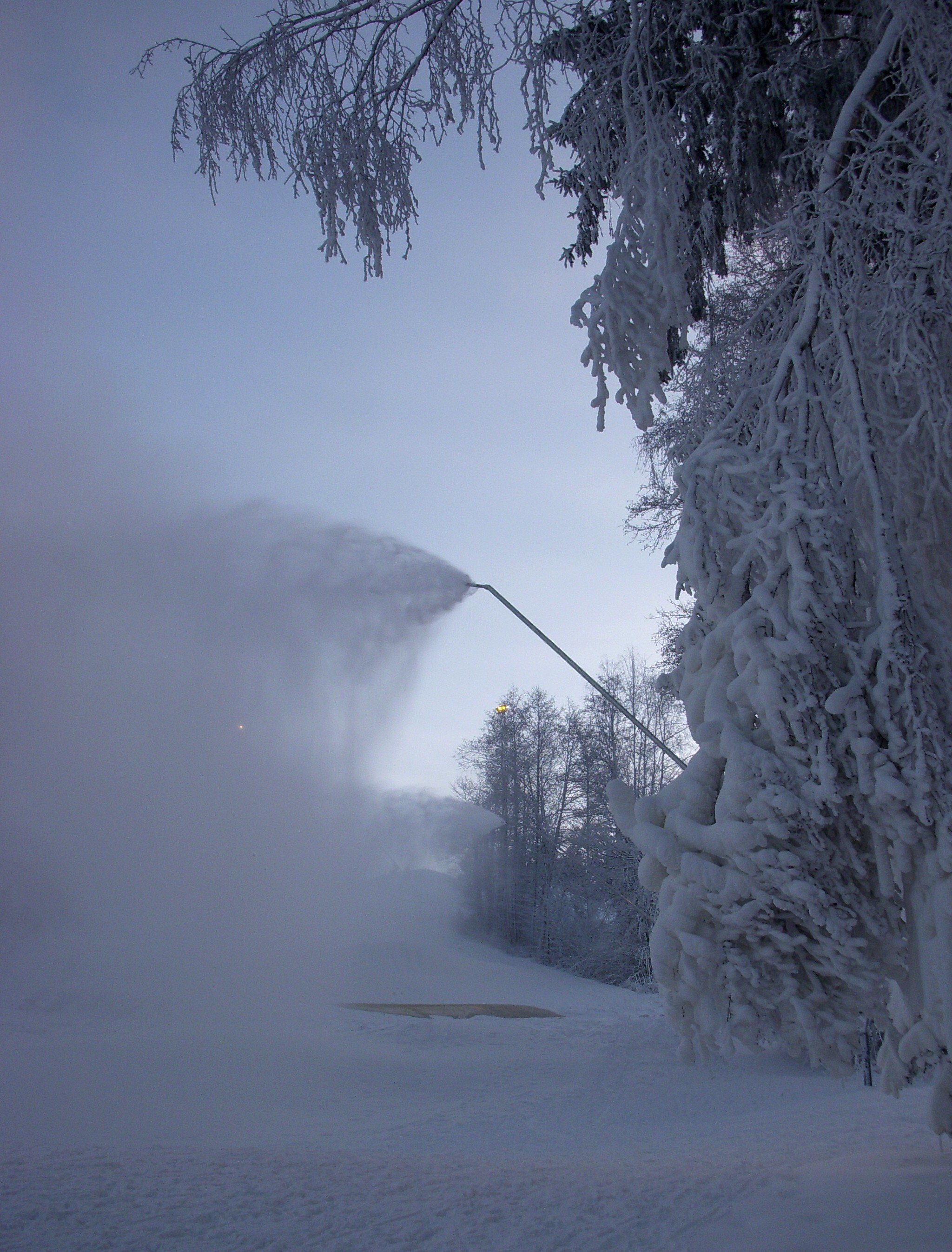
Snow lance used at Flottsbro in Stockholm

- Snow lances are up to 12 meter long vertically inclined aluminum tubes at the head of which are placed water and/or air nucleators. Air is blown into the atomized water at the outlet from the water nozzle. The previously compressed air expands and cools, creating ice nuclei on which crystallization of the atomized water takes place. The height and the slow rate of descent allow sufficient time for this process. This process uses less energy than a fan gun, but has a smaller range and lower snow quality; it also has greater sensitivity to wind. Advantages over fan gun are: lower investment (only cable system with air and water, central compressor station), much quieter, half the energy consumption for the same amount of snow, simpler maintenance due to lower wear and fewer moving parts, and regulation of snowmaking is possible in principle. The working pressure of snow lances is 20-60 bar. There are also small mobile systems for the home user that are operated by the garden connection (Home Snow).

=== Home snowmaking ===
Smaller versions of the snow machines found at ski resorts exist, scaled down to run off household size air and water supplies. Home snowmakers receive their water supply either from a garden hose or from a pressure washer, which makes more snow per hour. Plans also exist for do-it-yourself snowmaking machines made out of plumbing fittings and special nozzles, or pressure washer nozzles. Pressurized air is typically supplied from standard air compressors.

Volumes of snow output by home snowmakers depend on the air/water mixture, temperature, wind variations, pumping capacity, water supply, air supply, and other factors. Using a household spray bottle will not work unless temperatures are well below the freezing point of water.

== Extent of use ==
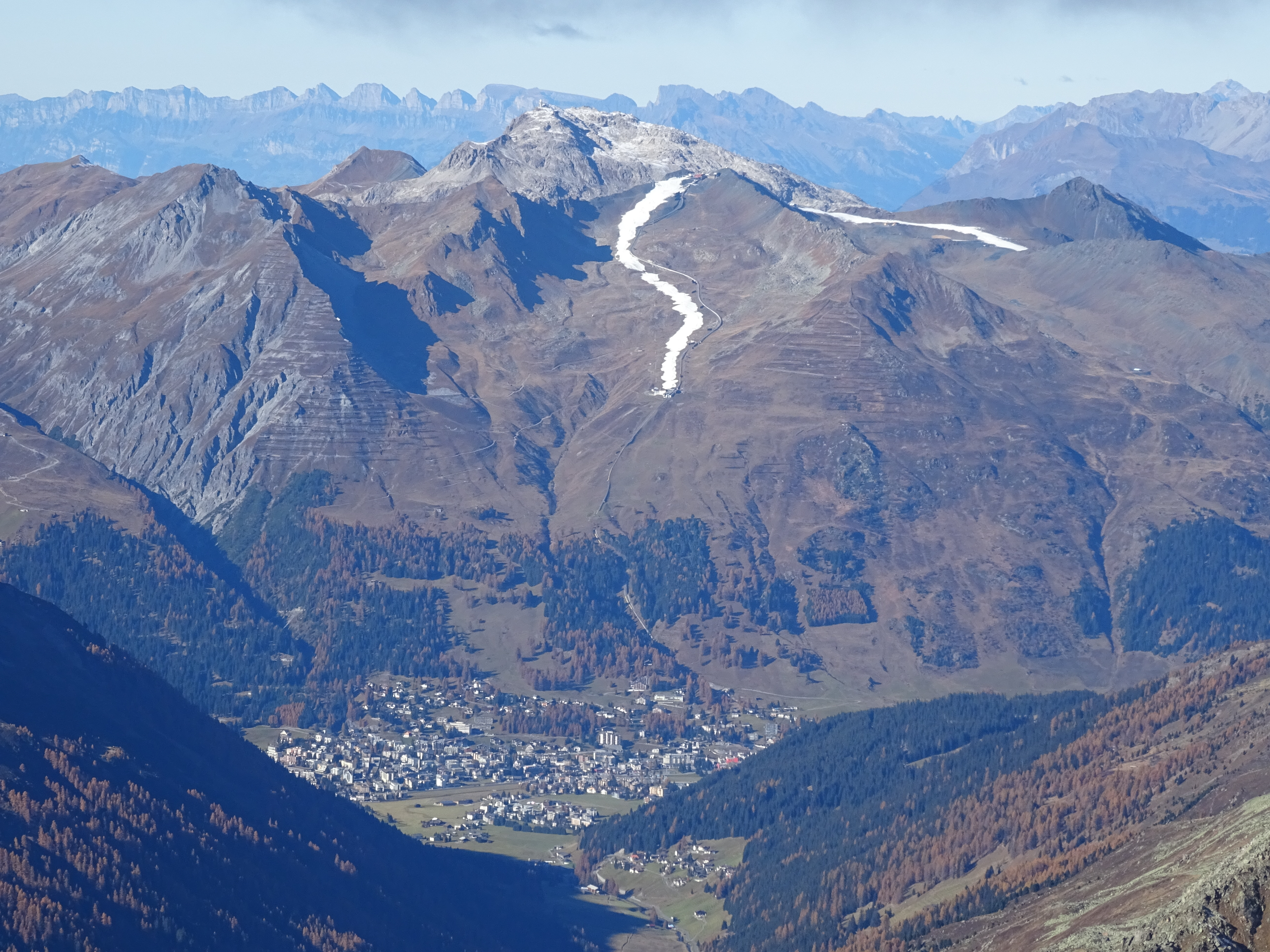
Parsenn ski resort near Davos, Switzerland, compensating for low snowfall by producing artificial snow

By the 2009–2010 ski season, it was estimated that around 88% of ski resorts belonging to the US National Ski Areas Association were using artificial snow to supplement natural snowfall. In the European Alps the proportion of ski slopes that can be covered by artificial snow varies among countries (Germany 25%, France 37%, Switzerland 53%, Austria 70%, Italy 90%). Since 1985, average aggregate temperatures in the contiguous United States for the months of November through February have consistently been above the average temperatures for those months measured between 1901 and 2000 as graphed in Figure 1. Such a trend both limits and encourages the use of artificial snow. Rising temperatures will result in greater snowmelt and decreased snowfall, thus forcing ski resorts to depend more heavily upon the use of artificial snow. However, once temperatures approach 6 °C (43 °F), snowmaking is not viable given the current technology. The photograph of Parsenn to the right demonstrates the use of artificial snow to supplement natural snowfall. The strip of white going down the mountain is a ski slope that has been opened due to extensive use of snowmaking technology.

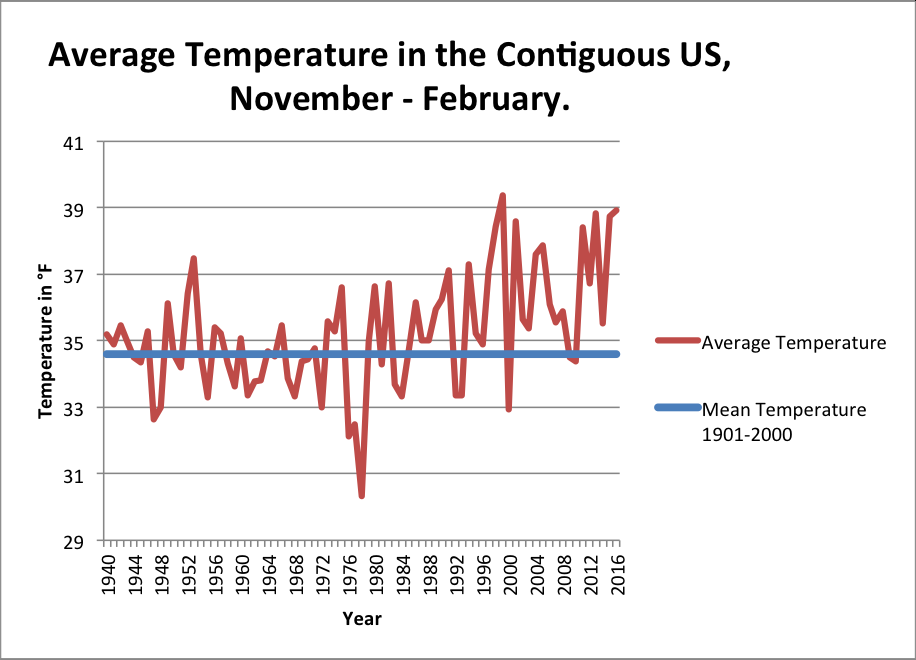
Figure 1. Average winter temperatures for the contiguous United States

As the use of artificial snow becomes more common and efficient, developers may seek to build new or expand existing ski resorts, as was the case with the Arizona Snowbowl ski resort. Such an action could cause significant deforestation, the loss of fragile and rare ecosystems, and cultural opposition. The high costs associated with the production of artificial snow serve as a barrier to entry for its use. It was estimated that in 2008 it cost approximately US$131,000 to purchase a snow gun and develop the necessary infrastructure. Overall, approximately US$61 million have been invested in snowmaking technology in the French Alps, US$1,005 million in Austria, and US$415 million in Switzerland. Furthermore, 50% of the average American ski resort's energy costs are generated by the production of artificial snow.

== Economics ==
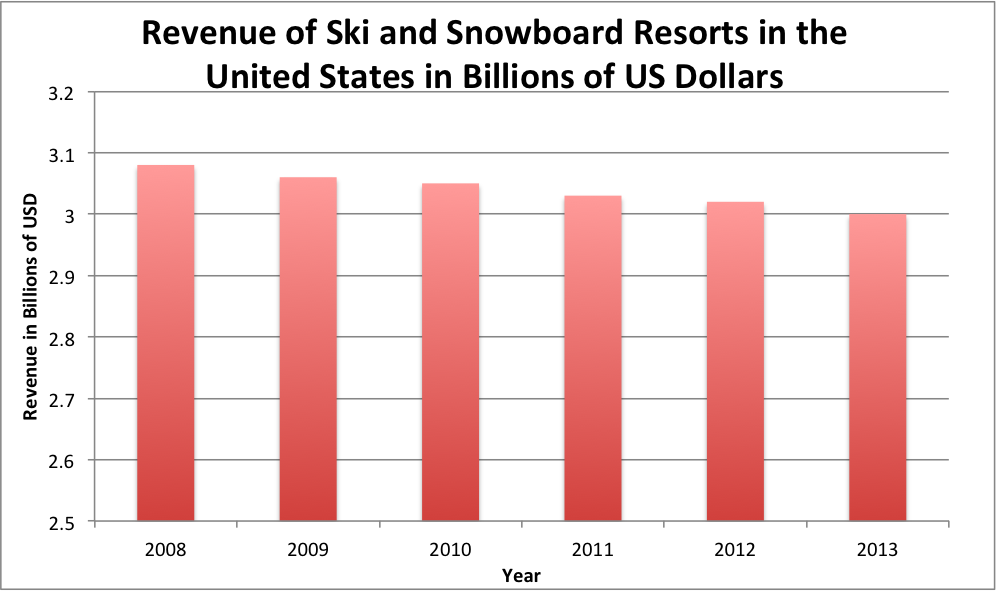
Figure 2. Models trends in ski and snowboard resort revenues

Snowmaking machines allow ski resorts to extend their seasons and sustain their businesses in times of low snowfall. With changing climate trends, snowfall is becoming increasingly unpredictable, thus jeopardizing the economic success of ski resorts. Between 2008 and 2013, American ski and snowboard resorts experienced annual revenues of about US$3 billion. Such high levels of revenue increase the demand for predictable and adequate amounts of snow cover, which can be achieved through artificial snowmaking practices. While the economic benefit of ski resorts has been around US$3 billion as of the early 2010s (see Figure 2), the additional economic value of winter tourism in the United States is estimated to be around US$12.2 billion per year. These additional benefits come in the form of spending at hotels, restaurants, gas stations, and other local businesses. Additionally, winter tourism supports around 211,900 jobs in the United States, which amounts to a total of approximately US$7 billion paid in benefits and salaries, US$1.4 billion paid in state and local taxes, and US$1.7 billion paid in federal taxes. The economic benefits of snow sports are great, but also fragile. It is estimated that in years of lower snowfall, there is about a US$1 billion decrease in economic activity.

== Environmental impact and future conditions ==
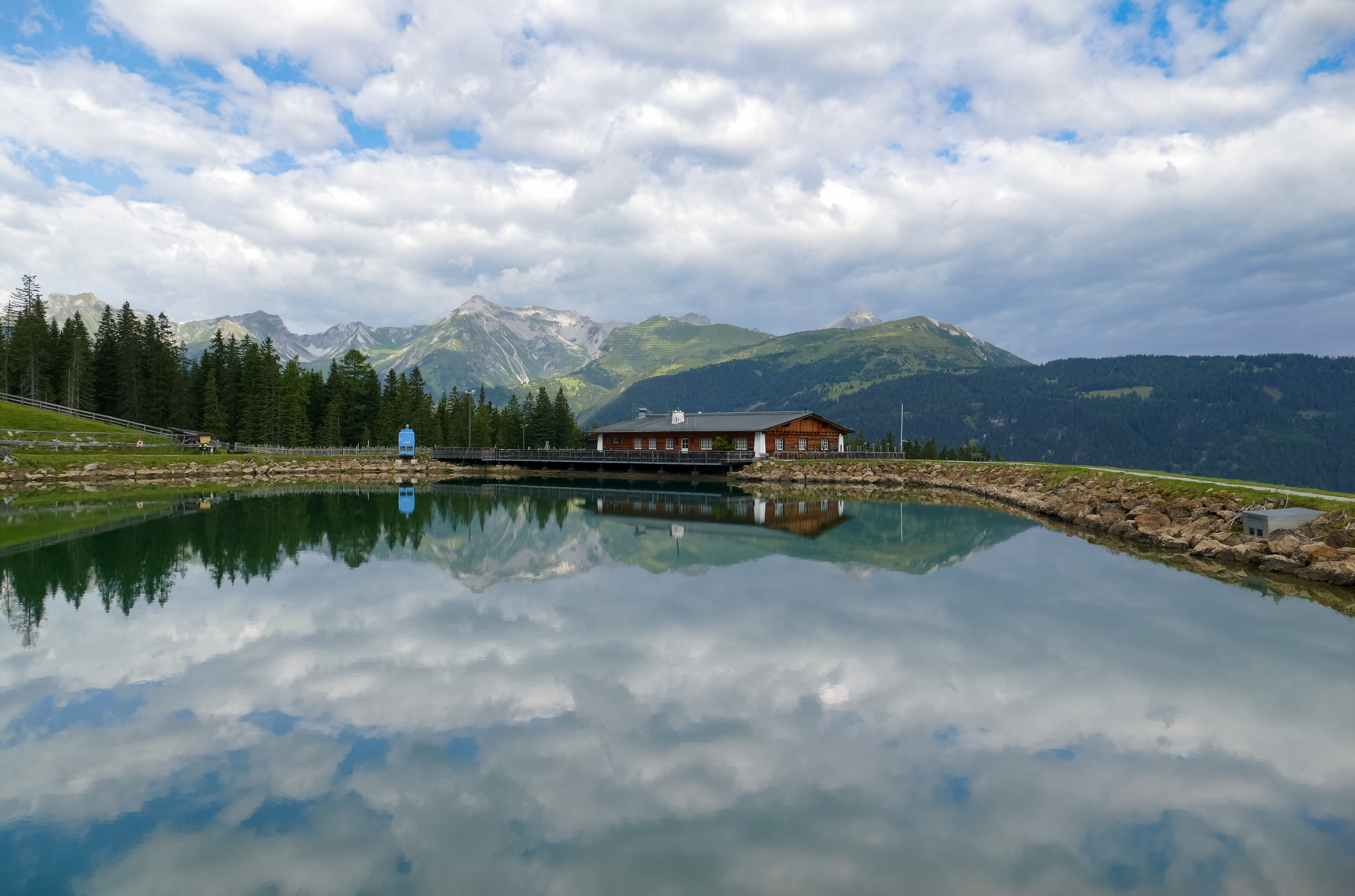
A water reservoir for snowmaking in the Austrian Tyrol of the Stubai Alps

=== Mountain reservoirs ===
The implementation and use of artificial snow making technologies requires the undertaking of major infrastructural projects. These projects result in significant disruptions to local ecosystems. A major infrastructural project associated with the use of artificial snowmaking technology is the mountain reservoir. Many mountain reservoirs are embankment dams that feed underground water pipelines, and pose significant safety risks to nearby populations and ecosystems. In addition to the hazards posed by conventional reservoirs and dams, mountain reservoirs are subject to a variety of mountain-specific hazards. Such hazards include avalanches, rapid flows, and landslides. Approximately 20% of mountain reservoirs are built on avalanche-prone sites, and about 50% are prone to very high hazards. Additionally, mountain reservoirs expel water very quickly, causing massive floods, and significantly jeopardizing public safety. The severity of these hazards is augmented due to their potential impact on lower populations and properties.

=== Water and energy use ===
Snowmaking machines generally require between 3,000 and 4,000 cubic meters of water per hectare of slope covered. Accordingly, it takes approximately 106 gallons (400 litres) of water to produce one cubic meter of snow, and snowmaking machines use about 107 gallons (405 litres) of water per minute. A significant amount of this water is lost due to evaporation, and thus is not returned to the water table. Furthermore, it takes approximately 3.5 to 4.3 kWh of energy to produce one cubic meter of snow; however, this number can be as high as 14 kWh, or as low as 1 kWh per cubic meter of snow. Snowmaking accounts for approximately 50% of the average American ski resort's energy costs, which amounts to about $500,000.

=== Effects on ground and drinking water ===
Ski resorts often use mineralized water in the production of artificial snow, which has adverse impacts on surrounding ecosystems and water tables. Mountain reservoirs are often filled with highly mineralized water, and the runoff from these reservoirs affects the mineral and chemical composition of groundwater, which in turn pollutes drinking water. Furthermore, mountain reservoirs do not allow water to seep back into the ground, so water is only returned to the water table through runoff.

=== Environmental conditions and forecasts ===
As a result of changing weather patterns, snowmaking has become a major revenue-making activity due to a shortage in the supply of natural snow. However, it poses significant environmental threats that may serve to perpetuate the issue that resulted in an increased demand for artificial snow in the first place.

The EPA forecasts temperatures to increase by between 0.28 °C (0.5 °F) and 4.8 °C (8.6 °F) globally with a likely increase of 1.5 °C (2.7 °F), and an average increase in temperatures in the US of between 1.7 °C (3 °F) and 6.7 °C (12 °F) by 2100. Furthermore, scientists predict that snow cover in the northern hemisphere will decrease by 15% by the end of the century with snowpack decreasing and snow seasons shortening concurrently. It's been projected that by the 2050s, fewer than half of the 21 locations historically used for the Winter Olympics and Paralympics (up to Beijing 2022) would still have reliable weather conditions. These predicted changes in temperature and snowfall patterns will induce ski resorts to rely more heavily upon artificial snow which uses significant amounts of water and electricity. As a result, ski resorts will further contribute to the production of greenhouse gases and the issue of water scarcity.

In addition to long-term environmental impacts, artificial snow production poses immediate environmental challenges. Artificial snow takes around two to three weeks longer to melt than does natural snow. As such, the use of artificial snow introduces new threats and challenges to local flora and fauna. Furthermore, the high mineral and nutrient content of the water used to produce artificial snow changes soil composition, which in turn affects which plants are able to grow.

== Secondary effects ==
In addition to the direct effects of the production of artificial snow, snowmaking practices result in various secondary effects.

=== Positive ===
Positive externalities resulting from the production of artificial snow include positive impacts on local economies, increased opportunities for physical activity, and improved competition conditions. Furthermore, producing artificial snow allows ski resorts to extend the amount of time that they are operational, thus increasing opportunities for people to participate in outdoor physical activities. Finally, the composition of snow produced using snow guns differs from that of natural snow, and as such provides for improved conditions for winter sports competitions. It is often favoured by professionals for being fast and "hyper-grippy" but also raises their fear of falling on it.

=== Negative ===
The most visible negative externalities resulting from snowmaking are the adverse environmental impacts. However, in addition to environmental impacts, the production of artificial snow results in significant negative cultural and social externalities. Such externalities include issues regarding land use and land rights. Many ski resorts rent out mountains and slopes from the US Forest Service, which raises questions surrounding how the land can and should be used, and who should be the arbiter of determining appropriate uses.

A specific example of a negative cultural externality is the contention surrounding use of artificial snow at Arizona Snowbowl, a ski resort in Northern Arizona. Arizona Snowbowl is situated in the San Francisco peaks, which are one of the holiest sites for various Native American tribes in the Four Corners area, including the Navajo Nation. In 2004, Arizona Snowbowl was renting its slopes from the US Forest Service, and was looking to build new ski slopes and increase the production of artificial snow. The proposed project would involve the clearing of approximately 74 acres (30 ha) of forest, the use of reclaimed water to produce artificial snow, the construction of a three-acre holding pond for reclaimed water, and the installation of an underground pipeline. A group of plaintiffs made up of members from six Native American tribes and various other organizations filed a lawsuit against the US Forest Service and Arizona Snowbowl. Plaintiffs alleged that undertaking such a project would significantly alter and damage the cultural and spiritual nature of the mountain. This legal challenge ultimately failed in 2009.

Some limited studies, including one on unusual cases of ALS in a French ski village, suggested that artificial snow exposure may be a contributing toxicity factor.

== Other uses ==
In Swedish, the phrase "snow cannon" (Snökanon) is used to designate the lake-effect snow weather phenomenon. For example, if the Baltic Sea is not yet frozen in January, cold winds from Siberia may lead to significant snowfall.

== See also ==
- Artificial ski slopes
- Kern arc – optical display caused by snowgun ice crystal clouds
- Pumpable ice technology
- Snow grooming
