= Hohtälli =

Mountain in Switzerland

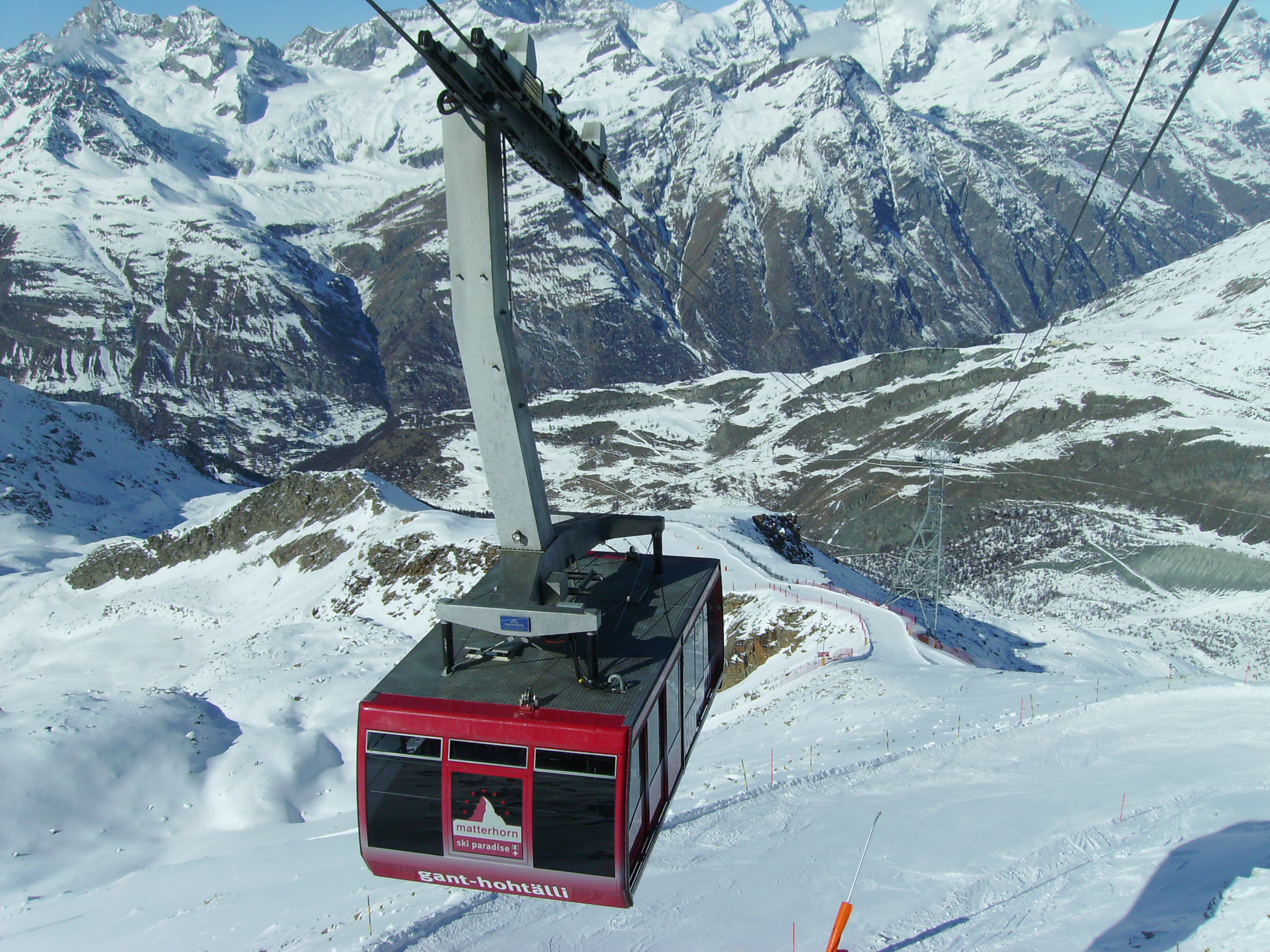
- View from the summit

Highest point
- Elevation: 3,275 m (10,745 ft)
- Prominence: 50 m (160 ft)
- Parent peak: Monte Rosa
- Coordinates: 45°59′20.5″N 7°48′9.6″E

Geography
- Location within Switzerland
- Location: Valais, Switzerland
- Parent range: Pennine Alps

The Hohtälli is a mountain of the Swiss Pennine Alps, located southeast of Zermatt in the canton of Valais. It lies on the range that separates the Findel Glacier from the Gorner Glacier, between the Gornergrat and the Stockhorn. Its summit has an elevation of 3,275 metres (10,745 ft) and includes a cable car station. The Hohtälli is part of a ski area and features several ski runs leading down the mountain. There are Cable Car connections here to Gant and a limited service Cable Car to Rote Nase.
