= Prato (Leventina) =

- Former municipality
- Flag Coat of arms
- Location of Prato (Leventina)
- Location within Switzerland Location within Canton of Ticino
- Coordinates: 46°29′N 8°45′E
- Country: Switzerland
- Canton: Ticino
- District: Leventina

Government
  - Mayor: Sindaco

Area
  - Total: 16.9 km^{2} (6.5 sq mi)
- Elevation: 1,043 m (3,422 ft)

Population (December 2004)
  - Total: 428
  - Density: 25.3/km^{2} (65.6/sq mi)
- Time zone: UTC+01:00 (CET)
  - Summer (DST): UTC+02:00 (CEST)
- Postal code: 6773
- SFOS number: 5078
- ISO 3166 code: CH-TI
- Localities: Fiesso, Mascengo, Morasco, Rodi
- Surrounded by: Dalpe, Lavizzara, Osco, Quinto
- Website: pratoleventina.ch

Prato (Leventina) is a former municipality in the district of Leventina in the canton of Ticino in Switzerland. On 6 April 2025, it merged into the municipality of Quinto.

== History ==
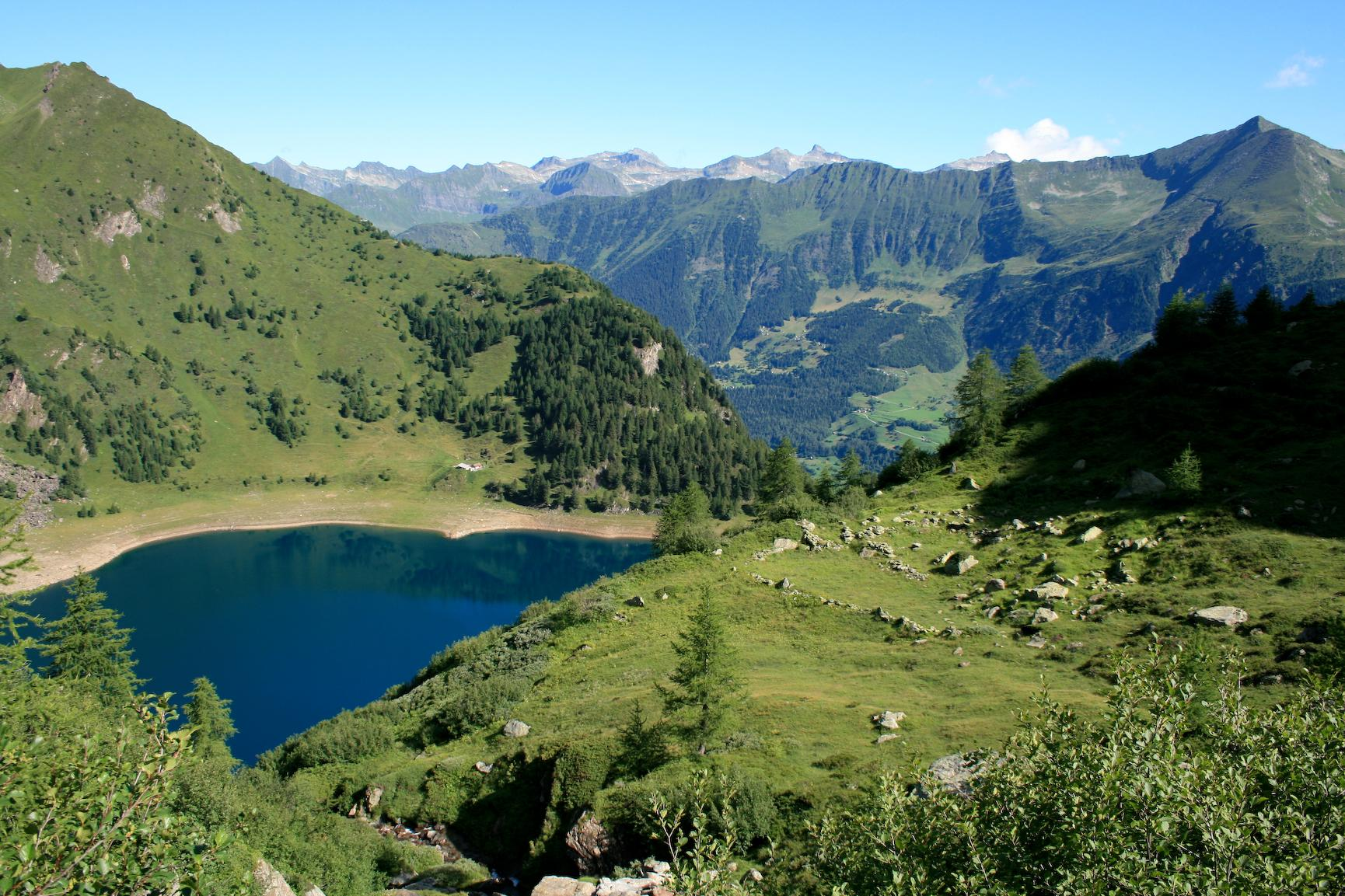
Lake Tremorgio

Prato (Leventina) is first mentioned in 1211 as de Prato. In German it used to be known as Pratt, though this name is no longer used. Between 1902 and 1939 it was known as Prato-Fiesso. The village may have grown up around a Sust (an alpine warehouse and administrative center) along the Gotthard road. The village was the center of a Vicinanza which consisted of the Degagne of Prato, Fiesso and until 1866, Dalpe. The villages played an important part in the organization of the mule traders that traveled over the passes. They retained a leading role until 1820, when the first cantonal road was built over the pass. In 1561, the Dazio Grande was built in Rodi. It was used until 1834 used as a customs house and also as a Sust. The same foundation of the building was used in 1999 for a cultural center.

The parish church of San Giorgio is first mentioned in 1210. The church has a romanesque tower and stucco from the 17th Century. It was renovated in the 1950s.

Traditionally, the local economy relied grazing. However, in the past century, the village has become a popular summer and winter tourist destination. In the hamlet of Rodi is the Tremorgio power plant (1918–26), and a cable car, built in 1928, that connects the valley with Lago Tremorgio. In 2005 two thirds of jobs in the municipality were in industry and a quarter were in the services sectors. In 2000, over half the labor force commutes.

== Geography ==
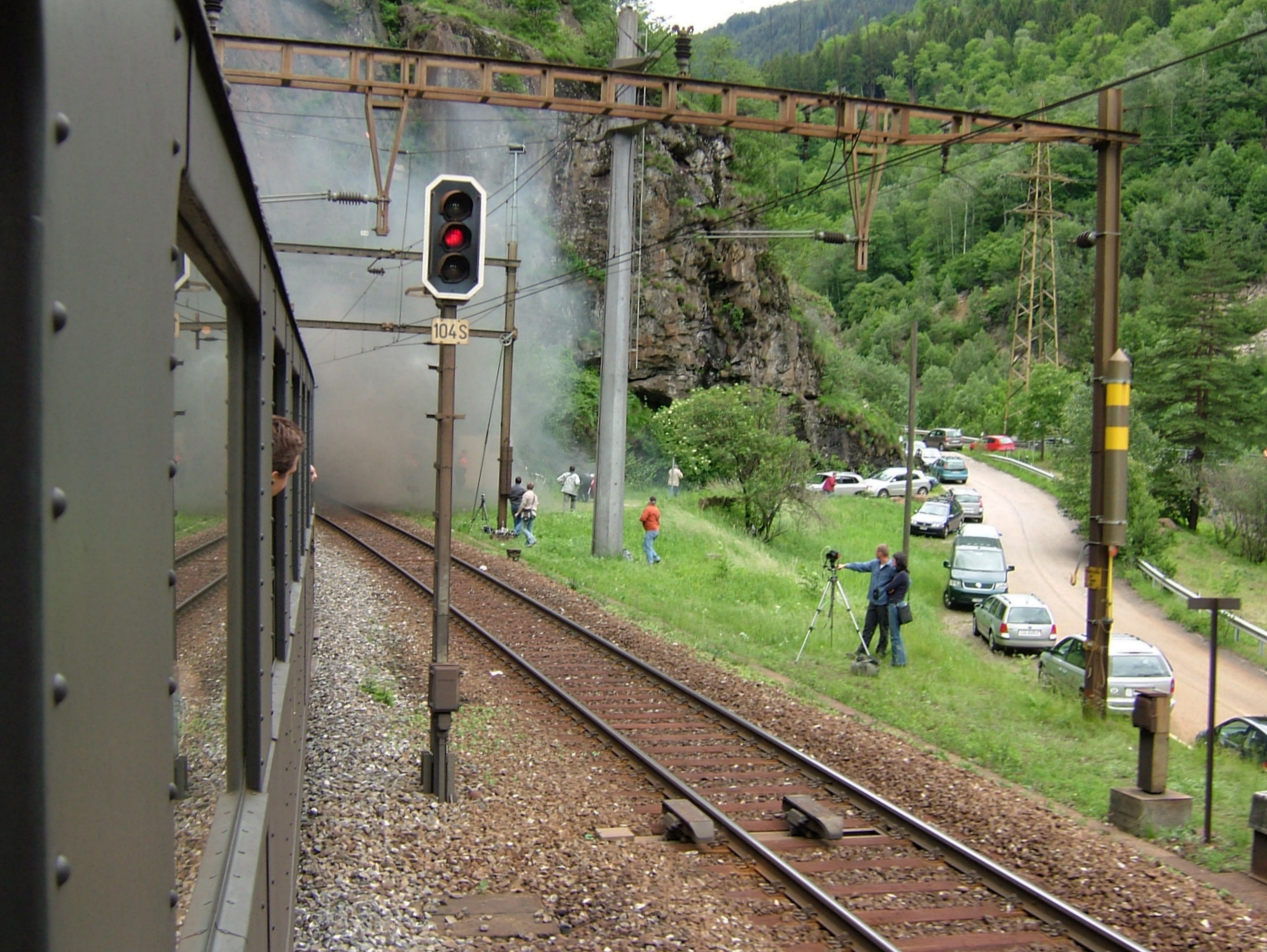
Train between Faido and Airolo just before entering the Prato (Leventina) Spiral Tunnel

Prato (Leventina) has an area, as of 1997, of 16.85 square kilometers (6.51 sq mi). Of this area, 1.06 km^{2} (0.41 sq mi) or 6.3% is used for agricultural purposes, while 7.9 km^{2} (3.1 sq mi) or 46.9% is forested. Of the rest of the land, 0.49 km^{2} (0.19 sq mi) or 2.9% is settled (buildings or roads), 0.53 km^{2} (0.20 sq mi) or 3.1% is either rivers or lakes and 4.91 km^{2} (1.90 sq mi) or 29.1% is unproductive land.

Of the built up area, housing and buildings made up 0.9% and transportation infrastructure made up 1.1%. Out of the forested land, 34.2% of the total land area is heavily forested, while 10.4% is covered in small trees and shrubbery and 2.3% is covered with orchards or small clusters of trees. Of the agricultural land, 5.3% is used for growing crops. Of the water in the municipality, 2.4% is in lakes and 0.8% is in rivers and streams. Of the unproductive areas, 15.0% is unproductive vegetation and 14.2% is too rocky for vegetation.

The municipality is located in the Leventina district, in a depression in the mountains at an elevation of 1,046 m (3,432 ft) near the Monte Piottino gorge. It consists of the village of Prato and the hamlets of Fiesso, Mascengo, Rodi and Morasco.

== Coat of arms ==
The blazon of the municipal coat of arms is Azure two dogs Argent rampant reguardant gorged Or holding together a fleur de lis of the last and a chief Argent, overall a chief Gules a cross Argent.

== Demographics ==
Prato (Leventina) has a population (as of December 2020) of 388. As of 2008, 26.2% of the population are resident foreign nationals. Over the last 10 years (1997–2007) the population has changed at a rate of 6.8%.

Most of the population (as of 2000) speaks Italian (85.1%), with Serbo-Croatian being second most common ( 6.8%) and Macedonian being third ( 3.0%). Of the Swiss national languages (as of 2000), eight speak German, one person speaks French, and 338 people speak Italian. The remainder (50 people) speak another language.

As of 2008, the gender distribution of the population was 51.4% male and 48.6% female. The population was made up of 163 Swiss men (36.1% of the population), and 69 (15.3%) non-Swiss men. There were 175 Swiss women (38.8%), and 44 (9.8%) non-Swiss women.

In 2008, there were seven live births to Swiss citizens and two births to non-Swiss citizens, and in same time span there were five xeaths of Swiss citizens. Ignoring immigration and emigration, the population of Swiss citizens increased by two while the foreign population increased by two. At the same time, there was onsnon-Swiss man and two non-Swiss women who immigrated from another country to Switzerland. The total Swiss population change in 2008 (from all sources) was a decrease of teo and the non-Swiss population change was an increase of four people. This represents a population growth rate of 0.4%.

The age distribution, as of 2009, in Prato (Leventina) is: 46 children or 10.2% of the population are between 0 and 9 years old and 38 teenagers or 8.4% are between 10 and 19. Of the adult population, 71 people or 15.7% of the population are between 20 and 29 years old. 49 people or 10.9% are between 30 and 39, 61 people or 13.5% are between 40 and 49, and 65 people or 14.4% are between 50 and 59. The senior population distribution is 55 people or 12.2% of the population are between 60 and 69 years old, 38 people or 8.4% are between 70 and 79, there are 28 people or 6.2% who are over 80.

As of 2000, there were 166 private households in the municipality, and an average of 2.4 persons per household. In 2000 there were 204 single family homes (or 77.6% of the total) out of a total of 263 inhabited buildings. There were 42 two family buildings (16.0%) and 10 multi-family buildings (3.8%). There were also 7 buildings in the municipality that were multipurpose buildings (used for both housing and commercial or another purpose).

The vacancy rate for the municipality, in 2008, was 0.84%. In 2000 there were 340 apartments in the municipality. The most common apartment size was the 5 room apartment of which there were 106. There were 16 single room apartments and 106 apartments with five or more rooms. Of these apartments, a total of 166 apartments (48.8% of the total) were permanently occupied, while 164 apartments (48.2%) were seasonally occupied and 10 apartments (2.9%) were empty. As of 2007, the construction rate of new housing units was 2.2 new units per 1000 residents.

The historical population is given in the following table:

year	population
1602	224
1639	191
1745	308
1850	424
1900	327
1950	306
2000	397

== Heritage sites of national significance ==
The Dazio Vecchio is listed as a Swiss heritage site of national significance.

== Politics ==
In the 2007 federal election, the most popular party was the FDP which received 27.09% of the vote. The next three most popular parties were the CVP (24.28%), the Ticino League (23.34%) and the SP (14.25%). In the federal election, a total of 163 votes were cast, and the voter turnout was 56.8%.

In the 2007 Gran Consiglio election, there were a total of 296 registered voters in Prato (Leventina), of which 224 or 75.7% voted. Two blank ballots were cast, leaving 222 valid ballots in the election. The most popular party was the PLRT which received 62 or 27.9% of the vote. The next three most popular parties were; the PPD+GenGiova (with 53 or 23.9%), the LEGA (with 31 or 14.0%) and the LEGA (with 31 or 14.0%).

In the 2007 Consiglio di Stato election, three blank ballots were cast, leaving 221 valid ballots in the election. The most popular party was the PLRT which received 57 or 25.8% of the vote. The next three most popular parties were; the LEGA (with 56 or 25.3%), the PPD (with 52 or 23.5%) and the SSI (with 27 or 12.2%).

== Economy ==
As of 2007, Prato (Leventina) had an unemployment rate of 2.42%. As of 2005, there were 10 people employed in the primary economic sector and about five businesses involved in this sector. 100 people were employed in the secondary sector and there were 11 businesses in this sector. 41 people were employed in the tertiary sector, with 16 businesses in this sector. There were 202 residents of the municipality who were employed in some capacity, of which females made up 39.1% of the workforce.

In 2000, there were 16 workers who commuted into the municipality and 114 workers who commuted away. The municipality is a net exporter of workers, with about 7.1 workers leaving the municipality for every one entering. Of the working population, 6.4% used public transportation to get to work, and 58.9% used a private car. As of 2009, there were 3 hotels in Prato (Leventina) with a total of 23 rooms and 54 beds.

== Religion ==
From the 2000 census, 308 or 77.6% were Roman Catholic, while 11 or 2.8% belonged to the Swiss Reformed Church. There are 62 individuals (or about 15.62% of the population) who belong to another church (not listed on the census), and 16 individuals (or about 4.03% of the population) did not answer the question.

== Education ==
In Prato (Leventina), about 59.6% of the population (between age 25-64) have completed either non-mandatory upper secondary education or additional higher education (either university or a Fachhochschule).

In Prato (Leventina), there were a total of 68 students (as of 2009). The Ticino education system provides up to three years of non-mandatory kindergarten and in Prato (Leventina) there were 12 children in kindergarten. The primary school program lasts for five years and includes both a standard school and a special school. In the municipality, 20 students attended the standard primary schools and two students attended the special school. In the lower secondary school system, students either attend a two-year middle school followed by a two-year pre-apprenticeship or they attend a four-year program to prepare for higher education. There were 18 students in the two-year middle school and 0 in their pre-apprenticeship, while three students were in the four-year advanced program.

The upper secondary school includes several options, but at the end of the upper secondary program, a student will be prepared to enter a trade or to continue on to a university or college. In Ticino, vocational students may either attend school while working on their internship or apprenticeship (which takes three or four years) or may attend school followed by an internship or apprenticeship (which takes one year as a full-time student or one and a half to two years as a part-time student). There were five vocational students who were attending school full-time and 8 who attend part-time.

As of 2000, there were 13 students from Prato (Leventina) who attended schools outside the municipality.

== Notable people ==
- Michela Figini, Olympic gold medalist 1984 and world champion 1985 in downhill, born 1966
