= Parsenn Funicular =

Funicular railway in Davos, Switzerland

Coordinates: 46.8231°N 9.8196°E

Parsennbahn
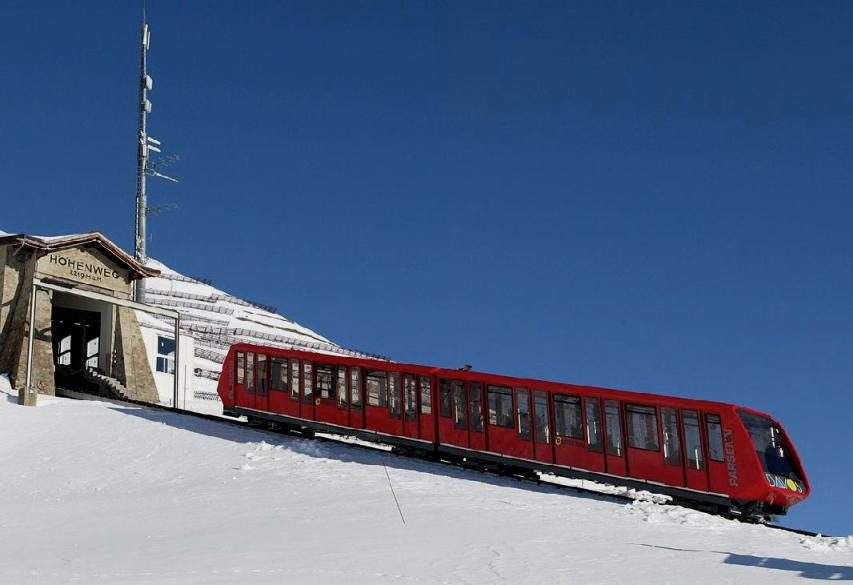
- Lower section train approaching Höhenweg (2007)

Overview
- Other names: Davos-Parsenn-Bahn; Drahtseilbahn Davos-Parsenn
- Status: In operation
- Owner: Davos Klosters Bergbahnen AG (since 2003); AG Drahtseilbahn Davos-Parsenn (D.P.B.) (1931–‥, name change); AG Davos-Parsenn-Bahnen (DPB) (‥–2003)
- Locale: Davos, Switzerland
- Termini: Davos Dorf; Weissfluhjoch
- Stations: 3 (2 each, sections meet at Höhenweg)

Service
- Type: funicular railway, 2 sections
- Operator(s): Davos Klosters Bergbahnen AG
- Rolling stock: 2 each section

History
- Opened: 17 December 1931; 93 years ago (1st section)

Technical
- Track length: 4,048 metres (13,281 ft)
- Number of tracks: 1 with passing loops
- Track gauge: 1,200 mm (3 ft 11 1/4 in); 800 mm (2 ft 7 1/2 in)
- Electrification: from opening
- Operating speed: 10 metres per second (33 ft/s); 6.2 metres per second (20 ft/s)
- Highest elevation: 2,665 m (8,743 ft)
- Maximum incline: 47.7%

Transitmap of the Parsennbahn.

The Parsenn Funicular (German: Davos Parsenn Bahn, DPB) is a funicular railway in the resort of Davos in the Swiss canton of Graubünden. The line links the town of Davos with the Weissfluhjoch ridge and the Parsenn ski area.

The funicular is composed of two separate and independent sections, with an interchange station between the two at Höhenweg. The lowest station (Davos DKB) lies at an elevation of 1,560 metres (5,120 ft) and the highest (Weissfluhjoch DKB) lies at an elevation of 2,665 metres (8,743 ft). The highest section is the highest open-air funicular in Switzerland and the second highest after the Metro Alpin.

Considering both sections, which have a total length of 4,048 metres (13,281 ft), the line is also one of the longest in the country.

The funicular is operated by Davos Klosters Bergbahnen AG.

== History ==
The funicular opened in December 1931, to access the Weissfluhjoch ski area. The lower section was renovated with two new cars in December 2002, With the upper section being renovated in 2010.

== Operation ==
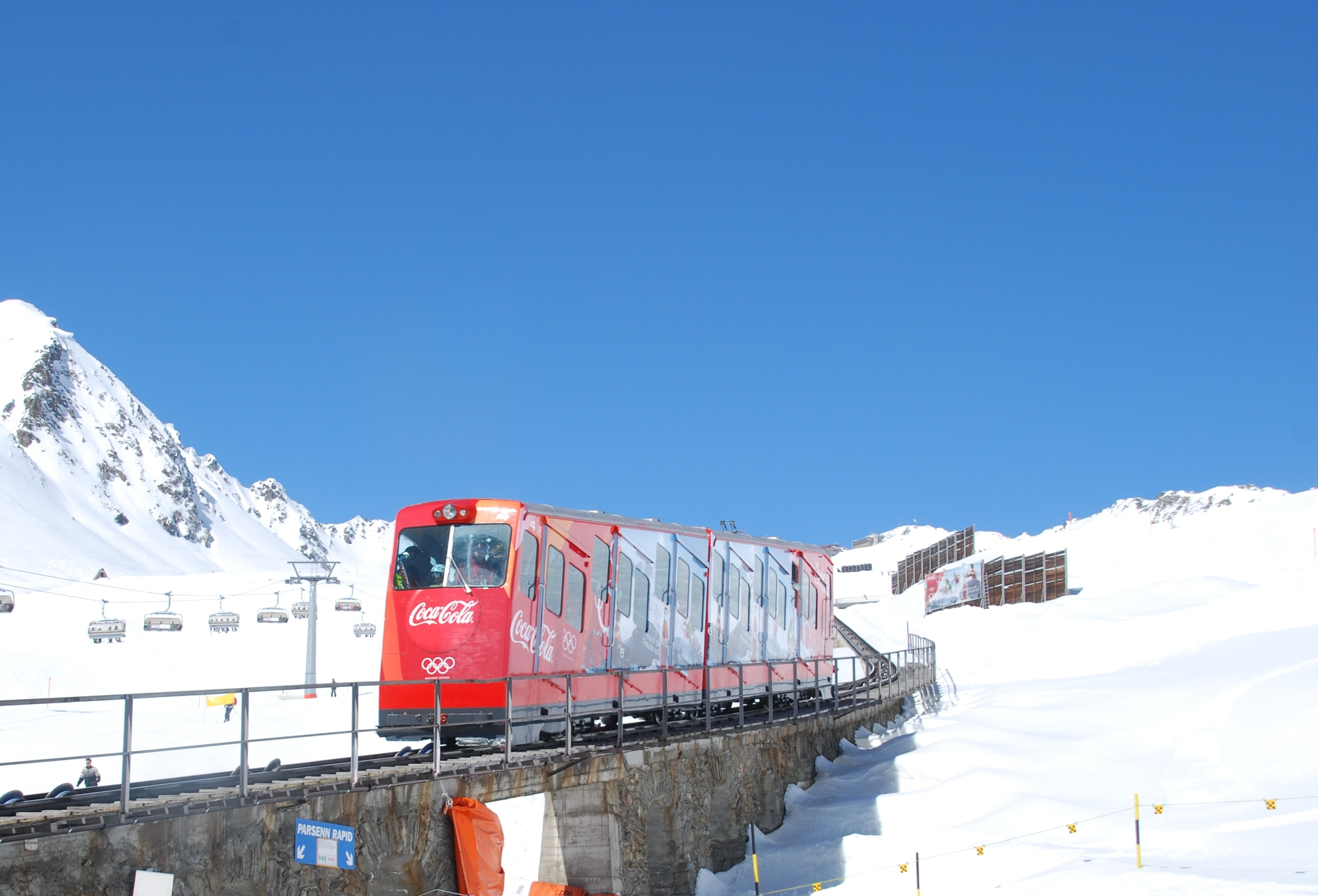
Previous upper section train

The line has the following parameters:

Feature	Lower section	Upper section
Number of cars	2x2 car train sets	2x2 car train sets
Number of stops	2	2
Configuration	Single track with passing loop	Single track with passing loop
Track length	1,860 metres (6,100 ft)	2,188 metres (7,178 ft)
Rise	662 metres (2,172 ft)	444 metres (1,457 ft)
Maximum gradient	47,7%	33%
Track gauge	1,200 mm (3 ft 11 1/4 in)	800 mm (2 ft 7 1/2 in)
Capacity	200 passengers per train set	170 passengers per train set
Maximum speed	10 metres per second (33 ft/s)	6.2 metres per second (20 ft/s)
Journey time	4 minutes	10 minutes

== See also ==
- List of funicular railways
- List of funiculars in Switzerland
