= Lago del Zött =

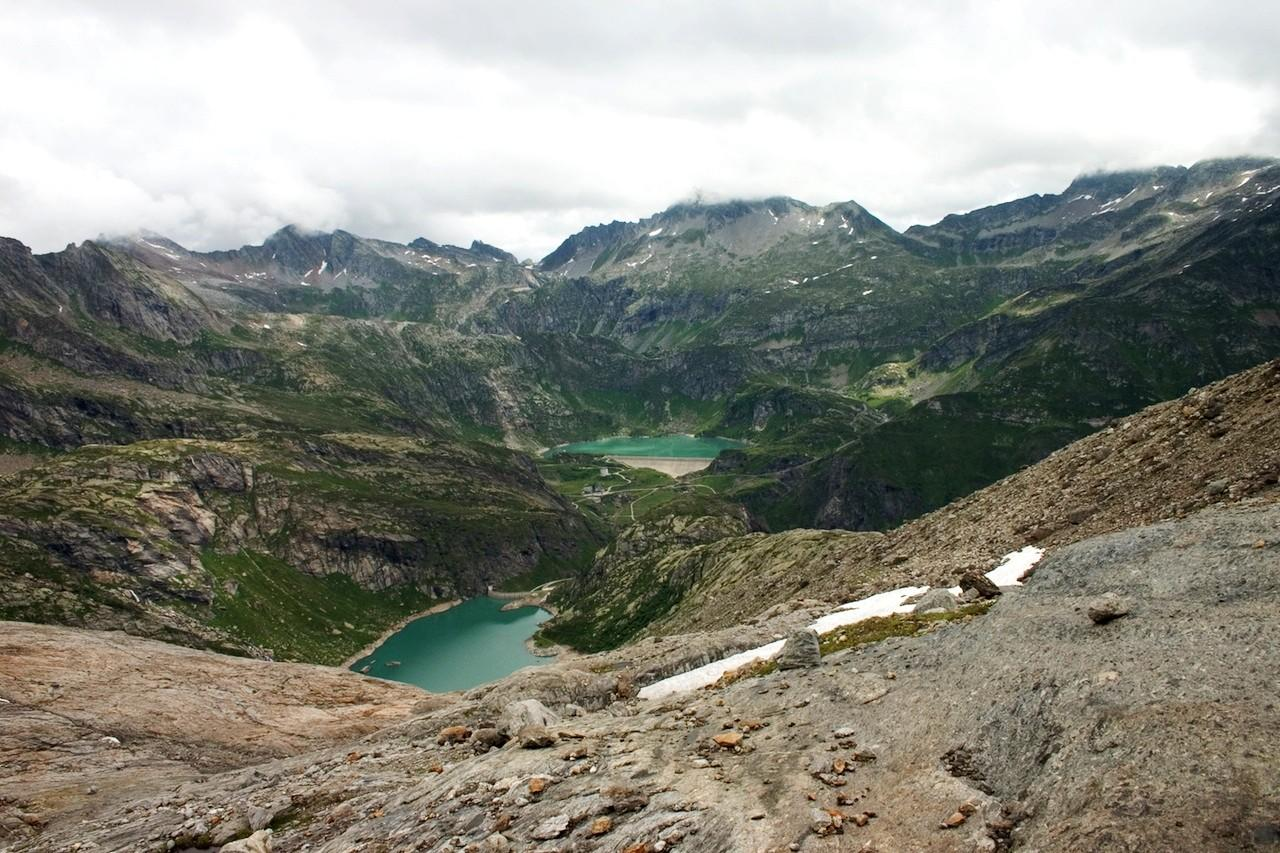
- Lago del Zött (foreground) and Lago di Robièi (background)

- Location within Canton of Ticino Location within Switzerland Location within Italy Location within Alps
- Interactive map of Lago del Zött
- Location: Ticino
- Coordinates: 46°26′N 8°30′E
- Type: reservoir
- Catchment area: 9.5 km^{2} (3.7 sq mi)
- Basin countries: Switzerland
- Surface area: 0.13 km^{2} (0.050 sq mi)
- Water volume: 1.65 million cubic metres (1,340 acre⋅ft)
- Surface elevation: 1,940 m (6,360 ft)

Lago del Zött is a reservoir in the canton of Ticino, Switzerland, with a surface area of 0.13 km². Its 36 m arch dam was completed in 1967 and holds a volume of 1.65 mio m³.

== See also ==
- List of mountain lakes of Switzerland
