= Furi, Switzerland =

Alpine hamlet in Switzerland

Coordinates: 46°00′05″N 7°43′56″E

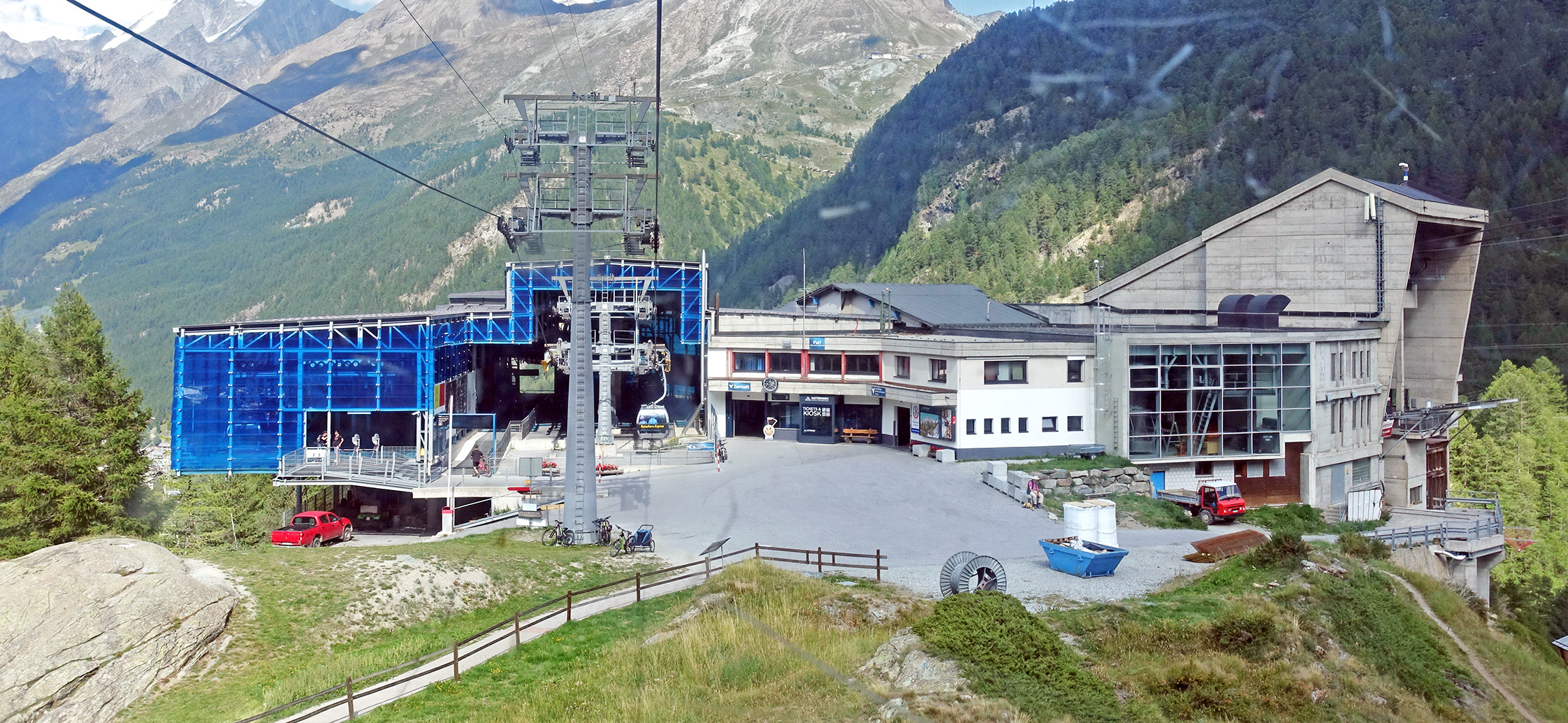
Furi cable car and gondola station

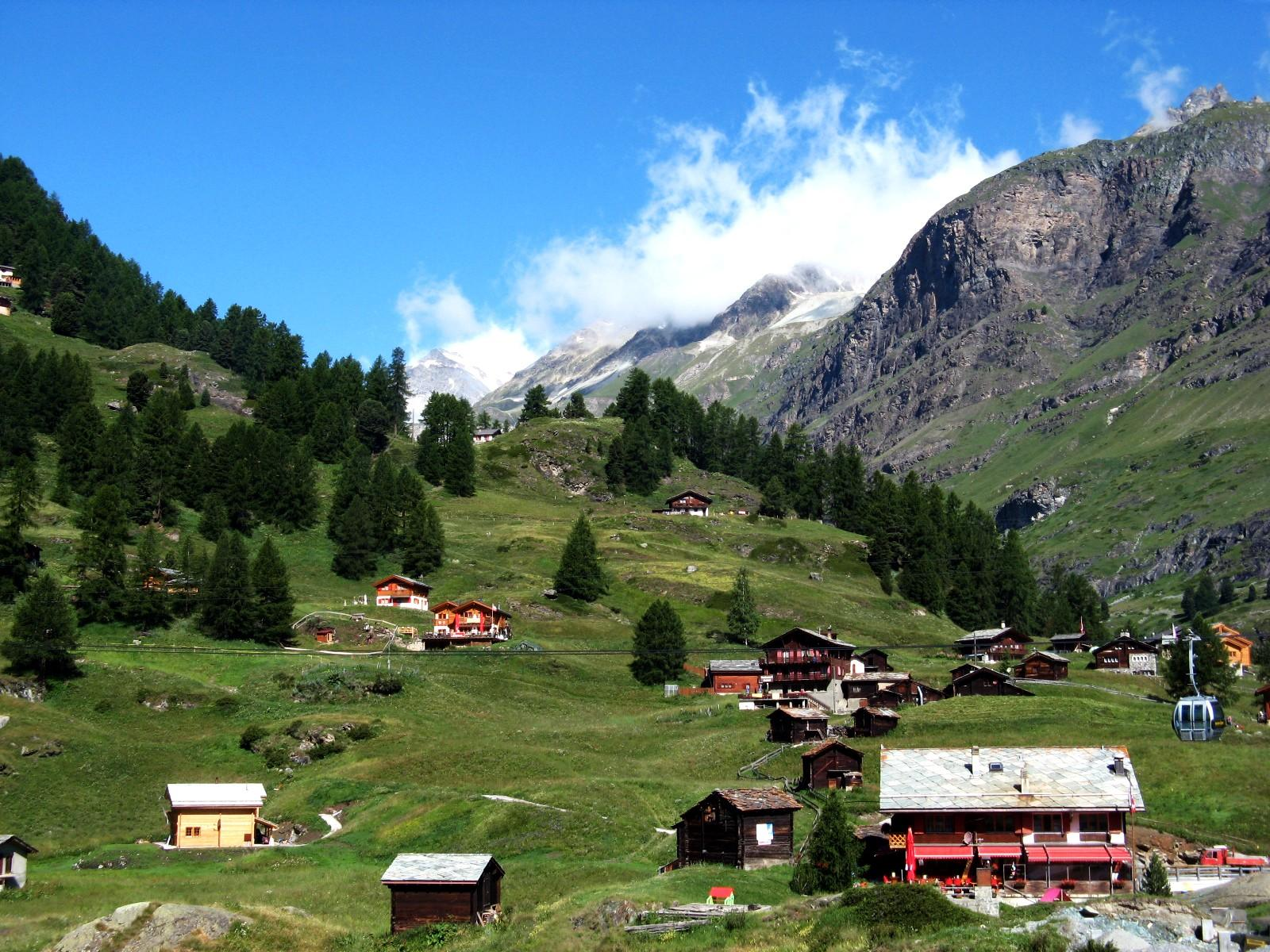
Buildings in Furi

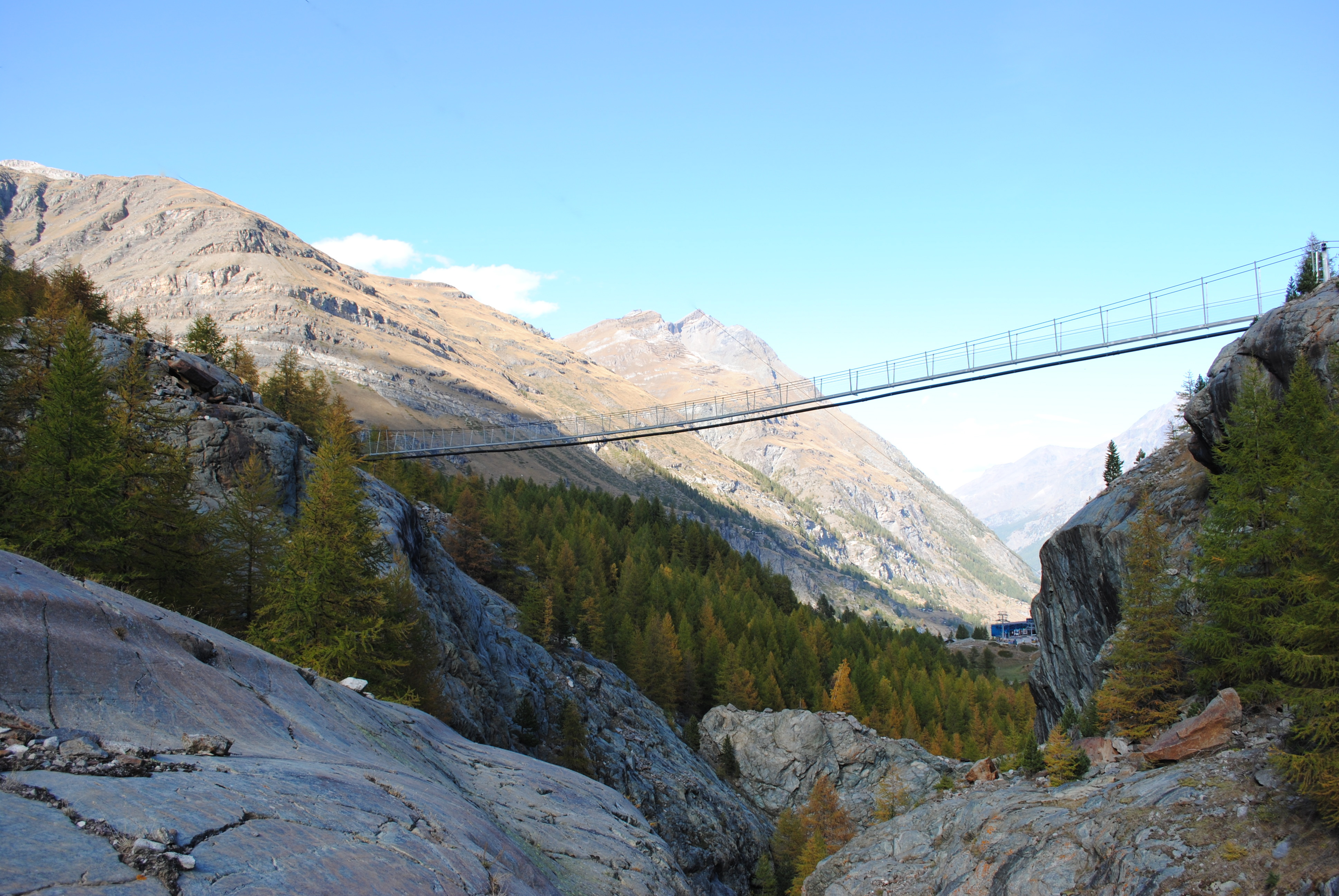
Furi suspension bridge

Furi is an alpine hamlet in the Pennine Alps, located three kilometers south of Zermatt, Switzerland at an altitude of 1,687m. It is located on a relatively flat area of land between the Gornera and Zmuttbach rivers.

Furi has been connected to Zermatt by cable car since the 1950s and is now also connected by a gondola lift. The largest lift junction in the area, cable cars and gondolas travel to Riffelberg, Schwarzsee, Trockener Steg and the Klein Matterhorn. The cable car to Furgg was dismantled in 2003.

Located 700 metres South of Furi above the Gornera river is the Furi suspension bridge, which allows access to the Dossen Glacier Garden.
