= Längfluh =

Mountain in Switzerland

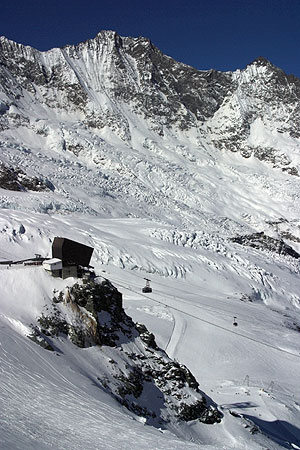
- Cable car station surrounded by the Fee Glacier

Highest point
- Elevation: 2,869 m (9,413 ft)
- Coordinates: 46°5′4.3″N 7°53′44.4″E

Geography
- Location within Switzerland
- Location: Valais, Switzerland
- Parent range: Pennine Alps

The Längfluh (also spelled Längflue) is a rocky outcrop of the Pennine Alps, dividing the Fee Glacier above Saas Fee in the canton of Valais.

The Längfluh is accessible by cable car and is part of a ski area.
