= Rote Nase =

Mountain in Switzerland

- Location within Switzerland

Highest point
- Elevation: 3,251 m (10,666 ft)
- Coordinates: 45°59′12″N 7°48′40″E

Geography
- Location: Valais, Switzerland
- Parent range: Pennine Alps

The Rote Nase (German for "Red Nose") is a mountain of the Swiss Pennine Alps, located east of the Gornergrat in Valais. The summit is 3,251 m (10,666 ft) above sea level. It is located to the Southeast of the town of Zermatt, and features several ungroomed ski runs leading down the mountain. The summit can be accessed using a limited service cable car running from Hohtälli.

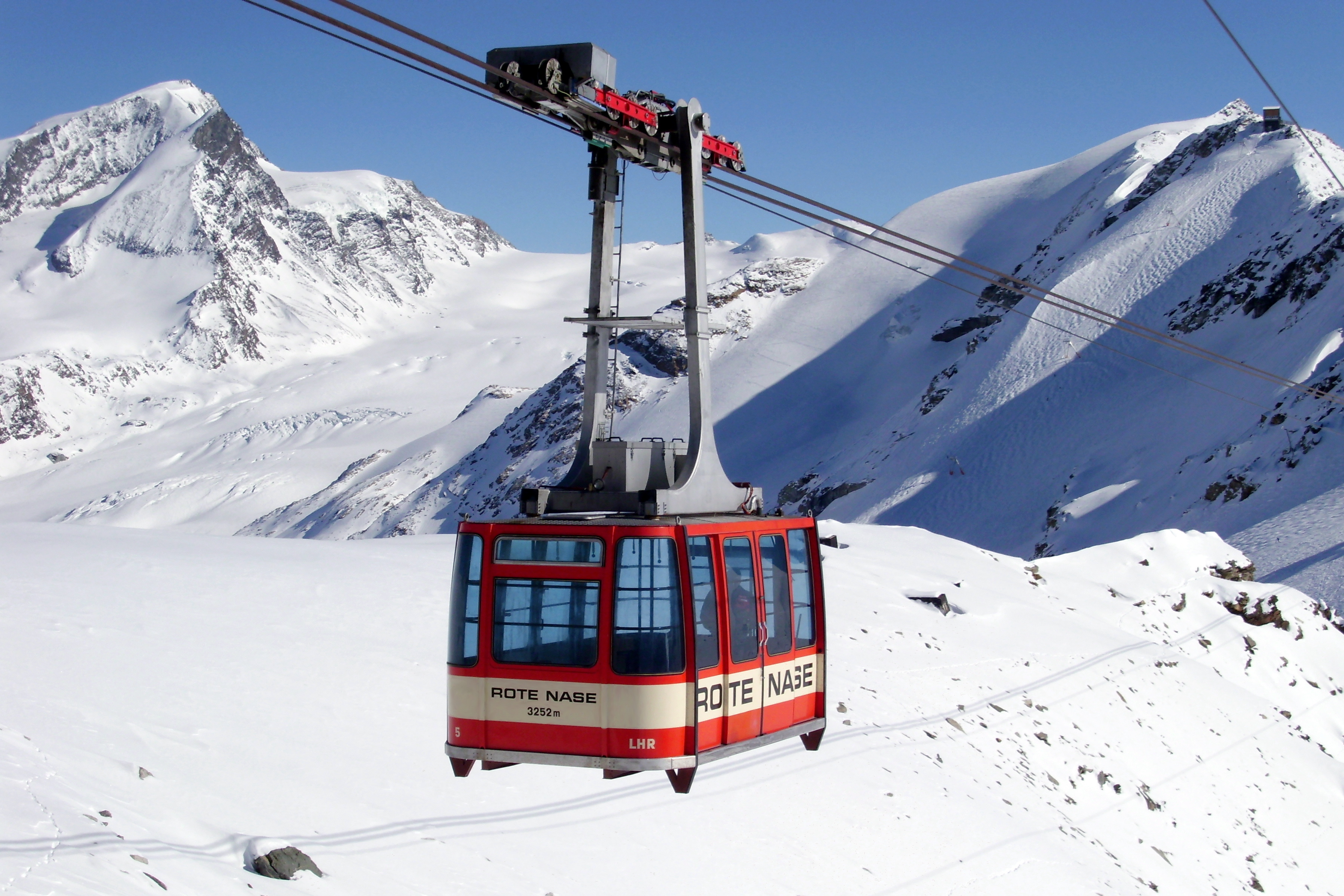
One of the Rote Nase cable cars on its way up the mountain from Hohtälli. The cable car system was built in 1986.
