= Tremorgio Lake =

Lake in Ticino, Switzerland

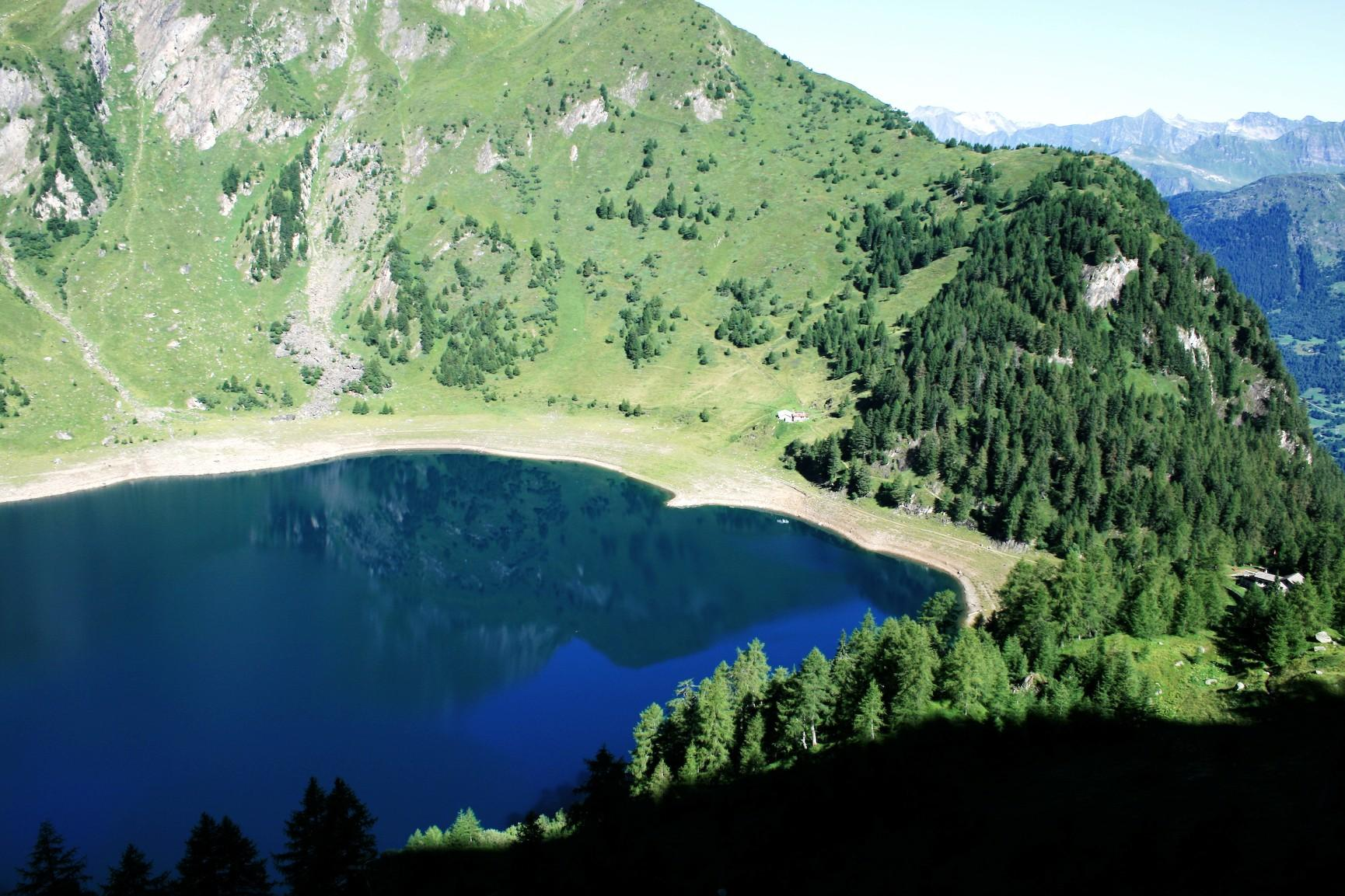

- Location within Canton of Ticino Location within Switzerland Location within Alps
- Interactive map of Tremorgio Lake
- Location: Ticino
- Coordinates: 46°28′45″N 8°43′13″E
- Basin countries: Switzerland
- Surface area: 39 ha (96 acres)
- Max. depth: 57 m (187 ft)
- Surface elevation: 1,851 m (6,073 ft)

Tremorgio Lake is a mountain lake above Rodi and Fiesso, in the municipality of Prato Leventina in the canton of Ticino, Switzerland. Its surface area is 39 ha (96 acres).

The lake can be reached by aerial cable car from Rodi.

== See also ==
- List of lakes of Switzerland
- List of mountain lakes of Switzerland
- Lepontine Alps
