= Findel Glacier =

Glacier in Switzerland

- Findelgletscher
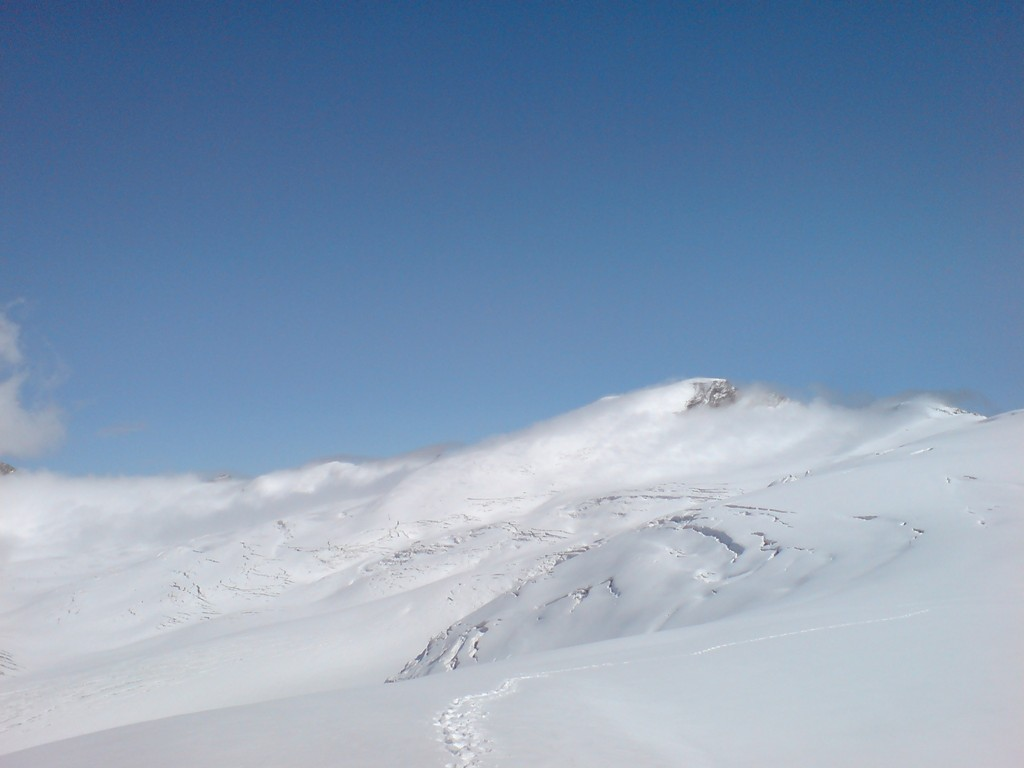
- Findelgletscher near the junction with the Gorner Glacier at the Stockhornpass

- Location within Switzerland Location within Canton of Valais Location within Alps
- Location: Valais, Switzerland
- Coordinates: 46°0′33″N 7°50′32″E
- Length: 8 km (5.0 mi)

The Findel Glacier (German: Findelgletscher) is a valley glacier in the Monte Rosa massif east of Zermatt in the Pennine Alps. It has a length of 8 km (5.0 mi) and covers an area of 19 km^{2} (7.3 sq mi).

The starting point of the Findel Glacier is on the Cima di Jazzi at 3,803 m (12,477 ft) above sea level, on the border between Switzerland and Italy. From there the glacier flows to the west between the Rimpfischhorn and Strahlhorn on the north and the Stockhorn on the south. The end of glacier tongue is located at 2,500 m (8,200 ft) above sea level.

In October 2009, a group of Swiss scientists from the University of Zurich carried out an experiment to measure the length of the glacier, comparing their results with a previous experiment in 2005. Their results showed that the glacier had lost 49 million cubic metres of ice, and has lost a quarter of its surface area since 1850.

== See also ==
- List of glaciers in Switzerland
- List of glaciers
- Retreat of glaciers since 1850
- Swiss Alps
