= Stockhorn (Zermatt) =

Mountain in Switzerland

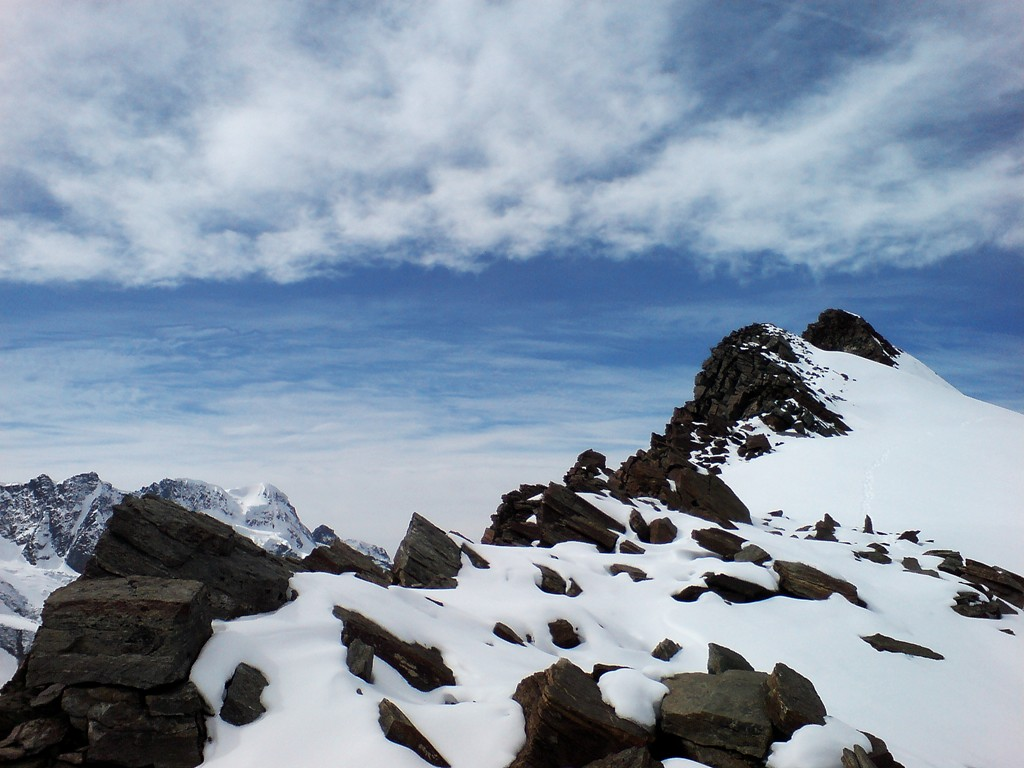
- View from the east side

Highest point
- Elevation: 3,532 m (11,588 ft)
- Prominence: 145 m (476 ft)
- Parent peak: Monte Rosa (Dufourspitze)
- Coordinates: 45°59′8″N 7°50′16″E

Geography
- Location within Switzerland
- Location: Valais, Switzerland
- Parent range: Pennine Alps

The Stockhorn (3,532 metres (11,588 ft)) is a mountain of the Swiss Pennine Alps, located to the southeast of the town of Zermatt. It lies on the range between the Findel and Gorner glaciers, east of the Gornergrat.

The Stockhorn is part of the Zermatt ski area. A now-defunct cable car station at an altitude of 3,405 metres (11,171 ft) is located west of the summit; the original aerial tramway connecting the Gornergrat to the Stockhorn via Hohtälli was dismantled in 2007.
