= Lago di Robièi =

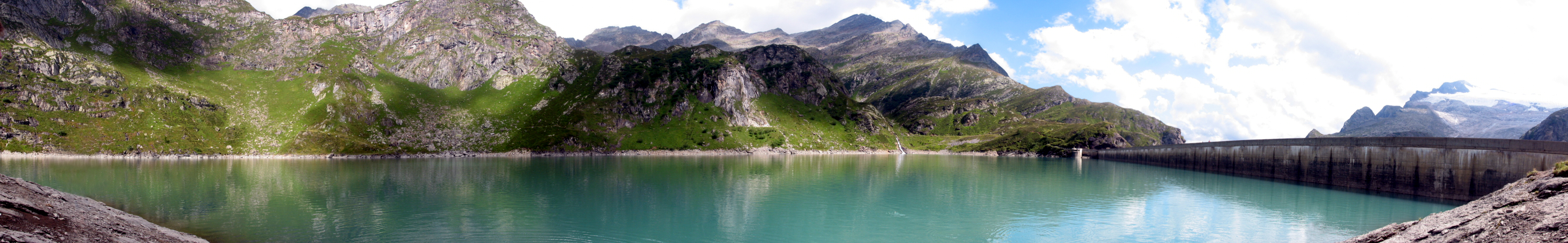

- Location within Canton of Ticino Location within Switzerland Location within Alps
- Interactive map of Lago di Robièi
- Location: Ticino
- Coordinates: 46°26′44″N 8°31′1″E
- Type: reservoir
- Catchment area: 1.52 km^{2} (0.59 sq mi)
- Basin countries: Switzerland
- Surface area: 0.24 km^{2} (0.093 sq mi)
- Max. depth: 50 m (160 ft)
- Surface elevation: 1,940 m (6,360 ft)

Lago di Robièi is a lake in Ticino, Switzerland. The reservoir has a volume of 6,700,000 cubic metres (5,400 acre⋅ft) and a surface area of 24 ha (59 acres). It is located at an elevation of 1,940 metres (6,360 ft) near Lago dei Cavagnöö and Lago del Zött.

The reservoir can be reached by following the road through the Maggia Valley to Bignasco and proceeding to San Carlo. From San Carlo, an aerial tramway leads to the dam 900 metres (3,000 ft) above.

The dam was completed in 1967.

== Climate ==
Climate data for Robièi (1898m a.s.l., Reference Period 1991–2020)
Month	Jan	Feb	Mar	Apr	May	Jun	Jul	Aug	Sep	Oct	Nov	Dec	Year
Mean daily maximum °C (°F)	−0.5 (31.1)	−0.5 (31.1)	1.8 (35.2)	4.2 (39.6)	8.1 (46.6)	12.9 (55.2)	15.3 (59.5)	15.0 (59.0)	11.1 (52.0)	7.2 (45.0)	2.5 (36.5)	0.2 (32.4)	6.4 (43.6)
Daily mean °C (°F)	−3.3 (26.1)	−3.5 (25.7)	−1.2 (29.8)	1.3 (34.3)	5.2 (41.4)	9.7 (49.5)	12.1 (53.8)	12.0 (53.6)	8.2 (46.8)	4.5 (40.1)	0.1 (32.2)	−2.5 (27.5)	3.6 (38.4)
Mean daily minimum °C (°F)	−6.1 (21.0)	−6.4 (20.5)	−4.1 (24.6)	−1.4 (29.5)	2.5 (36.5)	6.7 (44.1)	9.0 (48.2)	9.1 (48.4)	5.5 (41.9)	2.0 (35.6)	−2.3 (27.9)	−5.2 (22.6)	0.8 (33.4)
Average precipitation mm (inches)	137 (5.4)	113 (4.4)	152 (6.0)	237 (9.3)	254 (10.0)	216 (8.5)	163 (6.4)	204 (8.0)	243 (9.6)	276 (10.9)	279 (11.0)	142 (5.6)	2,416 (95.1)
Source: MeteoSwiss

== See also ==
- List of mountain lakes of Switzerland
