= Rodi (Prato Leventina) =

- Village
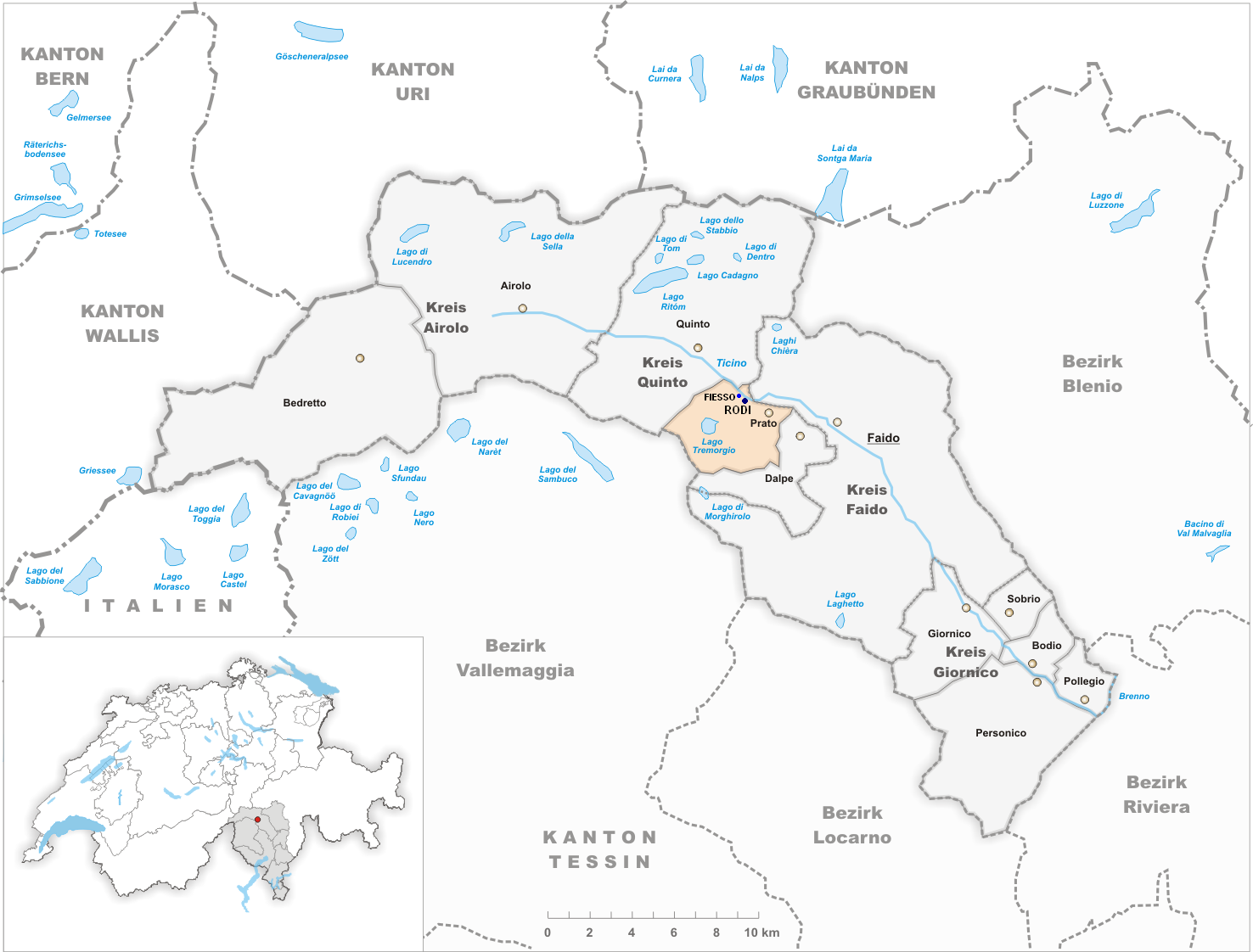
- Rodi (dark blue dot) and Fiesso (blue dot) within the municipality of Prato and Leventina district

- Rodi in Switzerland
- Coordinates: 46°29′20″N 8°44′20″E
- Country: Switzerland
- Canton: Ticino
- District: Leventina
- Municipality: Prato (Leventina)
- Elevation: 900 m (3,000 ft)
- Time zone: UTC+1 (CET)
  - Summer (DST): UTC+2 (CEST)
- Postal code: 6772
- Area code: (+41) ...
- Licence plate: TI

Rodi is a Swiss village in the municipality of Prato (Leventina), Canton of Ticino. Along with the contiguous village of Fiesso, it forms a tiny urban area named Rodi-Fiesso. In Italian, its name means "Rhodes".

== Geography ==
Aerial view (1964)

Rodi is located in the Leventina Valley, upon the southwestern shore of Ticino river and below the Lepontine Alps. It is 2 km from Prato, 6 from Faido, 50 from Bellinzona and 75 from Lugano.

On the mountain above, in south, is located Lake Tremorgio, at 1,851 amsl. In the eastern neighbourhoods of the village it is the Dazio Grande, a former custom house built in 1561.

== Transport ==
Rodi counts a train station (Rodi-Fiesso) on the Gotthard railway, linking Milan to Zürich. An aerial cable car links the village to Lake Tremorgio.

Rodi is crossed in the middle by the National Road 2 and is not too far from the A2 motorway Chiasso-Basel. Nearest A2 exit is in Quinto, 3.5 km far from it.
