= Arnisee =

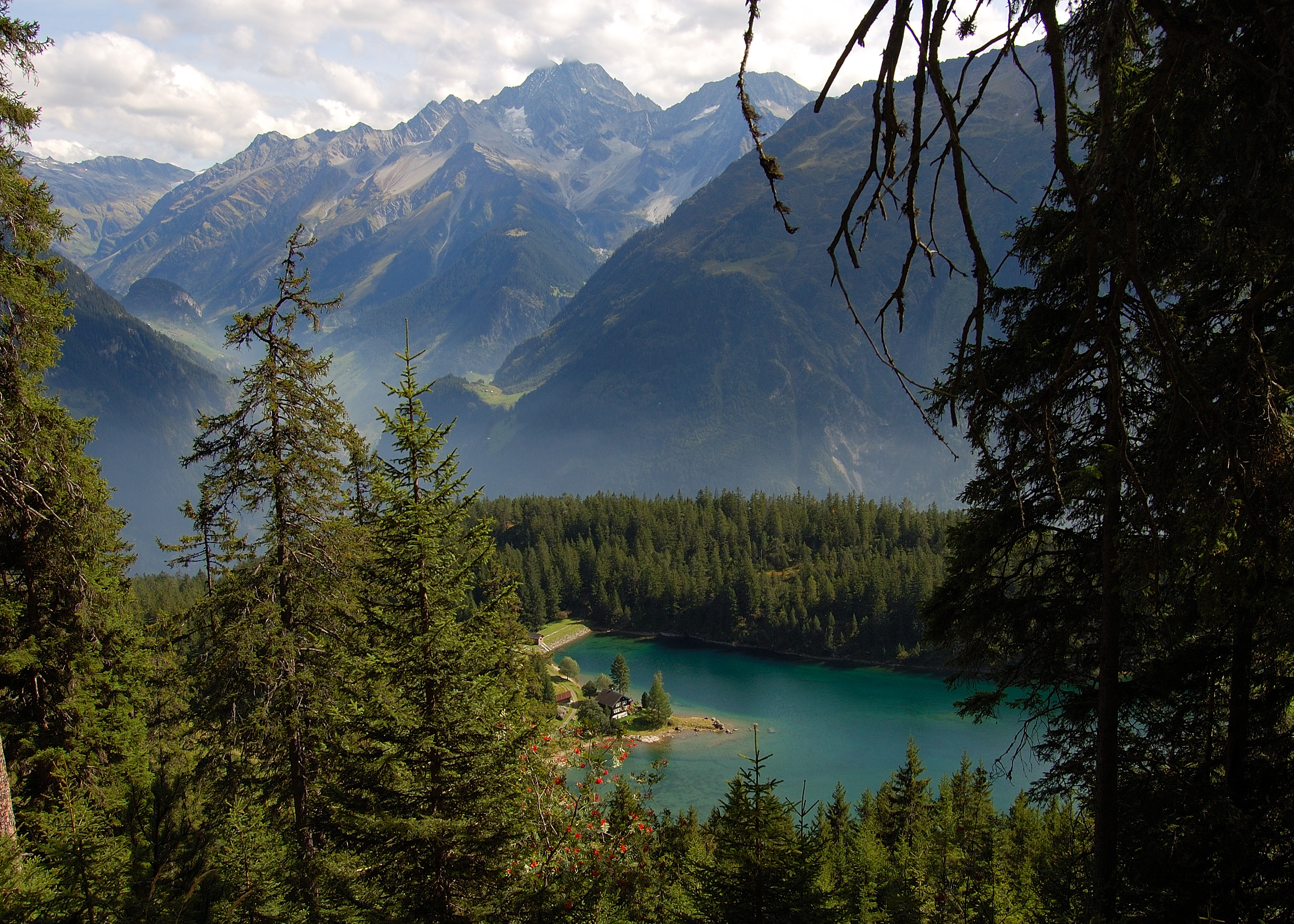

- Location within Canton of Uri Location within Switzerland Location within Alps
- Interactive map of Arnisee
- Location: Uri
- Coordinates: 46°46′22″N 8°38′29″E
- Type: reservoir
- Basin countries: Switzerland
- Surface elevation: 1,368 m (4,488 ft)

Arnisee is a reservoir in the Canton of Uri, Switzerland. It can be reached by gondola lift from Amsteg and Intschi.

== See also ==
- List of mountain lakes of Switzerland
