= Parsenn =

Ski resort in Switzerland

Coordinates: 46.84°N 9.81°E

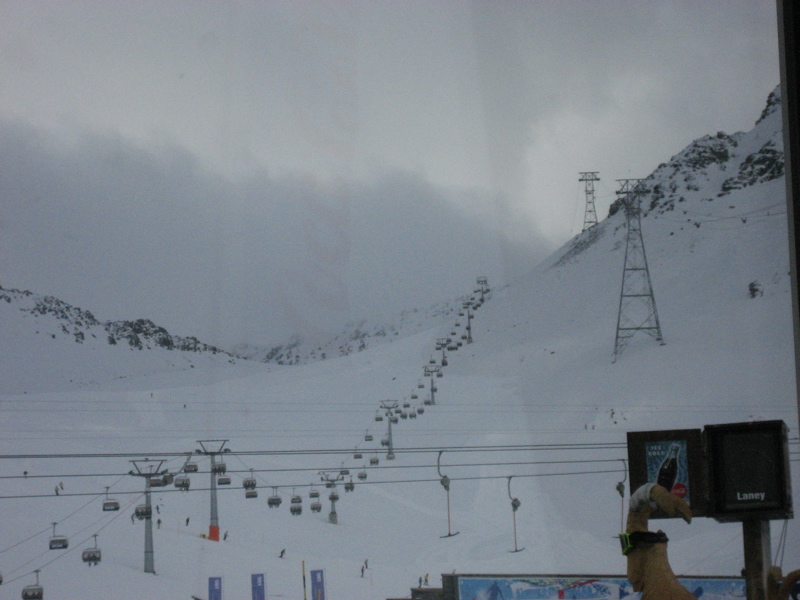
The ski slopes at Parsenn

Parsenn is a ski area near Davos, Switzerland. It offers 35 ski runs.

The Parsenn area is the largest and most modern of Davos' five mountains.

The recently updated Parsenn "red railway" funicular covers the difference of 1,100 metres (3,609 ft) up to the Weissfluhjoch ridge. One can also get from Klosters to Gotschna/Parsenn with a large cable car which runs from here run up to 17 kilometres (10.6 mi) into the Prättigau valley.
