= Chrüzli Pass =

Mountain pass in Switzerland

Chrüzlipass
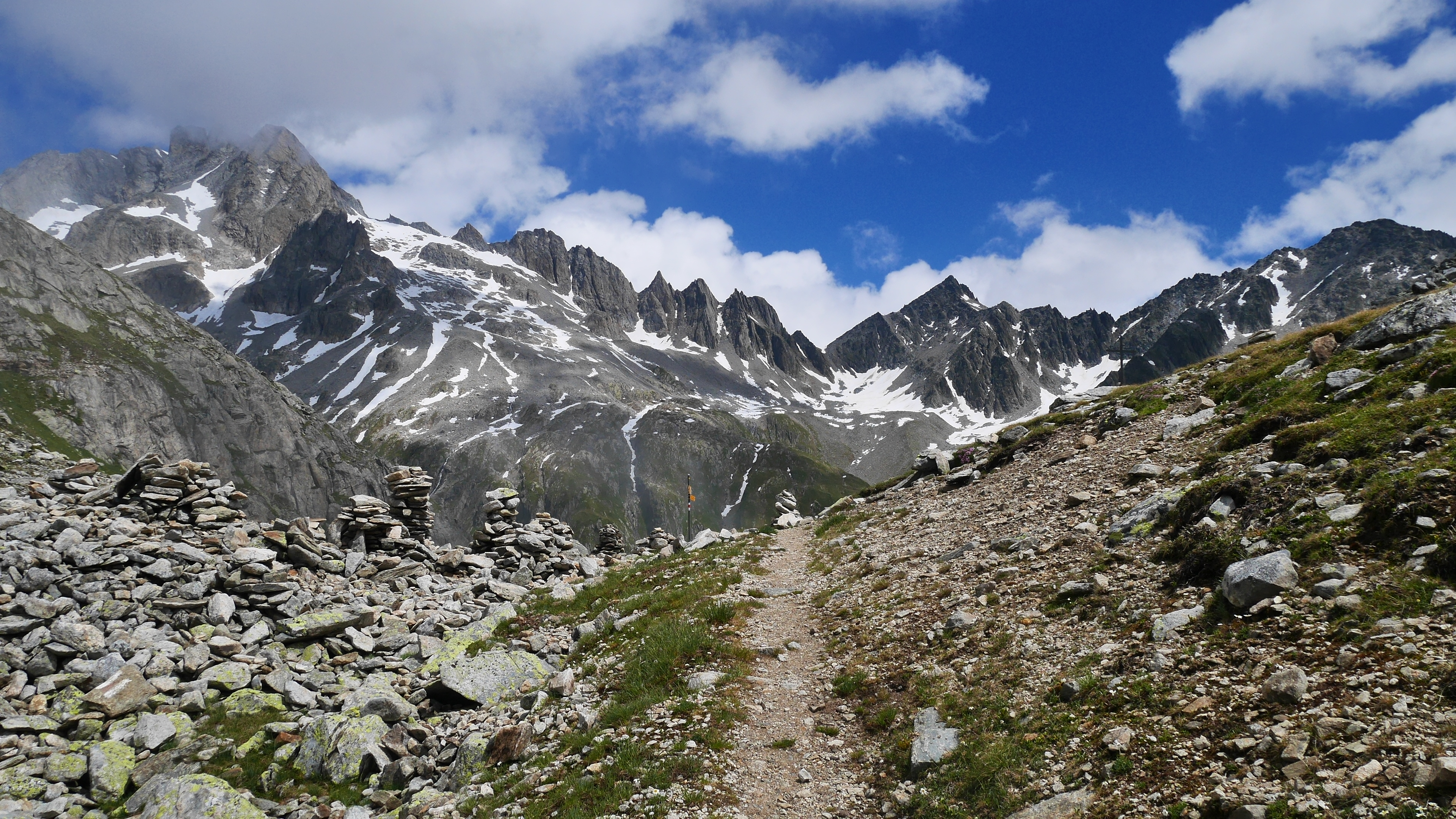
- View from the summit of the pass

- Location within Switzerland
- Elevation: 2,346 metres (7,697 ft)
- Traversed by: Trail

Third Approach
- Location: Uri/Graubünden, Switzerland
- Range: Glarus Alps
- Coordinates: 46°43′21″N 08°44′54″E
- Topo map: Swiss Federal Office of Topography swisstopo

The Chrüzli Pass (2,346 m (7,697 ft), Swiss German for Small Cross (as a diminutive) Pass) is a historic high mountain pass of the Glarus Alps, located on the border between the Swiss cantons of Uri and Graubünden (GR). It is also known as the Kreuzli Pass or Chrüxli Pass. It connects the Maderanertal (UR) and the Tujetsch (e.g. Sedrun) in Surselva (GR). It is one of the lowest passes between the two cantons and is traversed by a trail.

The pass is overlooked by the Witenalpstock and the Chrüzlistock.

Below the Chrüzlipass, or more precisely between it and the Chrüzlistock, runs the Gotthard Base Tunnel.
