= Passo Predèlp =

- Location within Switzerland
- Elevation: 2,449 metres (8,035 ft)
- Traversed by: Trail

Third Approach
- Location: Ticino, Switzerland
- Range: Lepontine Alps
- Coordinates: 46°31′19″N 08°47′45″E
- Topo map: Swiss Federal Office of Topography swisstopo

The Passo di Predèlp (2,449 m (8,035 ft), is a high mountain pass of the Lepontine Alps (Saint-Gotthard Massif), located between the Valle Santa Maria and the Leventina, in Ticino.

The pass lies between Pizzo del Sole and Pizzo di Predèlp. It connects Carì (above Faido) with other passes in the Lukmanier region.

Below the Passo Predèlp, or more precisely just west of it, runs the Gotthard Base Tunnel.
