= Pizzo dell'Uomo =

Mountain of the Lepontine Alps

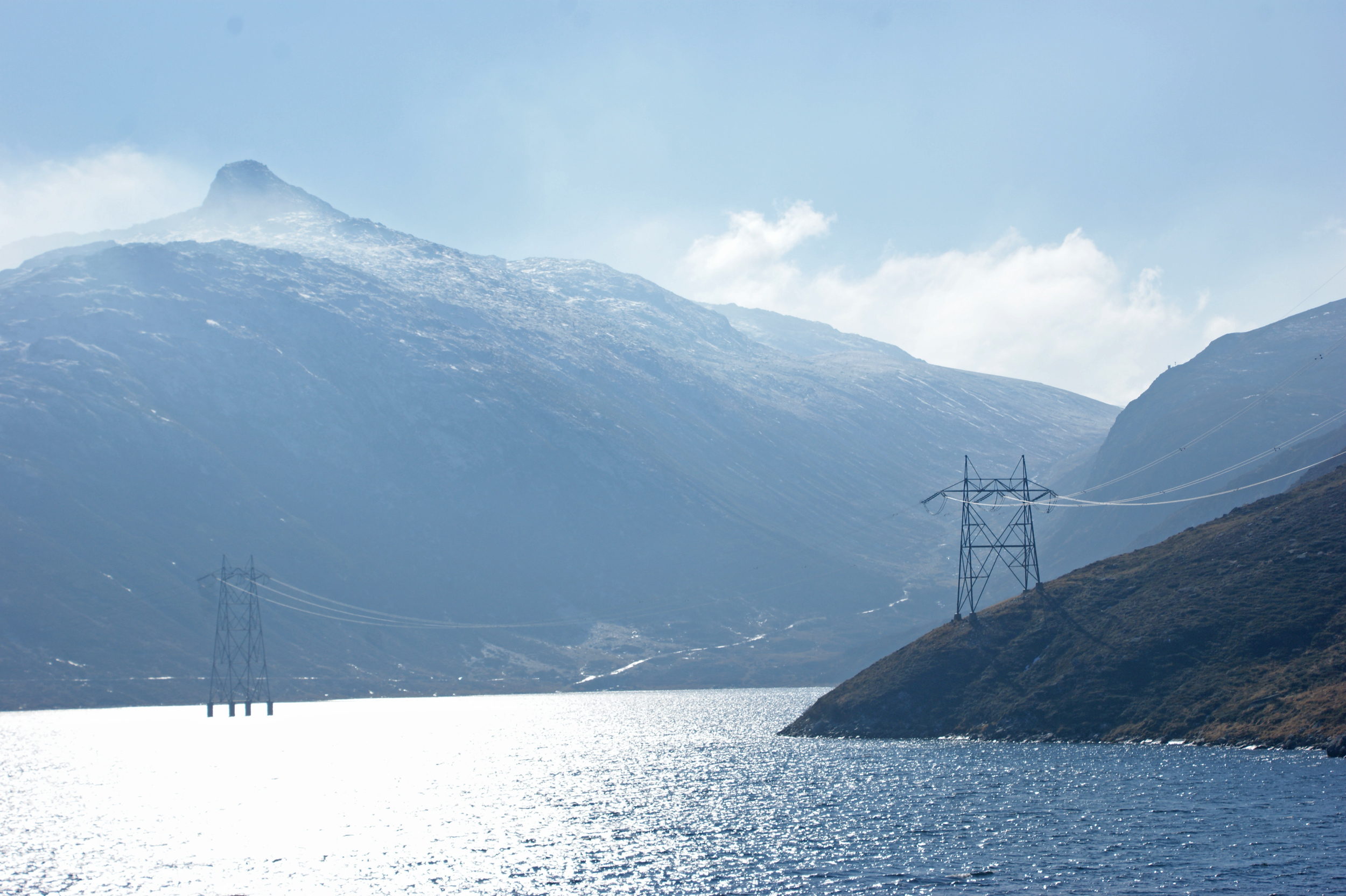
- Pizzo dell'Uomo from Lake of Saint Maria

Highest point
- Elevation: 2,663 m (8,737 ft)
- Prominence: 287 m (942 ft)
- Parent peak: Pizzo del Sole
- Coordinates: 46°32′40.3″N 8°46′37.9″E

Naming
- English translation: Mankind's Peak
- Language of name: Italian

Geography
- Location within Switzerland
- Country: Switzerland
- Canton: Ticino
- Parent range: Lepontine Alps
- Topo map: Swiss Federal Office of Topography swisstopo

Pizzo dell'Uomo is a mountain of the Lepontine Alps and part of the extended Saint-Gotthard Massif, located between Lai da Sontga Maria and Pizzo del Sole, in the canton of Ticino, just southwest of the Passo del Lucomagno. The border with the canton of Graubünden runs on the northern foot of the mountain, although it lies on the main Alpine watershed, between the basin of the Rhine and that of the Ticino.

Pizzo dell'Uomo is, along with the Chrüzlistock and Piz Vatgira, one of the main peaks traversed by the Gotthard Base Tunnel. The tunnel runs below the summit of Pizzo dell'Uomo, or more precisely, just northeast of it.
