= Pizzo Molare =

Mountain in Switzerland

- Location within Switzerland

Highest point
- Elevation: 2,585 m (8,481 ft)
- Prominence: 226 m (741 ft)
- Parent peak: Pizzo del Sole
- Coordinates: 46°29′19″N 8°51′54″E

Geography
- Location: Ticino, Switzerland
- Parent range: Lepontine Alps

Pizzo Molare is a mountain of the Lepontine Alps, overlooking Faido in the Swiss canton of Ticino. It is located on the chain between the main Leventina valley and the valley of Blenio.
