= Piz Vatgira =

Mountain in Switzerland

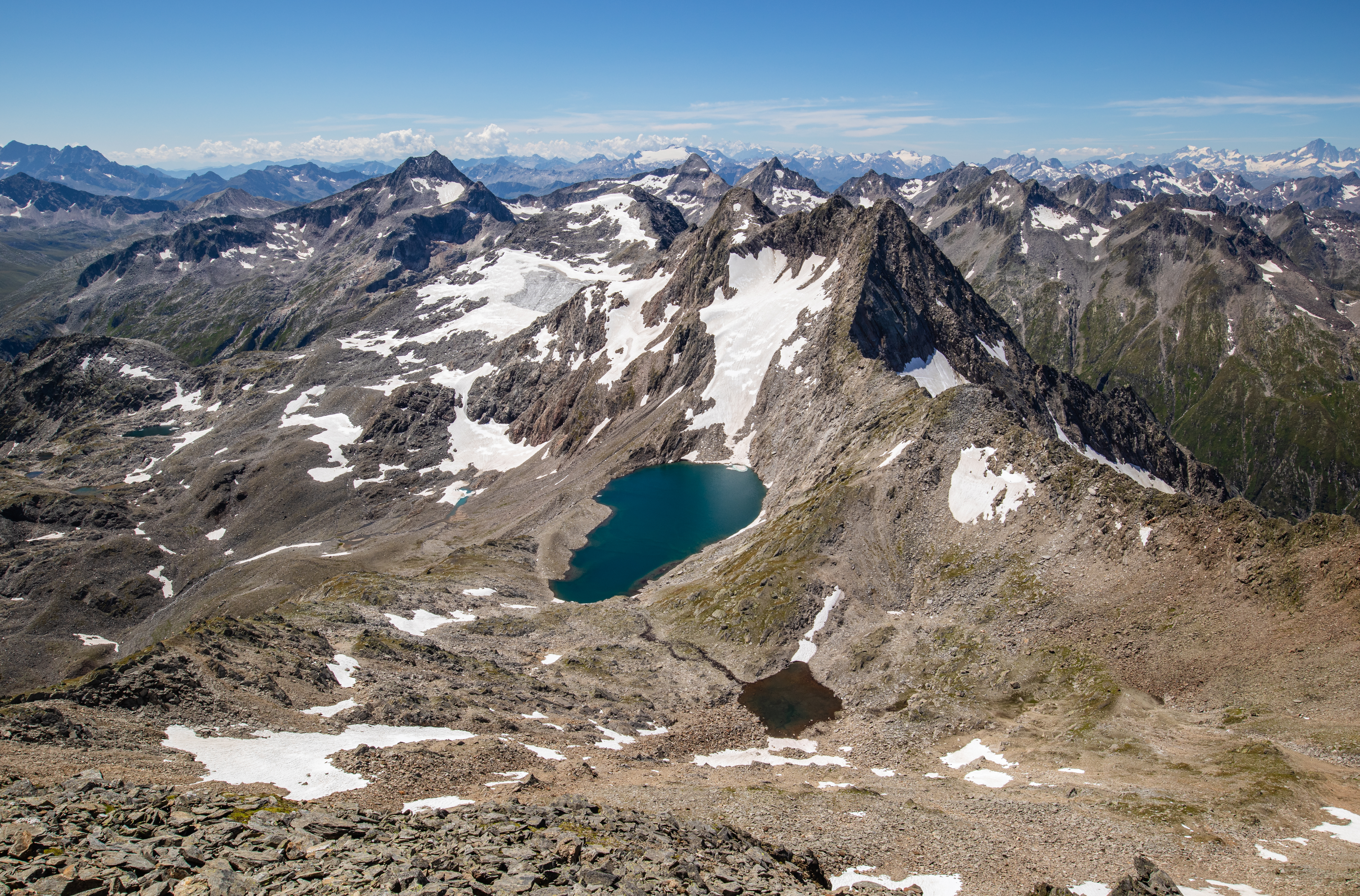
- Northeast side of the mountain with Lai Verd from Piz Gannaretsch

Highest point
- Elevation: 2,982 m (9,783 ft)
- Prominence: 157 m (515 ft)
- Parent peak: Piz Gannaretsch
- Listing: Mountains of Graubünden
- Coordinates: 46°36′22″N 08°46′15″E

Naming
- Language of name: Romansh

Geography
- Location within Switzerland
- Country: Switzerland
- Canton: Graubünden
- Parent range: Lepontine Alps
- Topo map: Swiss Federal Office of Topography swisstopo

Piz Vatgira (2,982 m (9,783 ft)) is a mountain of the Lepontine Alps and part of the extended Saint-Gotthard Massif, located south of Sedrun in the canton of Graubünden. The mountain lies between the valleys of Nalps and Medel, about halfway between Lai da Nalps and Lai da Sontga Maria. On its east side is a small glacier ending in the lake named Lai Verd (2,702 m).

Piz Vatgira, or more precisely a lower 2,981 metre-high summit 350 metres south of the main summit, lies exactly above the Gotthard Base Tunnel, at its deepest point. The tunnel, the longest and deepest in the world, runs 2,450 metres (8,040 ft) below the ground. Piz Vatgira is the highest of the three main peaks above the base tunnel, the other two being the Chrüzlistock and Pizzo dell'Uomo.
