= Gotthard Base Tunnel =

Railway tunnel through the Swiss Alps

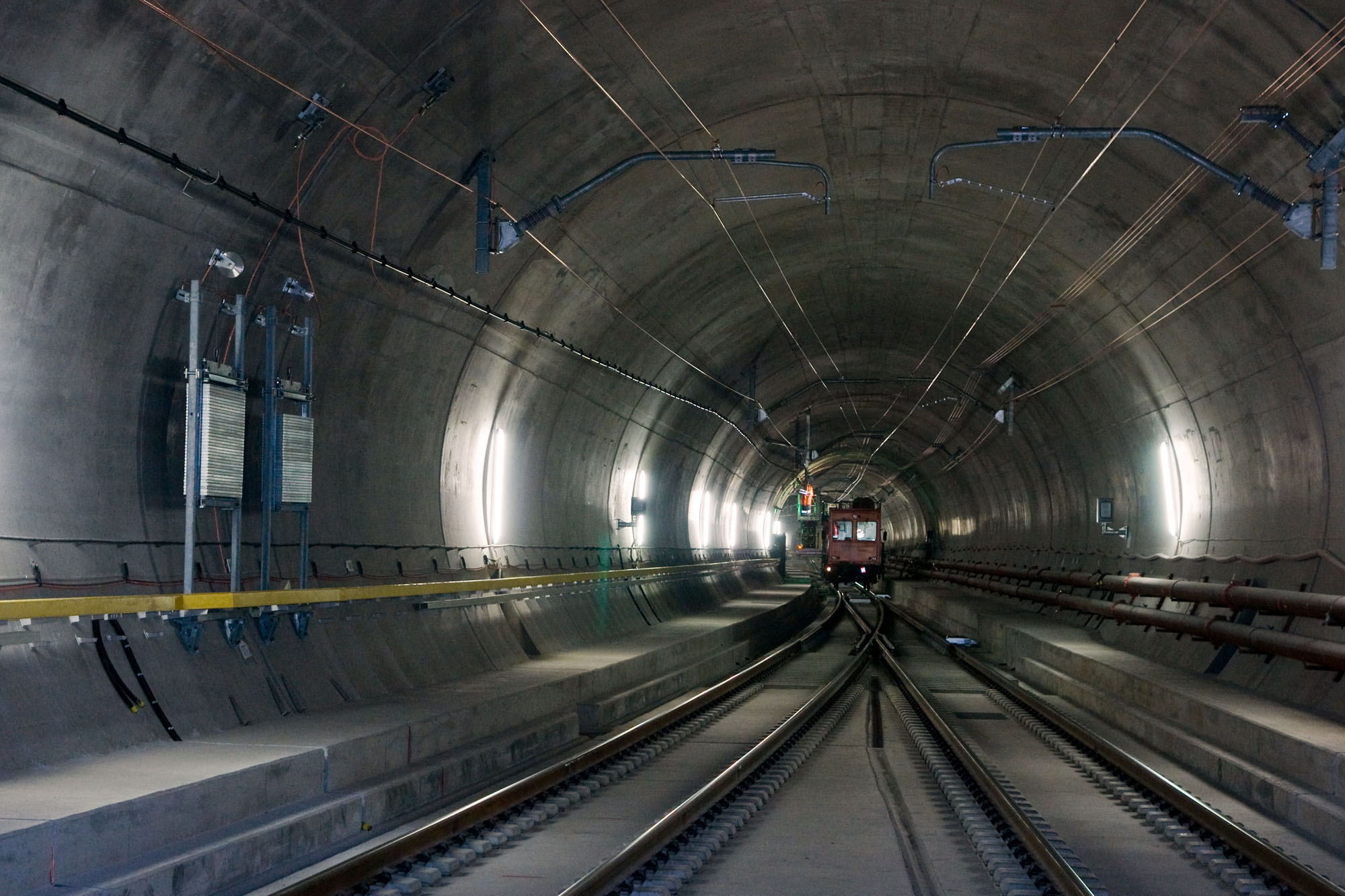
- Turnout at Faido multifunction station

Overview
- Official name: German: Gotthard-Basistunnel; Italian: Galleria di base del San Gottardo; Romansh: Tunnel da basa dal Sogn Gottard
- Line: Gotthard Line
- Location: Switzerland (Uri, Grisons and Ticino)
- Coordinates: 46.83586°N 8.64647°E (north portal); 46.37267°N 8.92535°E (south portal)
- Status: Active since 11 December 2016 (Interrupted from 10 August 2023 to 2 September 2024)
- System: Swiss Federal Railways (SBB CFF FFS)
- Crosses: Alps (western Glarus Alps and central Lepontine Alps at the eastern Gotthard Massif)
- Start: Erstfeld, canton of Uri (north, 460 m or 1,510 ft)
- End: Giornico, canton of Ticino (south, 312 m or 1,024 ft)

Operation
- Work began: 4 November 1999
- Opened: 1 June 2016
- Owner: SBB Infrastructure
- Operator: SBB CFF FFS
- Traffic: Railway
- Character: Passenger and freight

Technical
- Length: 57.09 km (35.5 mi); total 151.840 km (94.3 mi) for all tunnels, shafts and passages
- Line length: 57.104 km (35.5 mi) (east tunnel); 57.017 km (35.4 mi) (west tunnel)
- No. of tracks: 2 single-track tubes
- Track gauge: 1,435 mm (4 ft 8 1/2 in) (standard gauge)
- Electrified: 15 kV 16.7 Hz
- Operating speed: Passenger (service): 200 km/h (125 mph); Passenger (if delayed): 230 km/h (143 mph); Maximum (technical): 250 km/h (155 mph); Freight: 100 km/h (62 mph)
- Max elevation: 549 m (1,801 ft)
- Min elevation: 312 m (1,024 ft) (south portal)
- Tunnel clearance: 5.20 m (17 ft 1 in) from top of rail to overhead conductor
- Grade: max 4.055‰ (north); max 6.76‰ (south)

Route map
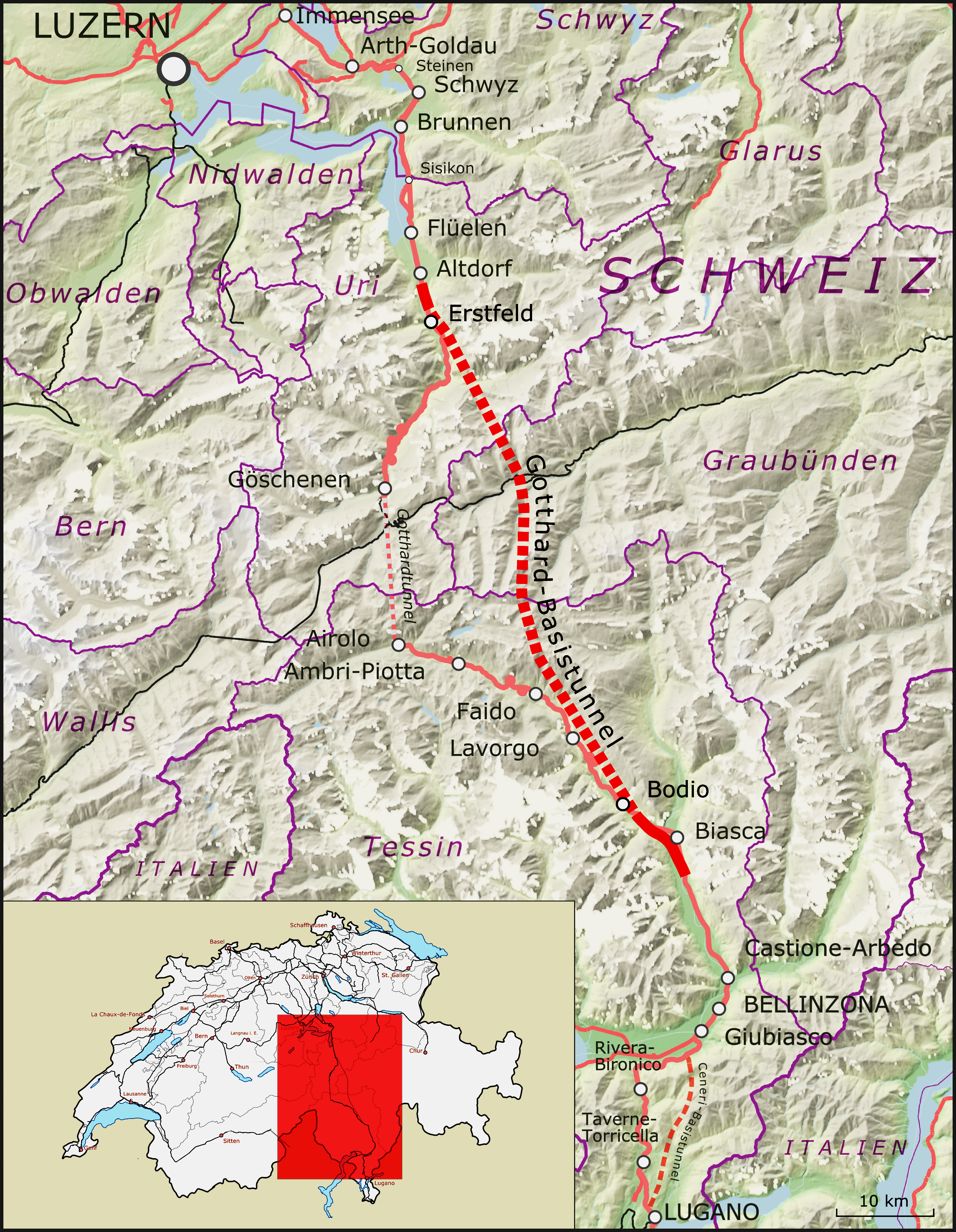
- Route map

The Gotthard Base Tunnel (GBT; German: Gotthard-Basistunnel, Italian: Galleria di base del San Gottardo, Romansh: Tunnel da basa dal Sogn Gottard) is a railway tunnel through the Alps in Switzerland. It opened in June 2016 and full service began the following December. With a route length of 57.09 km (35.47 mi), it is the world's longest railway and deepest traffic tunnel (Note: The world longest tunnel for transport of people is the Guangzhou Metro Line 3 in China (60 km). Reference: (in French) Nic Ulmi, "Des trous suisses remplis d'imaginaire" [interview with André Ourednik], Horizons, magazine of the Swiss National Science Foundation and the Swiss Academies of Arts and Sciences, number 118, September 2018, pages 22-23.) and the first flat, low-level route through the Alps. Located at the heart of the Gotthard axis, it is the third tunnel to connect the cantons of Uri and Ticino, after the Gotthard Tunnel and the Gotthard Road Tunnel.

The GBT consists of a large complex with, at its core, two single-track tunnels connecting Erstfeld (Uri) with Giornico (Ticino) and passing below Sedrun (Grisons). It is part of the New Railway Link through the Alps (NRLA) project, which also includes the Ceneri Base Tunnel further south (opened on 3 September 2020) and the Lötschberg Base Tunnel on the other main north–south axis. It is referred to as a "base tunnel" since it bypasses most of the existing vertex line, the Gotthard railway line, a winding mountain route opened in 1882 across the Saint-Gotthard Massif, which was operating at its capacity before the opening of the GBT. The new base tunnel establishes a direct route usable by high-speed rail and heavy freight trains.

The main purpose of the Gotthard Base Tunnel is to increase local transport capacity through the Alpine barrier, especially for freight on the Rotterdam–Basel–Genoa corridor. The tunnel is specifically meant to shift freight to trains from trucks, and thereby to reduce environmental damage and deadly road crashes. The tunnel also provides a faster connection between the canton of Ticino and the rest of Switzerland, as well as between northern and southern Europe, cutting the Basel/Zurich–Lugano–Milan journey time for passenger trains by one hour (and from Lucerne to Bellinzona by 45 minutes).

After 64 percent of Swiss voters accepted the NRLA project in a 1992 referendum, the first preparatory and exploratory work began in 1996. Construction began in November 1999 at Amsteg. Drilling operations were completed in March 2011. Completed in 2016, the final cost was reported to be CHF 12.2 billion (US$12 billion). A freight train derailment in August 2023 forced the tunnel's closure for over a year before reopening in September 2024.

== Description ==
The Gotthard Base Tunnel, with a length of 57.09 km (35.5 mi) and a total of 151.84 km (94.3 mi) of tunnels, shafts and passages, is the longest railway tunnel in the world, (Note: Excluding subway tunnels that lie near the surface. See also: List of longest subway tunnel sections and List of longest tunnels.) with a geodetic distance of 55.782 km (34.7 mi) between the two portals. It is also the first flat route through the Alps or any other major mountain range, with a maximum elevation of 549 m (1,801 ft) above sea level, corresponding to that of Bern. It is the deepest railway tunnel in the world, with a maximum depth of 2,450 m (8,040 ft), comparable to that of the deepest mines on Earth. Without ventilation, the temperature inside the mountain reaches 46 °C (115 °F).

Like the two other tunnels passing below the Gotthard, the Gotthard Base Tunnel connects two Alpine valleys across the Saint-Gotthard Massif: the Urner Reusstal in the canton of Uri, in which flows the river Reuss, and the Valle Leventina, the largest valley in the canton of Ticino, in which the river Ticino flows. Unlike most other tunnels, the Gotthard Base Tunnel passes under several distinct mountain massifs, two of them being major subranges of the Alps, the Glarus Alps and the Saint-Gotthard Massif, with the valley of the Anterior Rhine, the Surselva in the canton of Graubünden, between them. The tunnel passes under these two ranges more than 2,000 m (6,600 ft) below the Chrüzlistock (2,709 m or 8,888 ft) and the Piz Vatgira (2,983 m or 9,787 ft, near the Lukmanier Pass). While the cantons of Uri and Ticino are part of the German- and Italian-speaking areas of Switzerland respectively, the Surselva is mainly Romansh-speaking.

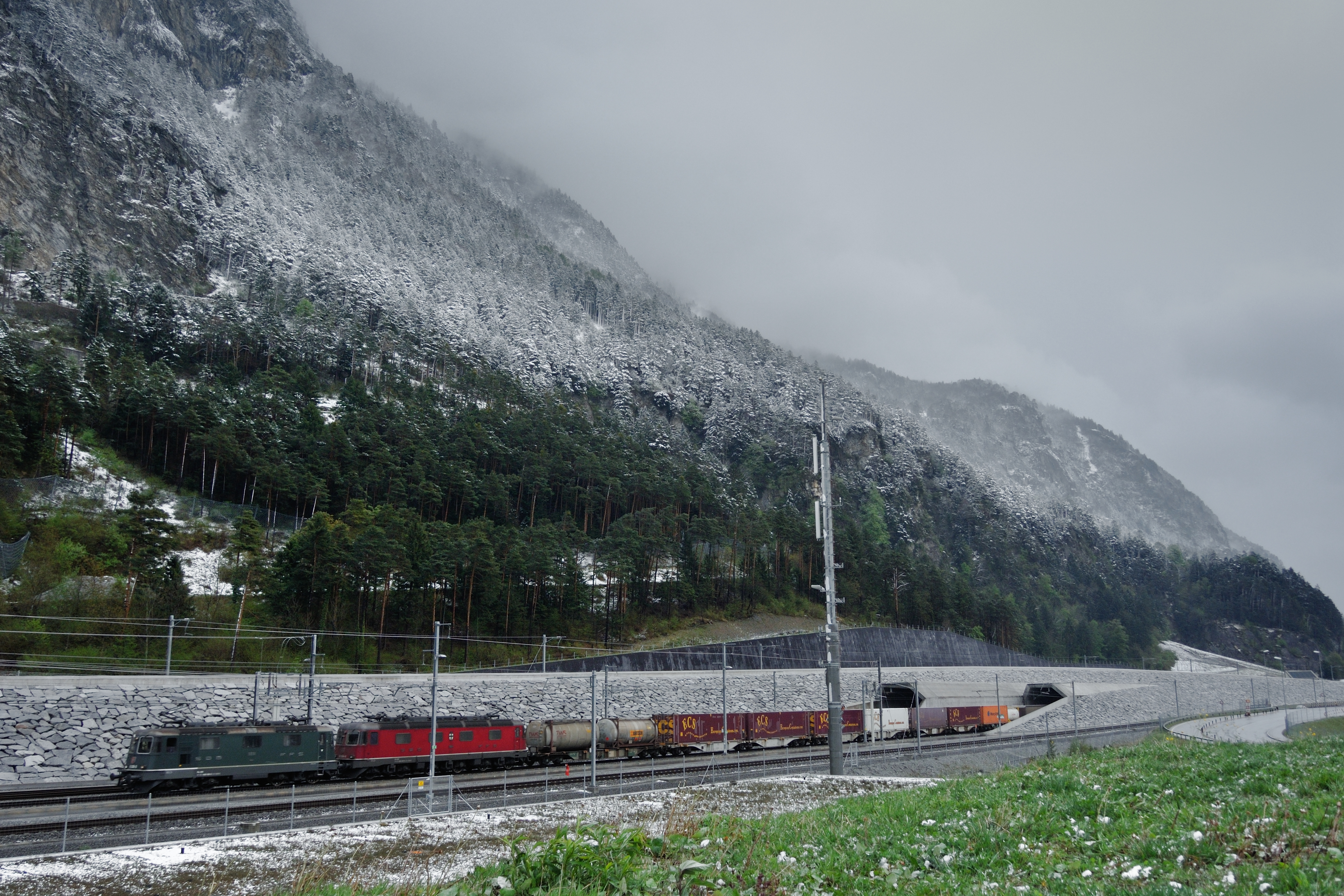
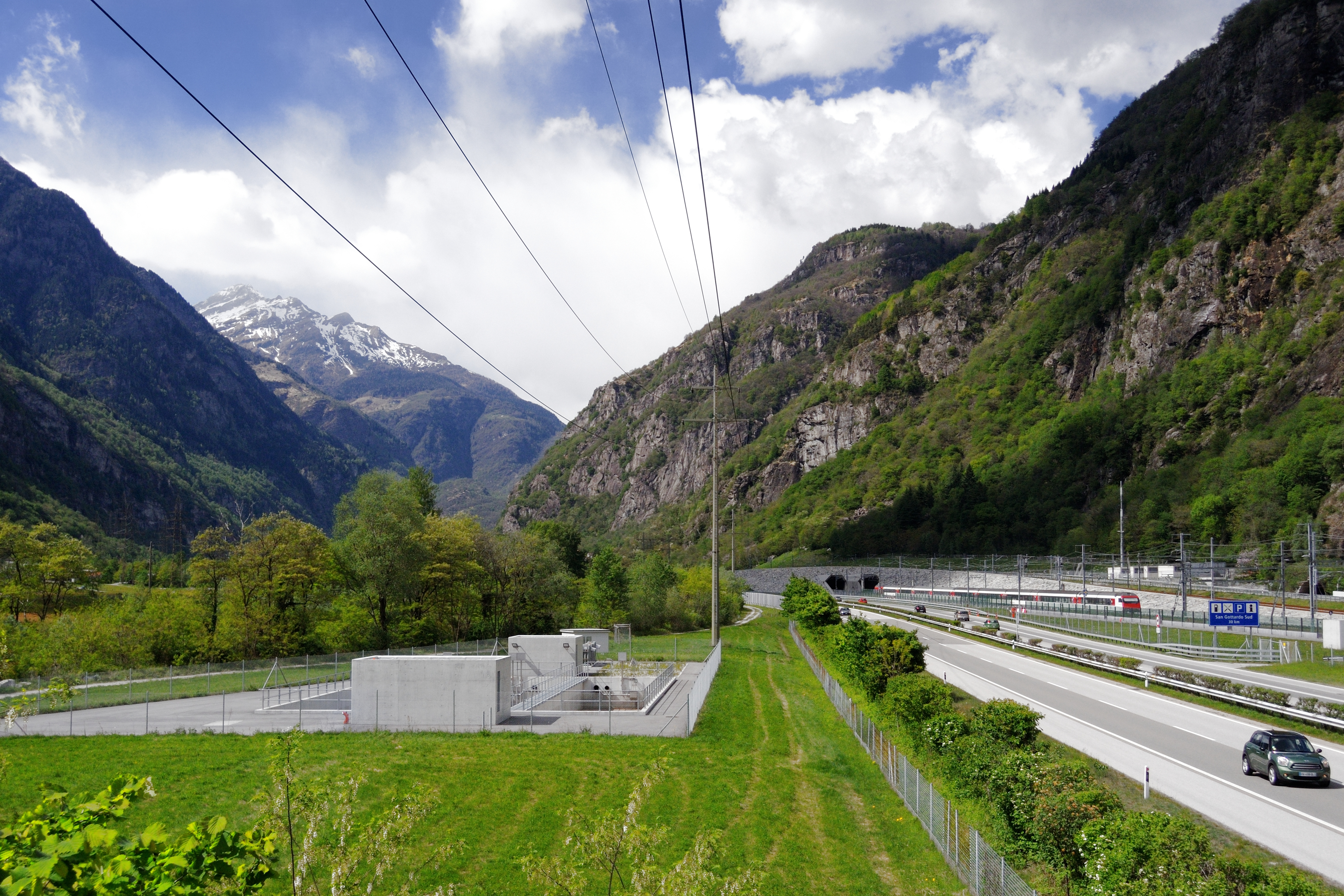
The north and south portals on the same spring day. Note the prevalence of coniferous trees and snow at the north portal and their absence at the south portal.

The Alps strongly influence the European climate – and that of Switzerland in particular – and there can be substantially different weather conditions at each end of the GBT, described by the Ticinese architect Mario Botta: "The light changes at the Gotthard: that of the Mediterranean Sea is not the same as that of the continent, that of the central lands, that of Europe far away from the sea." On average, the temperature is about 3 °C (5 °F) higher on the south side than the north side, but on some days, temperature differences are well over 10 °C (18 °F). (Note: See the climate tables of Altdorf and Grono, two towns situated near each end of the tunnel. See also normals/climate-diagrams-and- normal-values-per-station.html?region=Map Climate diagrams and normal values per station (MeteoSwiss).)

The north portal lies in the north of the municipality of Erstfeld at an elevation of 460 m (1,510 ft), east of the Reuss. There, the tunnel penetrates the western slopes of the Bälmeten and Chli Windgällen (although only marginally) before passing below the valley of the Chärstelenbach, a creek in the Maderanertal. From there, the tunnel runs parallel to the small valley of Etzli, below the Witenalpstock. The main crest of the Glarus Alps, which is the watershed between the Reuss and the Anterior Rhine, is crossed below the Chrüzlistock, the crest having an elevation of about 2,700 m (8,900 ft) at this point. From the crest and border, the tunnel runs parallel to the small valley of the river Strem (Val Strem) before passing below Sedrun and the Anterior Rhine. From the bottom of the valley, the tunnel proceeds towards the valley of the Rein da Nalps (Val Nalps) and passes east of Lai da Nalps, before crossing the Gannaretsch range below the western summit of Piz Vatgira (2,981 m or 9,780 ft). This is the deepest point of the tunnel, with a rock layer of 2,450 m (8,040 ft) above it. The tunnel then passes below the valley of the Rein da Medel (Val Medel) and west of Lai da Sontga Maria. After a few kilometres the tunnel crosses the watershed between the Anterior Rhine and the Ticino, just north of Pizzo dell'Uomo (2,525 m or 8,284 ft). This point corresponds to the main chain of the Alps, and is the main drainage divide between the Rhine and the Po. For a few kilometres, the tunnel passes below two western tributaries of the Brenno in the Valle Santa Maria before crossing the last range, west of the Passo Predèlp (about 2,500 m or 8,200 ft) and east of Faido. It then follows the eastern slopes of the large Valle Leventina, the valley of the Ticino, for about 18 km (11 mi) to the south portal at Giornico, at an elevation of 312 m (1,024 ft), just 3 km (1.9 mi) before Biasca, where the Brenno converges with the Ticino. (Note: See Swisstopo topographic maps with catchment areas layer: map.geo.admin.ch.)

The closest railway stations to the portals are Altdorf and Biasca. The first regularly served railway stations on the base line (as of 2016/17) are those of Arth-Goldau (Schwyz), a railway node with links to Lucerne and Zurich, and Bellinzona (the "Gate of Ticino"), with links to Locarno, Luino and Lugano (via the Monte Ceneri Rail Tunnel). The journey from Arth-Goldau to Bellinzona takes not more than an hour. The station of Altdorf is planned to be served by 2021. There also have been talks of using that of Biasca. The travel between Altdorf and Biasca would last less than 25 minutes.

Accesses to the GBT complex
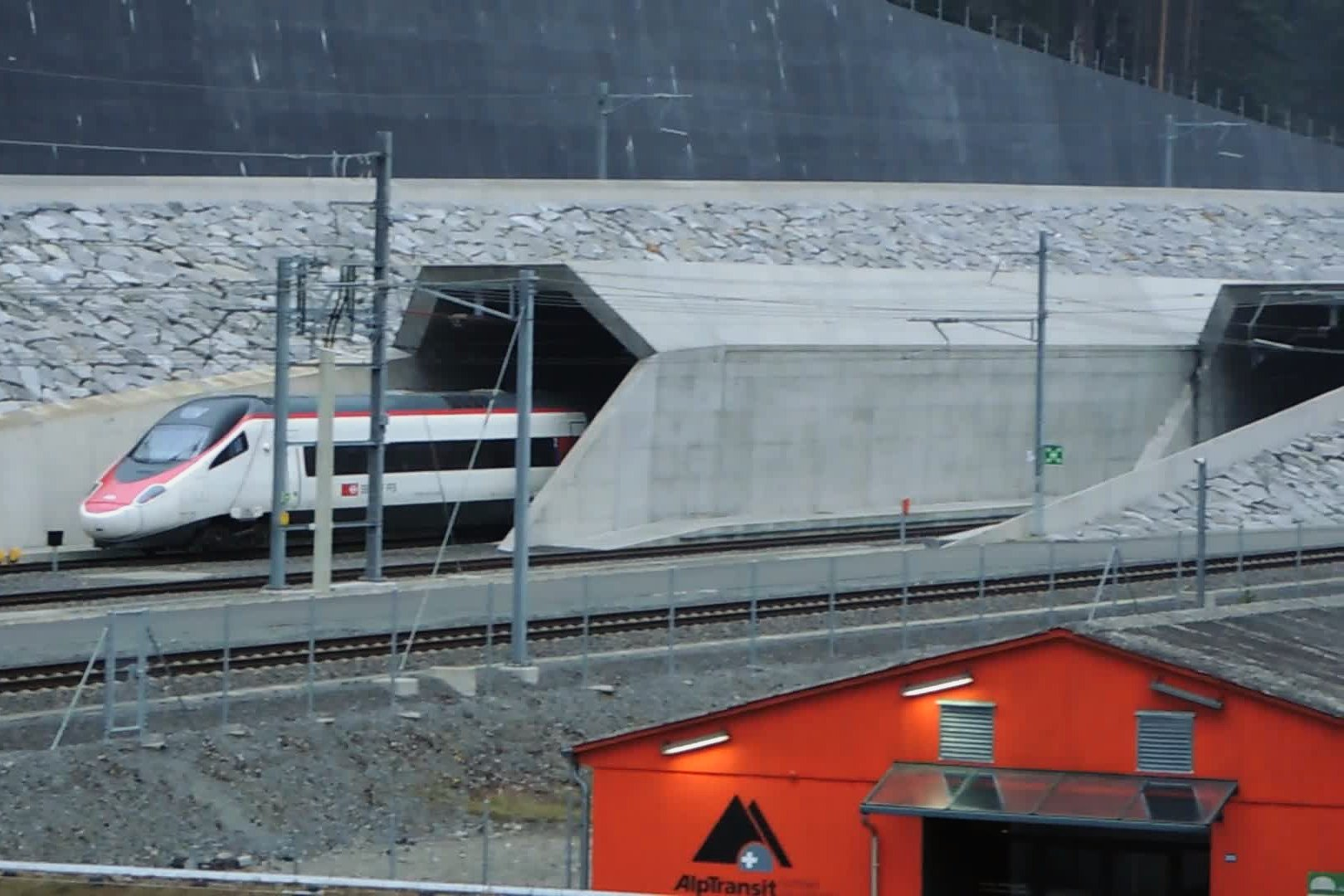
Erstfeld, north portal, 460 m (1,510 ft) a.s.l.

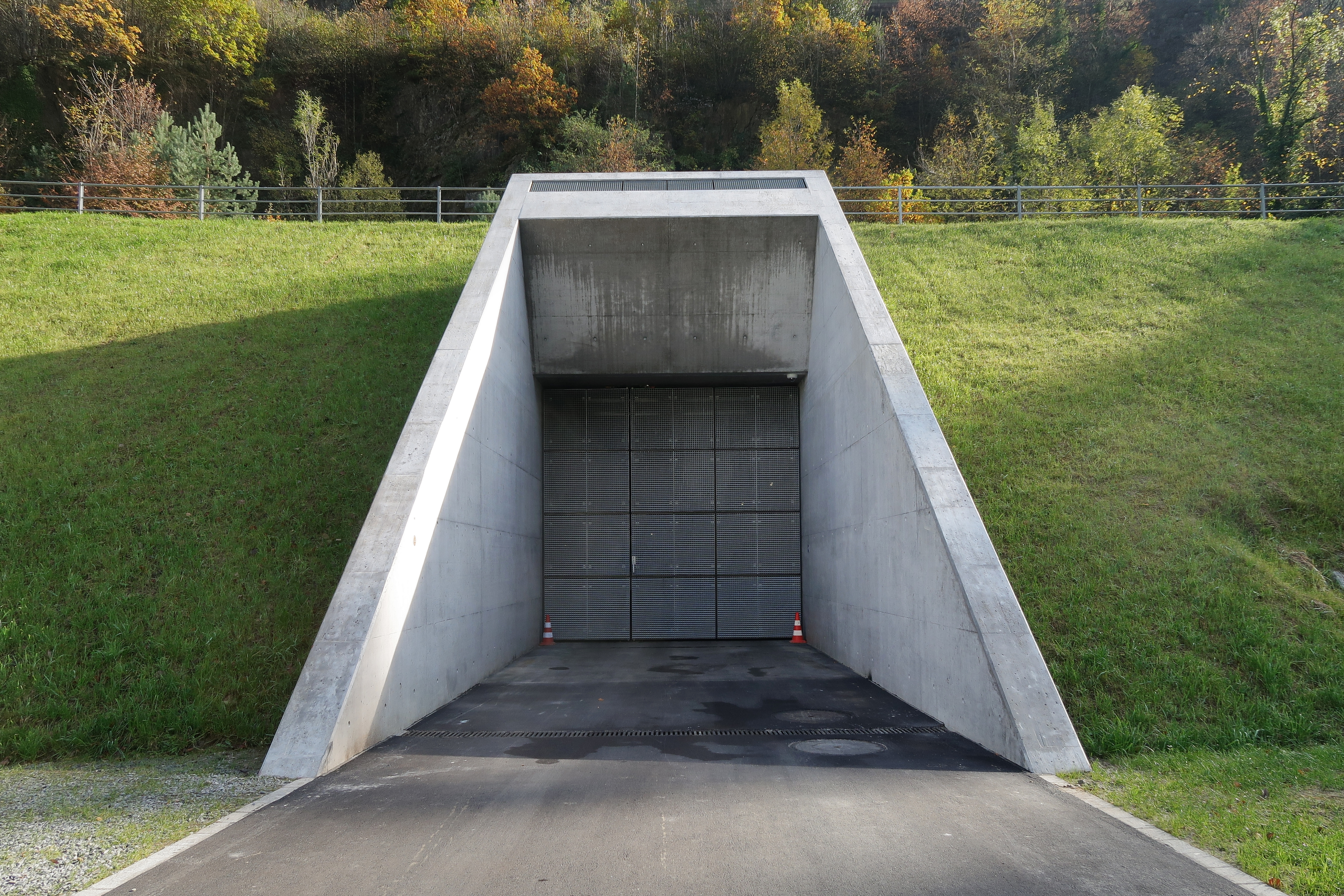
Amsteg portal (maintenance access), 507 m (1,663 ft) a.s.l.

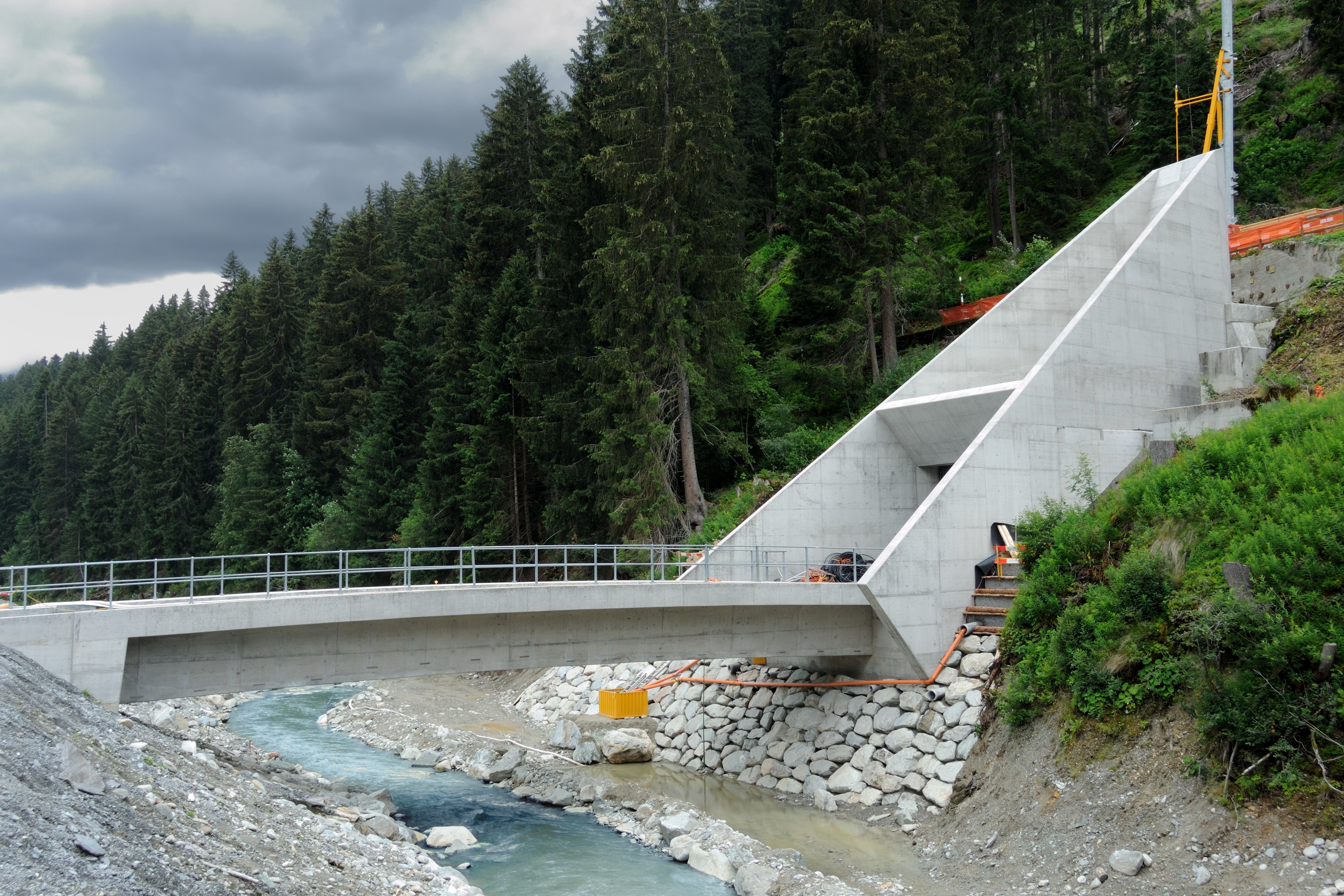
Sedrun portal (maintenance access, bridge over the Anterior Rhine), 1,334 m (4,377 ft) a.s.l.

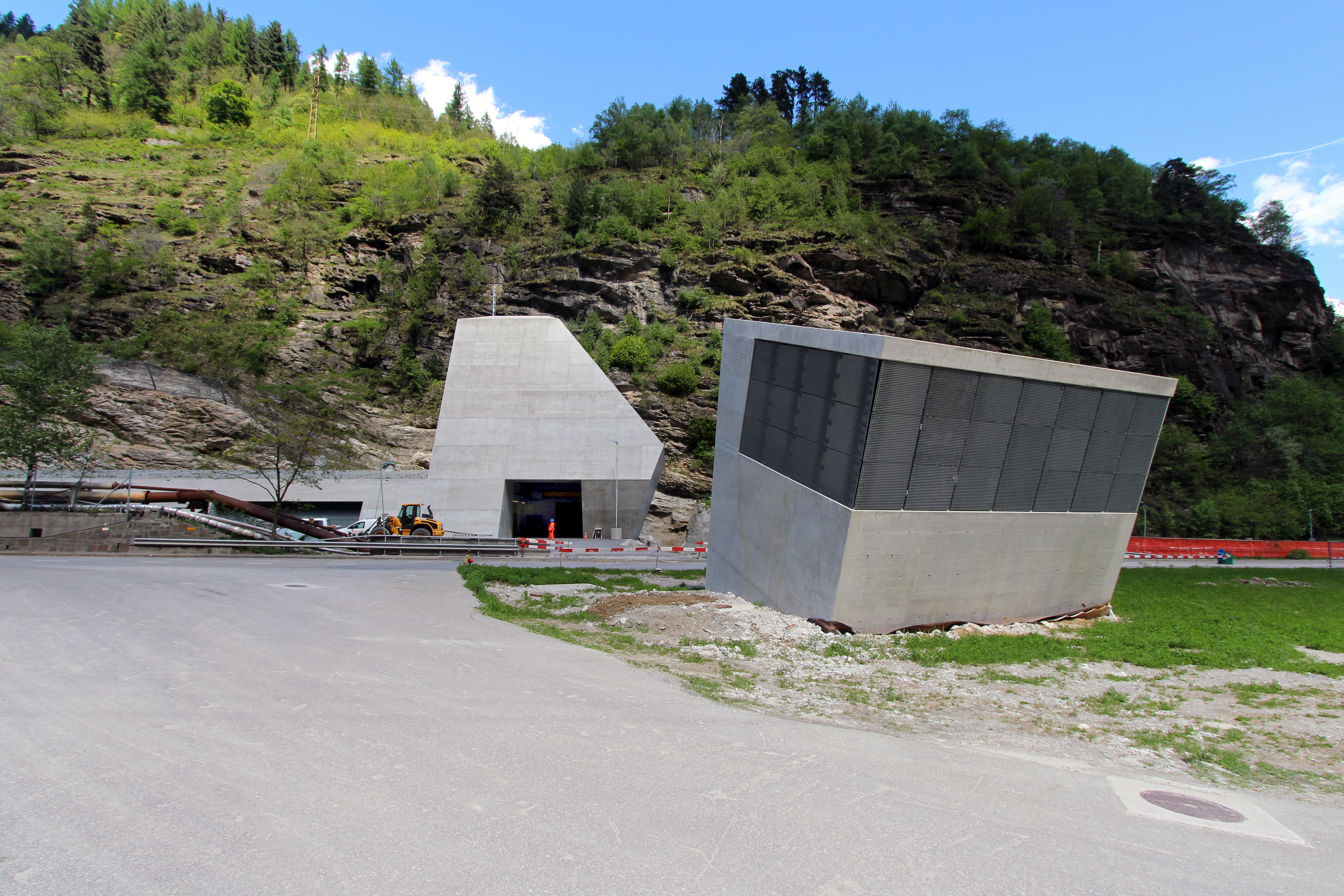
Faido portal (maintenance access), 757 m (2,484 ft) a.s.l.

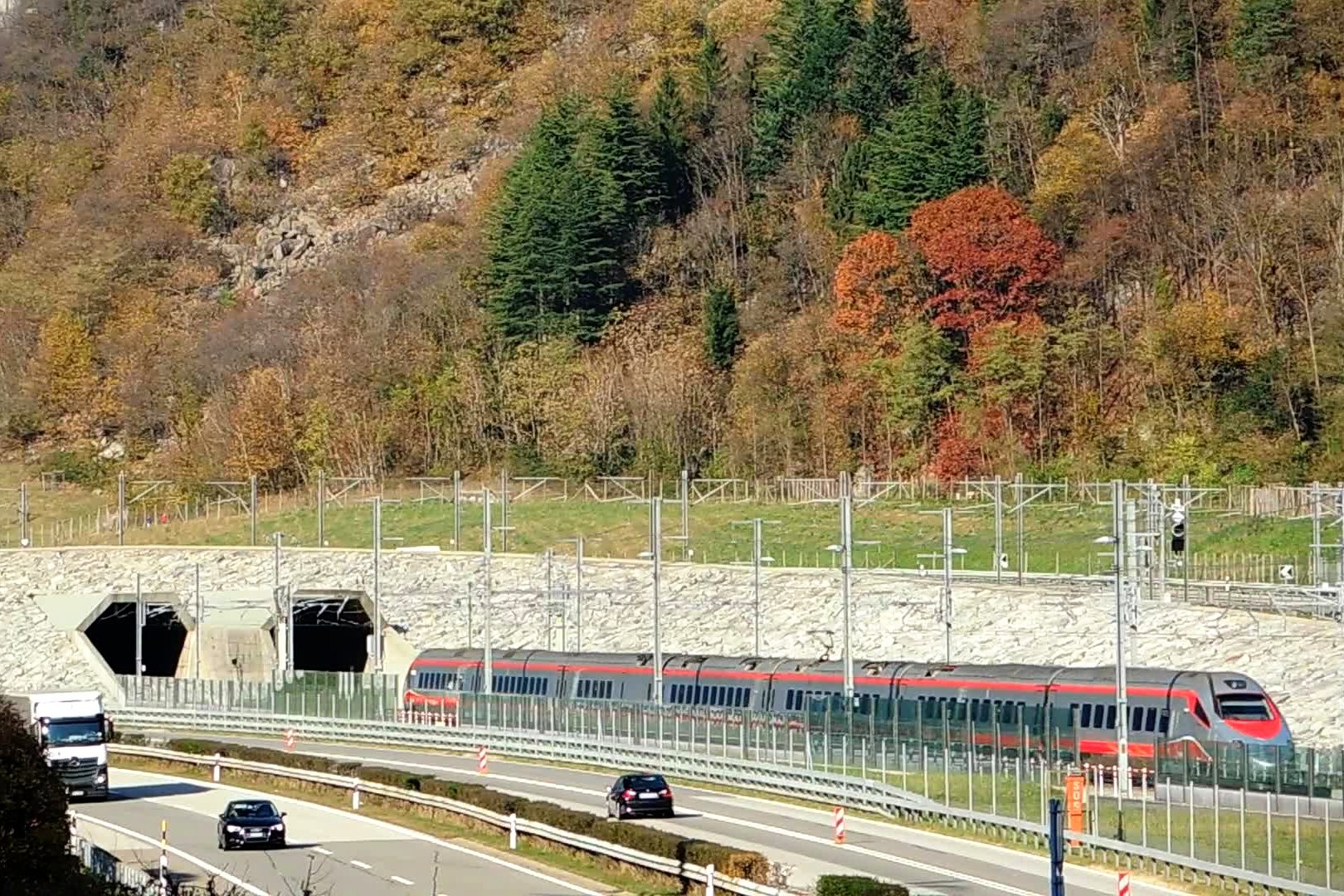
Biasca, south portal, 312 m (1,024 ft) a.s.l.

== History ==
=== Background ===
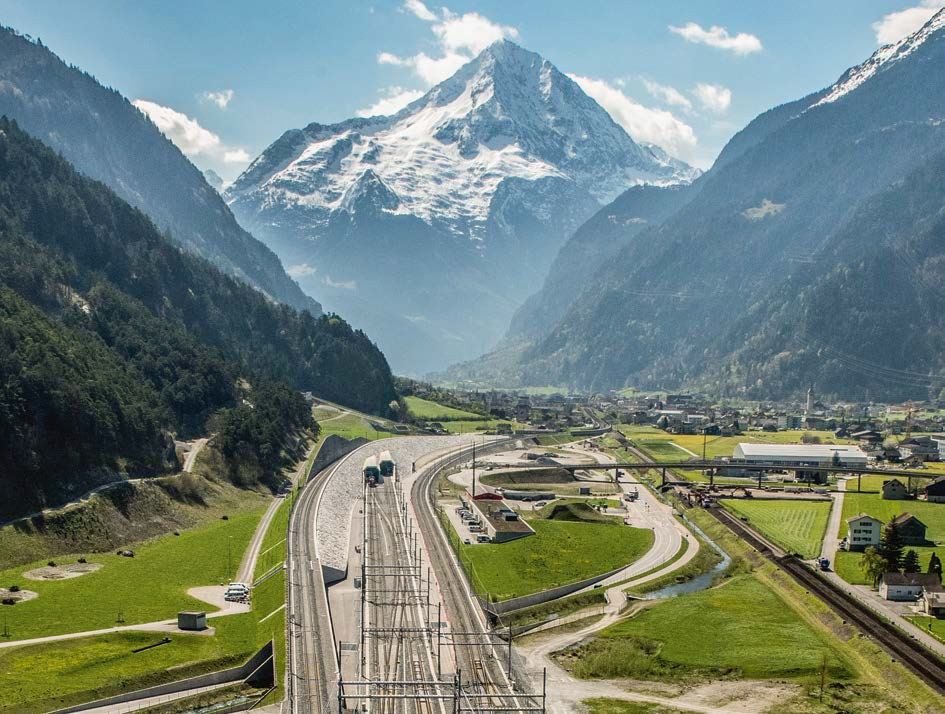
Aerial view of the Uri Reuss Valley and the 3,073-metre-high (10,082 ft) Bristen peak from the north portal. The historic routes on the Gotthard (road and railway) follow the Reuss upwards, which flows west of the Bristen.

Since the 13th century, the 2,106 m-high (6,909 ft) Gotthard Pass has been an important trade route from northern to southern Europe. Control of its access routes led to the birth of the Swiss Confederacy. The Gotthard Pass is located halfway between Lake Lucerne and Lake Maggiore. It is the shortest link between the navigable Rhine and the Po. Before modern transport, the traverse of the pass took days, and snow makes it a challenge in winter.

Quite late, compared to other current top-importance routes through the Alps (e.g. Simplon, San Bernardino, Brenner, Mont Cenis), namely in 1830, the first Saint-Gotthard Pass road was established after centuries-long usage of a bridle path. From 1842 onwards, a daily course by the Gotthard Post, a stagecoach drawn by five horses with ten seats, still took about 23 hours from Como to Flüelen. It would last until 1921.

Historic routes on the Gotthard

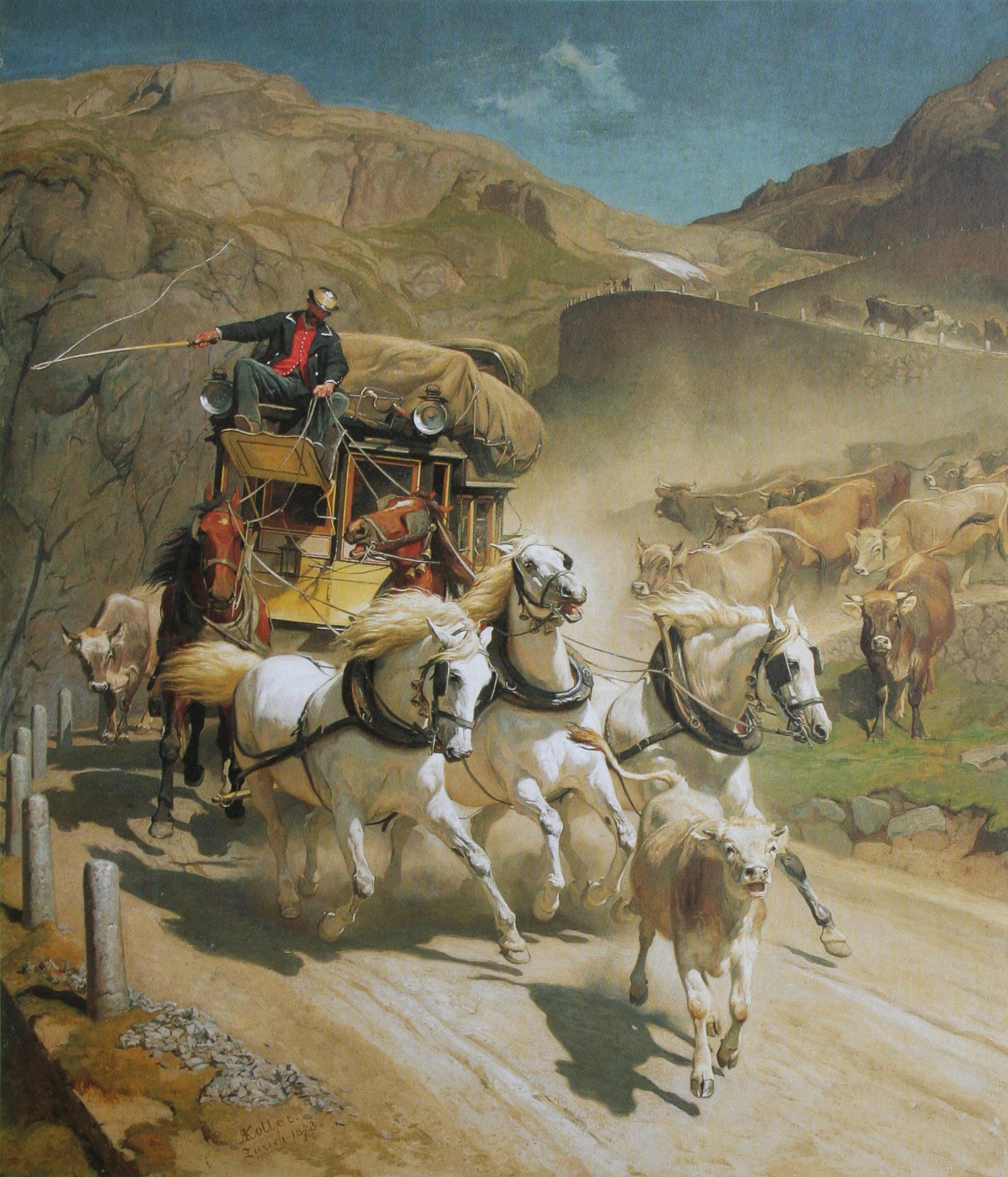
Pass road
"The Gotthard Mail Coach" (Rudolf Koller, 1873) on the Tremola

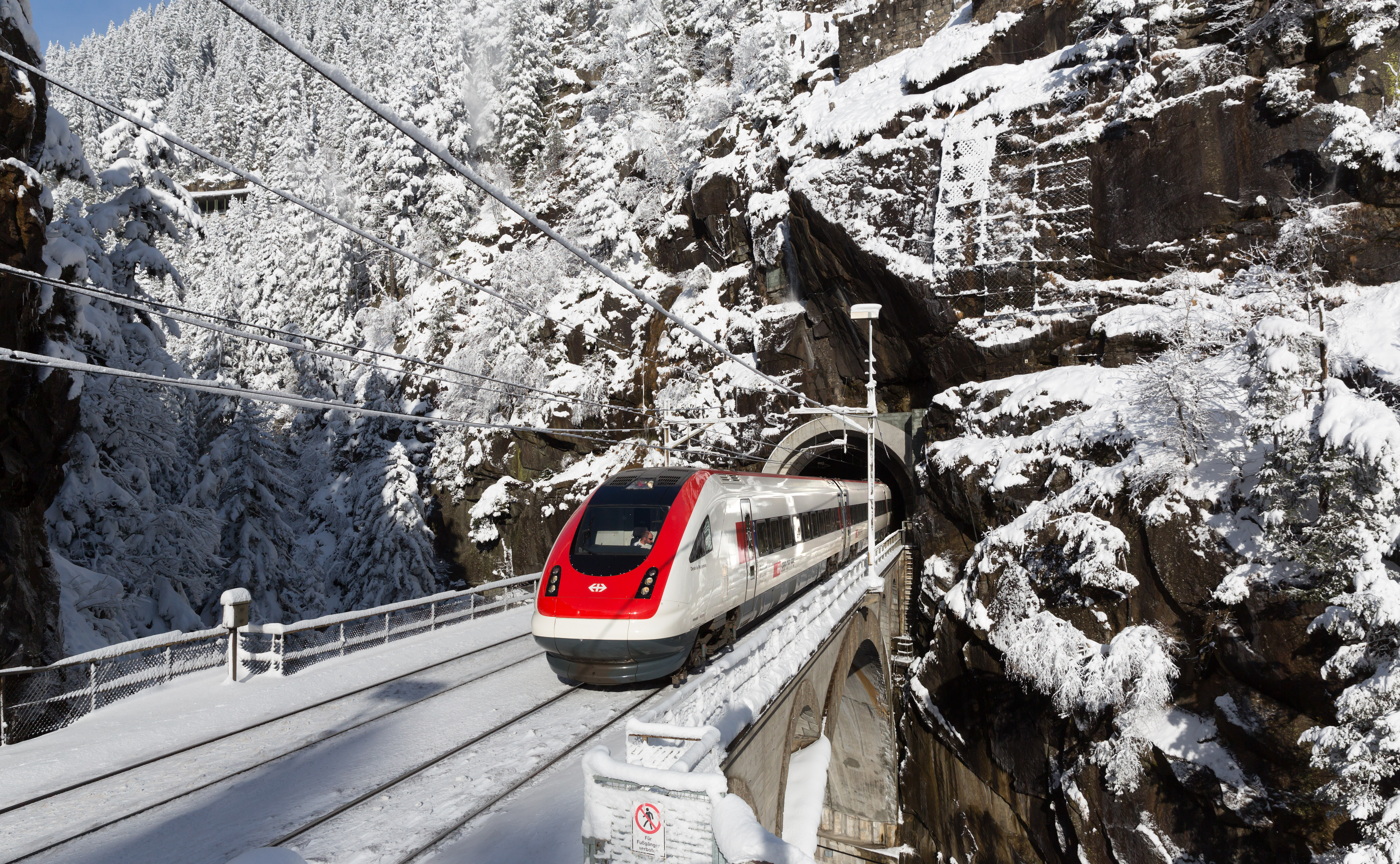
Old vertex railway with SBB tilting intercity train at Wassen

In 1882, with the inauguration of the Gotthard Railway Tunnel, the travel time between Altdorf and Biasca was reduced dramatically to only hours, though often accompanied with overnight stays in large Fin de siècle-hotels, for example in Biasca. In those days, it was still an adventure and it was only affordable to the rich. Electrification of the railway line in 1922 significantly reduced travel time again. Refilling water boilers of steam locomotives was no longer necessary. There were also the technical advantages of electrical engines and future technical improvements.

From 1924, car transport on trains through the railway tunnel began. The road between Göschenen and Airolo over the summit of the pass, comporting notably the Schöllenen ravine and the Tremola, had countless hairpin turns and serpentine curves, dropping 1,000 m (3,300 ft) in altitude. It posed a huge challenge for automobiles of those days. From 1953 onwards, the pass road was sequentially improved and expanded at several sections along the Gotthard route, finally ending in 1977 with the opening of an expressway fully circumventing the Tremola. In winter, however, due to the snow, cars could only cross the Gotthard on the train.

Transit time was further dramatically reduced with the opening of the Gotthard Road Tunnel and the finalization of the northern part of A2 motorway through the Urner Reusstal (in close proximity to the railway), with many additional tunnels (then leading from Basel to the Gotthard Road Tunnel), in 1980. With the completion in 1986 of the A2 motorway in the Valle Leventina, the main valley leading from Airolo down to Bellinzona, and the surmounting of the Monte Ceneri between Bellinzona and Lugano in 1983, finally a continuous motorway was established from the northern border of Switzerland in Basel to the southern border in Chiasso, or the shortest motorway route from North-German Hamburg as far as South-Italian Sicily, bringing down the competitiveness of the railway line. Passenger speed was also increased on the railway line with the use of tilting trains, notably the ICN, although maximum speed remaining far lower than on a modern straight high-speed line. Both modern motorway and historic railway rely on heavy rockfall and avalanche protection equipments and are exposed to harsh weather condition in winter.

After the opening of the auto tunnel, in 1980, traffic increased more than tenfold. The existing tunnel was at its capacity by 2013. A second tunnel will be built next to the first, following a national referendum. Construction started in 2021 and is scheduled to finish in 2027.

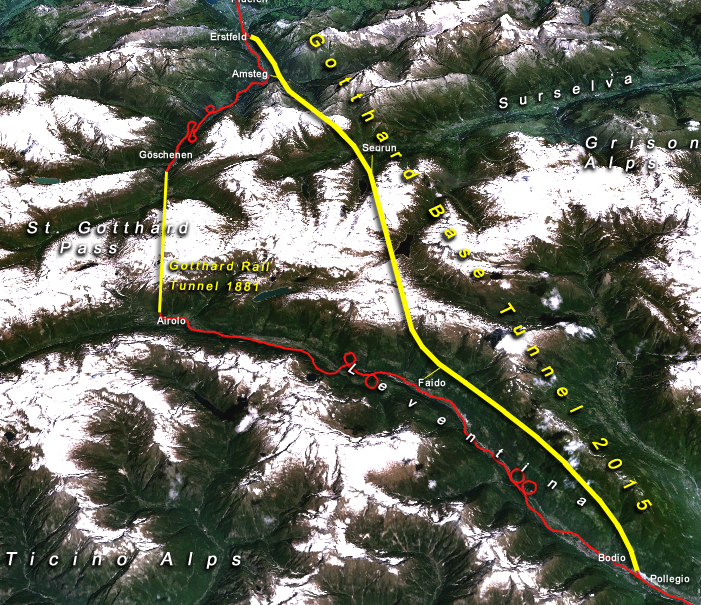
Relative location and size of Gotthard Tunnel (1882) and Gotthard Base Tunnel (2016), both shown in yellow. Open-air rail shown in red.

As early as 1947, engineer Eduard Gruner imagined a two-story base tunnel from Amsteg to Biasca, both rail and road, with a stop at Sedrun, to provide a faster and flatter passage through the Swiss Alps. Similarly to Gruner's idea, the GBT cuts through the Gotthard Massif some 600 m (2,000 ft) below the older tunnel. On the historic track only the Gotthard Railway trains up to 1,300 t (2.9×10^{6} lb) when using two locomotives or up to 1,500 t (3.3×10^{6} lb) with an additional bank engine at the end of the train are able to pass through the narrow mountain valleys and through spiral tunnels climbing up to the portals of the old tunnel at a height of 1,151 m (3,776 ft) above sea level. Since the GBT is in full service, standard freight trains of up to 3,600 t (7.9×10^{6} lb) are able to pass this natural barrier.

Because of ever-increasing international truck traffic, Swiss voters chose a shift in transportation policy in September 1992 by accepting the NRLA proposal. A second law, the Alpine Protection Act of February 1994, requires a shift of as much tonnage as possible from truck transport to train transport.

The goal of both the laws is to transport trucks, trailers and freight containers through Switzerland, from Basel to Chiasso, and beyond by rail to relieve the overused roads, and that of the Gotthard in particular, by using intermodal freight transport and rolling highways (where the entire truck is transported). The GBT substantially contributes to the requirements of both laws and enables a direct flat route from the ports of the North Sea (notably Rotterdam) to those of the Mediterranean Sea (notably Genoa), via the Rhine corridor.

Although the technical maximum speed is 250 km/h (155 mph) through the GBT, the maximal authorized speed has been reduced to 230 km/h (145 mph) for ecological and economical reasons, while the operating speed of passenger trains is restricted to 200 km/h (125 mph) in order to accommodate the freight traffic, with the possibility to accelerate up to 230 km/h (145 mph) in case of delay. At opening the GBT reduced travel times for trans-Alpine train journeys by about 40 minutes, and by one hour when the adjacent Zimmerberg and Ceneri Base Tunnels were completed. This is viewed as a revolution, especially in the isolated region of Ticino, which is separated from the rest of the country by the Alps and the Gotthard. The two stations of Bellinzona and Lugano (respectively named "Gate of Ticino" and "Terrace of Ticino") were entirely renovated for the opening of the GBT, among other improvements.

As of 2016, the Gotthard Base Tunnel is the longest railway tunnel in the world. It is the third Swiss tunnel to bear this title, after the Gotthard Tunnel (15 km or 9.3 mi, 1882) and the Simplon Tunnel (19.8 km or 12.3 mi, 1905). It is the third tunnel built under the Gotthard, after the Gotthard Tunnel and the Gotthard Road Tunnel.

=== Construction ===
2004–2011 tunnel excavation
Year	Month	Total excavated		
Year	Month	(kilometres)	(miles)	Of planned (%)
2004	July	52.34	32.52	34.1
2005	June	74.59	46.35	48.6
2006	June	94.10	58.47	61.3
2007	June	103.67	64.42	67.6
2008	March	108.02	67.12	70.4
2008	April	109.00	67.73	71.0
2008	July	113.20	70.34	73.8
2008	August	115.20	71.58	75.1
2008	October	118.40	73.57	77.2
2009	January	124.00	77.05	81.6
2009	March	127.30	79.10	83.9
2009	May	131.00	81.40	86.3
2009	June	133.00	82.64	87.6
2009	July	134.80	83.76	87.9
2009	August	136.60	84.88	90.0
2009	September	137.30	85.31	90.4
2009	October	138.60	86.12	91.3
2009	November	140.00	86.99	92.2
2009	December	141.38	87.85	93.0
2010	January	141.82	88.12	93.4
2010	February	142.48	88.53	93.8
2010	March	143.80	89.35	94.7
2010	April	144.80	89.97	95.4
2010	May	145.40	90.35	95.8
2010	June	146.10	90.78	96.2
2010	July	146.60	91.09	96.6
2010	August	147.33	91.55	97.0
2010	September	147.98	91.95	97.5
2010	October	149.10	92.65	98.2
2010	November	149.90	93.14	98.7
2010	December	150.40	93.45	99.0
2011	January	150.49	93.51	99.1
2011	February	150.77	93.68	99.3
2011	March	151.26	93.99	99.6
2011	April	151.70	94.26	99.91
2011	May	151.75	94.29	99.94
2011	June	151.82	94.34	99.99
2011	July	151.82	94.34	100

AlpTransit Gotthard AG was responsible for construction. It is a wholly owned subsidiary of the Swiss Federal Railways (SBB CFF FFS).

To cut construction time in half, four access tunnels were built so that construction could start at four different sites simultaneously: Erstfeld, Amsteg, Sedrun, and Faido. A fifth at Giornico was added later. The two tunnels are joined approximately every 325 m (1,066 ft) by connecting galleries. Trains can move between the tunnels in the two multifunction stations at Sedrun and Faido. These stations house ventilation equipment and technical infrastructure and serve as emergency stops and evacuation routes.

Access to the Sedrun station site is by a level access tunnel 1 km (0.6 mi) long from the valley floor near Sedrun. At the end of the access tunnel, two vertical shafts lead 800 m (2,625 ft) down to the base tunnel level. A proposal to construct a functioning railway station, called Porta Alpina (from Romansh, "Alpine Gate"), at this site was evaluated, but the project was put on hold in 2007 and definitively cancelled by the federal authorities in 2012 as uneconomical.

The final breakthrough in the east tube occurred on 15 October 2010 at 14:17 +02:00. The final breakthrough in the west tube occurred on 23 March 2011 at 12:20.

On 30 August 2013, the tunnel was entirely traversed for the first time from Bodio to Erstfeld in six hours, by diesel train, buses and by foot.

On 16 December 2013, the operational test phase started on a 13-kilometre (8.1 mi) stretch in the southern section of the west tube between Faido and Bodio (Giornico). Its purpose was to test the infrastructure and any ancillary systems.

On 31 October 2014, the railway track installation was completed. A gold sleeper on the very last part of the track was installed during the event to mark this milestone of progress.

On 1 October 2015, following permission by the Federal Office of Transport, the first tests on the entire length of the GBT were performed, with steadily increasing speed. On 8 November, a train reached the top speed of 275 km/h (171 mph).

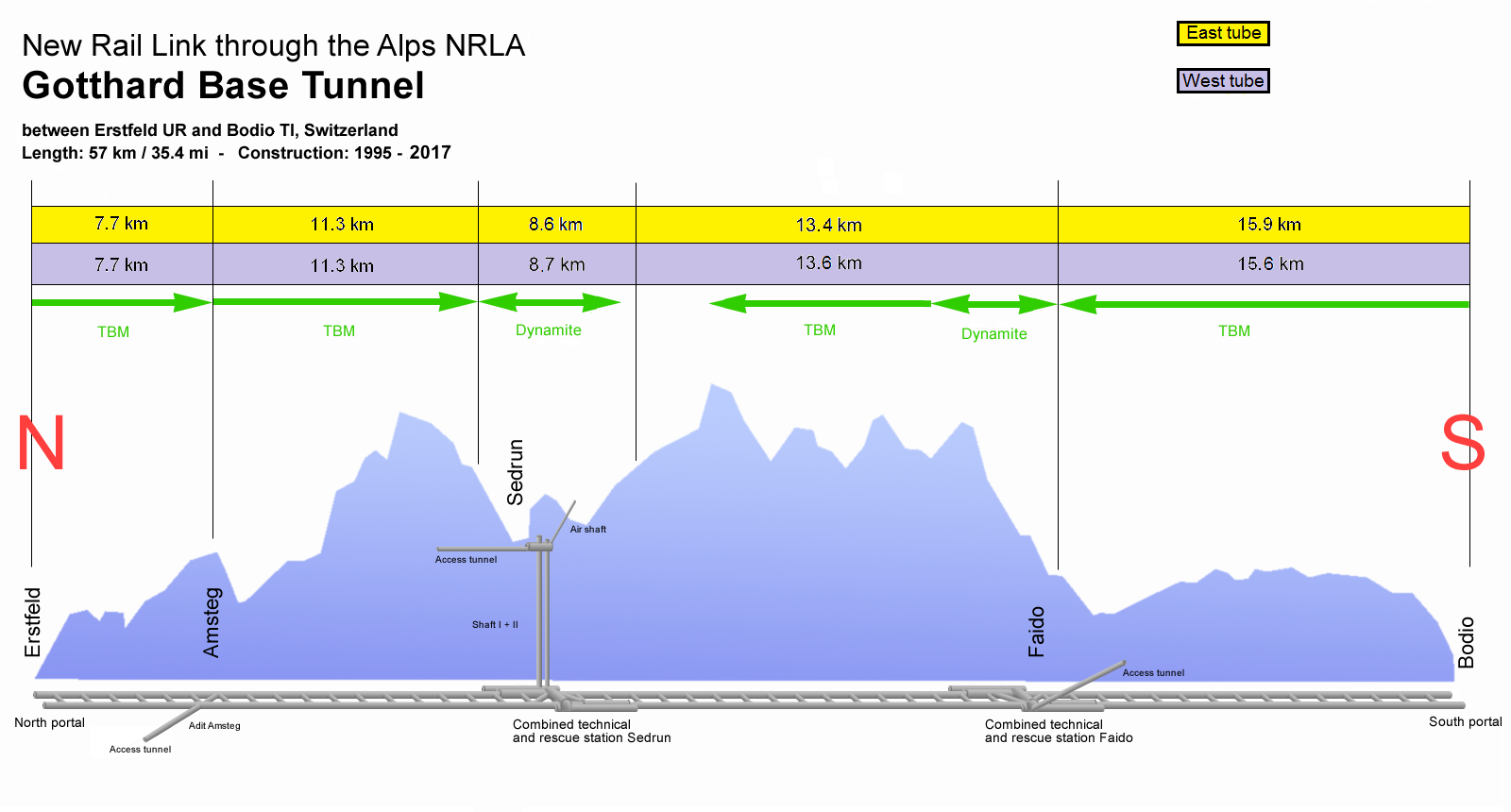
A diagram showing the mountains above the Gotthard Base Tunnel, and the locations and directions the tunnel was excavated from.

==== Allocation of work ====
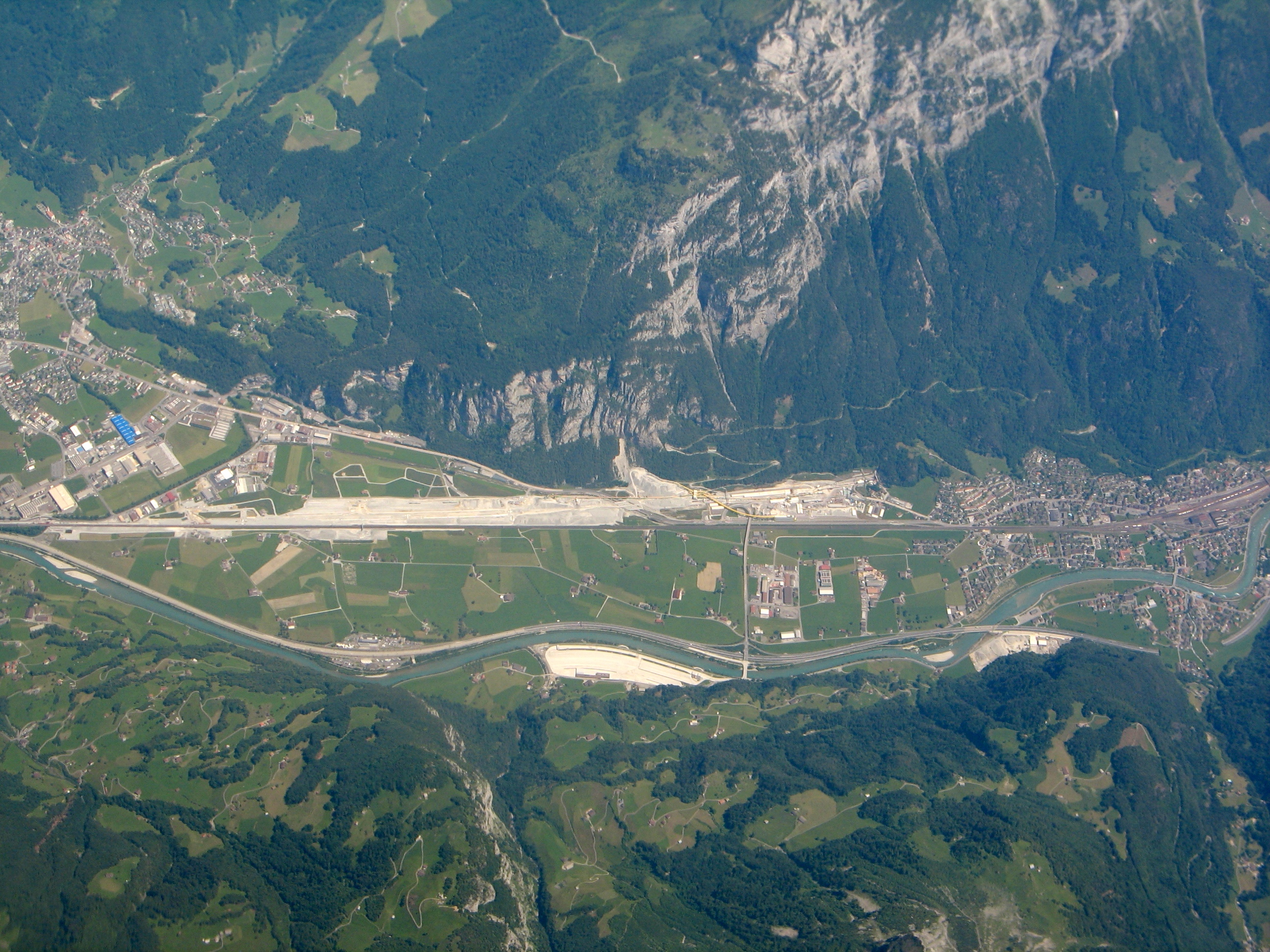
Aerial view of the Erstfeld area (north portal) in 2009

The contracts were awarded in sections:

- Erstfeld (the 7.7 km (4.8 mi) section from Erstfeld to Amsteg), with two tunnel boring machines (TBM) boring the two tubes. The break-through of the east tube between Erstfeld and Amsteg took place on 15 June 2009. The portal area was surface-mined.
- Amsteg (the 11.3 km (7.0 mi) section from Amsteg to north of Sedrun), ARGE AGN (Strabag and Züblin Murer) received the contract for work in this sector. On 9 December 2009, the Amsteg section was officially delivered to the owner for fitting-out, with civil engineering, construction, concrete and lining work completed in early 2010.
- Sedrun (the 8.6 km (5.3 mi) East tube and 8.7 km (5.4 mi) West tube in the section immediately north and south of Sedrun), along with work performed by Transco (Bilfinger SE, Implenia, Frutiger and Impresa Pizzarotti). The final breakthrough in the west tube occurred in March 2011. The northbound tubes from Amsteg to the Sedrun multifunction station (north) were handed over to the railway systems contractor Transtec Gotthard on 15 September 2011, the date specified in the construction schedule.
- Faido (13.4 km (8.3 mi) East tube and 13.6 km (8.5 mi) West tube in the section from south of Sedrun to Faido), with Consorzio TAT (Alpine Mayreder Bau, CSC Impresa costruzioni, Hochtief and Implenia and Impregilo).
- Giornico (15.9 km (9.9 mi) East tube and 15.6 km (9.7 mi) West tube in the section from Faido to Giornico), with work performed by Consorzio TAT (Alpine Mayreder Bau, CSC Impresa costruzioni, Hochtief, Implenia and Impregilo). Civil engineering construction, concrete and lining works were completed in early 2010.

==== Deaths during construction ====
Nine workers died during construction; one in the Amsteg section, two in the Sedrun section, and three each in the southernmost Faido and Giornico sections.

Date	Nationality	Details
8 June 2000	German	Hit by a boring bar that fell 700 m (2,300 ft).
12 March 2002	South African	Buried by excavation material.
3 April 2003	German	Hit by a rock.
11 September 2003	Austrian	Crushed by a toppling cable drum.
21 January 2005	Italian (1); Italian (1)	Hit in a mine train collision.
23 November 2006	German	Crushed by a mine train.
24 June 2010	German	Catapulted from an inspection train.
16 July 2012	Italian	Fell from a scaffold.

=== Inauguration and commissioning ===
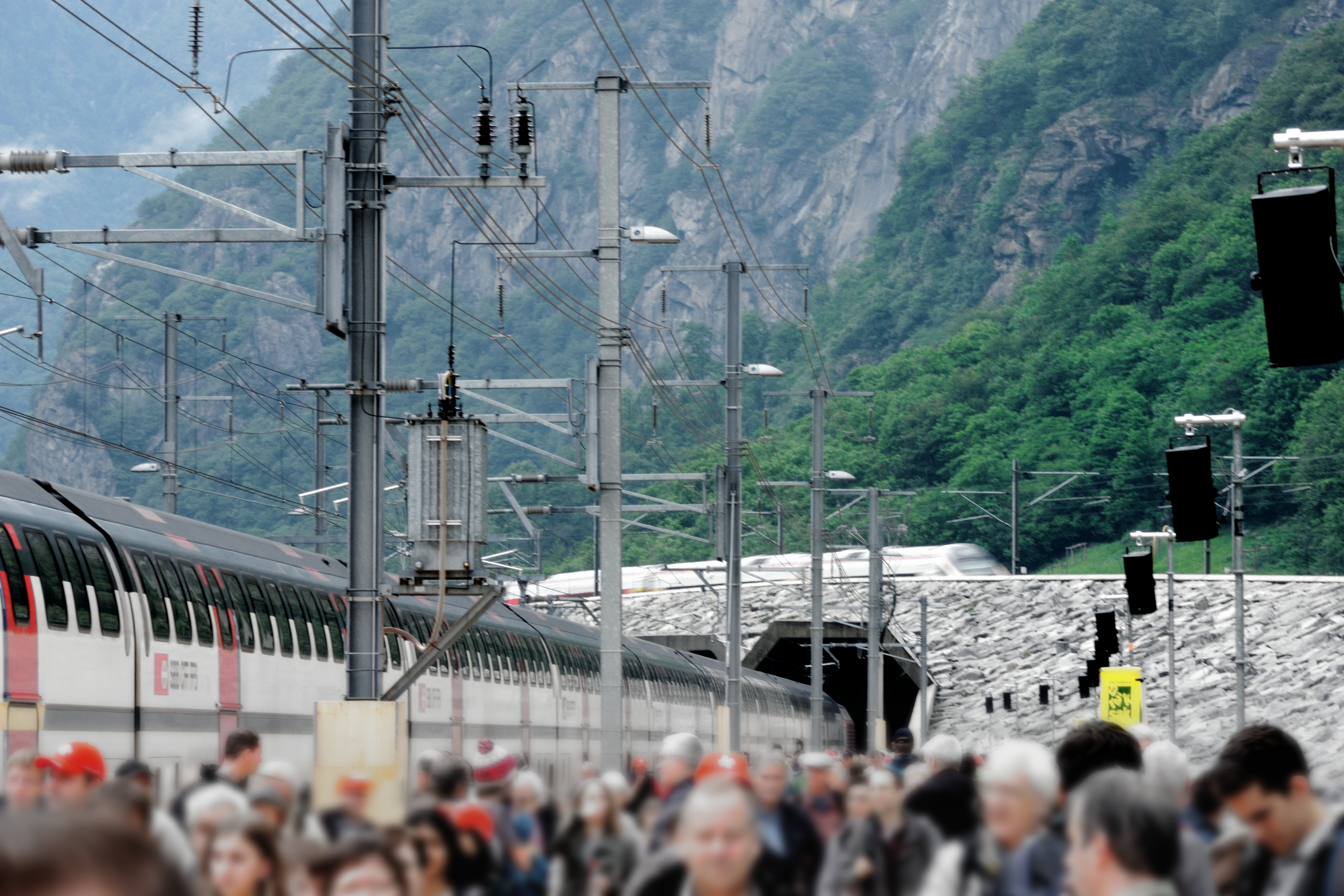
Inauguration days, where the public was allowed to experience high-speed travel below the Alps for the first time, and to move quickly between the exhibitions held in Erstfeld and Bodio.

In 2016, several events, including festivities and special exhibitions, were held around the Gotthard, culminating in the inaugurations in early June, dubbed Gottardo 2016. Public institutions joined the celebrations: Swiss Post issued a special stamp commemorating the Gotthard Base Tunnel, and Swissmint issued gold and silver coins dedicated to the opening.

On 31 May 2016, a day before the inauguration, the nine people who died during construction were commemorated in a ceremony at the north portal in Erstfeld that was led by a Catholic vicar general, a vicar of the Evangelical-Reformed Church of Uri, a Jewish rabbi, and a Muslim imam. A bronze memorial plaque with their names — four coming from Germany, three from Italy, and one from each of South Africa and Austria – was unveiled by AlpTransit Gotthard AG CEO Renzo Simoni. A Catholic shrine to Saint Barbara, the patron of miners, stands inside the tunnel as a memorial.

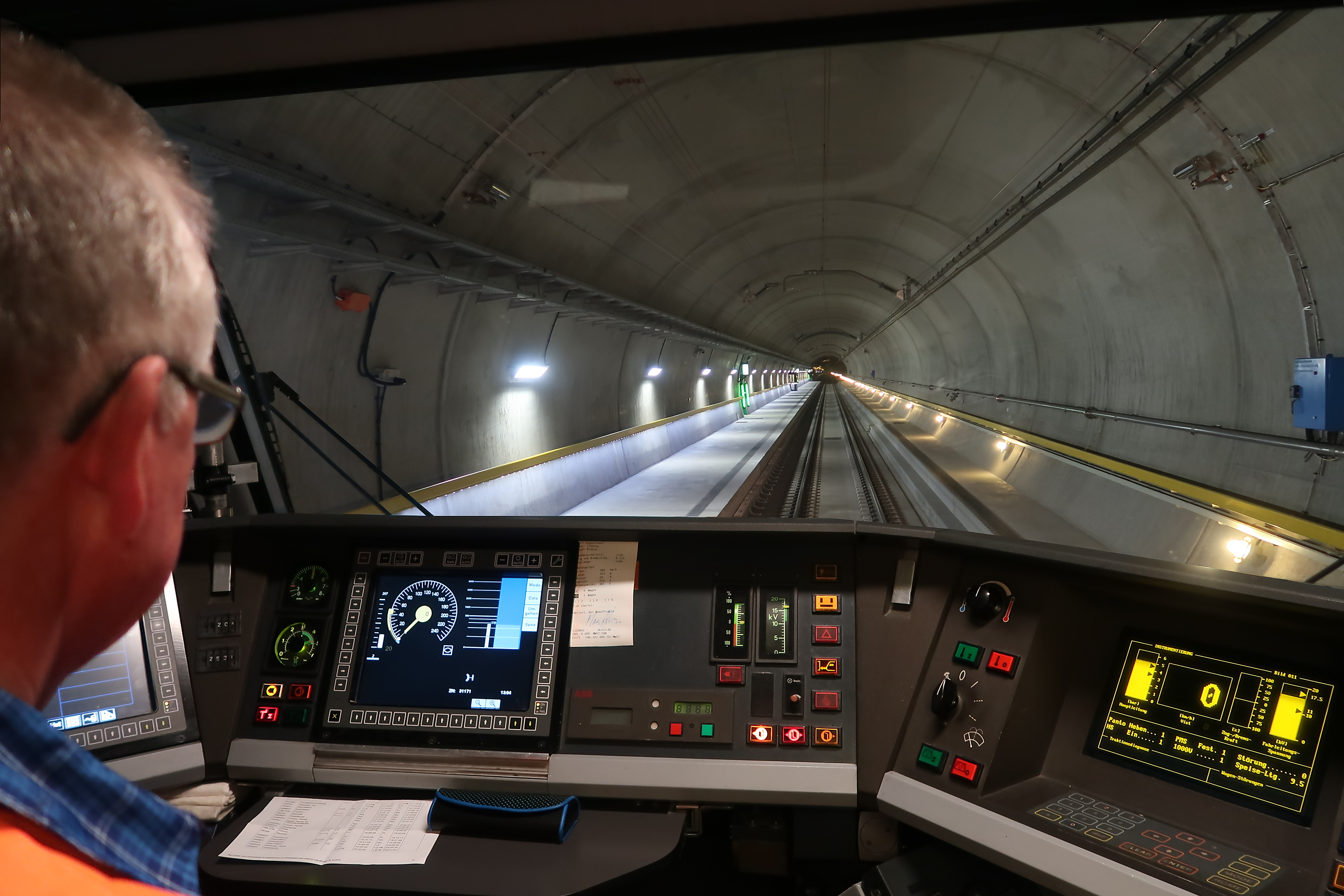
Sedrun multifunction station viewed from the control cab of a Gottardino train.

The tunnel was officially inaugurated on 1 June 2016. At the northern entrance in Erstfeld, President of the Confederation Johann Schneider-Ammann spoke of a "giant step for Switzerland but equally for our neighbours and the rest of the continent", while a live relay carried a speech given by Transport Minister Doris Leuthard at the southern entrance in Bodio. The first journey carried hundreds of Swiss citizens who had won tickets in a draw, while the assembled guests in Erstfeld, including the Federal Council in corpore, heads of state and government from neighbouring countries and transport ministers from European countries, attended the opening show Sacre del Gottardo by Volker Hesse featuring 600 dancers, acrobats, singers and musicians celebrating Alpine culture and myths around the Gotthard. On the following weekend, popular festivities and special exhibitions, attended by more than 100,000 visitors, were held.

From 2 August to 27 November 2016, the Swiss Federal Railways ran a special train service through the tunnel called "Gottardino" which was open to the public. It was a once-daily service from Flüelen railway station to Biasca railway station and in reverse. The trains made a stop inside the tunnel, to allow passengers to visit an exhibition inside the underground multifunction station in Sedrun which would normally be used in emergency only.

=== Regular services ===
Announcement before entering the GBT

During 2016, the GBT was tested extensively before its integration into the regular schedule on 11 December. On 5 December, the Swiss Federal Railways were granted permission from the Federal Transport Office to use the new base line. While the base tunnel is used for InterCity trains (ICN) and EuroCity trains (EC), the vertex line remains in use for regional trains. Since 2019, the Gotthard axis is served by the Stadler EC250 (Giruno) high-speed train and future flagship of the SBB fleet.

From the Amsteg portal, guided tours are organised inside the Gotthard Base Tunnel complex. A window allows visitors to watch the trains running in the tunnel.

=== 2023–2024 derailment and closure ===
On 10 August 2023, a freight train derailed while traveling through the tunnel, causing extensive damage to the tunnel infrastructure. The incident occurred near the multi-functional station of Faido, in the canton of Ticino. No one was injured, and no hazardous materials were released. However, the tunnel had to be fully closed to both passenger and freight traffic for repairs. It returned to normal service over a year later on 2 September 2024.

== Politics ==
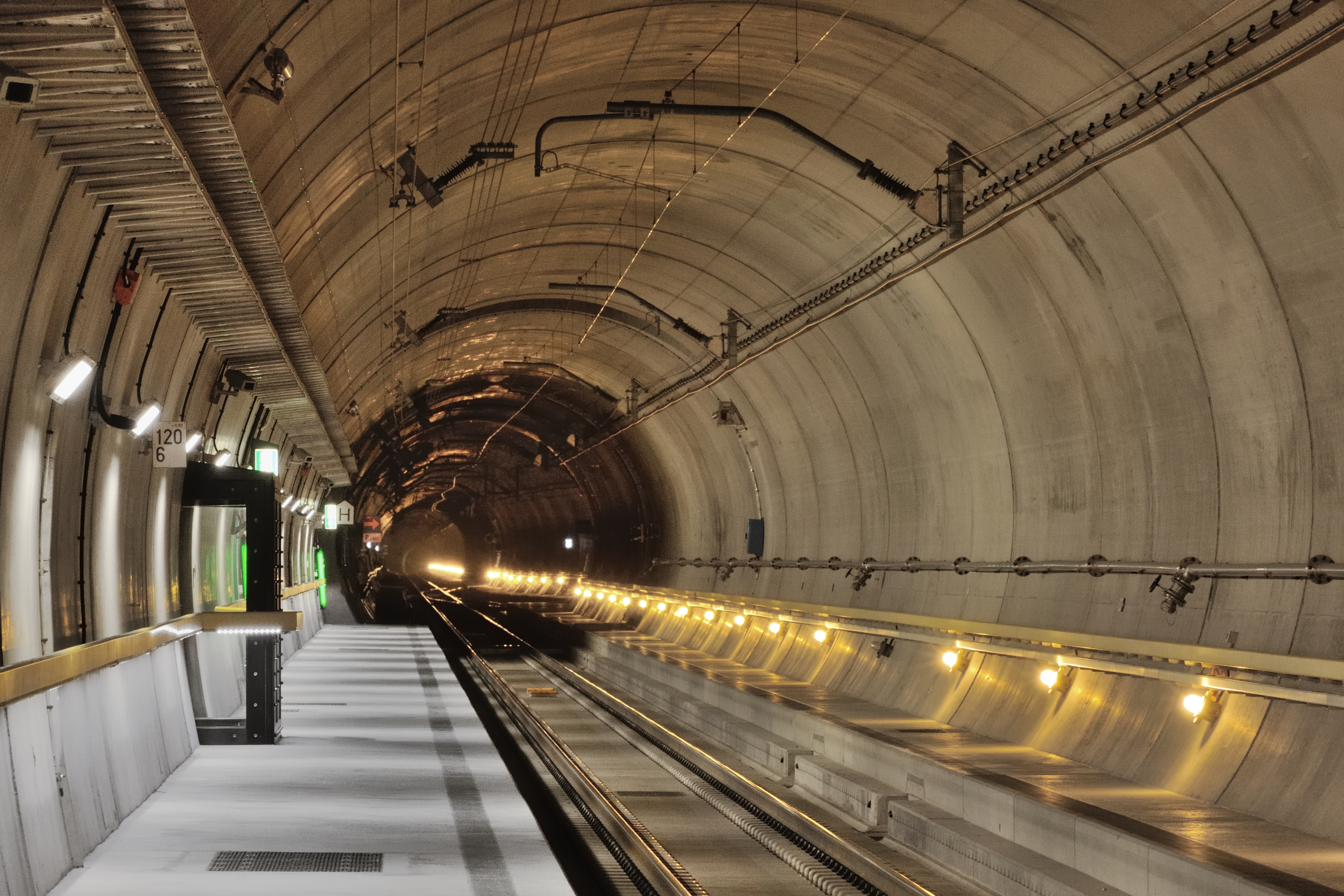
This access at Sedrun was to have served the Porta Alpina station in the middle of the tunnel. The project was abandoned for cost reasons.

The realization of the GBT, as the centrepiece of the NRLA, is also a prototypical example of direct democracy in Switzerland. In order to accomplish this mega-project the political institutions also had to overcome many parliamentary sessions and several major popular votes, including the following:

- 27 September 1992, NRLA proposal (mandatory referendum): The final proposal by the Federal Council was accepted by 63.6% yes votes (declined by 1+2/2 cantons, turnout 45.9%)
- 20 February 1994, Alps Initiative (federal popular initiative): Initiated by a few private people with the goal to protect the Alpine environment from the negative impact of traffic was accepted by 51.9% yes votes (declined by 7 cantons, turnout 41%). The initiative was accepted despite the recommendation by the Federal Council from 12 February 1992 to decline the initiative without any counterproposal, and despite the parliamentary recommendation (both chambers) from 18 June 1993 to decline the initiative.
- 29 November 1998, Public Transport Funding (mandatory referendum): A total budget of CHF 30 billion for several public transport projects was accepted by 63.5% yes votes (declined by 1+3/2 cantons, turnout 38.3%); "the NRLA is to receive CHF 13.6 billion"
- 21 May 2000, Bilateral EU Agreements / 40-tonne Trucks / Heavy Traffic Fee (optional referendum): As part of a whole package of several bilateral agreements with the EU the Swiss also accepted by 67.2% yes votes (declined by 2 cantons, turnout 48.3%) the shift of an upper limit for trucks from 28 tonnes (62 thousand pounds) to 40 tonnes (88 thousand pounds), but at the same time the EU agreed to a new heavy-traffic fee, which would also be used to finance the NRLA
- 17 December 2003, Ceneri Base Tunnel (parliamentary session): The controversial funding of the Ceneri Base Tunnel was finally passed by parliamentary approval only; the possibility for an optional referendum was not raised by any political groups, nor by the public. The then-in-charge transport minister, Federal Councilor Moritz Leuenberger, was quoted as saying "This is the only way to make the railway [the Gotthard axis] a flat line between Basel and Chiasso."

== Figures ==
- Diameter of each of the single-track tubes: 8.83–9.58 m (29.0–31.4 ft)
- Distance between cross passage tubes: ca. 325 m (1,066 ft)
- Numbers of cross passage tubes: 178
- Maximum rock overlay: 2,450 m (8,040 ft) (at Piz Vatgira)
- Start of construction: 1993 (sounding drills), 1996 (preparations), 4 November 1999 (official start, first blasting), 2003 (mechanical excavation)
- Breakthrough: 15 October 2010 (Eastern tube), 23 March 2011 (Western tube)
- Commissioning: May 2016
- Inauguration/opening: 1 June 2016
- Start of daily passenger service: 11 December 2016 (see public transport timetable#Switzerland)
- Total cost: CHF 9.560 billion (as of December 2015)
- Travel time: Passenger trains – 20 minutes
- Amount of excavated rock: 28,200,000 t (31,100,000 short tons; 27,800,000 long tons), 13,300,000 m^{3} or 17,400,000 cu yd, the equivalent of 5 Giza pyramids
- Number of tunnel boring machines (TBM): Four Herrenknecht Gripper TBMs. Machine numbers S-210 and S-211 operated northbound from Giornico to Faido and Sedrun and were nicknamed Sissi and Heidi respectively; Machines S-229 and S-230 operated southbound from Erstfeld to Sedrun and were known as Gabi I and Gabi II.
  - Total length: 440 m (1,440 ft) (including back-up equipment)
  - Total weight: 3,000 t (3,300 short tons; 3,000 long tons)
  - Power: 5 MW
  - Max. excavation daily: 25–30 m (82–98 ft) (in excellent rock conditions)
  - Total excavation length by TBM: about 45 km (28 mi) (for each tube)
  - Manufacturer: Herrenknecht, Schwanau, Germany
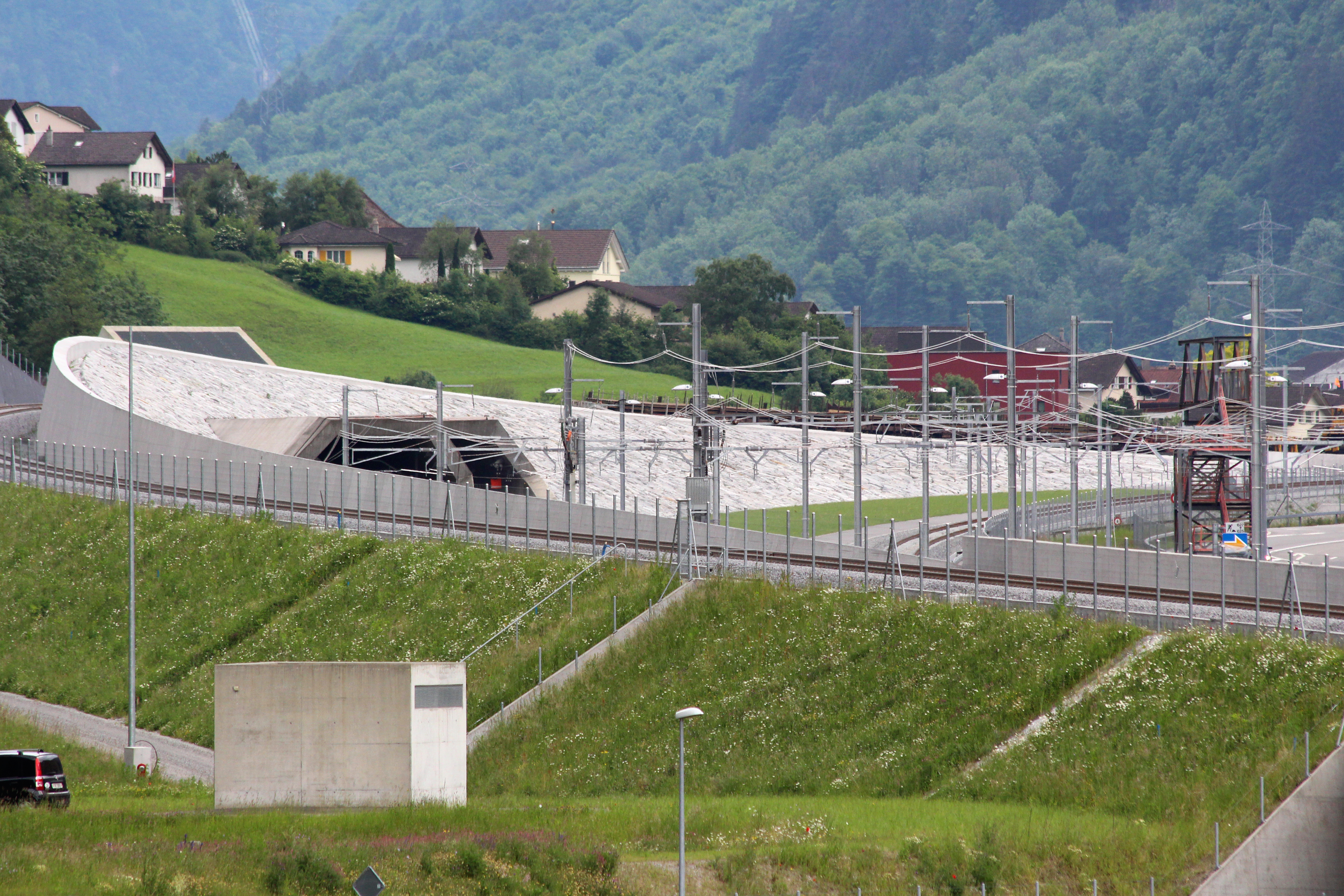
Integration of the portals into the landscape

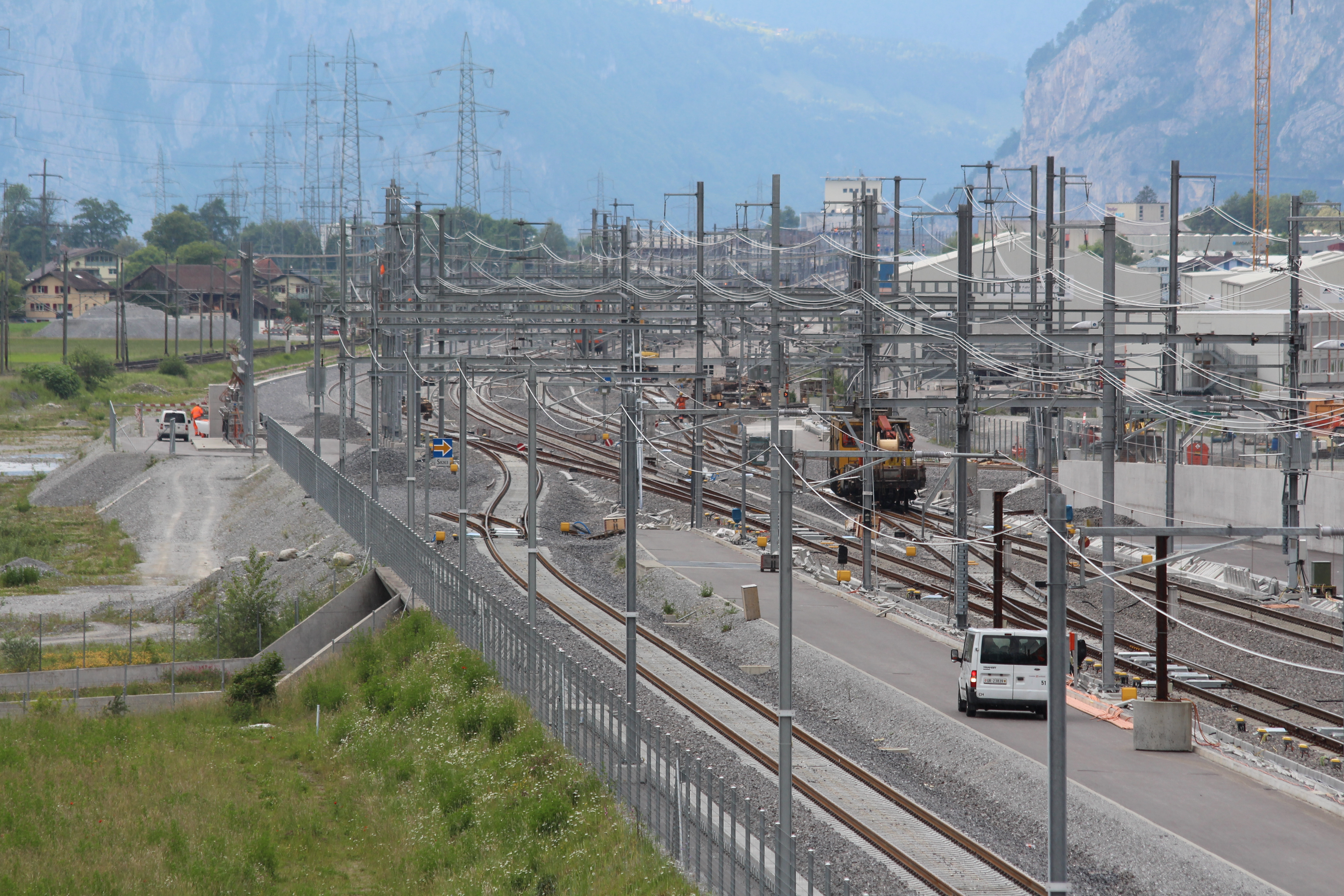
The new 4-kilometre-long (2.5 mi) open-air section from Rynächt to the north portal

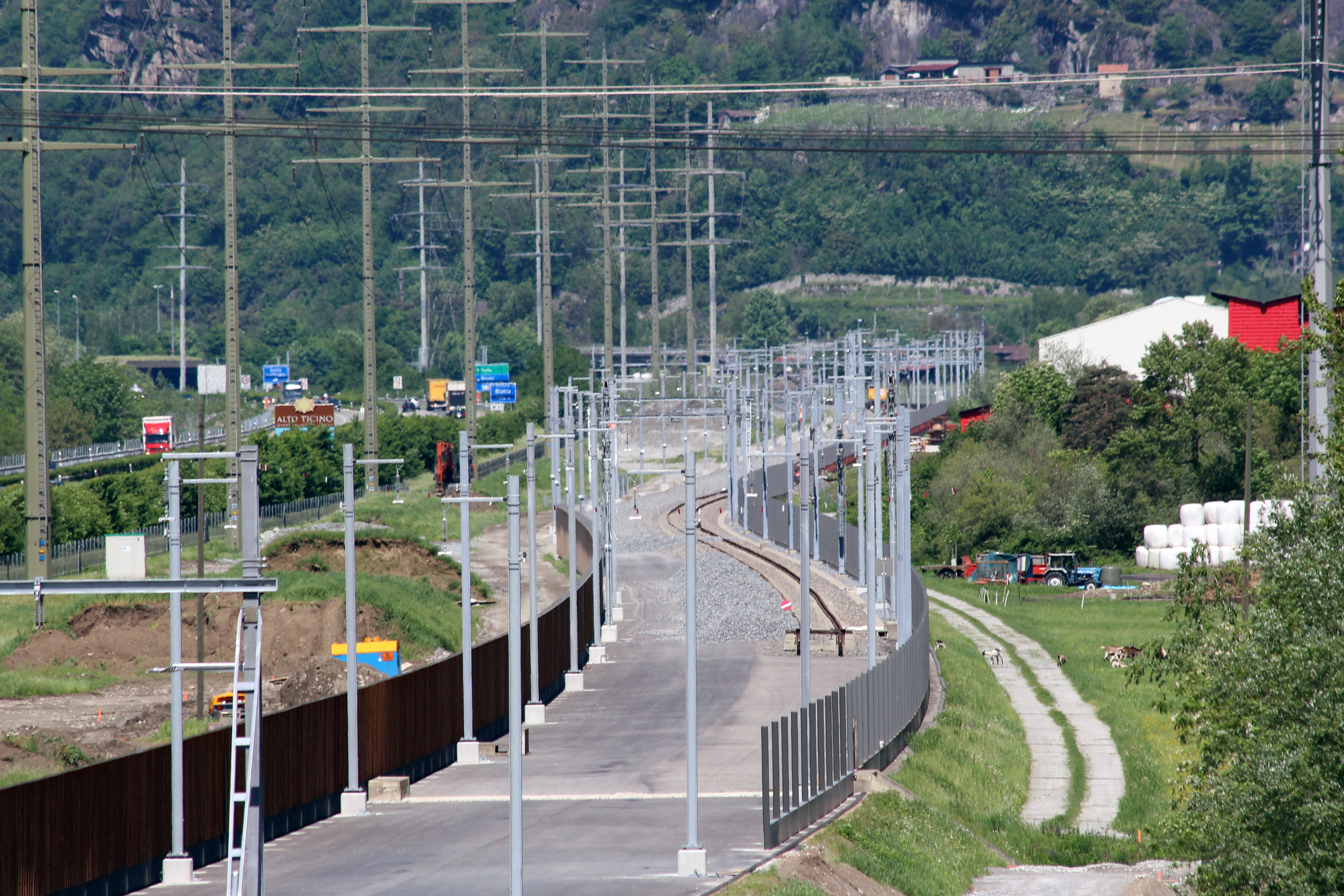
Start of the new 7-kilometre-long (4.3 mi) open-air section from Giustizia to the south portal

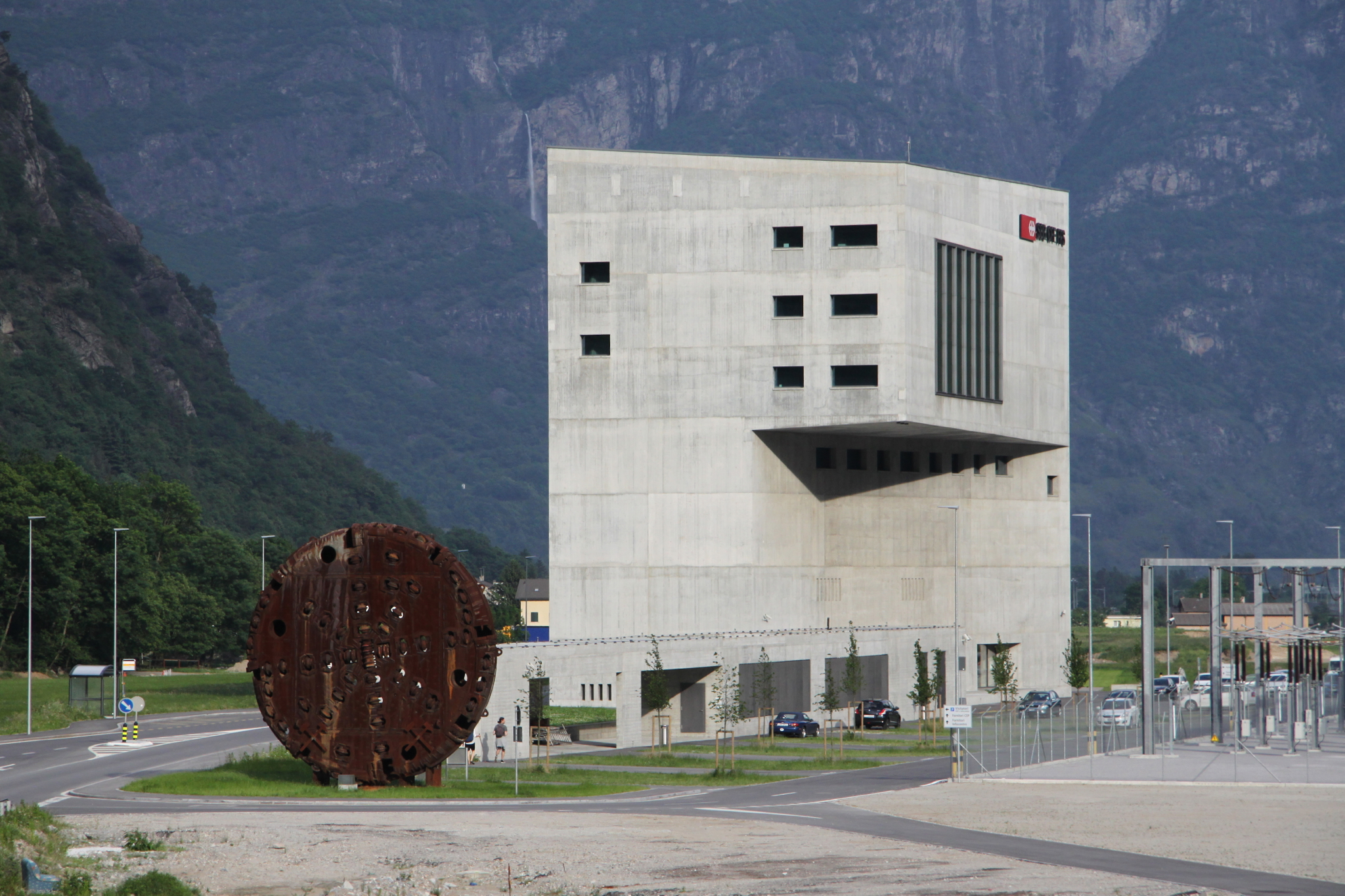
The Pollegio Control Centre (near the south portal) with one of the four used TBM cutter heads on display

== Operation ==
=== Reduced travel times ===
Reduced travel times by passenger trains
	Shortest journey time by train			Time saved
	vertex route		through GBT	Time saved
	2006	2016	2022	Time saved
Milano – Zurich	4:26 (EC) / 3:41 (CIS)	4:03 (EC)	3:17 (EC)	1:09 / :24 / :46
Lugano – Zurich	2:56 (EC/IC) / 2:42 (CIS)	2:41 (ICN)	1:53 (IC2/IC21)	1:03 / :49 / :48

=== Safety ===
The safety requirements on the rolling stock are similar to those of other long Swiss tunnels, including the ability for the emergency brake to be overridden.

One simulation indicates that ground surface displacements are primarily caused by water drainage induced by the tunnel and the consolidation of surrounding rock masses in the deep subsurface. Additionally, its findings suggest that the construction of the tunnel could lead to fault shearing due to the diffusion of pressure from drainage and resulting poroelastic stresses.

== 2023 freight train derailment ==
On 10 August 2023, a freight train heading north derailed inside the tunnel, damaging around 8 km (5.0 mi) of tracks, 20,000 concrete sleepers, and a lane change gate that separates the tunnel's two tubes. Both tubes were closed to traffic. Trains scheduled to use the tunnel were cancelled or redirected to the "panorama route" which added about one to two hours to journeys. Since the alternate route was unable to accommodate bi-level equipment, passenger capacity was reduced by around two-thirds.

Experts from the Swiss Transportation Safety Investigation Board (STSB) were dispatched to the site to preserve and document evidence of the crash. Investigators found fragments of a wheel and signs of derailment several kilometers before the crash site. At the Faido station, they discovered a pile of derailed wagons. The STSB's mission is to determine the causes of accidents to ensure or improve safety, rather than to assign guilt or responsibility. The STSB believes that the derailment was likely caused by a broken wheel tread inside the tunnel. All fragments of the wheel were found, consisting of several large pieces. The cause of the breakage has not yet been determined. External influence or fatigue fracture are possible explanations. The wheel fragments will be subjected to metallurgical analysis to determine the cause. Despite the broken wheel, the wagon was dragged by the train for several kilometers. At the switching point of the multi-functional station, where trains can switch between the two tubes of the tunnel, the wagon derailed, pulling more than 20 following wagons off the tracks.

The tunnel's repair work was extensive. Originally expected to be completed by the end of 2023, it was announced in November 2023 that the repairs would not be finished before September 2024, with the tunnel operating at reduced capacity until then. This was due to repairs requiring a complete replacement of seven kilometers of rails, including 20,000 sleeper blocks and their concrete foundations, a damaged lane-change gate, two high-speed switches and many other safety and operationally relevant parts. Freight trains were allowed to use the east tunnel from 23 August due to a temporary maintenance gate replacing the damaged one whilst passenger services remained rerouted.

Freight capacity in the tunnel was gradually increased on weekdays, while passenger services saw expansion on weekends. In case of emergency, passengers would be evacuated through the other tunnel tube. Following the reopening of the undamaged northern third of the western tube, additional freight and passenger services were scheduled to use the tunnel, with a full reopening and a return to normal service commencing on 2 September 2024.

== Traffic ==
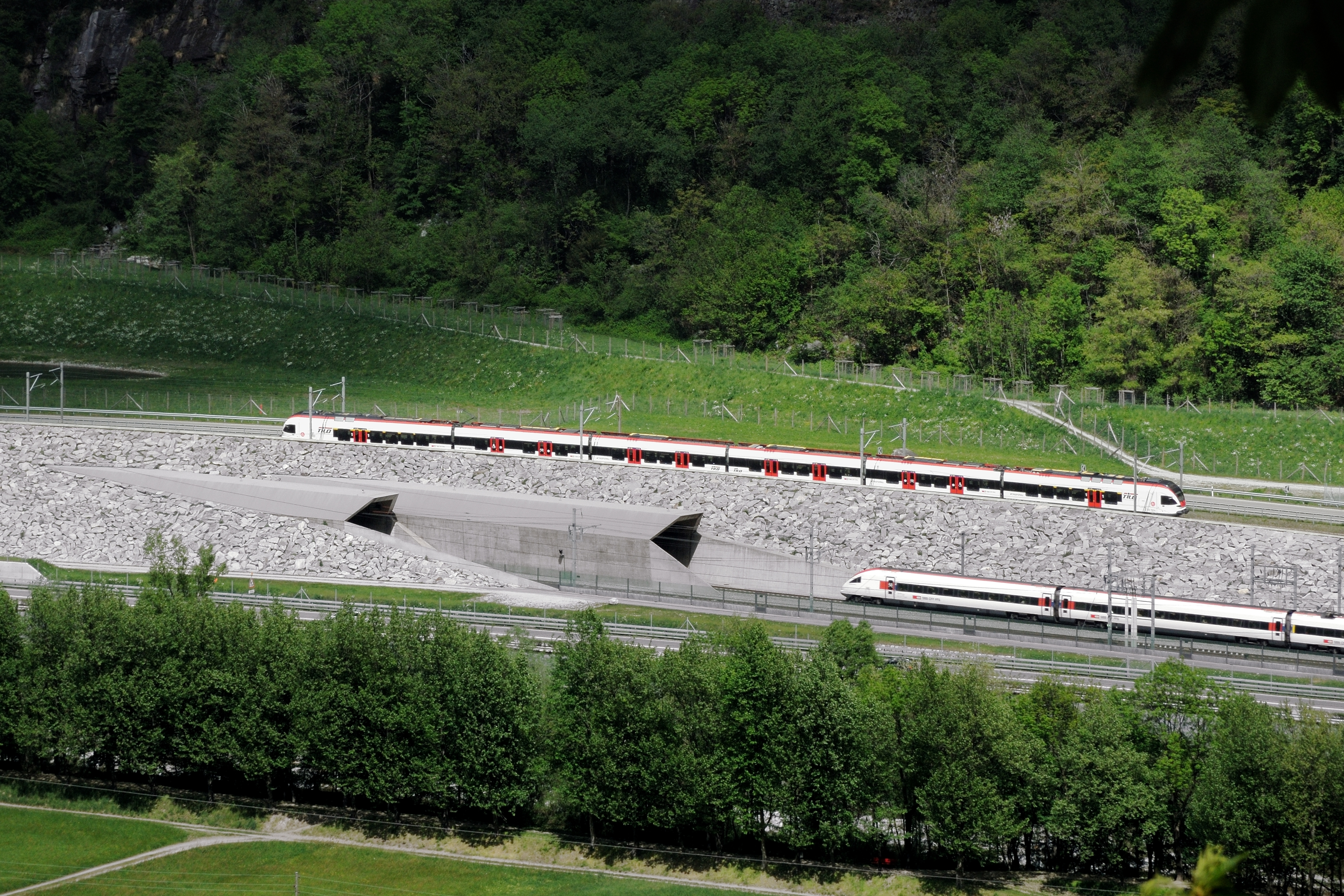
South portal: Intercity on the base line and regional train on the vertex line

Since the opening date on 1 June 2016, between 130 and 160 trains on an average working day operated through the Gotthard Base Tunnel, which in March 2019 marked the 100,000th transit. Around two-thirds of the passages were freight trains and the remaining quota were passenger trains, both national and international.

=== Projections ===
The number of projected trains per day was 180–260 freight trains and 50 (65 from 2020) passenger trains.

=== Passengers ===
After the opening of the tunnel there was an increase in passengers crossing the trans-alpine line, with 2.3 million passengers in the first 8 months, an increase of 30% over the previous year.

In August 2017, an average of 10,400 people crossed the tunnel daily. Train services from Italy to Switzerland through the line are expected to become faster from 2020, with the opening of the Ceneri Base Tunnel, with an expected further increase in passenger numbers. There are plans for a train service between Zurich and Milan with a journey time of 2:45 hours, down from 3:50 hours.

=== Freight ===
67,000 tonnes (150 million pounds) on 120 trains passed through the tunnel each day during the first half year of operation.

== See also ==
- Brenner Base Tunnel – Railway under construction through the Alps
- Mont d'Ambin Base Tunnel, a planned base tunnel that will be slightly longer than the GBT.
- Rail transport in Switzerland
- High-speed rail in Switzerland
- List of tunnels in Switzerland
- List of tunnels in the Alps
- List of tunnels by country
- List of transport megaprojects

== Notes ==
Records
Preceded by Seikan Tunnel	World's longest railway tunnel 2016–present	Current holder
