= Fulen =

Fulen may refer to mountains:

- Fulen (2490 m), a peak of the Schwyz Alps, east of Urnersee and right next to the Rossstock, Switzerland
- Fulen (2415 m), a peak of the Glarus Alps, east of Sernftal and right south of the Wyssgandstöckli on the border between canton of Glarus and St. Gallen, Switzerland
- Fulen (2410 m), second highest peak of the Mürtschenstock, part of the Glarus Alps, Switzerland
- Fulen (2057 m), a peak of the Uri Alps, west of Urnersee and north of the Uri Rotstock, Switzerland
- Bös Fulen (2802 m), a mountain of the Schwyz Alps, highest mountain of canton of Schwyz, on the border between cantons of Schwyz and Glarus, Switzerland
- Chli Fulen (2335 m) and Hoch Fulen (2506 m), mountains of the Glarus Alps, in canton of Uri, Switzerland
