= Chrüzlistock =

Mountain in Switzerland

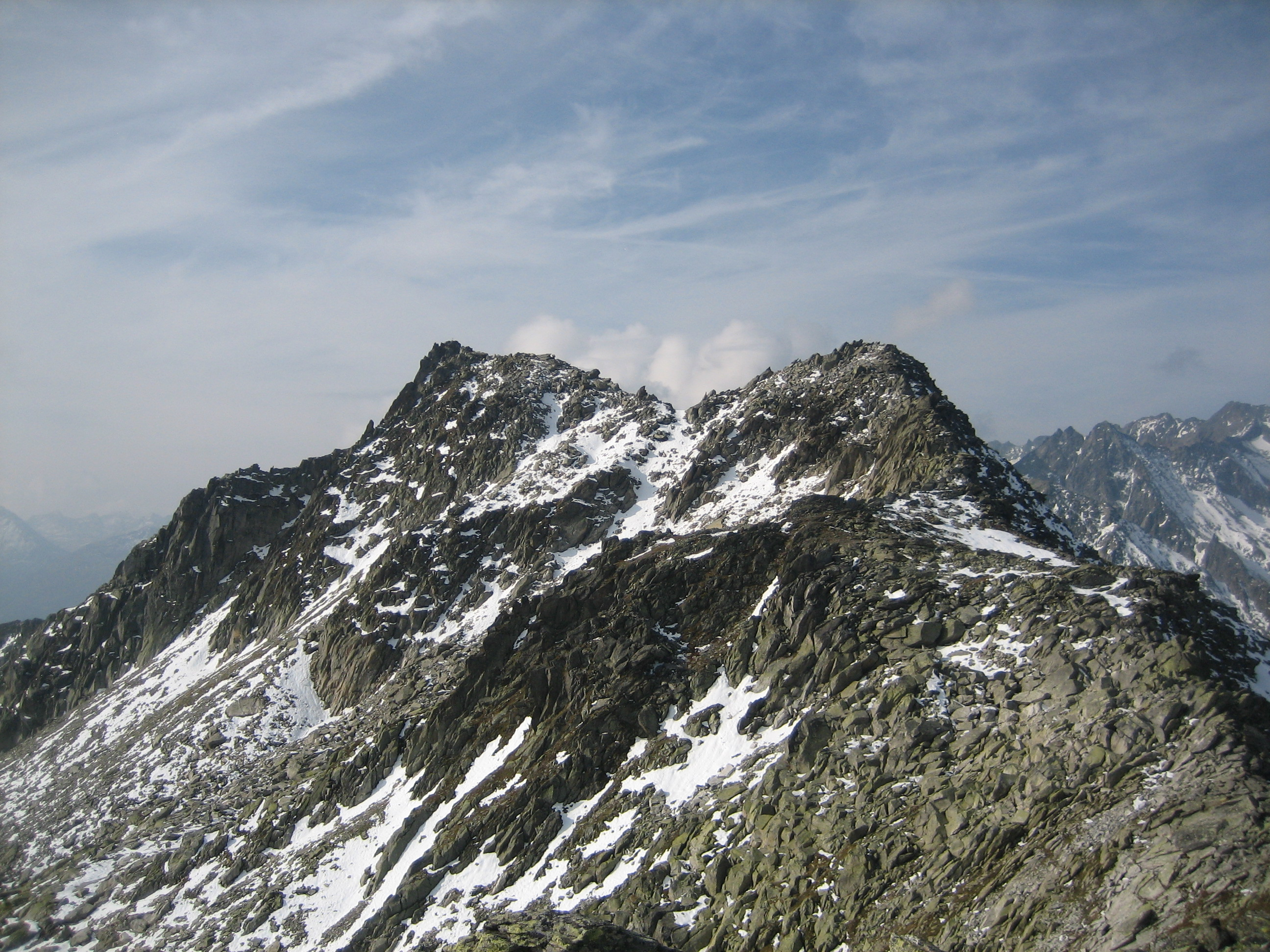
- Chrüzlistock from NE

Highest point
- Peak: unnamed
- Elevation: 2,717 m (8,914 ft)
- Prominence: 245 m (804 ft)
- Parent peak: Piz Giuv
- Coordinates: 46°42′52″N 8°44′27″E

Naming
- English translation: Small Cross (as a diminutive) Stem
- Language of name: Swiss German

Geography
- Location within Switzerland
- Country: Switzerland
- Canton: Uri and Graubünden
- Parent range: Glarus Alps
- Topo map: Swiss Federal Office of Topography swisstopo

Climbing
- Easiest route: From Chrüzlipass

The Chrüzlistock is a mountain of the Glarus Alps, located north of Sedrun on the border between the Swiss canton of Graubünden and Uri. The southern unnamed summit has an elevation of 2,717 metres (8,914 ft) and the northern summit, which is the named peak and is located on the cantonal border, has an elevation of 2,709 metres (8,888 ft).

It derives its name from the historic pass at its northeastern hillside, the Chrüzlipass.

The Chrüzlistock is, along with Piz Vatgira and Pizzo dell'Uomo, one of the main peaks traversed by the Gotthard Base Tunnel. The tunnel runs below the summit Chrüzlistock, or more precisely, just east of it.
