= Bälmeten =

Mountain in Switzerland

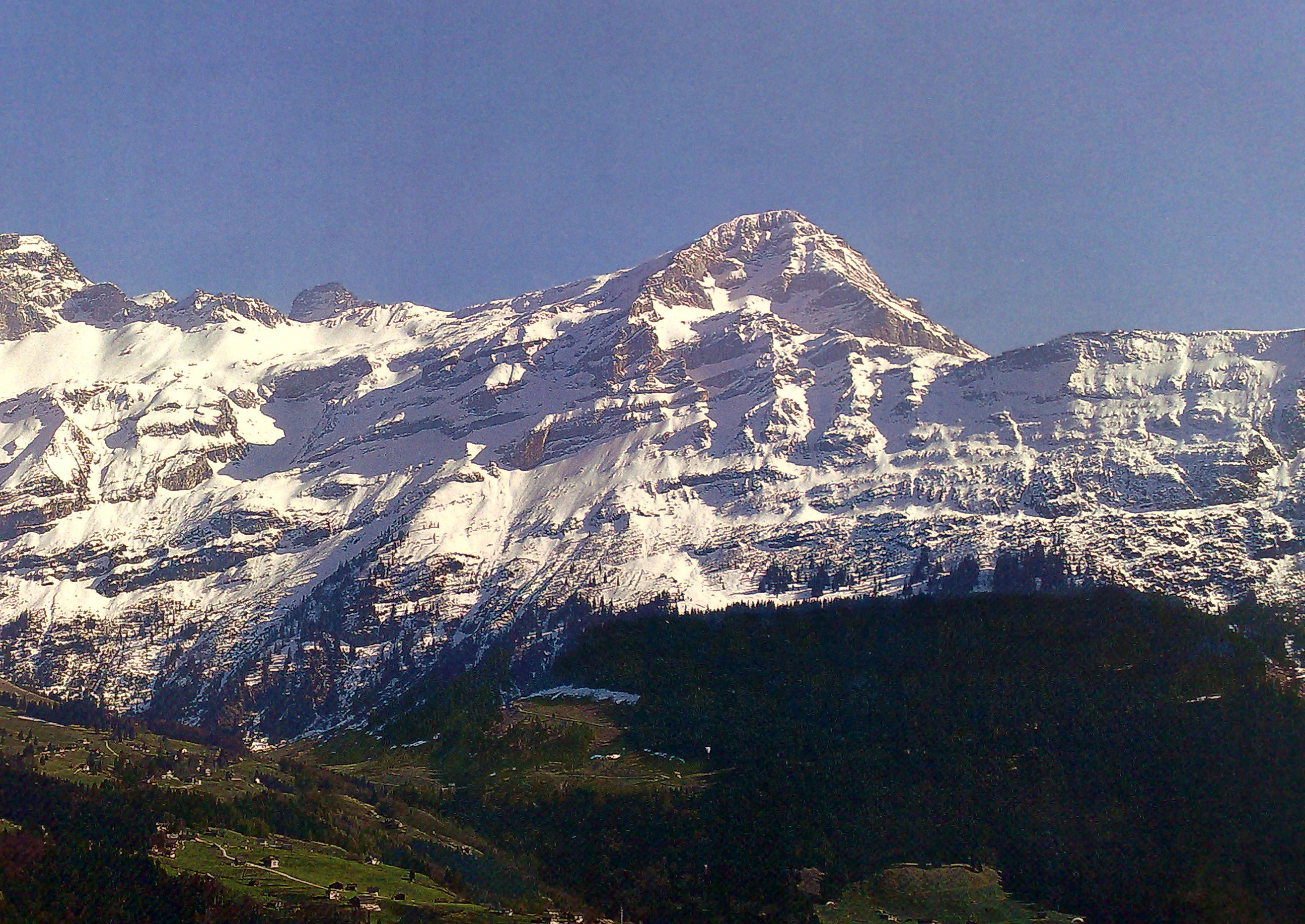
- The north side

Highest point
- Elevation: 2,416 m (7,927 ft)
- Prominence: 164 m (538 ft)
- Parent peak: Hoch Fulen
- Coordinates: 46°49′51″N 8°40′51″E

Geography
- Location within Switzerland
- Location: Uri, Switzerland
- Parent range: Glarus Alps

The Bälmeten (2,416 m) is a mountain of the Glarus Alps, overlooking Erstfeld in the canton of Uri. It lies west of the Hoch Fulen, in the group north-west of the Gross Windgällen.
