= Hoch Fulen =

Mountain in Switzerland

- Location within Switzerland

Highest point
- Elevation: 2,506 m (8,222 ft)
- Prominence: 261 m (856 ft)
- Parent peak: Schwarz Stöckli
- Coordinates: 46°49′52″N 8°42′21″E

Naming
- English translation: Tall Fulen
- Language of name: German

Geography
- Location: Uri
- Country: Switzerland
- Parent range: Glarus Alps
- Topo map: Swiss Federal Office of Topography swisstopo

The Hoch Fulen is a mountain of the Glarus Alps, located east of Erstfeld in the Uri. It lies in the group north-west of the Gross Windgällen, between the Reuss valley and the Schächental.
