= Witenalpstock =

Mountain in Switzerland

- Location within Switzerland

Highest point
- Elevation: 3,016 m (9,895 ft)
- Prominence: 266 m (873 ft)
- Parent peak: Oberalpstock
- Coordinates: 46°44′9.7″N 8°44′50.5″E

Geography
- Location: Uri/Graubünden, Switzerland
- Parent range: Glarus Alps

The Witenalpstock is a mountain of the Glarus Alps, located on the border between the Swiss cantons of Uri and Graubünden. It lies west of the Oberalpstock, between the Etzlital and the Val Strem.
