= Pizzo del Sole =

Mountain of the Swiss Lepontine Alps

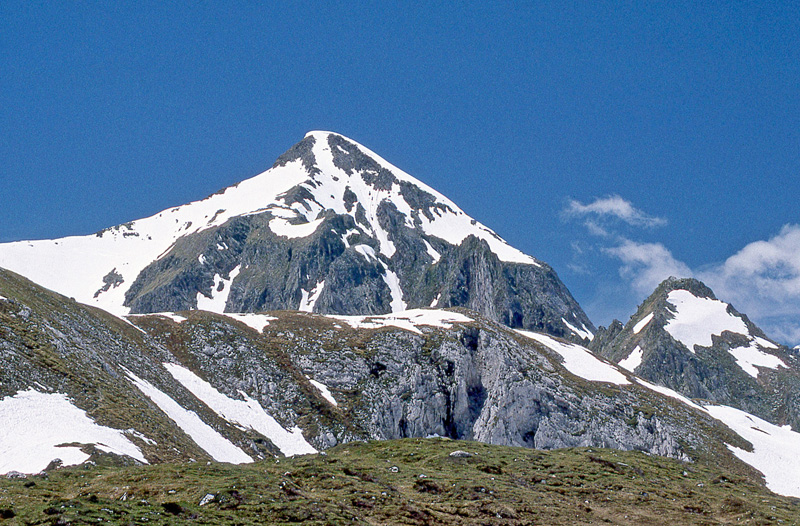

Highest point
- Elevation: 2,773 m (9,098 ft)
- Prominence: 555 m (1,821 ft)
- Parent peak: Piz Gannaretsch
- Coordinates: 46°31′30.6″N 8°46′4.4″E

Geography
- Location within Switzerland
- Location: Ticino, Switzerland
- Parent range: Lepontine Alps

The Pizzo del Sole is a mountain of the Lepontine Alps in the Swiss canton of Ticino. With a height of 2,773 metres, it is the highest point of the Val Piora. On its southern side are located the lakes of Chiéra.
