= Saint-Gotthard Massif =

Mountain range in Switzerland

Coordinates: 46°38′28″N 8°25′06″E

Gotthard Massif
- German: Gotthardmassiv
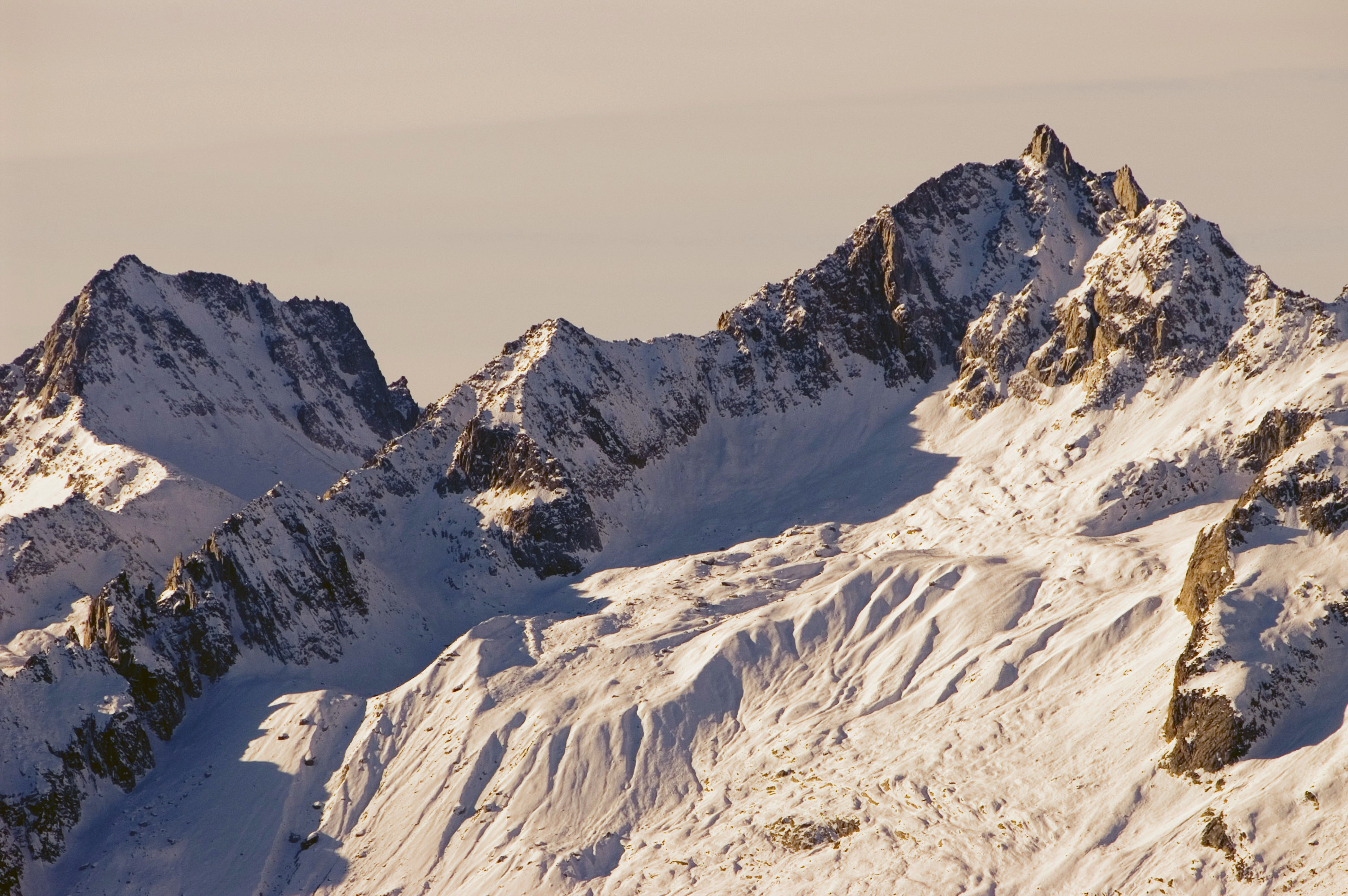
- Pizzo Rotondo

Highest point
- Peak: Pizzo Rotondo
- Elevation: 3,192 m (10,472 ft)

Dimensions
- Length: 30 km (19 mi)

Geography
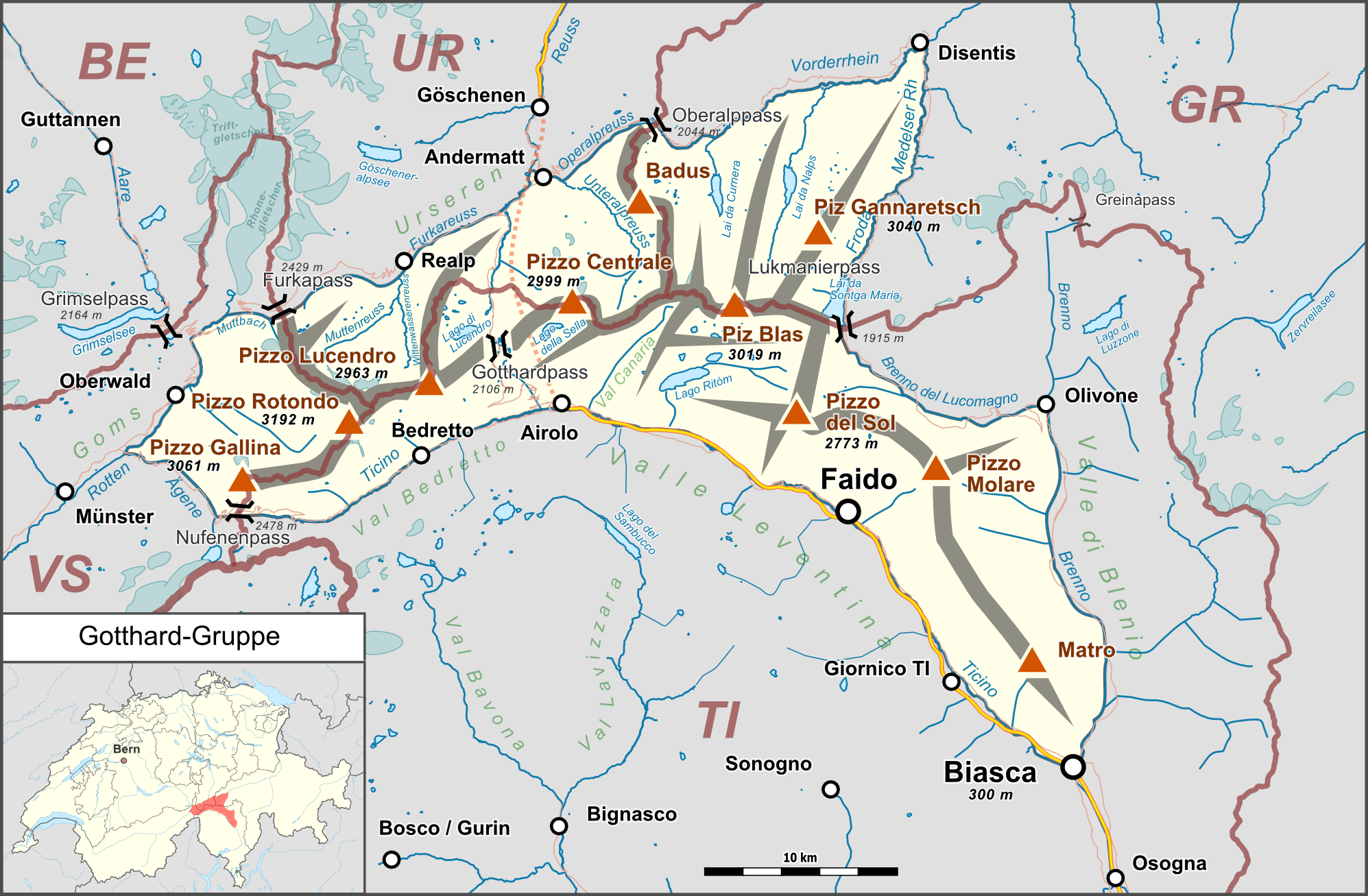
- Country: Switzerland
- Cantons: Graubünden, Ticino, Uri and Valais
- Parent range: Lepontine Alps
- Borders on: Bernese Alps, Uri Alps and Glarus Alps

The Gotthard Massif or Saint-Gotthard Massif (German: Gotthardmassiv or Sankt-Gotthard-Massiv; Italian: Massiccio del San Gottardo; Romansh: Massiv dal Gottard) is a mountain range in the Alps in Switzerland, located at the border of four cantons: Valais, Ticino, Uri and Graubünden. It is delimited by the Nufenen Pass on the west, by the Furka Pass and the Oberalp Pass on the north and by the Lukmanier Pass on the east. The eponymous Gotthard Pass, lying at the heart of the massif, is the main route from north to south (excluding tunnels).

The region of the Gotthard lies at the heart of the Swiss Alps, often referred to as the "water tower of Europe". Three major rivers take their source in the Gotthard Massif: the Reuss, Rhine and Ticino. A fourth river, the Rhône, takes its source in very close proximity of the massif, just north of the Furka Pass. A trekking itinerary, the Vier-Quellen-Weg ("four springs trail"), crosses the Gotthard Massif.

== Peaks ==
The highest peaks of the massif are Pizzo Rotondo (3,192 m) in the southwest, Pizzo Centrale (2,999 m) near the centre and Piz Gannaretsch (3,040 m) in the northeast. There is no peak named Gotthard.

== Tunnels ==
There are three long tunnels traversing the Gotthard Massif:

- Gotthard (Rail) Tunnel, railway culmination tunnel (1882, 15 km)
- Gotthard Road Tunnel, motorway tunnel (1980, 17 km)
- Gotthard Base Tunnel, railway lowest-level tunnel (2016, 57 km)
