= Valle Maggia =

Valley in Switzerland

Coordinates: 46.25°N 8.7°E

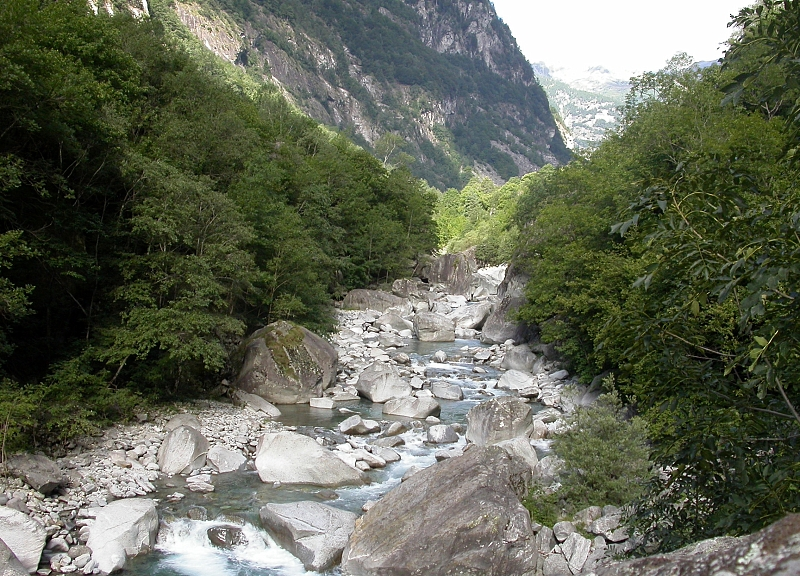
Valle Maggia with the Maggia

Valle Maggia (English, "Maggia Valley") is an alpine valley in the Vallemaggia district of canton of Ticino, the Italian-speaking canton of Switzerland. The valley is formed by the river Maggia and is situated between the Centovalli and Lago Maggiore as well as the Valle Verzasca in the East.

== Geography ==
The Maggia valley has a spatial extension of 569.64 km^{2} (219.94 mi^{2}), equal to one-fifth of the canton of Ticino. It is the largest valley of the canton and one of the widest within the Alps' south side. The valley is formed by the river Maggia, whose source is the Cristallina peak in Val Sambuco (Lavizzara). The river runs through the valley down to Ascona, where it pours into the Lake Maggiore. The Maggia is fed by the rivers Melezza, Rovana (river) and Bavona, as well as other mountain streams, and can swell up to a current after torrential rains, even though its force has been regulated by numerous upstream dams and reservoirs. Over time, the river has flooded and eroded valuable areas of cultivation, partly due to extensive woodcutting, so the lower Maggia valley is broad, but it is flanked by steep granite walls.

The Maggia valley in its strict sense extends from Ponte Brolla in the South to Bignasco in the North.

Going North the first side valley is Northeast of the village of Maggia, the Valle del Salto. The next side valley is the short Valle di Lodano. The next tributary to the Maggia from the West is the Rovana which joins in Cevio. Upstream it forms the Val Rovana, which at Cerentino leads up into Valle di Bosco/Gurin and Valle di Campo.

The upper Maggia valley beyond Bignasco splits into two dead ends, the two major glacial troughs of Val Bavona in the West and Val Lavizzara in the East. The latter is, in turn, divided in the side valleys of Valle di Peccia in the West, Val di Prato in the East as cul-de sacs, and Val Sambuco. The side valley West of Val Bavona is the Val Canegia.

To the Southwest of the Maggia Valley are Valle Onsernone and Centovalli. Parallelling the Maggia Valley in the East is the Valle Verzasca.

The geographical configuration of the Maggia valley's territory goes from 254 m (833 ft) above sea level of Ponte Brolla to 3,272 m (10,735 ft) above s.l. of the Basòdino peak, with a height difference equal to 3,000 m (9,800 ft) in just 33.4 km (20.8 mi) as the crow flies.

== Climate ==
Because of its low altitude, temperatures are mild with a nearly Mediterranean climate, allowing palm trees to grow year round. Oaks and chestnuts grow up to an altitude of 1000 metres. Beyond 1000 metres, vegetation becomes more and more alpine and deciduous trees giving way to conifers and tundra plants.

== History ==
Finds from the Copper Age prove that the valley was settled at least since then. During Roman times (late Latène and Augustan period) a sparse population was distributed in the entire Valley, probably oriented towards the Vicus Muralto. It is assumed that the valley's cultural landscape of terraces, planting of chestnuts and walnut trees may have begun during Roman times. The valley bottom was certainly populated by groups of Gauls (Maggia is a Gallic name) during the Iron Age. Roman tombs have been found in Avegno, Gordevio, Aurigeno, Moghegno, Cevio and Maggia.

During the Middle Ages the Longobards reached Locarno and started dominating the valley under the feudal government of Capitanei. It is in this period that Christianism spreads and the church of San Vittore in Muralto was founded. Thereafter Maggia, Sornico and Cevio became independent parishes. Gradually, the individual neighborhoods organized in larger units.

In the 14th century, Bignasco, Cavergno, Brontallo and Menzonio formed an administrative unit, as did the villages of Val Lavizzara and Val Rovana (Cevio, Cavergno, Campo, Cerentino and Bosco were the Roana Superior). In 1398, the Vallemaggia, the Verzasca Valley and Mergoscia refused to pay royalties to the Locarno nobility, who had fiefs in these regions; In 1403, the valleys formally separated from Locarno and founded an independent judicial district with a 42-member general council and own land law (statuti) centered in Cevio; various conflicts between the local valleys characterized their coexistence. In 1403/04, the dispute between the communities of the lower valley and Cevio ended with a contract. From 1411 to 1412, the Valley tried to evade the Duchy of Milan and joined the Savoyards. In 1416, the Confederates occupied the valley. They returned it to Milan in 1422 and finally to the Rusca family in 1439. Around 1430, the Lavizzaratal valley was legally separated from Valle Maggia.

In 1513, the Helvetians occupied the valley, and for the next 300 years, from 1513 to 1798, Vallemaggia was one of the bailiwicks of the twelve Helvetian cantons; its German name was "Meiental" or "Mainthal". It was divided into the two valleys of Vallemaggia and Lavizzara, but only one fiscal head and one chief officiated and only for 2 years each; The latter chose his place of residence (in Cevio or Sornico) himself, but had to regularly reside in the other main town to assess the litigation, in difficult cases with the help of local judges. The Valle Lavizzara defended its self-reliance against Vallemaggia. It sabotaged the attempts of some of the bailiffs and of the annual accounts statute to settle the court centrally in Cevio or to overturn the directors.

When the Helvetian Republic was founded in 1798, the Valle Maggia became part of the Canton Lugano; In 1803, Napoleon gave the Republic a federal structure and Ticino became its own autonomous canton with Vallemaggia as its own district and Cevio as the capital.

In 1824, the first road to Bignasco is opened, in 1860 it is extended to the Valle Lavizzara, later in the Rovana until Cimalmotto in 1882, Valle Bosco after 1905 and Valle Peccia only between 1922 and 1924.

In the mid-19th century due to the storms in 1868, food shortage, economic hardship, and the gold rush many families emigrated to Australia and the Americas. Between 1840 and 1870 2000 people emigrated, manly men. Plinio Martini has described the harsh way of life in a novel called "The Bottom of the Sack".

The villages of Lodano and Giumaglio have a combined population of around 200 people as compared to 500 in the 19th century.

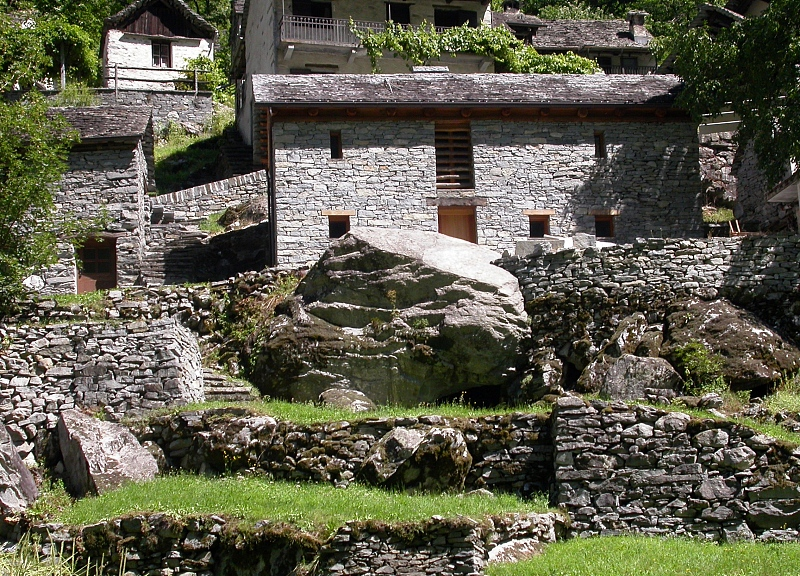
Traditional stone house

== Dialect ==
The Valmaggese dialect is part of the Lombard dialects’ family, also defined as Gallo-Italic. The background is Latin, with many Celtic elements; the dialect also presents Germanic influences, especially internalized during the Longobard rule and the Walser’s settlement in Bosco/Gurin.

== Human infrastructure, demographics, transportation ==
The largest municipality is Maggia, at 323 metres altitude. Cevio at 418 metres is the former administrative centre and Bosco/Gurin at 1503 metres the only German speaking community in Ticino in the upper Valle di Bosco/Gurin. Bignasco at 443 metres is a village at the junction of Maggia and Bavona valley.

From the Middle Ages onwards people had emigrated to Locarno and the Sottoceneri. Population probably reached its peak in the middle of the 18th century, after which a first wave of bricklayers, stonemasons, grooms, traders and artists emigrated on a seasonal basis and for longer periods of time. This mitigated population pressure and enabled relative prosperity.

Around 1850, difficult economic conditions (customs unification after the creation of the Helvetian state, reprisals by the Austrian Lombardo-Venetian Kingdom, deterioration of climatic conditions) caused seasonal or temporary up to final emigration to overseas, esp to California and Australia. The Maggia valley lost one-third of its total population. The ensuing strong depopulation of the valley and demographic imbalances (gender, aging, low fertility and high rates of singlehood) had long-term effects and triggered a further decline in agricultural productivity, which in turn led to new emigration. The most remote communities were the most affected. Only after the Second World War was there a gradual turnaround. However, the population development of the lower half of the valley, which benefited from its proximity to the economic center Locarno suburbanised in the last decades of the 20th century, much different from the more problematic development in the upper valleys. At the beginning of the 21st century, the Val Rovana, where the population had declined by 75% between 1860 and 1980, seemed to become a holiday resort, similar to the Val Bavona. The Valle Lavizzara was a little less affected by the population decline. Within the Maggia valley there's only 1,8% of the Ticinese population, even if it occupies 20% of the cantonal territory. The demographic density is, thus, very low: 9 inhabitants per square kilometre.

From 1814 to 1824 a road (via cantonale) was built from Locarno on the Lake Maggiore to Bignasco, which broke the valley's isolation. In 1907, a railway line Locarno-Ponte Brolla-Bignasco was built. It helped the development of the quarries. The railroad was closed in 1965. Hydropower from Maggia began around 1950. It achieved great economic benefits however at the expense of environmental problems. As of 2010, there were nine power plants with a total production of about 611 megawatts. The creation of jobs slowed the rural exodus.

== Economy ==
Since the Middle Ages, the economy has been based on field (cereals, potatoes and linen) and viticulture and pasture management. For many centuries cheese was exported from Valle Maggia. Forests were often overused as a resource, which polluted the environment. Crafts (wool spinning, weaving, wood processing), soapstone industry and after the second half of the 19th century quarries thrived, in which marble and a special form of gneiss (Beola) were obtained. Famous is the marble obtained from the quarry located at the end of Val di Peccia, at an altitude of 1300 metres. The marble of Peccia is a solid metamorphic limestone, weather-resistant and crystalline. It's a high-quality product and it can be used both for constructions and sculpture. The marble industry of Peccia, born in 1946, has the most of its clientele in central Switzerland and northern European countries.

Since the 1970s, tourism has gained importance, with a strong increase in the number of second homes. The Maggia valley's numerous infrastructures have led, especially, to the development of residential and hiking tourism. Skiing has a relevant importance, but this activity is mainly limited to Bosco/Gurin. The largest industries of the valley after tourism are stone quarrying and dairy production.

The hydroelectric industry Officine Idroelettriche della Maggia (OFIMA) is a large employer in the valley. It began with a concession to build the dam for the reservoir Lago del Sambuco on 10 March 1949. In the 1950s, the "Maggia 1" plants were built: Sambuco, Peccia, Cavergno and Verbano with concessions until 2035. In the 1960s the "Maggia 2" plants were built: Cavagnoli-Naret, Robiei and Bavona, the concessions of which expire in 2048. The hydroelectric Officine produce 1265 GWh of energy on average per year, generating 50 million Francs and offering a hundred jobs. Mostly underground, the hydroelectric plants stretch for 60 kilometres, from the Gries basin in Canton Valais to Brissago, on the lake Maggiore.
