= Pizzo Alzasca =

Mountain in Switzerland

- Location within Switzerland

Highest point
- Elevation: 2,262 m (7,421 ft)
- Prominence: 226 m (741 ft)
- Parent peak: Rosso di Ribia
- Coordinates: 46°16′38.8″N 8°34′34″E

Geography
- Location: Ticino, Switzerland
- Parent range: Lepontine Alps

Pizzo Alzasca is a mountain of the Swiss Lepontine Alps, overlooking Cevio in the canton of Ticino.

On the south side lies the lake of Alzasca.
