= Cavergno =

- Former municipality
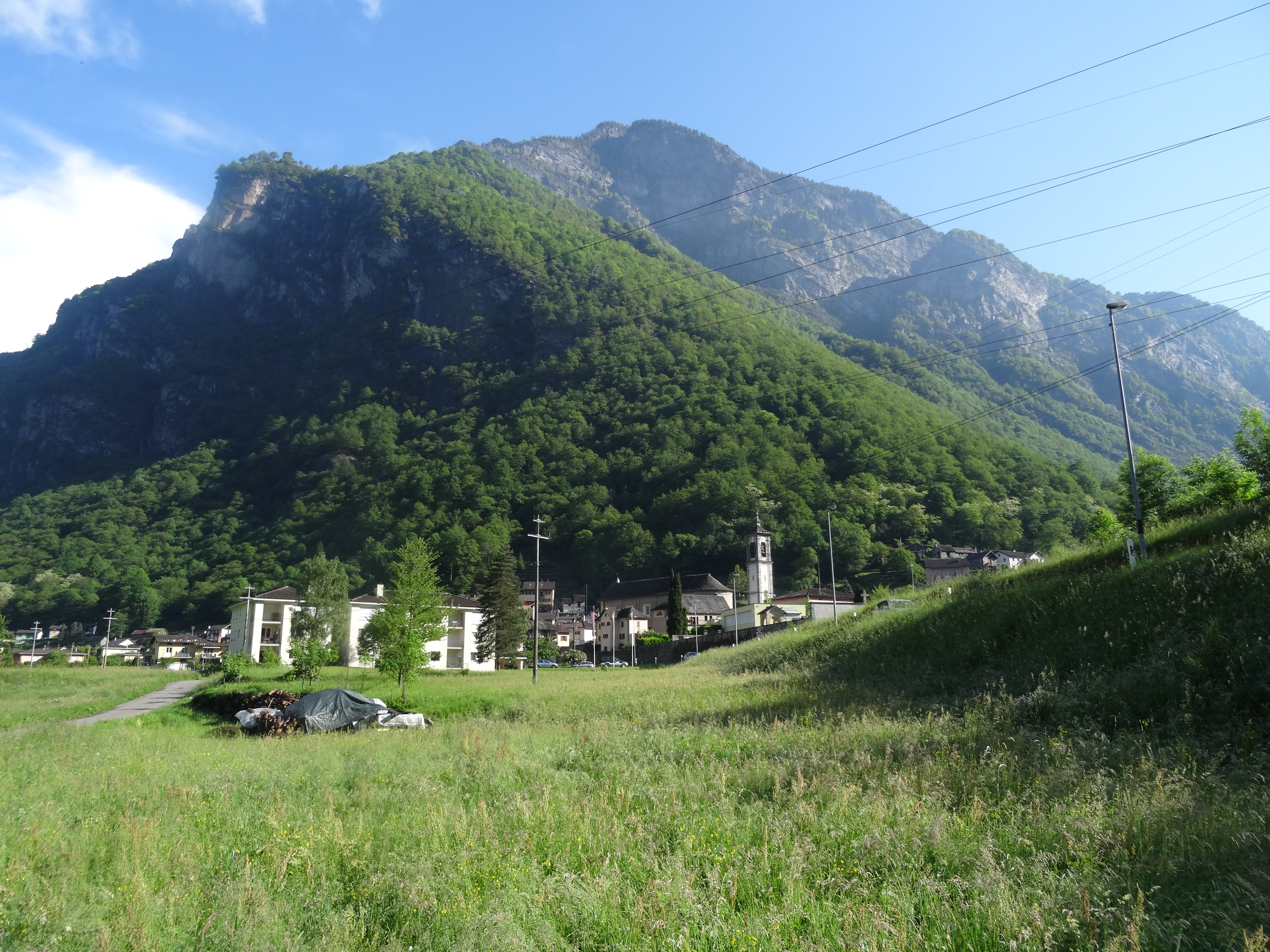

- Flag Coat of arms
- Location of Cavergno
- Location within Switzerland Location within Canton of Ticino
- Coordinates: 46°20′N 8°36′E
- Country: Switzerland
- Canton: Ticino
- District: Vallemaggia

Area
  - Total: 54.79 km^{2} (21.15 sq mi)
- Elevation: 459 m (1,506 ft)

Population (December 2004)
  - Total: 486
  - Density: 8.87/km^{2} (23.0/sq mi)
- Time zone: UTC+01:00 (CET)
  - Summer (DST): UTC+02:00 (CEST)
- Postal code: 6690
- SFOS number: 5308
- ISO 3166 code: CH-TI
- Surrounded by: Bignasco, Bosco/Gurin, Cerentino, Formazza (IT-VB), Lavizzara
- Website: SFSO statistics

Cavergno is a village in the district of Vallemaggia, in the canton of Ticino, Switzerland. On 22 October 2006 Cavergno lost its status as an independent municipality when together with the village of Bignasco it was incorporated into the municipality of Cevio.
