= Cevio =

- Municipality
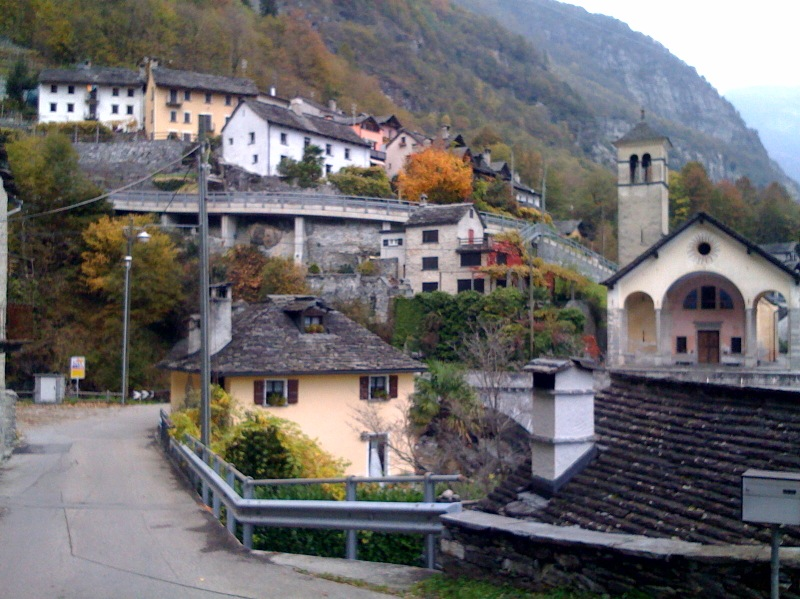
- Cevio village

- Flag Coat of arms
- Location of Cevio
- Location within Switzerland Location within Canton of Ticino
- Coordinates: 46°19′N 8°39′E
- Country: Switzerland
- Canton: Ticino
- District: Vallemaggia

Government
  - Mayor: Sindaco; Pierluigi Martini

Area
  - Total: 151.42 km^{2} (58.46 sq mi)
- Elevation: 421 m (1,381 ft)

Population (December 2004)
  - Total: 476
  - Density: 3.14/km^{2} (8.14/sq mi)
- Time zone: UTC+01:00 (CET)
  - Summer (DST): UTC+02:00 (CEST)
- Postal code: 6675
- SFOS number: 5310
- ISO 3166 code: CH-TI
- Localities: Bignasco, Cavergno
- Surrounded by: Bedretto, Bosco/Gurin, Brione (Verzasca), Campo (Vallemaggia), Cerentino, Formazza (IT-VB), Lavizzara, Linescio, Maggia
- Website: www.cevio.ch

Cevio is the capital of the district of Vallemaggia in the canton of Ticino in Switzerland. In 2006 Cevio grew by incorporating the villages of Bignasco and Cavergno, previously municipalities in their own right.

== History ==
Cevio was first mentioned in 1335 as Zevio.

The municipality has long been the principal town of the district. In 1858, the municipality of Linescio was separated from it. Chancellor Giovan Angelo Franzoni, who was in power for 36 years, built himself a Patrician palazzo outside the center of Cevio.

After the Second World War a rapid diversification of the historical heritage began. In 1962, the Museo di Valmaggia was founded to preserve and show the material heritage of the valley. After acquisition and restoration of the Palazzo Franzoni, the first regional ethnographic museum of the canton of Ticino was opened in 1963 there.

In the fall of 2006, Cavergno and Bignasco were incorporated into the municipality; Bignasco failed to resist the incorporation in court.

== Geography ==
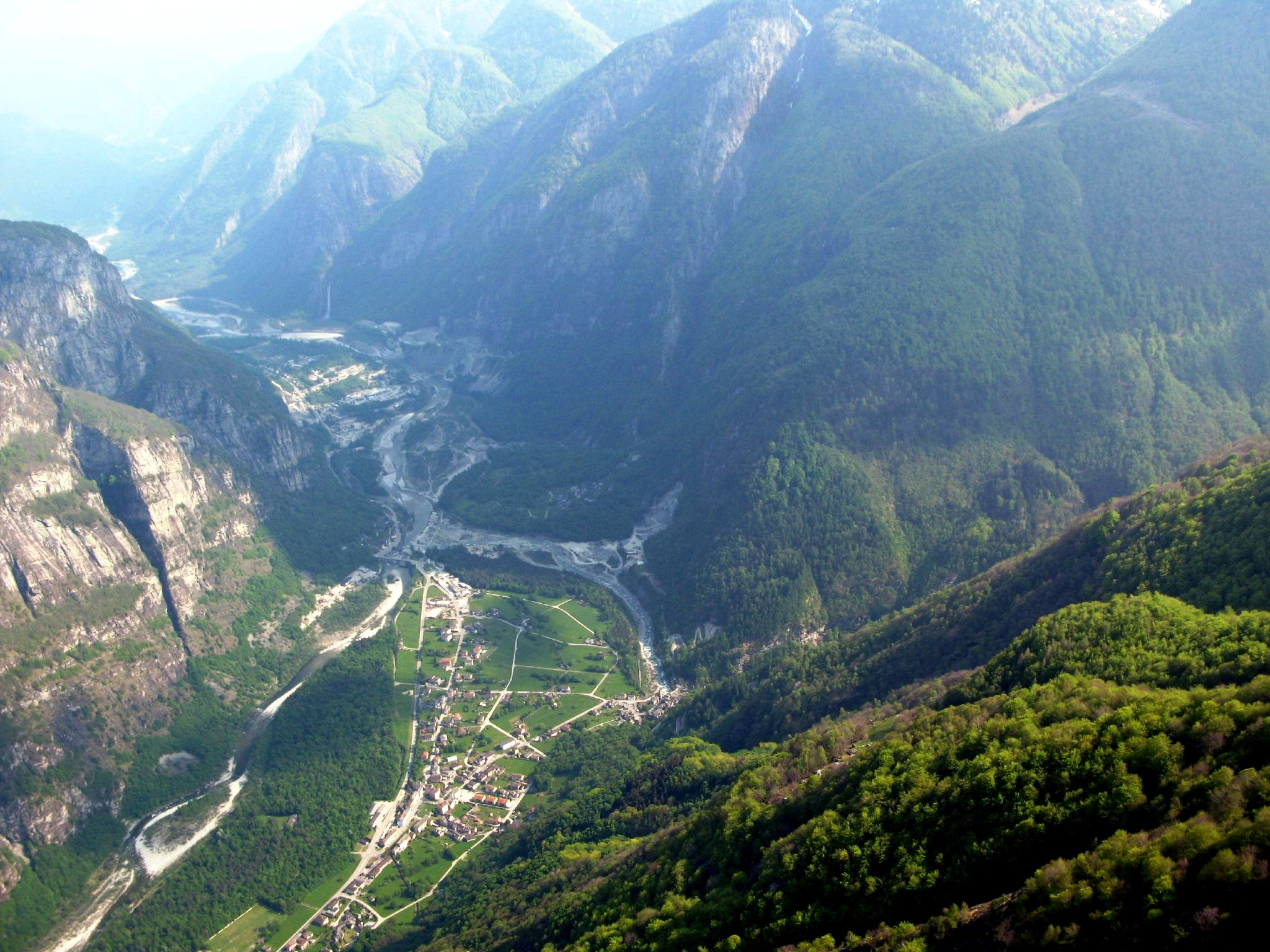
Cevio from the air

Aerial view (1954)

Cevio has an area, as of 1997, of 151.42 square kilometers (58.46 sq mi). Of this area, 0.59 km^{2} (0.23 sq mi) or 0.4% is used for agricultural purposes, while 9.56 km^{2} (3.69 sq mi) or 6.3% is forested. Of the rest of the land, 0.76 km^{2} (0.29 sq mi) or 0.5% is settled (buildings or roads), 0.89 km^{2} (0.34 sq mi) or 0.6% is either rivers or lakes and 2.83 km^{2} (1.09 sq mi) or 1.9% is unproductive land.

Of the built up area, housing and buildings made up 0.1% and transportation infrastructure made up 0.1%. Out of the forested land, all of the forested land area is covered with heavy forests. Of the agricultural land, 0.2% is used for growing crops. All the water in the municipality is flowing water. Of the unproductive areas, 1.2% is unproductive vegetation.

The municipality is located in the Vallemaggia district. It is the center of the Rovana sub-district and is located at the confluence of the Maggia and Rovana rivers. Cevio consists of a number of scattered settlements. Particularly interesting is the hamlet Boschetto (almost abandoned), which has preserved the structure of the rural seventeenth-century village intact. There are an unusual number of rocks with cup markings.

Until 1858, the village of Linescio was part of Cevio, and in 2006, the former municipality of Cavergno joined Cevio.

Cevio lies 23 km (14 mi) northwest of Locarno in the upper Vallemaggia. The mountain Pizzo Alzasca overlooks the town.

== Coat of arms ==
The blazon of the municipal coat of arms is Aure St. maurice riding a horse argent holding a flag gules a cross argent and in base three fleurs de li or.

== Demographics ==
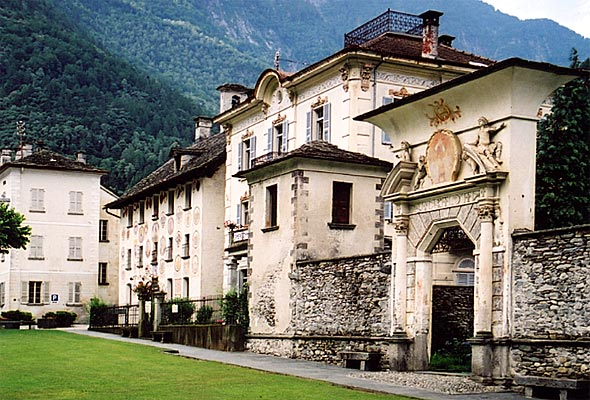

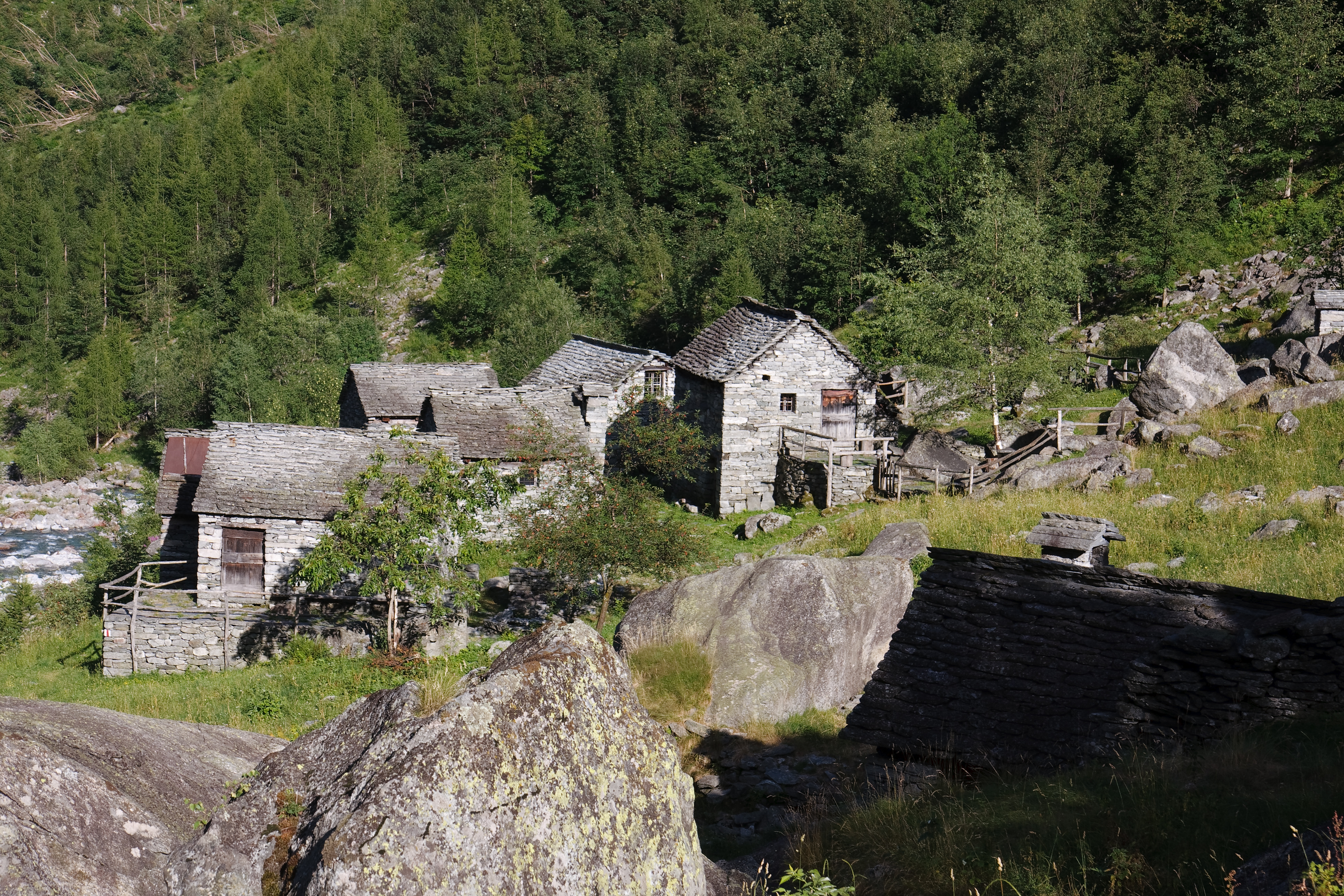
Calnegia village

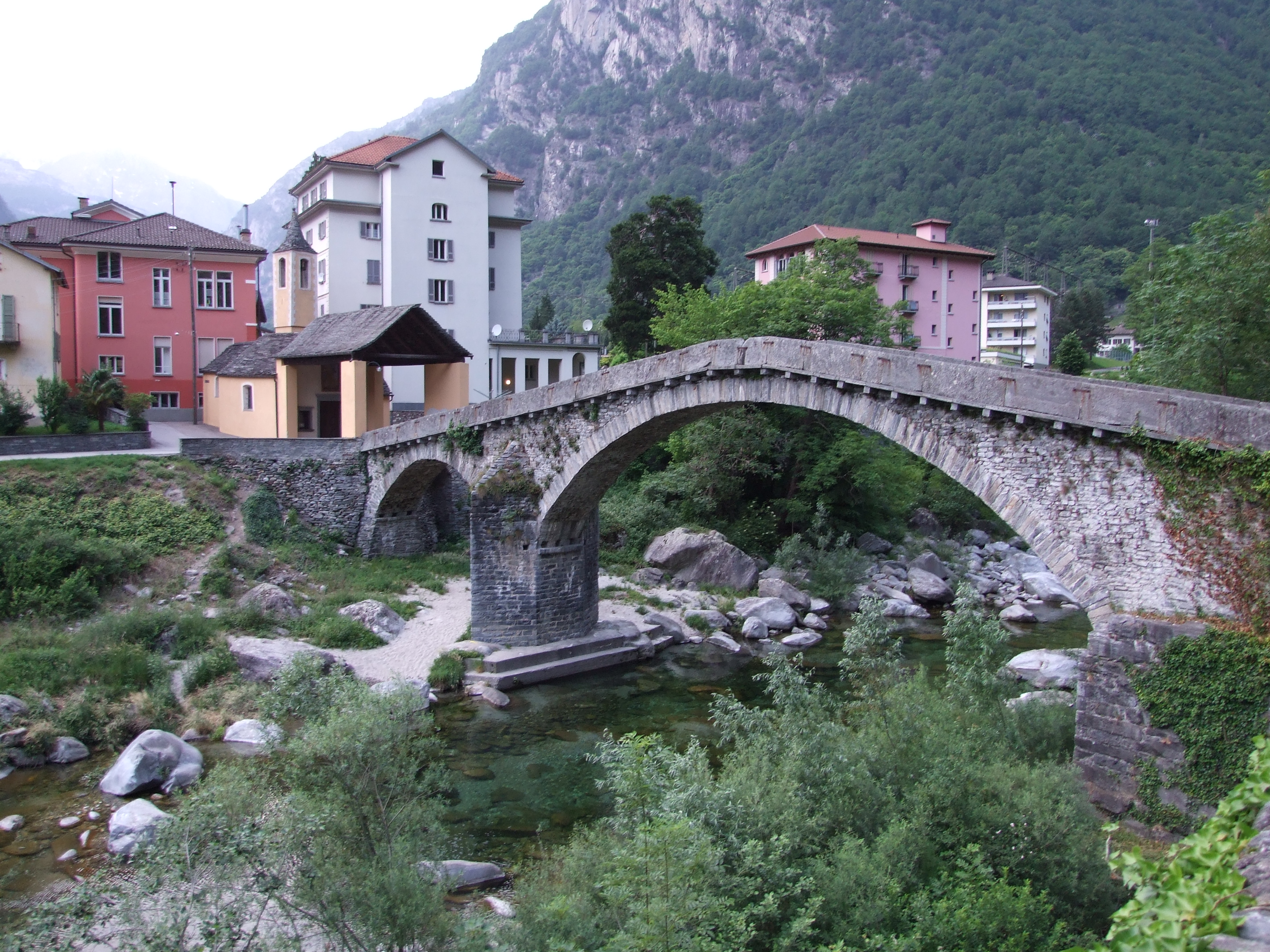
Old stone bridge and new buildings in Bignasco

Cevio has a population (as of December 2020) of 1,142. As of 2008, 14.7% of the population are resident foreign nationals. Over the last 10 years (1997–2007) the population has changed at a rate of -4.6%.

Most of the population (as of 2000) speaks Italian language (387 or 77.9%), with German being second most common (54 or 10.9%) and Spanish being third (21 or 4.2%). There are 12 people who speak French and 1 person who speaks Romansh. The inhabitants of Cevio speak the Alpine dialect of the Lombard language, one of the four existing dialects, still maintaining standard Italian as an official language.

Of the 476 residents, 364 (76.47 percent) are Swiss citizens. The largest non-Swiss groups are from Italy, Spain, Portugal, Bosnia and Herzegovina and Sri Lanka. The unusually high number of non-Swiss in the municipality is due to the abundance of jobs in the quarries and hospital.

As of 2008, the gender distribution of the population was 50.7% male and 49.3% female. The population was made up of 512 Swiss men (41.9% of the population), and 107 (8.8%) non-Swiss men. There were 540 Swiss women (44.2%), and 63 (5.2%) non-Swiss women. Of the population in the municipality 137 or about 27.6% were born in Cevio and lived there in 2000. There were 140 or 28.2% who were born in the same canton, while 60 or 12.1% were born somewhere else in Switzerland, and 131 or 26.4% were born outside of Switzerland.

In 2008 there were 7 live births to Swiss citizens and were 15 deaths of Swiss citizens and 1 non-Swiss citizen death. Ignoring immigration and emigration, the population of Swiss citizens decreased by 8 while the foreign population decreased by 1. There were 2 Swiss men and 3 Swiss women who immigrated back to Switzerland. At the same time, there were 8 non-Swiss men who immigrated from another country to Switzerland. The total Swiss population change in 2008 (from all sources, including moves across municipal borders) was a decrease of 4 and the non-Swiss population change was a decrease of 8 people. This represents a population growth rate of -1.0%.

The age distribution, as of 2009, in Cevio is; 94 children or 7.7% of the population are between 0 and 9 years old and 127 teenagers or 10.4% are between 10 and 19. Of the adult population, 126 people or 10.3% of the population are between 20 and 29 years old. 112 people or 9.2% are between 30 and 39, 204 people or 16.7% are between 40 and 49, and 187 people or 15.3% are between 50 and 59. The senior population distribution is 140 people or 11.5% of the population are between 60 and 69 years old, 133 people or 10.9% are between 70 and 79, there are 99 people or 8.1% who are over 80.

As of 2000, there were 186 people who were single and never married in the municipality. There were 235 married individuals, 52 widows or widowers and 24 individuals who are divorced.

As of 2000, there were 518 private households in the municipality, and an average of 2.3 persons per household. There were 68 households that consist of only one person and 8 households with five or more people. Out of a total of 205 households that answered this question, 33.2% were households made up of just one person and 4 were adults who lived with their parents. Of the rest of the households, there are 59 married couples without children, 56 married couples with children There were 10 single parents with a child or children. There were 4 households that were made up unrelated people and 4 households that were made some sort of institution or another collective housing.

In 2000 there were 233 single family homes (or 79.0% of the total) out of a total of 295 inhabited buildings. There were 44 multi-family buildings (14.9%), along with 5 multi-purpose buildings that were mostly used for housing (1.7%) and 13 other use buildings (commercial or industrial) that also had some housing (4.4%). Of the single family homes 11 were built before 1919, while 10 were built between 1990 and 2000. The greatest number of single family homes (134) were built between 1919 and 1945.

In 2000 there were 378 apartments in the municipality. The most common apartment size was 3 rooms of which there were 114. There were 25 single room apartments and 78 apartments with five or more rooms. Of these apartments, a total of 197 apartments (52.1% of the total) were permanently occupied, while 177 apartments (46.8%) were seasonally occupied and 4 apartments (1.1%) were empty. As of 2007, the construction rate of new housing units was 1.6 new units per 1000 residents. The vacancy rate for the municipality, in 2008, was 0.34%.

The historical population is given in the following chart:

== Heritage sites of national significance ==
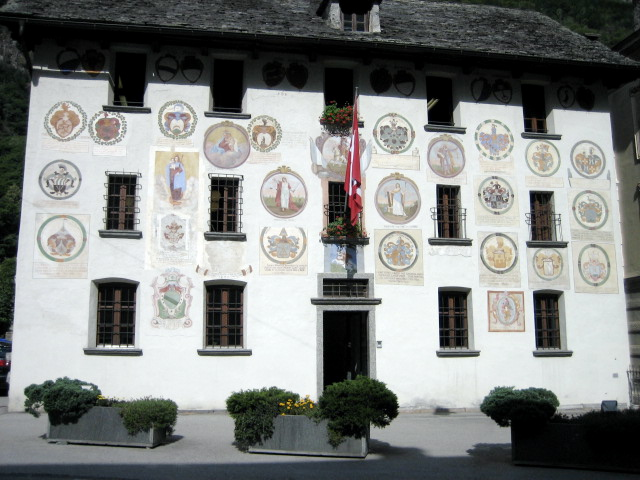
Pretorio

The Respini-Moretti House, the Case Franzoni and the Museo di Valmaggia, the Church of S. Maria del Ponte alla Rovana, the Parish Church of S. Maria Assunta e S. Giovanni with Ossuary and Portico, and the Pretorio are all listed as Swiss heritage site of national significance. The villages of Bignasco, Boschetto, Cevio/Rovana and the Val Bavona are all part of the Inventory of Swiss Heritage Sites.

== Politics ==
In the 2007 federal election the most popular party was the CVP which received 32.93% of the vote. The next three most popular parties were the FDP (26.74%), the SP (15.29%) and the Ticino League (14.43%). In the federal election, a total of 386 votes were cast, and the voter turnout was 45.7%.

In the 2007 Gran Consiglio election, there were a total of 847 registered voters in Cevio, of which 575 or 67.9% voted. 3 blank ballots were cast, leaving 572 valid ballots in the election. The most popular party was the PPD+GenGiova which received 167 or 29.2% of the vote. The next three most popular parties were; the SSI (with 123 or 21.5%), the PLRT (with 103 or 18.0%) and the PS (with 69 or 12.1%).

In the 2007 Consiglio di Stato election, 2 blank ballots and 2 null ballots were cast, leaving 571 valid ballots in the election. The most popular party was the PPD which received 171 or 29.9% of the vote. The next three most popular parties were; the LEGA (with 116 or 20.3%), the SSI (with 97 or 17.0%) and the PLRT (with 90 or 15.8%).

== Economy ==
As of 2007, Cevio had an unemployment rate of 1.51%. As of 2005, there were 32 people employed in the primary economic sector and about 14 businesses involved in this sector. 148 people were employed in the secondary sector and there were 19 businesses in this sector. 372 people were employed in the tertiary sector, with 66 businesses in this sector. There were 209 residents of the municipality who were employed in some capacity, of which females made up 43.1% of the workforce.

In 2008 the total number of full-time equivalent jobs was 461. The number of jobs in the primary sector was 14, all of which were in agriculture. The number of jobs in the secondary sector was 161, of which 15 or (9.3%) were in manufacturing, 21 or (13.0%) were in mining and 86 (53.4%) were in construction. The number of jobs in the tertiary sector was 286. In the tertiary sector; 28 or 9.8% were in wholesale or retail sales or the repair of motor vehicles, 15 or 5.2% were in the movement and storage of goods, 59 or 20.6% were in a hotel or restaurant, 9 or 3.1% were the insurance or financial industry, 10 or 3.5% were technical professionals or scientists, 41 or 14.3% were in education and 96 or 33.6% were in health care.

In 2000, there were 252 workers who commuted into the municipality and 89 workers who commuted away. The municipality is a net importer of workers, with about 2.8 workers entering the municipality for every one leaving. About 6.7% of the workforce coming into Cevio are coming from outside Switzerland. Of the working population, 7.4% used public transportation to get to work, and 57.8% used a private car.

As of 2009, there were 7 hotels in Cevio with a total of 71 rooms and 141 beds.

== Religion ==
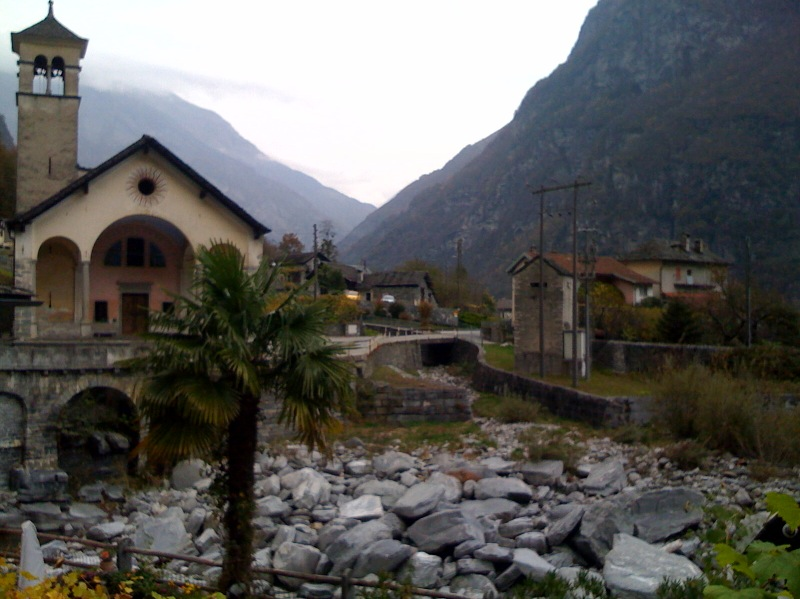
Church in Cevio

From the 2000 census, 389 or 78.3% were Roman Catholic, while 36 or 7.2% belonged to the Swiss Reformed Church. Of the rest of the population, there were 8 members of an Orthodox church (or about 1.61% of the population), and there were 2 individuals (or about 0.40% of the population) who belonged to another Christian church. There were 9 (or about 1.81% of the population) who were Islamic. There were 2 individuals who were Buddhist. 28 (or about 5.63% of the population) belonged to no church, are agnostic or atheist, and 23 individuals (or about 4.63% of the population) did not answer the question.

== Climate ==
Between 1981 and 2010 Cevio had an average of 106.1 days of rain or snow per year and on average received 1,713 mm (67.4 in) of precipitation. The wettest month was September during which time Cevio received an average of 215 mm (8.5 in) of rain or snow. During this month there was precipitation for an average of 8.3 days. The month with the most days of precipitation was May, with an average of 13, but with only 207 mm (8.1 in) of rain or snow. The driest month of the year was February with an average of 65 mm (2.6 in) of precipitation over 5.8 days.

Cevio village has a Maritime Temperate climate (CfB) under the Köppen climate classification. The average annual temperature is 10 °C (50 °F). The average coldest month was January with an average temperature of 1 °C (34 °F), while the warmest month was July with an average temperature of 19.5 °C (67.1 °F).

Climate data for Cevio weather station elev. 417 meters (1,368 ft)
Month	Jan	Feb	Mar	Apr	May	Jun	Jul	Aug	Sep	Oct	Nov	Dec	Year
Mean daily maximum °C (°F)	4.3 (39.7)	5.9 (42.6)	10.2 (50.4)	14.1 (57.4)	18.1 (64.6)	21.9 (71.4)	24.5 (76.1)	23.4 (74.1)	20 (68)	14.9 (58.8)	9.1 (48.4)	5.6 (42.1)	14.3 (57.8)
Daily mean °C (°F)	1 (34)	2.5 (36.5)	5.9 (42.6)	9.5 (49.1)	13.5 (56.3)	17.0 (62.6)	19.5 (67.1)	18.7 (65.7)	15.6 (60.1)	10.9 (51.6)	5.6 (42.1)	2.3 (36.1)	10.2 (50.4)
Mean daily minimum °C (°F)	−2.1 (28.2)	−0.9 (30.4)	1.6 (34.9)	5 (41)	9.0 (48.2)	12 (54)	14.5 (58.1)	14.0 (57.2)	11.3 (52.3)	6.9 (44.4)	2.1 (35.8)	−0.9 (30.4)	6.0 (42.9)
Average precipitation mm (inches)	69 (2.7)	64 (2.5)	110 (4.4)	150 (6)	190 (7.6)	190 (7.3)	160 (6.3)	180 (7.1)	180 (7)	180 (7.1)	140 (5.5)	79 (3.1)	1,690 (66.4)

== Education ==
In Cevio about 146 or (29.4%) of the population have completed non-mandatory upper secondary education, and 40 or (8.0%) have completed additional higher education (either university or a Fachhochschule). Of the 40 who completed tertiary schooling, 50.0% were Swiss men, 35.0% were Swiss women.

In Cevio there were a total of 197 students (as of 2009). The Ticino education system provides up to three years of non-mandatory kindergarten and in Cevio there were 23 children in kindergarten. The primary school program lasts for five years and includes both a standard school and a special school. In the municipality, 62 students attended the standard primary schools and 2 students attended the special school. In the lower secondary school system, students either attend a two-year middle school followed by a two-year pre-apprenticeship or they attend a four-year program to prepare for higher education. There were 49 students in the two-year middle school, while 17 students were in the four-year advanced program.

The upper secondary school includes several options, but at the end of the upper secondary program, a student will be prepared to enter a trade or to continue on to a university or college. In Ticino, vocational students may either attend school while working on their internship or apprenticeship (which takes three or four years) or may attend school followed by an internship or apprenticeship (which takes one year as a full-time student or one and a half to two years as a part-time student). There were 7 vocational students who were attending school full-time and 33 who attend part-time.

The professional program lasts three years and prepares a student for a job in engineering, nursing, computer science, business, tourism and similar fields. There were 4 students in the professional program.

As of 2000, there were 236 students in Cevio who came from another municipality, while 16 residents attended schools outside the municipality.
