= Valle di Campo =

Coordinates: 46.28536°N 8.50888°E

- valley
- Interactive map of Valle di Campo
- Location: canton of Ticino, Switzerland
- Part of: Valle Maggia

Valle di Campo is a side-valley of the Valle Maggia, canton of Ticino, Switzerland. The valley has few small villages/hamlets.
