= Formazza =

Formazza Pomatt (Walser)
- Comune
- Comune di Formazza
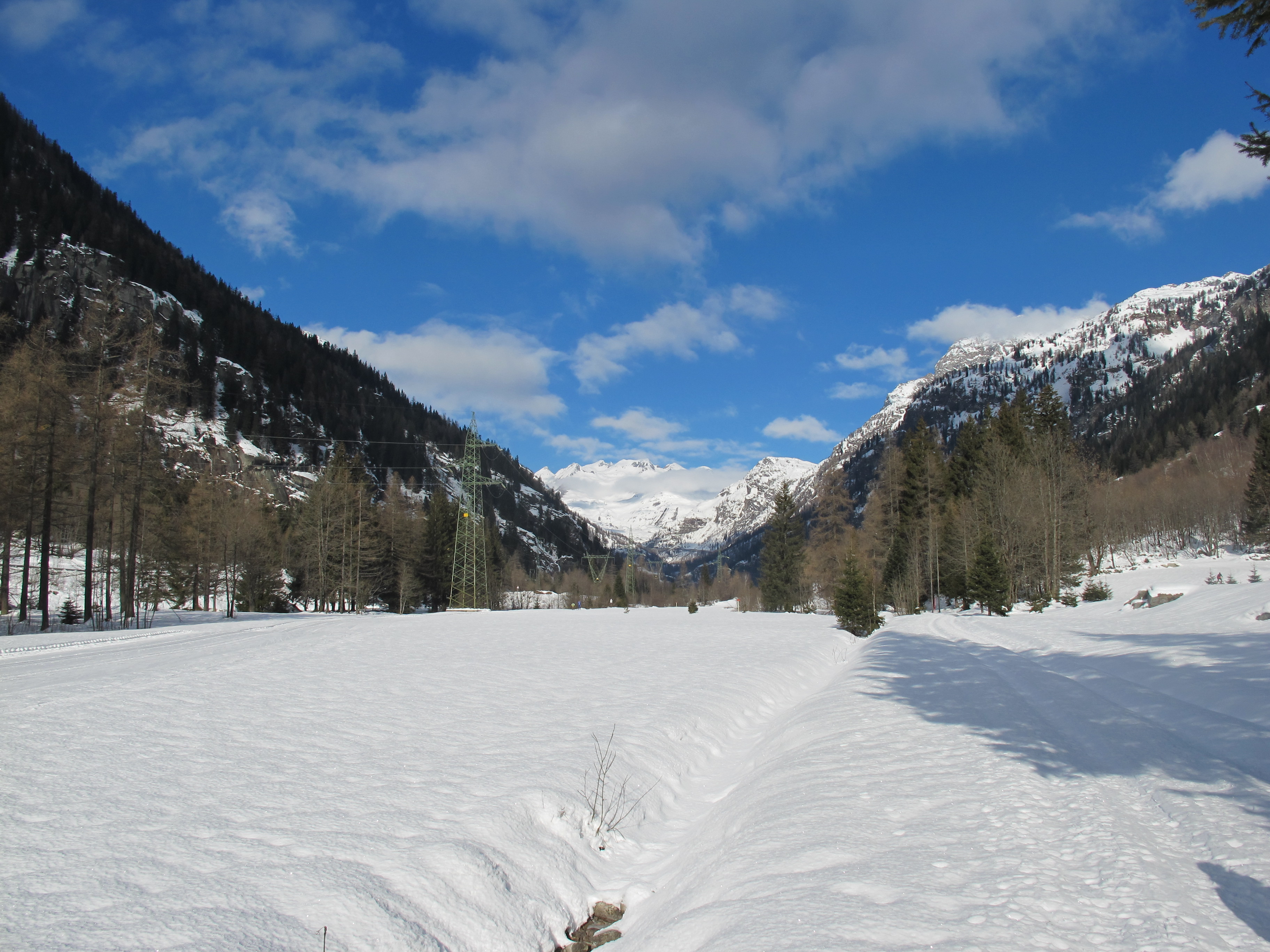
- Mountains in Formazza

- Coat of arms

- Location within Italy Location within Piedmont
- Coordinates: 46°23′N 8°26′E
- Country: Italy
- Region: Piedmont
- Province: Province of Verbano-Cusio-Ossola (VB)
- Frazioni: Foppiano, Antillone, Fondovalle, Chiesa, Valdo, San Michele, Ponte (communal seat), Brendo, Grovella, Canza, Sotto Frua, La Frua, Riale

Government
  - Mayor: Bruna Piera Papa

Area
  - Total: 130.65 km^{2} (50.44 sq mi)
- Elevation: 1,280 m (4,200 ft)

Population (30 June 2017)
  - Total: 438
  - Density: 3.35/km^{2} (8.68/sq mi)
- Demonym: Formazzini
- Time zone: UTC+1 (CET)
  - Summer (DST): UTC+2 (CEST)
- Postal code: 28030
- Dialing code: 0324
- Website: Official website

Formazza (German and Walser: Pomatt; Ossolano: Formassa) is a comune (municipality) in the Province of Verbano-Cusio-Ossola in the Italian region Piedmont, located about 160 kilometres (99 mi) northeast of Turin and about 50 kilometres (31 mi) north of Verbania, on the border with Switzerland.

Formazza borders the following municipalities: Baceno, Bedretto (Switzerland), Bignasco (Switzerland), Binn (Switzerland), Bosco/Gurin (Switzerland), Cavergno (Switzerland), Premia, Reckingen-Gluringen (Switzerland), Ulrichen (Switzerland).

The village was founded by Walser and Walser German is still spoken.

== Geography and climate ==
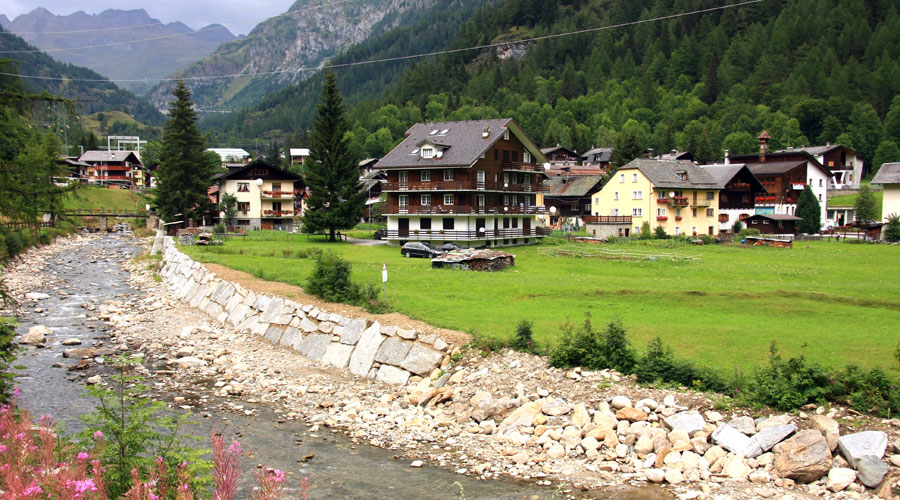
View of Ponte in Formazza

The village is situated about an elevation of 1,200 metres (3,900 ft) above sea level on the Formazza plateau in Formazza valley. Its altitude and location directly under the high mountains of the western Alps influences the climate. In fact, there is an average of more than one meter and thirty centimeters of precipitation per year (especially snow). The climate is the type Dfb/Dfc (Köppen climate classification), which means it is a humid continental climate with fresh and short summers (but usually there is no dry season). The annual average temperature at one local weather station is about 4 °C (39 °F) and usually the coldest month (January) has a daily mean temperature of about −4 °C (25 °F). The lowest values can reach about −20 °C (−4 °F). The hottest month (July) has an average temperature of about 13 °C (55 °F) and the summer lasts less than three months.

=== Frazioni ===
Frazioni, or subdivisions of Formazza (first name in Italian, second name in Walser):

- Antillone / Puneigä
- Brendo / In dä Brendu
- Canza / Früttwald - Früduwald
- Chiesa - Alla Chiesa / Zer Chilchu - Andermatten - An där Mattu - In där Mattu
- Fondovalle / Stafelwald - Schtaafuwaald
- Foppiano / Untermstalden - Unnerum Schtaldä
- Frua / Uf der Frütt
- Sotto Frua / Unter der Frütt
- Grovella / Gurfelen - Gurfelä
- Morasco / Moraschg
- Ponte - Al Ponte / Zum Steg - Zumstäg - Zumschtäg - Zer Briggu
- Riale / Kehrbäch(i) - Cherbäch
- Valdo / Wald - Waald
- San Michele / Tuffwaald - Tuffalt

== Demographics ==
Historical population

Year	Pop.	±%
1861	656	—
1871	683	+4.1%
1881	654	−4.2%
1901	515	−21.3%
1911	499	−3.1%

Year	Pop.	±%
1921	517	+3.6%
1931	659	+27.5%
1936	748	+13.5%
1951	732	−2.1%
1961	648	−11.5%

Year	Pop.	±%
1971	577	−11.0%
1981	547	−5.2%
1991	461	−15.7%
2001	448	−2.8%
2011	442	−1.3%

Source: ISTAT 2012

== People ==
- Mario Bacher (b. 1941), ski mountaineer and cross-country skier

== See also ==
- Lake Castel
