= Vallemaggia District =

District in Ticino, Switzerland

Coordinates: 46°21′N 8°35′E

Vallemaggia District Distretto di Vallemaggia
- District
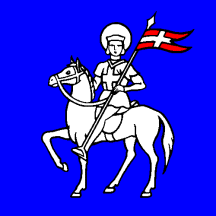
- Flag Coat of arms
- Country: Switzerland
- Canton: Ticino
- Capital: Cevio

Area
  - Total: 569.42 km^{2} (219.85 sq mi)

Population (2020)
  - Total: 5,952
  - Density: 10.45/km^{2} (27.07/sq mi)
- Time zone: UTC+1 (CET)
  - Summer (DST): UTC+2 (CEST)
- Municipalities: 8

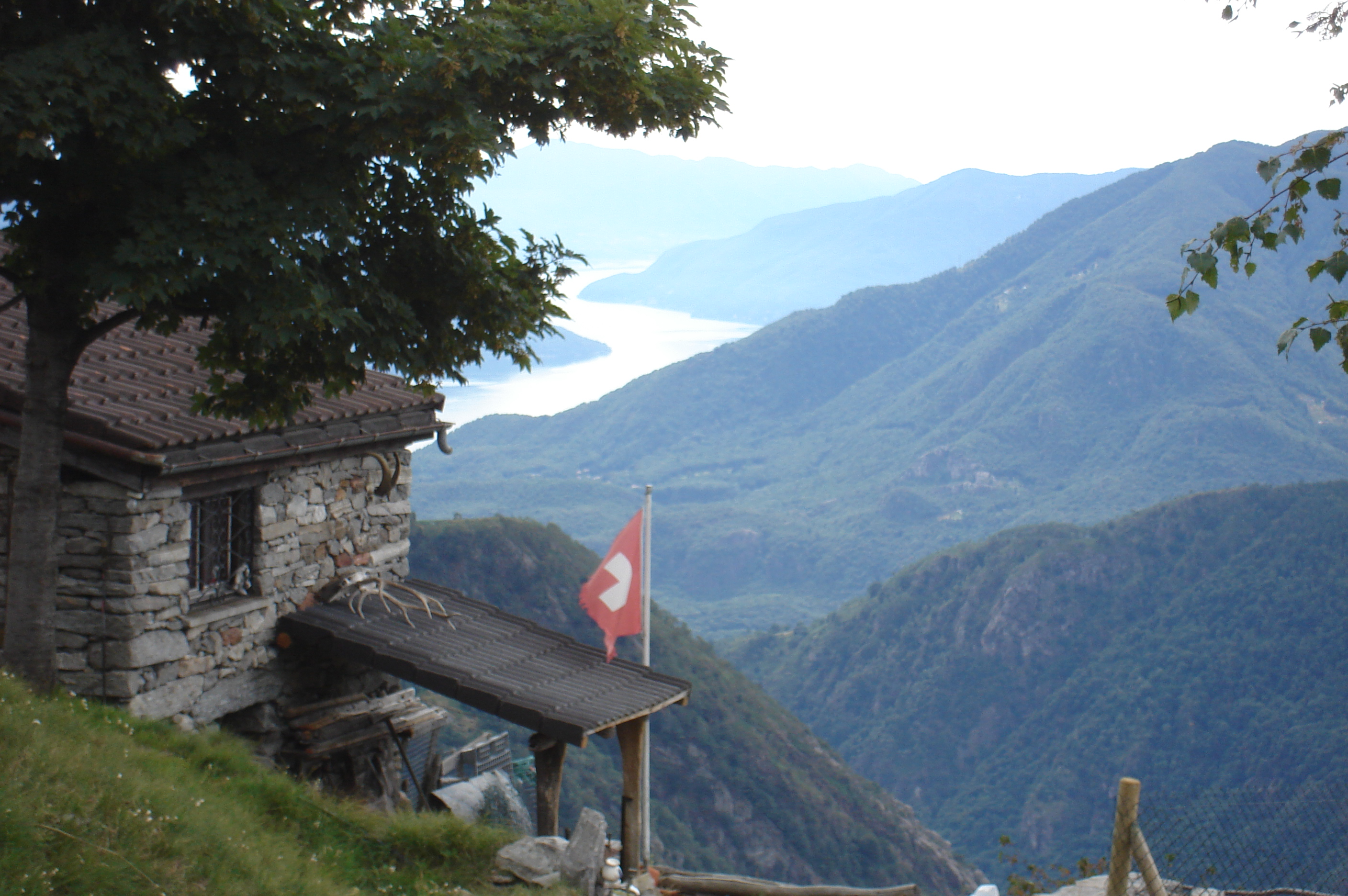
Hamlet of Brunescio on the left flank of Vallemaggia

The Vallemaggia District is a district of the canton of Ticino in Switzerland, bordering the Leventina district to the northwest, the Locarno district to the southeast, and Italy to the west. It encompasses eight municipalities and has a population of 5,952 (as of 31 December 2020). The capital of the district is Cevio. Although it extends over approximately one-fifth of the cantonal territory, only about 2% of the Ticino population lived there in 2000.

The district is traversed by the Maggia and its tributaries Bavona and Rovana, and is characterized by two distinct regions. The Valle Maggia comprises the lower valley and the upper valleys (Rovana Valley, Bavona Valley, and Lavizzara Valley). The lower valley, relatively wide, extends from Avegno to Cavergno with minimal elevation changes. The upper valleys are narrow gorges that open into the main valley at Cevio and Bignasco and are surrounded by imposing mountains.

== Geography ==
The Vallemaggia District has an area, as of 1997, of 569.42 square kilometers (219.85 sq mi). Of this area, 9.61 km^{2} (3.71 sq mi) or 1.7% is used for agricultural purposes, while 240.5 km^{2} (92.9 sq mi) or 42.2% is forested. Of the rest of the land, 6.57 km^{2} (2.54 sq mi) or 1.2% is settled (buildings or roads), 15.46 km^{2} (5.97 sq mi) or 2.7% is either rivers or lakes and 244.24 km^{2} (94.30 sq mi) or 42.9% is unproductive land.

Of the built up area, housing and buildings made up 0.4% and transportation infrastructure made up 0.4%. Out of the forested land, 31.4% of the total land area is heavily forested and 4.8% is covered with orchards or small clusters of trees. Of the agricultural land, 1.1% is used for growing crops. Of the water in the district, 0.7% is in lakes and 2.0% is in rivers and streams. Of the unproductive areas, 18.9% is unproductive vegetation and 24.0% is too rocky for vegetation.

== History ==
=== Prehistoric and Roman periods ===
Isolated findings from the Copper Age attest to prehistoric occupation of the valley. During Romanization, from the final La Tène period to the Augustan era, the population was distributed throughout Val Maggia. Despite its geographical isolation, the valley was connected to the vicus of Muralto. Humans began transforming the landscape through terracing, and the introduction of chestnut and walnut trees during the Roman period.

=== Middle Ages ===
During the Middle Ages, Val Maggia shared the history of the pieve of Locarno and depended on the church of Saint Victor of Locarno until around the year 1000, when Maggia, Sornico, and Cevio became parishes. Gradually, isolated neighborhood communities (vicinanze) were incorporated into larger units. In the 14th century, Bignasco, Cavergno, Brontallo, and Menzonio formed an administrative entity, as did the villages of Lavizzara and Rovana. Cevio, Cavergno, Campo, Cerentino, and Bosco constituted the Roana Superior.

In 1398, the valleys of Maggia and Verzasca, along with Mergoscia, rebelled against the taxes that the nobles of Locarno, who held fiefs in the region, continuously demanded. They formally separated from the community of Locarno in 1403 and created an independent jurisdiction centered in Cevio, with a General Council of forty-two members and statutes. Several conflicts marked the coexistence of local communities. The dispute that opposed the lower valley communes to Cevio and Val Rovana at the beginning of the 15th century ended with the signing of a treaty in 1403/1404.

Val Maggia attempted to escape the authority of the Duchy of Milan by allying with the House of Savoy (1411-1412), but was occupied by the Confederates (1416), before returning to Milan (1422) and passing to the Rusca family (1439). Around 1430, Val Lavizzara obtained from the Duchy of Milan an independent jurisdiction from Val Maggia.

=== Swiss Confederation period ===
From 1513 to 1798, Val Maggia constituted a bailiwick of the twelve cantons (the thirteen except Appenzell) and bore the German name of Meiental or Mainthal (other variants are also attested). The bailiwick was divided into two communities (valleys Maggia and Lavizzara), each possessing its own statutes, assemblies, and officers. It was subject to the authority of a bailiff and a fiscal; the former chose his place of residence (Cevio or Sornico), but had to travel regularly to the other administrative center to administer justice with the help, in the most serious cases, of local assistant judges.

The community of Val Lavizzara defended its autonomy from that of Val Maggia and sabotaged the attempts of some bailiffs to establish the tribunal solely in Cevio and the project of the sindacato (composed of delegates from the twelve cantons) to suppress the assistant judges. Integrated into the Canton of Lugano under the Helvetic Republic, Vallemaggia became one of the districts of the Canton of Ticino in 1803, with Cevio as its administrative center.

=== Economic development and emigration ===
During the Middle Ages and the modern era, the economy was primarily based on agriculture (cultivation of cereals, potatoes, and flax), viticulture, and livestock farming of small animals. For centuries, Val Maggia exported significant quantities of cheese. Forests constituted an important resource and were often overexploited, which had disastrous environmental consequences. Handicrafts (wool spinning, weaving, woodworking), the soapstone industry, and in the second half of the 19th century, the marble and gneiss industries were among the complementary activities.

Strong emigration, already attested in the Middle Ages (toward the Locarno region and Sottoceneri), also helped improve the standard of living. Population growth, which probably reached its maximum around the mid-18th century, gave rise to a first wave of emigration, often periodic or seasonal (masons, stonemasons, grooms, merchants, and artists, active in various European cities). This relieved demographic pressure and allowed relative well-being.

Around 1850, inhabitants left to settle overseas, often permanently, particularly in California and Australia, due to difficult economic conditions (customs union following the creation of the federal state, retaliation from the Kingdom of Lombardy–Venetia attached to Austria, and worsening weather conditions). This exodus caused significant depopulation of the region and demographic imbalances (gender ratio, population aging, low birth rate, high celibacy rate). The phenomenon had lasting effects and caused a decline in agricultural productivity, leading to new departures, particularly affecting the most isolated communes.

=== Modern developments ===
After World War II, the trend reversed slightly. However, the demographic evolution of the lower valley, which benefited from the relative proximity of the economic center of Locarno and experienced suburban development in the last decades of the 20th century, must be clearly distinguished from that of the upper valleys, which was much more problematic. At the beginning of the 21st century, Val Rovana, which lost three-quarters of its population between 1860 and 1980, and Val Bavona seemed destined to become primarily vacation regions. In Val Lavizzara, the demographic decline was less pronounced.

A carriageable road to Bignasco was only built between 1814 and 1824, which reduced the isolation of Val Maggia, especially in winter. The Locarno–Ponte Brolla–Bignasco railway line, opened in 1907, played an important role in the development of quarries (dismantled in 1965). The exploitation of waters from the Maggia basin, begun around 1950, caused several environmental problems; it became very important and helped slow rural exodus through the creation of some jobs (nine power plants produced a total of approximately 611 megawatts in 2010). Since the 1970s, tourism has taken an increasingly important place in the economy of Val Maggia, as evidenced by the sharp increase in secondary residences.

== Demographics ==
Of the Swiss national languages (as of 2000), 477 speak German, 88 people speak French, 4,814 people speak Italian, and 12 people speak Romansh. The remainder (202 people) speak another language.

As of 2008, the gender distribution of the population was 49.2% male and 50.8% female. The population was made up of 2,532 Swiss men (43.1% of the population), and 356 (6.1%) non-Swiss men. There were 2,731 Swiss women (46.5%), and 252 (4.3%) non-Swiss women.

In 2008 there were 38 live births to Swiss citizens and 2 births to non-Swiss citizens, and in same time span there were 57 deaths of Swiss citizens and 5 non-Swiss citizen deaths. Ignoring immigration and emigration, the population of Swiss citizens decreased by 19 while the foreign population decreased by 3. There were 3 Swiss men and 20 Swiss women who immigrated back to Switzerland. At the same time, there were 25 non-Swiss men and 10 non-Swiss women who immigrated from another country to Switzerland. The total Swiss population change in 2008 (from all sources) was an increase of 9 and the non-Swiss population change was a decrease of 2 people. This represents a population growth rate of 0.1%.

The age distribution, as of 2009, in the Vallemaggia District is: 518 children or 8.8% of the population are between 0 and 9 years old and 667 teenagers or 11.4% are between 10 and 19. Of the adult population, 565 people or 9.6% of the population are between 20 and 29 years old. 656 people or 11.2% are between 30 and 39, 962 people or 16.4% are between 40 and 49, and 859 people or 14.6% are between 50 and 59. The senior population distribution is 729 people or 12.4% of the population are between 60 and 69 years old, 493 people or 8.4% are between 70 and 79, there are 422 people or 7.2% who are over 80.

In 2000 there were 7,245 single family homes (or 80.1% of the total) out of a total of 9,049 inhabited buildings. There were 972 two family buildings (10.7%) and 533 multi-family buildings (5.9%). There were also 299 buildings in the district that were multipurpose buildings (used for both housing and commercial or another purpose).

In 2000 there were 4,844 apartments in the district. The most common apartment size was the 4 room apartment of which there were 1,334. There were 400 single room apartments and 1,203 apartments with five or more rooms. Of these apartments, a total of 2,195 apartments (45.3% of the total) were permanently occupied, while 2,620 apartments (54.1%) were seasonally occupied and 29 apartments (0.6%) were empty.

The historical population is given in the following table:

year	population
1850	7,482
1880	6,388
1900	5,195
1950	4,581
1980	4,650
1990	5,021
2000	5,593

== Politics ==
In the 2007 federal election the most popular party was the FDP which received 29.82% of the vote. The next three most popular parties were the CVP (28.74%), the SP (17.31%) and the Ticino League (12.2%). In the federal election, a total of 1,907 votes were cast, and the voter turnout was 45.8%.

In the 2007 Ticino Gran Consiglio election, there were a total of 4,190 registered voters in the Vallemaggia District, of which 2,778 or 66.3% voted. 28 blank ballots were cast, leaving 2,750 valid ballots in the election. The most popular party was the PPD+GenGiova which received 693 or 25.2% of the vote. The next three most popular parties were; the SSI (with 564 or 20.5%), the PLRT (with 511 or 18.6%) and the PS (with 436 or 15.9%).

In the 2007 Ticino Consiglio di Stato election, 22 blank ballots and 9 null ballots were cast, leaving 2,747 valid ballots in the election. The most popular party was the PPD which received 701 or 25.5% of the vote. The next three most popular parties were; the LEGA (with 518 or 18.9%), the PS (with 511 or 18.6%) and the PLRT (with 484 or 17.6%).

== Religion ==
From the 2000 census, 4,575 or 81.8% were Roman Catholic, while 319 or 5.7% belonged to the Swiss Reformed Church. There are 441 individuals (or about 7.88% of the population) who belong to another church (not listed on the census), and 258 individuals (or about 4.61% of the population) did not answer the question.

== Education ==
In the Vallemaggia District there was a total of 1,005 students (as of 2009). The Ticino education system provides up to three years of non-mandatory kindergarten and in the Vallemaggia District there were 135 children in kindergarten. The primary school program lasts for five years and includes both a standard school and a special school. In the district, 302 students attended the standard primary schools and 7 students attended the special school. In the lower secondary school system, students either attend a two-year middle school followed by a two-year pre-apprenticeship or they attend a four-year program to prepare for higher education. There were 267 students in the two-year middle school and 2 in their pre-apprenticeship, while 86 students were in the four-year advanced program.

The upper secondary school includes several options, but at the end of the upper secondary program, a student will be prepared to enter a trade or to continue on to a university or college. In Ticino, vocational students may either attend school while working on their internship or apprenticeship (which takes three or four years) or may attend school followed by an internship or apprenticeship (which takes one year as a full-time student or one and a half to two years as a part-time student). There were 53 vocational students who were attending school full-time and 132 who attend part-time.

The professional program lasts three years and prepares a student for a job in engineering, nursing, computer science, business, tourism and similar fields. There were 21 students in the professional program.

== Cities ==
The District has 8 municipalities, namely Bosco Gurin, Campo, Cerentino, Cevio and Linescio in the Rovana Valley, and Maggia and Avegno Gordevio in the Valle Maggia, as well as Lavizzara in the Valle Lavizzara.

Circle of the Rovana
Coat of arms	Municipality	Population (31 December 2020)	Area km^{2}
Cevio	Cevio	1,142	151.42
Linescio	Linescio	42	6.61
Cerentino	Cerentino	40	20.07
Campo (Vallemaggia)	Campo (Vallemaggia)	49	43.27
Bosco/Gurin	Bosco/Gurin	52	22.04
	Total	1,325	243.41

Circle of the Maggia
Coat of arms	Municipality	Population (31 December 2020)	Area km^{2}
Maggia	Maggia	2,611	111.09
Avegno Gordevio	Avegno Gordevio	1,516	27.34
	Total	4,127	138.43

Circle of the Lavizzara
Coat of arms	Municipality	Population (31 December 2020)	Area km^{2}
Lavizzara	Lavizzara	500	187.50
	Total	500	187.5
