= Lago d'Alzasca =

Lake in Ticino, Switzerland

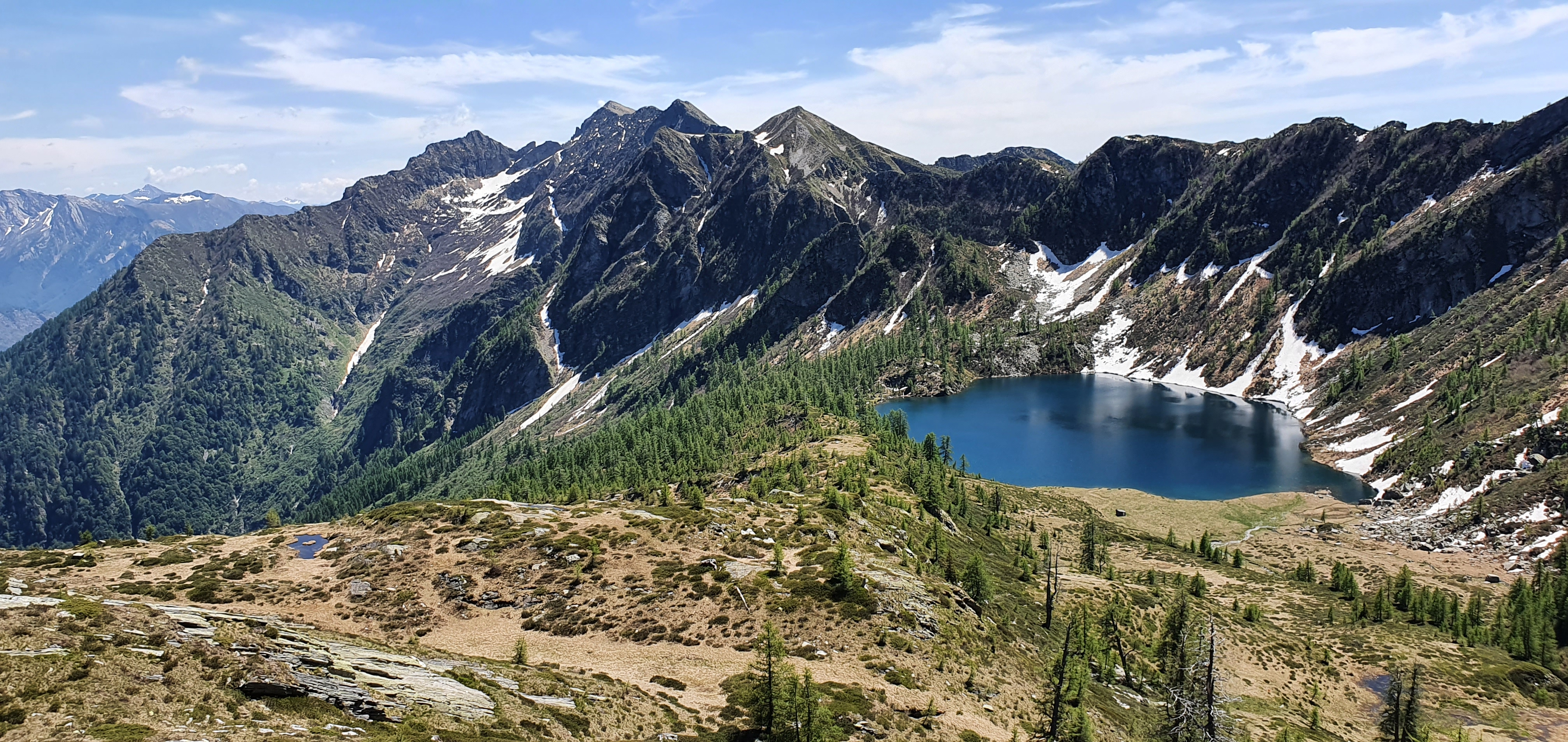

- Location within Canton of Ticino Location within Switzerland Location within Italy Location within Alps
- Interactive map of Lago d'Alzasca
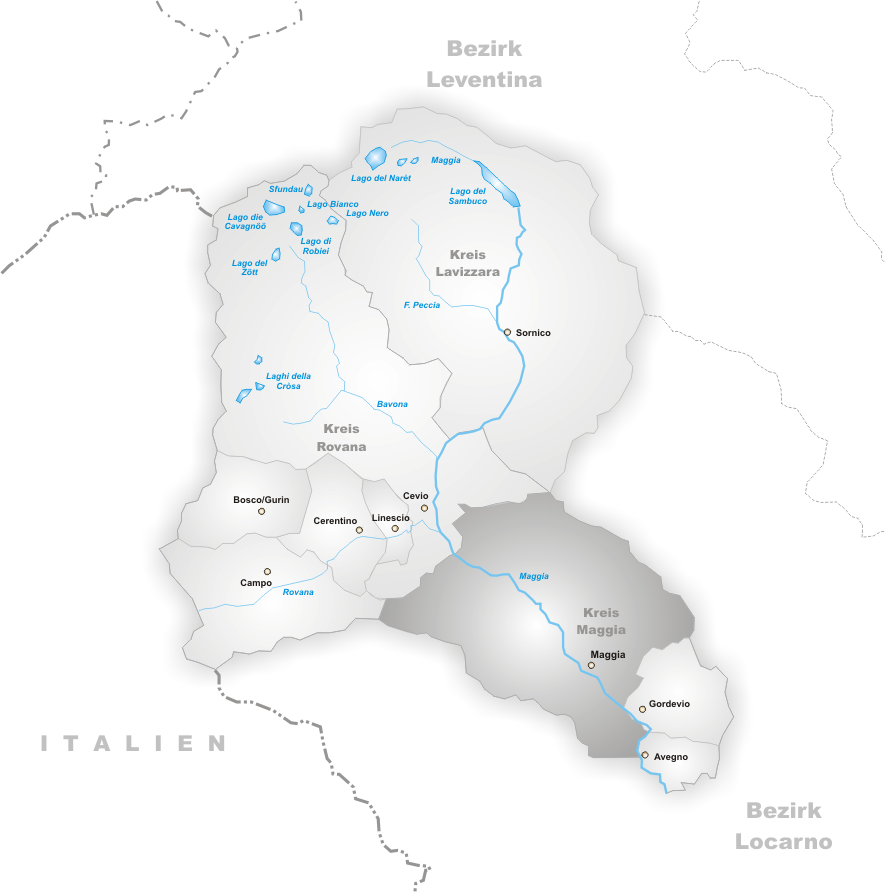
- Location: Ticino
- Coordinates: 46.26654°N 8.58725°E
- Basin countries: Switzerland
- Surface area: 10 ha (25 acres)
- Surface elevation: 1,857 m (6,093 ft)

Lago d'Alzasca is a small alpine lake in the canton of Ticino, southern Switzerland. Its surface area is 10 ha (25 acres).

It is situated in a high-mountain environment characterized by steep alpine slopes, rocky terrain, typical of subalpine and alpine zones. It is part of a remote natural landscape above the Maggia Valley, an area known for its pristine scenery and traditional mountain views.

Lago d’Alzasca is a natural mountain lake formed in a glacially influenced basin. Like many similar lakes in the region, the water level and surface area can vary seasonally depending on snow accumulation and melting cycles.

The lake and its surroundings have a range of alpine flora adapted to harsh climatic conditions, including short growing seasons and, rough winters with low temperatures. Wildlife in the broader region may include species adapted to mountainous habitats, such as chamois, marmots, and various alpine bird species.

Lago d’Alzasca is accessible by hiking trails from the Maggia Valley. The routes leading to the lake are generally considered demanding due to significant elevation gain and rugged terrain.

The lake visits are usually limited to experienced hikers and mountain enthusiasts.

It remains largely undeveloped, secluded and preserving its natural alpine character.

== See also ==
- Alpine lakes of Switzerland
- List of mountain lakes of Switzerland
- Maggia Valley
- Ticino
- Val Verzasca
