= Linescio =

- Municipality
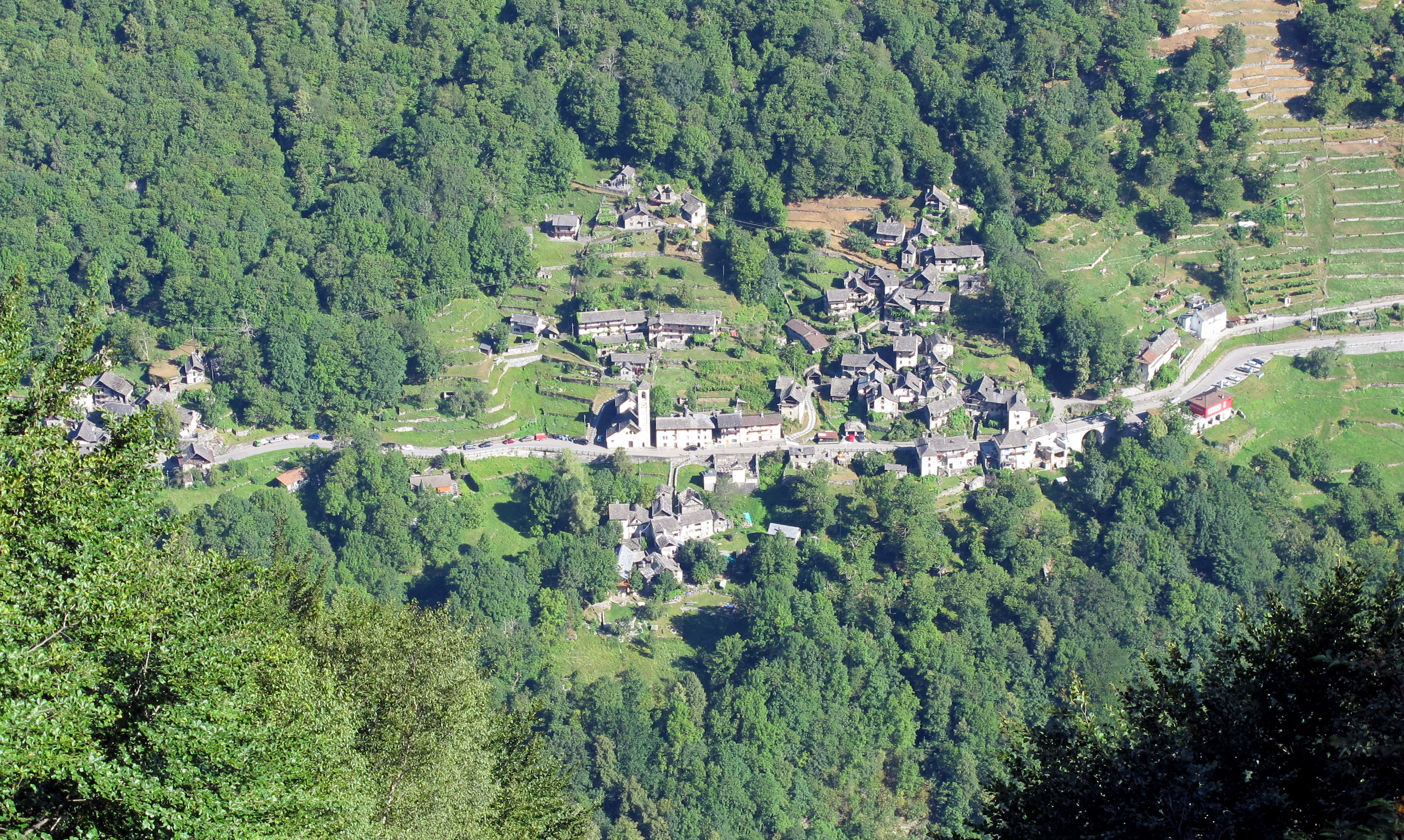

- Flag Coat of arms
- Location of Linescio
- Location within Switzerland Location within Canton of Ticino
- Coordinates: 46°18′N 8°35′E
- Country: Switzerland
- Canton: Ticino
- District: Vallemaggia

Government
  - Mayor: Sindaco

Area
  - Total: 6.61 km^{2} (2.55 sq mi)
- Elevation: 668 m (2,192 ft)

Population (December 2004)
  - Total: 42
  - Density: 6.4/km^{2} (16/sq mi)
- Time zone: UTC+01:00 (CET)
  - Summer (DST): UTC+02:00 (CEST)
- Postal code: 6682
- SFOS number: 5315
- ISO 3166 code: CH-TI
- Surrounded by: Cerentino, Cevio
- Website: https://www.linescio.ch/

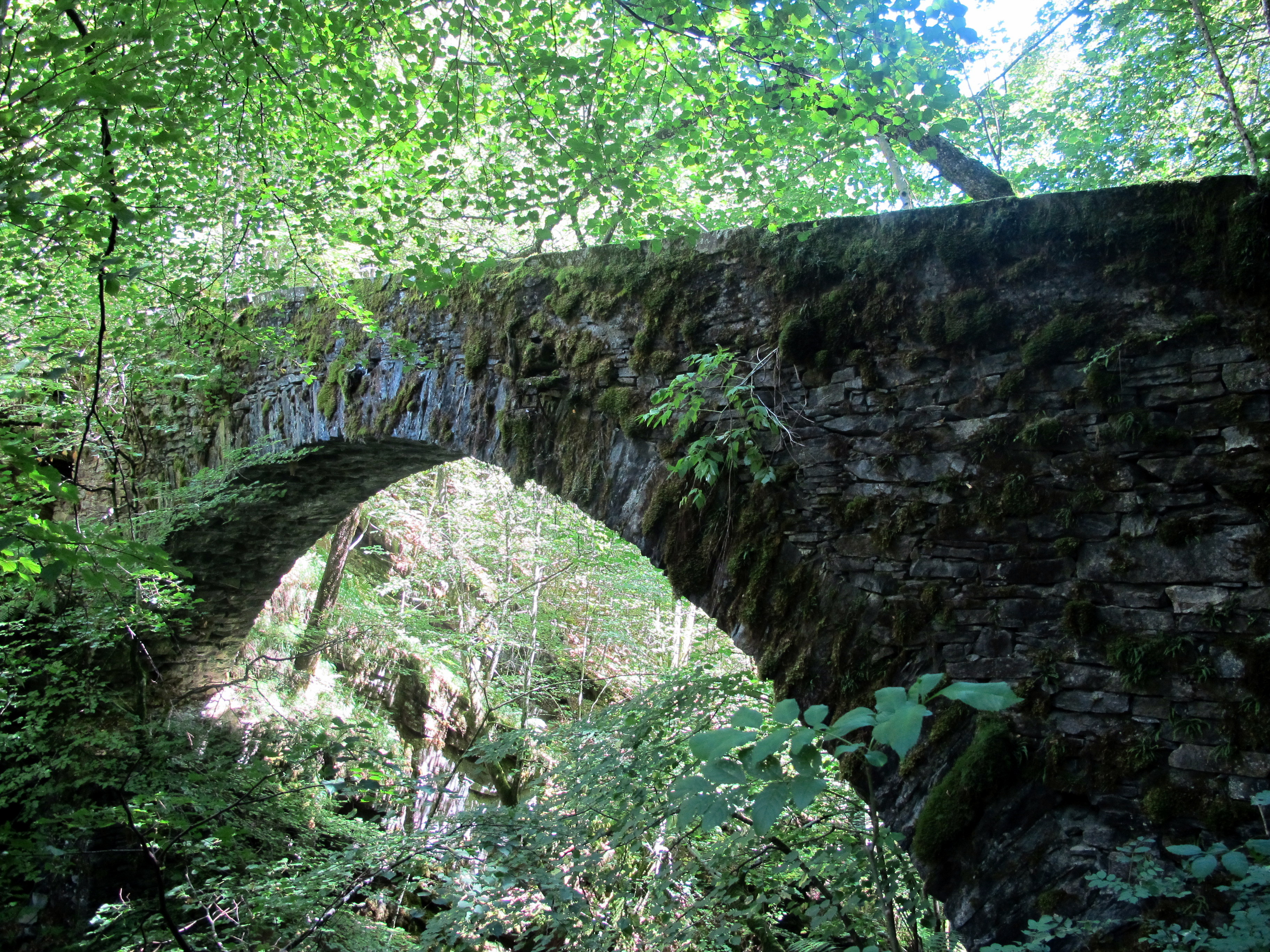
Stonebridge over the river Rovana

Linescio is a municipality in the district of Vallemaggia in the canton of Ticino in Switzerland.

== History ==
Linescio is first mentioned in 1437 as Lignazio. In 1602 it was mentioned as Linezio.

The parish church of S. Remigio was built in 1640 and rebuilt in 1817–19. In 1757, it split away from the parish of Cevio to become its own parish.

The slopes around the village were heavily terraced, creating most of the farm land for the village. Rye, hemp, flax and later potatoes were grown on the terraces. As a result of emigration out of Switzerland in the 19th century and emigration to the cities after 1950, most of the fields, meadows and pastures were abandoned. In 2000, no one in Linescio worked in agriculture. On the right side of the valley, there is some mining. At the beginning of the 21st century a project was developed to save the terraces from decay.

== Geography ==
Linescio has an area, as of 1997, of 6.61 square kilometers (2.55 sq mi). Of this area, 0.1 km^{2} (0.039 sq mi) or 1.5% is used for agricultural purposes, while 4.32 km^{2} (1.67 sq mi) or 65.4% is forested. Of the rest of the land, 0.08 km^{2} (20 acres) or 1.2% is settled (buildings or roads), 0.12 km^{2} (30 acres) or 1.8% is either rivers or lakes and 1.97 km^{2} (0.76 sq mi) or 29.8% is unproductive land. Of the built up area, housing and buildings made up 0.9% and transportation infrastructure made up 0.0%. Out of the forested land, 56.9% of the total land area is heavily forested and 5.6% is covered with orchards or small clusters of trees. Of the agricultural land, 0.6% is used for growing crops. All the water in the municipality is flowing water. Of the unproductive areas, 17.7% is unproductive vegetation and 12.1% is too rocky for vegetation.

The village is located in the Vallemaggio district, on the left side of the lower portion of the Valle di Campo. It was created in 1858, when the village separated from Cevio.

== Coat of arms ==
The blazon of the municipal coat of arms is Quartered argent and azure a dove displayed counterchanged. The dove is an attribute of Saint Remigius, the patron saint of the village church.

== Demographics ==
Linescio has a population (as of December 2020) of 42. As of 2008, 8.2% of the population are resident foreign nationals.

Most of the population (as of 2000) speaks Italian language (26 or 81.3%) with the rest speaking German

As of 2008, the gender distribution of the population was 45.7% male and 54.3% female. The population was made up of 18 Swiss men (39.1% of the population), and 3 (6.5%) non-Swiss men. There were 24 Swiss women (52.2%), and 1 (2.2%) non-Swiss women. Of the population in the village 16 or about 50.0% were born in Linescio and lived there in 2000. There were 6 or 18.8% who were born in the same canton, while 7 or 21.9% were born somewhere else in Switzerland, and 3 or 9.4% were born outside of Switzerland.

In 2008 there were no live births to Swiss citizens and 3 deaths of Swiss citizens. Ignoring immigration and emigration, the population of Swiss citizens decreased by 3 while the foreign population remained the same. The total Swiss population change in 2008 (from all sources, including moves across municipal borders) was an increase of 4 and the non-Swiss population change was a decrease of 1 people. This represents a population growth rate of 6.5%.

The age distribution, as of 2009, in Linescio is; 1 child is between 0 and 9 years old. Of the adult population, 5 people or 10.9% of the population are between 20 and 29 years old. 7 people or 15.2% are between 30 and 39, 8 people or 17.4% are between 40 and 49, and 9 people or 19.6% are between 50 and 59. The senior population distribution is 6 people or 13.0% of the population are between 60 and 69 years old, 4 people or 8.7% are between 70 and 79, there are 6 people or 13.0% who are over 80.

As of 2000, there were 13 people who were single and never married in the village. There were 12 married individuals, 1 widows or widowers and 6 individuals who are divorced.

There were 10 households that consist of only one person and 1 household with five or more people. Out of a total of 19 households that answered this question, 52.6% were households made up of just one person. Of the rest of the households, there are 3 married couples without children, 2 married couples with children There was 1 single parent with a child or children. There were 3 households that were made up unrelated people.

In 2000 there were 101 single family homes (or 97.1% of the total) out of a total of 104 inhabited buildings. There was 1 multi-family buildings (1.0%), along with 1 multi-purpose buildings that were mostly used for housing (1.0%) and 1 other use buildings (commercial or industrial) that also had some housing (1.0%). Of the single family homes 12 were built before 1919, while none were built between 1990 and 2000. The greatest number of single family homes (75) were built between 1919 and 1945.

In 2000 there were 104 apartments in the village. The most common apartment size was 4 rooms of which there were 26. There were 16 single room apartments and 24 apartments with five or more rooms. Of these apartments, a total of 19 apartments (18.3% of the total) were permanently occupied, while 85 apartments (81.7%) were seasonally occupied.

The historical population is given in the following chart:

== Sights ==
The entire village of Linescio is designated as part of the Inventory of Swiss Heritage Sites

== Politics ==
In the 2007 federal election the most popular party was the FDP which received 46.67% of the vote. The next three most popular parties were the SP (30.83%), the Green Party (21.67%) and the PdA Party (0.83%). In the federal election, a total of 15 votes were cast, and the voter turnout was 32.6%.

In the 2007 Gran Consiglio election, there were a total of 45 registered voters in Linescio, of which 23 or 51.1% voted. 1 blank ballot was cast, leaving 22 valid ballots in the election. The most popular party was the PLRT which received 12 or 54.5% of the vote. The next three most popular parties were; the MPS (with 4 or 18.2%), the SSI (with 3 or 13.6%) and the PPD+GenGiova (with 1 or 4.5%).

In the 2007 Consiglio di Stato election, The most popular party was the PLRT which received 13 or 56.5% of the vote. The next two most popular parties were; the PS (with 5 or 21.7%) and the PPD (with 2 or 8.7%).

== Economy ==
There were 13 residents of the village who were employed in some capacity, of which females made up 38.5% of the workforce. In 2008 the total number of full-time equivalent jobs was 19. The number of jobs in the primary sector was 2, all of which were in agriculture. The number of jobs in the secondary sector was 17.

In 2000, there were 8 workers who commuted away from the village.

== Religion ==
From the 2000 census, 24 or 75.0% were Roman Catholic, while 1 or 3.1% belonged to the Swiss Reformed Church. There were 6 (or about 18.75% of the population) who belonged to no church, are agnostic or atheist, and 1 individual (or about 3.13% of the population) did not answer the question.

== Education ==
In Linescio about 14 or (43.8%) of the population have completed non-mandatory upper secondary education, and or (0.0%) have completed additional higher education (either university or a Fachhochschule). In Linescio there was 1 student, who was in kindergarten (as of 2009).

As of 2000, there were 2 students from Linescio who attended schools outside the village.
