= Cerentino =

- Municipality
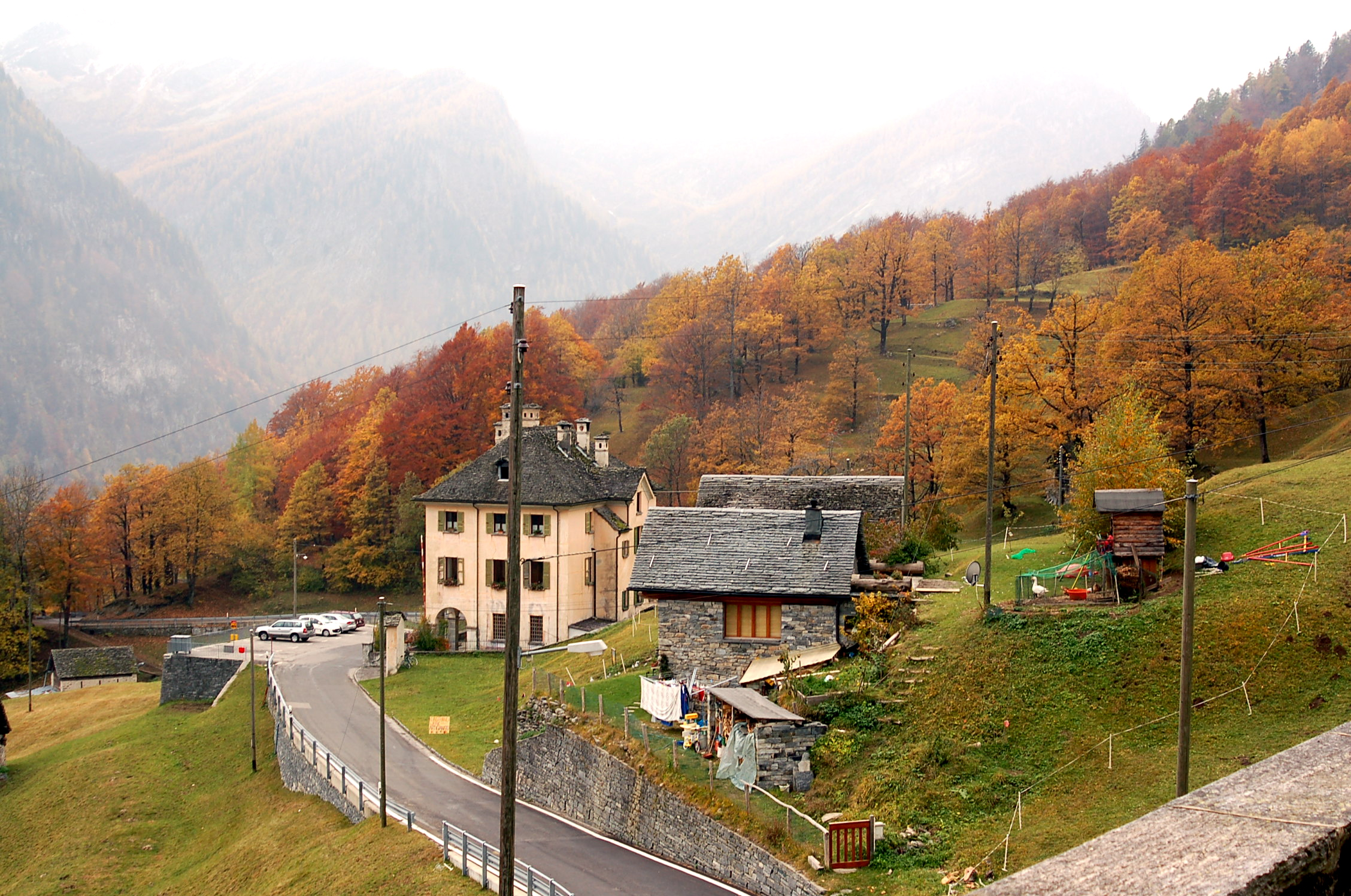
- Cerentino village

- Flag Coat of arms
- Location of Cerentino
- Location within Switzerland Location within Canton of Ticino
- Coordinates: 46°18′N 8°32′E
- Country: Switzerland
- Canton: Ticino
- District: Vallemaggia

Government
  - Mayor: Sindaco

Area
  - Total: 20.07 km^{2} (7.75 sq mi)
- Elevation: 981 m (3,219 ft)

Population (December 2004)
  - Total: 69
  - Density: 3.4/km^{2} (8.9/sq mi)
- Time zone: UTC+01:00 (CET)
  - Summer (DST): UTC+02:00 (CEST)
- Postal code: 6683
- SFOS number: 5309
- ISO 3166 code: CH-TI
- Surrounded by: Bosco/Gurin, Campo (Vallemaggia), Cevio, Linescio
- Website: www.cerentino.ch

Cerentino is a municipality in the district of Vallemaggia in the canton of Ticino in Switzerland.

== History ==
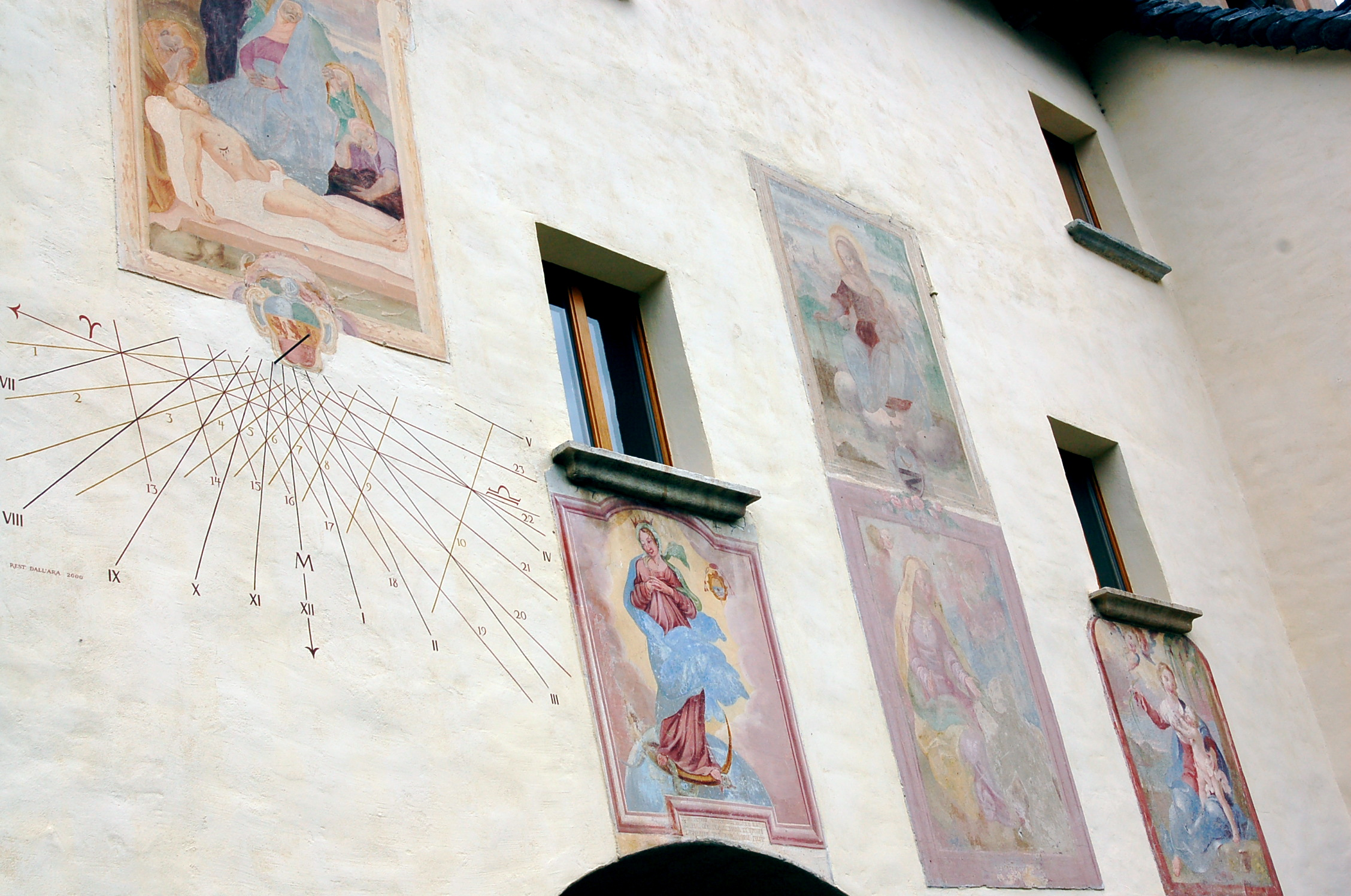
Frescoes on the village church from the 17th Century

During the mid-19th Century, the population declined sharply due to emigration to other countries and a rural exodus. The parish church of Madonna delle Grazie was already in operation in the 15th Century. It was expanded in the beginning of the 16th Century. In 1513, it broke away from the parish of Cevio. The church contains frescoes and stucco from the 17th century.

The soil around Cerentino is rich in limestone, which was used in construction and in the production of lime for mortar. The villages are threatened by landslides and continual erosion.

Modernly, animal husbandry and agriculture, which earlier granted the villages a far-reaching self-sufficiency, is still main income source of most residents. In the summer months there is some tourism to the municipality.

== Geography ==
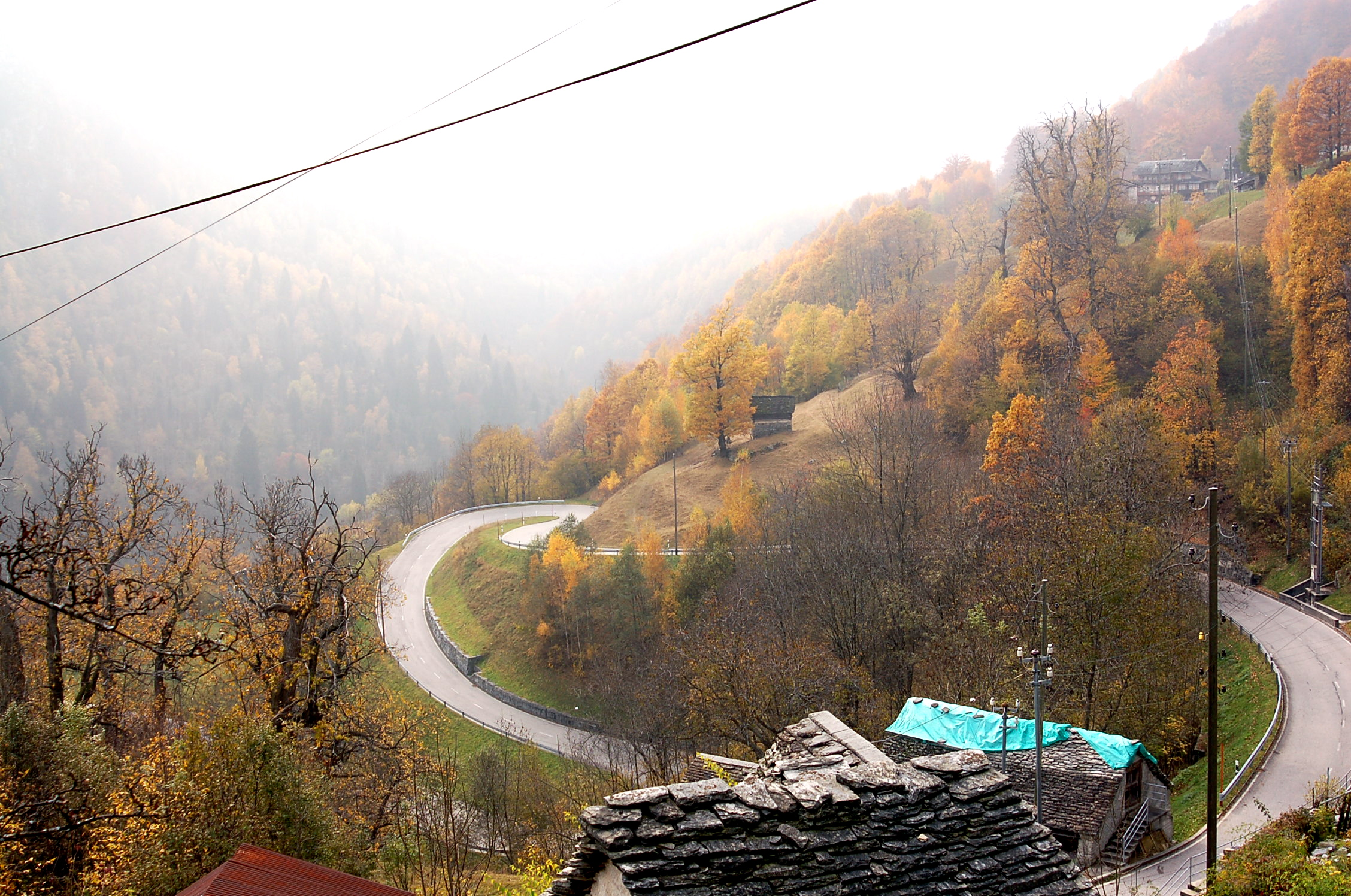
The road into Cerentino is narrow and windy

Cerentino has an area, as of 1997, of 20.07 square kilometers (7.75 sq mi). Of this area, 0.38 km^{2} (0.15 sq mi) or 1.9% is used for agricultural purposes, while 13.32 km^{2} (5.14 sq mi) or 66.4% is forested. Of the rest of the land, 0.36 km^{2} (0.14 sq mi) or 1.8% is settled (buildings or roads), 0.25 km^{2} (0.097 sq mi) or 1.2% is either rivers or lakes and 5.31 km^{2} (2.05 sq mi) or 26.5% is unproductive land.

Of the built up area, housing and buildings made up 0.3% and transportation infrastructure made up 0.8%. Out of the forested land, 54.0% of the total land area is heavily forested and 6.6% is covered with orchards or small clusters of trees. Of the agricultural land, 1.6% is used for growing crops. All the water in the municipality is flowing water. Of the unproductive areas, 17.0% is unproductive vegetation and 9.5% is too rocky for vegetation.

The municipality is located in the Vallemaggia district, at the confluence of the Rovana river with the stream of the Valle di Bosco. It consists of nine inhabited settlements as well as two abandoned ones. The settlements are quite isolated from each other and the rest of the canton. The main settlement is located at an elevation of 979 m (3,212 ft).

== Coat of arms ==
The blazon of the municipal coat of arms is Azure on a base bent a deer trippant or.

== Demographics ==
Cerentino has a population (as of December 2020) of 40. As of 2008, 7.7% of the population are resident foreign nationals. Over the last 10 years (1997–2007) the population has changed at a rate of 18.9%. Most of the population (as of 2000) speaks Italian language (52 or 89.7%), with German being second most common (5 or 8.6%) and French being third (1 or 1.7%).

As of 2008, the gender distribution of the population was 52.6% male and 47.4% female. The population was made up of 27 Swiss men (47.4% of the population), and 3 (5.3%) non-Swiss men. There were 25 Swiss women (43.9%), and 2 (3.5%) non-Swiss women. Of the population in the municipality 32 or about 55.2% were born in Cerentino and lived there in 2000. There were 15 or 25.9% who were born in the same canton, while 4 or 6.9% were born somewhere else in Switzerland, and 6 or 10.3% were born outside of Switzerland.

In 2008 there was 1 live birth to Swiss citizens. Ignoring immigration and emigration, the population of Swiss citizens increased by 1 while the foreign population remained the same. There was 1 Swiss woman who immigrated back to Switzerland. At the same time, there were 2 non-Swiss men who immigrated from another country to Switzerland and 1 non-Swiss woman who emigrated from Switzerland to another country. The total Swiss population change in 2008 (from all sources, including moves across municipal borders) was an increase of 2 and the non-Swiss population remained the same. This represents a population growth rate of 3.2%.

The age distribution, as of 2009, in Cerentino is; 3 children or 5.3% of the population are between 0 and 9 years old and 5 teenagers or 8.8% are between 10 and 19. Of the adult population, 5 people or 8.8% of the population are between 20 and 29 years old. 8 people or 14.0% are between 30 and 39, 7 people or 12.3% are between 40 and 49, and 8 people or 14.0% are between 50 and 59. The senior population distribution is 6 people or 10.5% of the population are between 60 and 69 years old, 7 people or 12.3% are between 70 and 79, there are 8 people or 14.0% who are over 80.

As of 2000, there were 28 people who were single and never married in the municipality. There were 20 married individuals, 8 widows or widowers and 2 individuals who are divorced.

As of 2000 the average number of residents per living room was 0.49 which is fewer people per room than the cantonal average of 0.6 per room. In this case, a room is defined as space of a housing unit of at least 4 m^{2} (43 sq ft) as normal bedrooms, dining rooms, living rooms, kitchens and habitable cellars and attics. About 60.7% of the total households were owner occupied, or in other words did not pay rent (though they may have a mortgage or a rent-to-own agreement).

As of 2000, there were 28 private households in the municipality, and an average of 1.9 persons per household. There were 13 households that consist of only one person and 1 household with five or more people. Out of a total of 30 households that answered this question, 43.3% were households made up of just one person and 2 were adults who lived with their parents. Of the rest of the households, there are 5 married couples without children, 3 married couples with children There were 4 single parents with a child or children. There was 1 household that was made up of unrelated people and 2 households that were made up of some sort of institution or another collective housing.

In 2000 there were 87 single family homes (or 80.6% of the total) out of a total of 108 inhabited buildings. There were 15 multi-family buildings (13.9%), and 6 other use buildings (commercial or industrial) that also had some housing (5.6%). Of the single family homes 3 were built before 1919, while none were built between 1990 and 2000. The greatest number of single family homes (40) were built between 1919 and 1945.

In 2000 there were 128 apartments in the municipality. The most common apartment size was 4 rooms of which there were 39. There were 10 single room apartments and 23 apartments with five or more rooms. Of these apartments, a total of 28 apartments (21.9% of the total) were permanently occupied, while 100 apartments (78.1%) were seasonally occupied. As of 2007, the construction rate of new housing units was 0 new units per 1000 residents. The vacancy rate for the municipality, in 2008, was 0%.

The historical population is given in the following chart:

== Sights ==
The entire small village of Corino is designated as part of the Inventory of Swiss Heritage Sites

== Economy ==
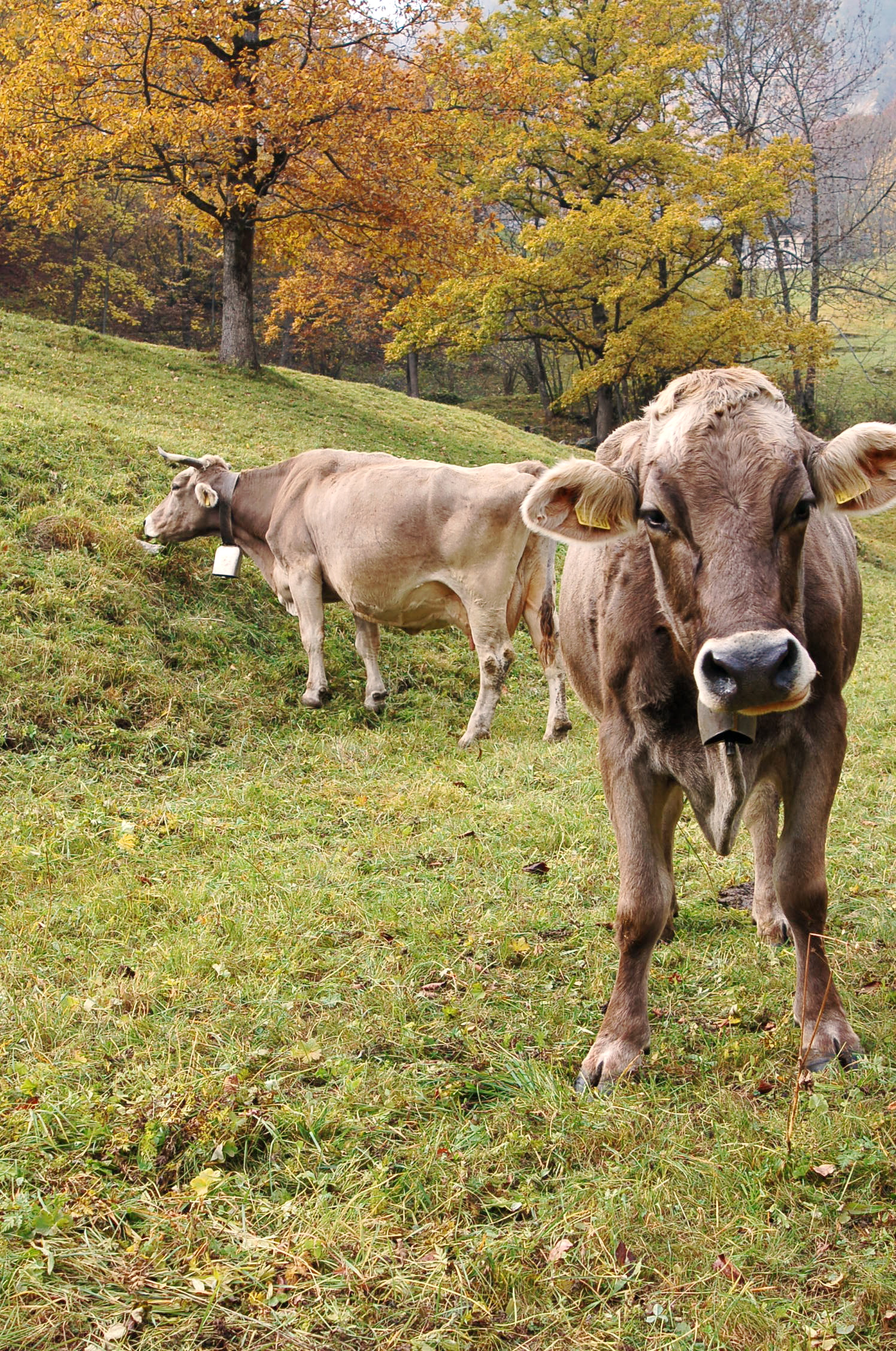
Agriculture still dominates the village economy. Cows near Cerentino

As of 2007, Cerentino had an unemployment rate of 4.33%. As of 2005, there were 14 people employed in the primary economic sector and about 5 businesses involved in this sector. 2 people were employed in the secondary sector and there was 1 business in this sector. 4 people were employed in the tertiary sector, with 2 businesses in this sector. There were 24 residents of the municipality who were employed in some capacity, of which females made up 33.3% of the workforce.

In 2008 the total number of full-time equivalent jobs was 12. The number of jobs in the primary sector was 9, all of which were in agriculture. The number of jobs in the secondary sector was 2, both of which were in manufacturing. The number of jobs in the tertiary sector was 1.

In 2000, there were 7 workers who commuted into the municipality and 9 workers who commuted away. The municipality is a net exporter of workers, with about 1.3 workers leaving the municipality for every one entering. Of the working population, 4.2% used public transportation to get to work, and 41.7% used a private car.

== Politics ==
In the 2007 federal election the most popular party was the FDP which received 48.65% of the vote. The next three most popular parties were the SP (29.05%), the CVP (14.86%) and the Ticino League (5.41%). In the federal election, a total of 19 votes were cast, and the voter turnout was 35.2%.

In the 2007 Gran Consiglio election, there were a total of 55 registered voters in Cerentino, of which 29 or 52.7% voted. The most popular party was the PS which received 8 or 27.6% of the vote. The next three most popular parties were; the PS (with 8 or 27.6%), the PLRT (with 6 or 20.7%) and the PPD+GenGiova (with 4 or 13.8%).

In the 2007 Consiglio di Stato election, 1 null ballot was cast, leaving 28 valid ballots in the election. The most popular party was the PS which received 8 or 28.6% of the vote. The next three most popular parties were; the LEGA (with 6 or 21.4%), the PLRT (with 5 or 17.9%) and the PPD (with 4 or 14.3%).

== Religion ==
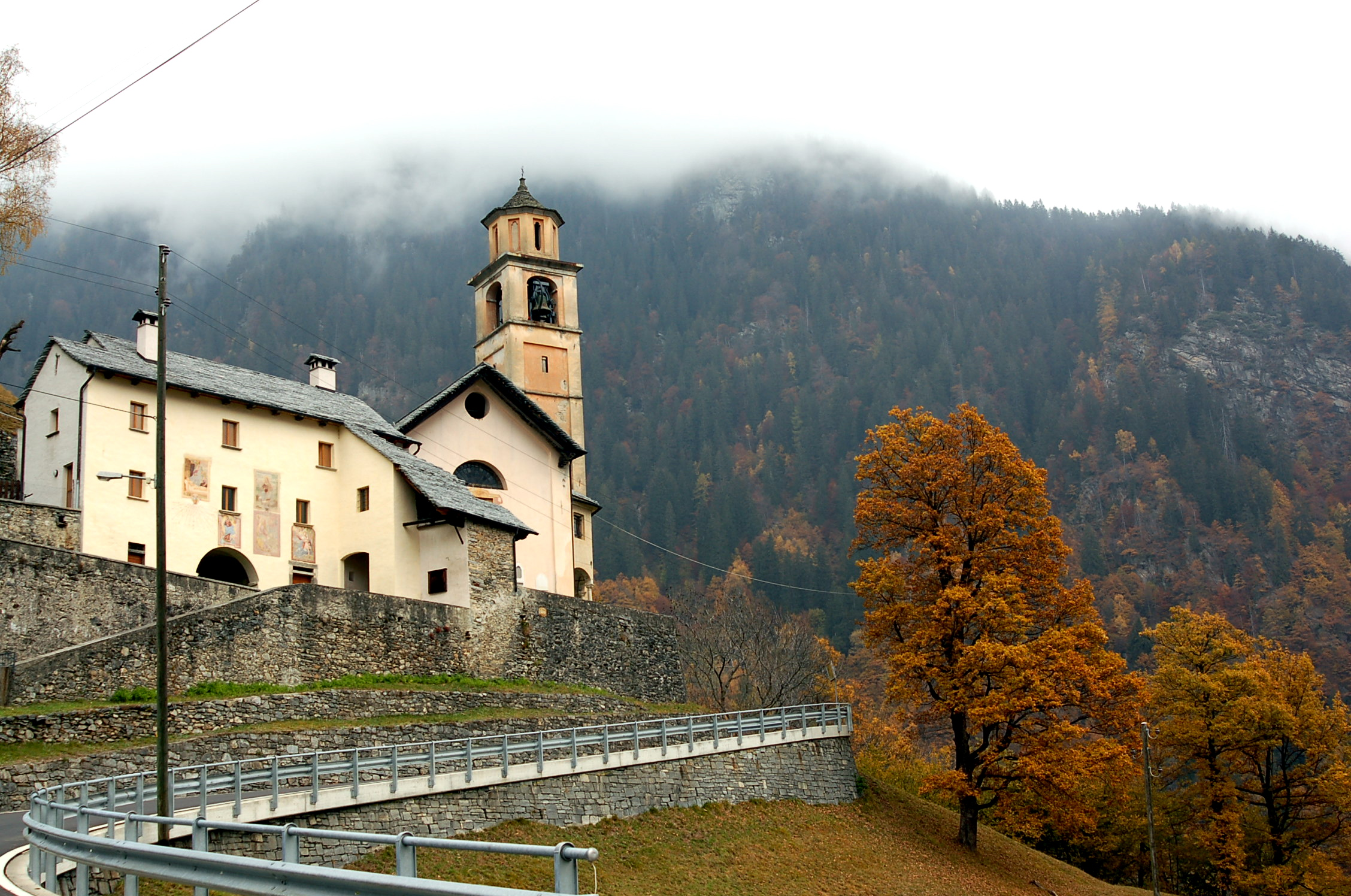
Village Church in Cerentino

From the 2000 census, 41 or 70.7% were Roman Catholic, while 6 or 10.3% belonged to the Swiss Reformed Church. There was 1 individual who was Islamic. 7 (or about 12.07% of the population) belonged to no church, are agnostic or atheist, and 3 individuals (or about 5.17% of the population) did not answer the question.

== Education ==
In Cerentino about 17 or (29.3%) of the population have completed non-mandatory upper secondary education, and 2 or (3.4%) have completed additional higher education (either university or a Fachhochschule). Of the 2 who completed tertiary schooling, they both were Swiss women.

In Cerentino there were a total of 8 students (as of 2009). The Ticino education system provides up to three years of non-mandatory kindergarten and in Cerentino there was 1 child in kindergarten. The primary school program lasts for five years. In the municipality, 4 students attended the standard primary schools. In the lower secondary school system, students either attend a two-year middle school followed by a two-year pre-apprenticeship or they attend a four-year program to prepare for higher education. There were 3 students in the two-year middle school, while 0 students were in the four-year advanced program. There were no students in the upper secondary program.

As of 2000, there were 6 students from Cerentino who attended schools outside the municipality.
