= Bignasco =

- Former municipality
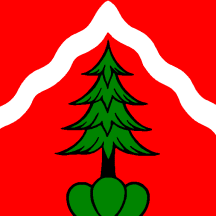
- Flag Coat of arms
- Location of Bignasco
- Location within Switzerland Location within Canton of Ticino
- Coordinates: 46°20′N 8°36′E
- Country: Switzerland
- Canton: Ticino
- District: Vallemaggia

Area
  - Total: 81.43 km^{2} (31.44 sq mi)
- Elevation: 443 m (1,453 ft)

Population (December 2004)
  - Total: 306
  - Density: 3.76/km^{2} (9.73/sq mi)
- Time zone: UTC+01:00 (CET)
  - Summer (DST): UTC+02:00 (CEST)
- Postal code: 6676
- SFOS number: 5303
- ISO 3166 code: CH-TI
- Website: SFSO statistics

Bignasco is a village in the district of Vallemaggia, in the canton of Ticino, Switzerland, consolidated into the adjacent municipality of Cevio.

== Geography ==
Bignasco is a village situated at the confluence of the river Maggia and the Bavona in the Swiss canton of Ticino, near the Italian border.

== History ==
As of 1230 documented as Bugnascho. In the 14th century Bignasco, Cavergno, Menzonio and Brontallo formed a single cooperative, but each village remained autonomous. In 1483, the parish Bignasco dissolved from Cevio. In 1781 Bignasco was given the right to hold two fairs. In 1786, Bignasco and Cavergno split. During the eighteenth century a constant stream of emigrants went to Italy and Holland, while in the 19th century, Bignasco was not much affected by a mass emigration. For centuries, the main occupations of the inhabitants were agriculture and livestock, crafts and the occupations of seasonal emigrants; The use of hydropower at the beginning of the 1960s brought in infrastructure and jobs.

From 1907–65, Bignasco was the terminus of the railway connecting the Maggia Valley with Locarno. Gneis was transported by rail out of the valley and German and English tourists traveled up the valley.

Bignasco was the largest municipality in the district by area and also included the hamlet of San Carlo in the Valle Bavona.

On 22 October 2006 Bignasco forfeited its status as an independent municipality when, together with the village of Cavergno, it was consolidated into the municipality of Cevio.

== Churches ==
The parish church dedicated to the Archangel Michael in the 15th century was renovated several times. The chapel of S. Maria del Ponte is adorned with frescoes from 1512. There are 2 buildings from the 16th century, two torbe (granaries on stilts) and a 17th-century bridge.

== Population ==
In 1669 there were 103 fireplaces, by 1801 215 inhabitants, by 1850 202, in 1900 179, 1920 143, 1950 186 and in 2000 306 inhabitants.

== Famous people ==
- Carla del Ponte, former war crimes prosecutor and former Swiss Attorney-General (*1947).
