= Ticino (river) =

Tributary of the Po river

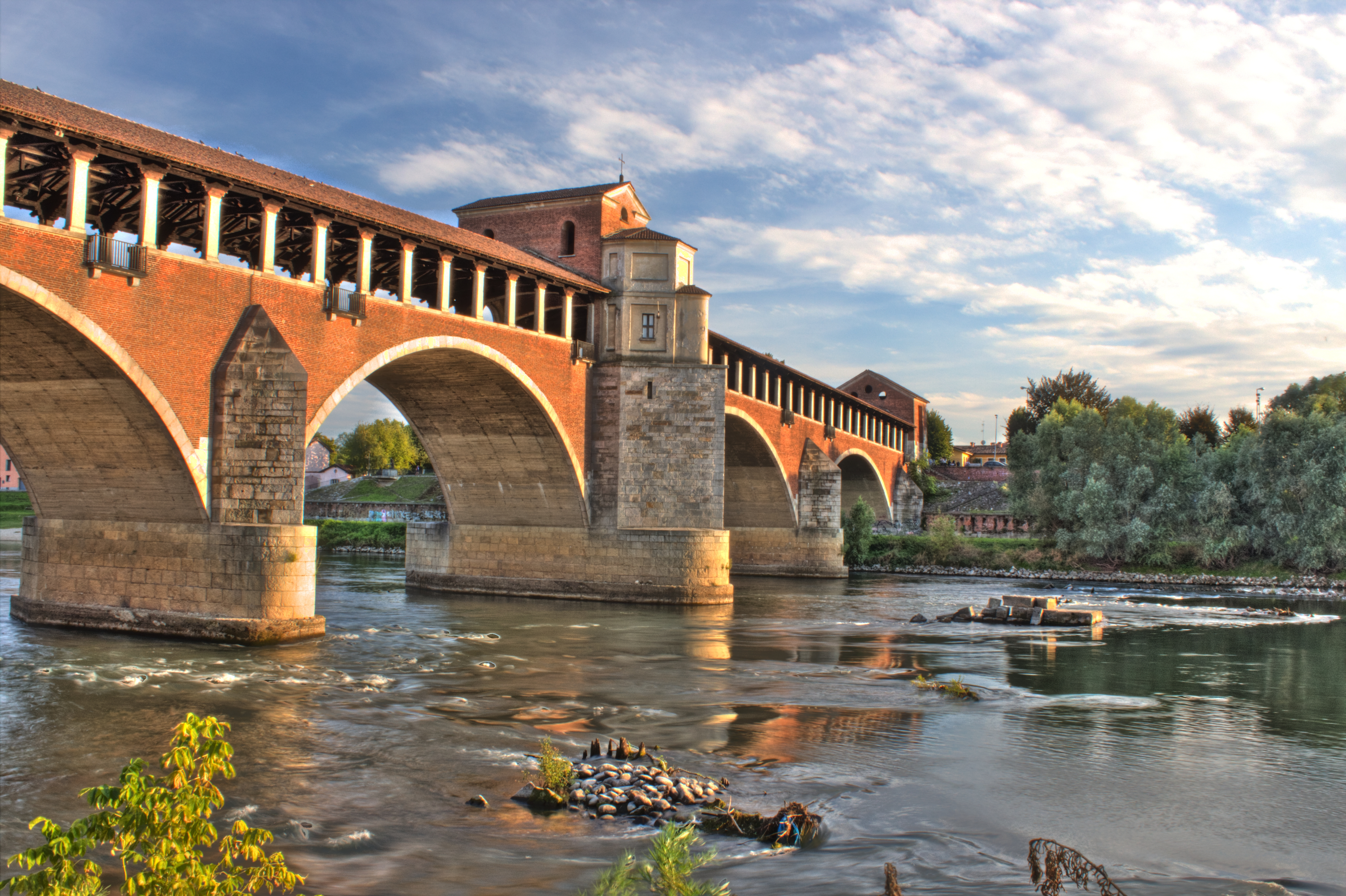
- The Ticino and the Ponte Coperto of Pavia (originally medieval in date, rebuilt in 1950 after the destruction due to war bombing)

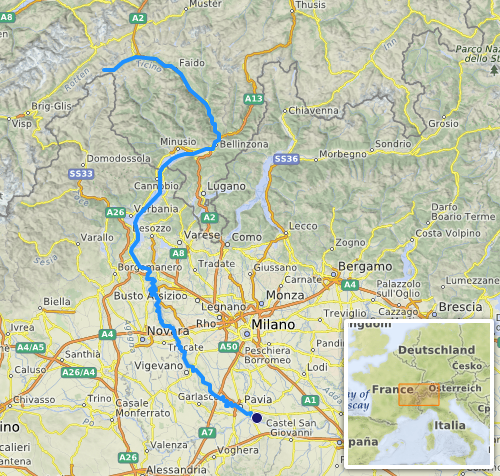
- Native name: Tesin (Lombard)

Location
- Country: Switzerland, Italy

Physical characteristics
- Source
  - location: Val Bedretto, Ticino, Switzerland
  - elevation: about 2,478 m (8,100 ft)
- Mouth: Po
  - location: south-east of Pavia, Italy
  - coordinates: 45°08′38″N 9°14′12″E
- Length: 248 km (154 mi)
- Basin size: 7,228 km^{2} (2,791 sq mi)
- Discharge
  - average: 348 m^{3}/s or 12,300 cu ft/s
  - minimum: 54 m^{3}/s or 1,900 cu ft/s
  - maximum: 5,000 m^{3}/s or 180,000 cu ft/s
- Discharge
  - location: Bellinzona
  - average: 70 m^{3}/s or 2,500 cu ft/s (MQ)
  - minimum: 14.5 m^{3}/s or 510 cu ft/s (1Q)
  - maximum: 906 m^{3}/s or 32,000 cu ft/s (mHQ), 1,500 m^{3}/s or 53,000 cu ft/s (HHQ)

Basin features
- Progression: Po→ Adriatic Sea

The river Ticino (/tɪˈtʃiːnoʊ/ tih-CHEE-noh, Italian: [tiˈtʃiːno]; Lombard: Tesin; French and German: Tessin; Latin: Ticīnus) is the most important perennial left-bank tributary of the Po. It has given its name to the Swiss canton through which its upper portion flows.

It is one of the four major rivers taking their source in the Gotthard region, along with the Rhône, Reuss and Rhine. The river rises in the Val Bedretto in Switzerland at the frontier between the cantons of Valais and Ticino right below the Nufenen Pass, is fed by the glaciers of the Alps and later flows through Lake Maggiore, which traverses the border to Italy. The Ticino joins the Po a few kilometres downstream (along the Ticino) from Pavia. It is about 248 kilometres (154 mi) long. The stretch of river between Lake Maggiore and the confluence with the Po is included in the Parco naturale lombardo della Valle del Ticino, a Nature reserve included by UNESCO in the World Network of Biosphere Reserves.

== Name ==
The name may have meant "the runner," from Proto-Indo-European *tekʷ-ino-s, from *tekʷ- (“to run, flow”).

== Course ==
The Ticino arises from the many torrents that drain the mountain flanks on the eastern side of Nufenen Pass in the upper Val Bedretto. From here, the river flows to the north-east through the Val Bedretto to Airolo (1,127 metres (3,698 ft)) where the south ramp of the St Gotthard Pass and south portals of both the Gotthard Railway Tunnel and the Gotthard Road Tunnel are located. Then it turns slowly to the southeast while entering the Valle Leventina. In the Leventina, the Ticino flows through three terrain steps separated by two narrow gorges (Gola di Monte Piottino and Biaschina) and finally reaches the canton's floor near Bodio at around 320 metres (1,050 feet). Shortly after, at Biasca (286 metres (938 feet)), the river is joined by its first major tributary, the Brenno which flows from Passo del Lucomagno through the Valle di Blenio.

Before the Ticino passes west of the canton's capital, Bellinzona, the river converges with its second larger left tributary, the Moesa, originating below the Passo del San Bernardino and flowing through the Valle Mesolcina. The Valle Mesolcina (and the Val Calanca) belongs geographically and culturally to the Ticino, but politically it is part of the canton of the Grisons. This part of the river valley between Biasca and Bellinzona is called the Riviera. The river is dammed after Bellinzona. Now the Ticino turns almost westwards and flows through the perfectly flat Piano di Magadino, an important cultivation and nature reserve area the river generated itself by its own sediments over ten thousands of years, before it enters the Lago Maggiore at the lowest point of Switzerland at 193 metres (633 ft).

Only about the first sixth of the lake lies in Switzerland. Four major tributaries join the Ticino in Lago Maggiore. The Verzasca and the Maggia enter the lake in Switzerland in Tenero and in Locarno/Ascona, respectively. The Tresa drains the Lago di Lugano and flows in Luino into Lago Maggiore. The Toce drains many valleys to the northwest of Lago Maggiore and joins the lake near Feriolo. It surpasses the Ticino in average discharge volume and contains the highest peak of the catchment area of the Ticino river system, the Grenzgipfel (4,617 metres (15,148 feet)) in the Monte Rosa massif.

In Sesto Calende the river, now called Fiume Ticino, exits Lake Maggiore and meanders southwards, passing the Milan Malpensa Airport in the east. Now slowly turning to the southeast, the river circumvents Milan at a distance of about 20 kilometres (12 mi) in the east. Shortly before it converges with the Po in the south of Milan, it passes Pavia on its northern shore.

== History ==
The legendary Gallic leader Bellovesus was said to have defeated the Etruscans here in circa 600 BC. Ticino was the location of the Battle of Ticinus, the first battle of the Second Punic War fought between the Carthaginian forces of Hannibal and the Romans under Publius Cornelius Scipio in November 218 BC.

In the Middle Ages Pavia (first capital of the Kingdom of the Lombards and then of the kingdom of Italy) was, thanks to the waters of the Ticino, a fundamental hub for communications and trade between Venice and the Po valley. Furthermore, still in Pavia, there was the only brick bridge (ponte Coperto) which until the 19th century crossed the Ticino from Lake Maggiore to the Po.

A wooden bridge was built by the Visconti in Vigevano in the early fourteenth century, but it was set on fire by the Pavia fleet in 1315, rebuilt by Luchino Visconti, it was destroyed again by the Pavia in 1356 and never rebuilt.

The Ticino was in the territory of the Duchy of Milan during much of the later medieval and early modern period, although its upper portion as far as Bellinzona in 1500 and as far as the shores of Lago Maggiore in 1513, fell to the Old Swiss Confederacy as a result of the Swiss campaigns in the Italian Wars.

== Towns and tributaries ==
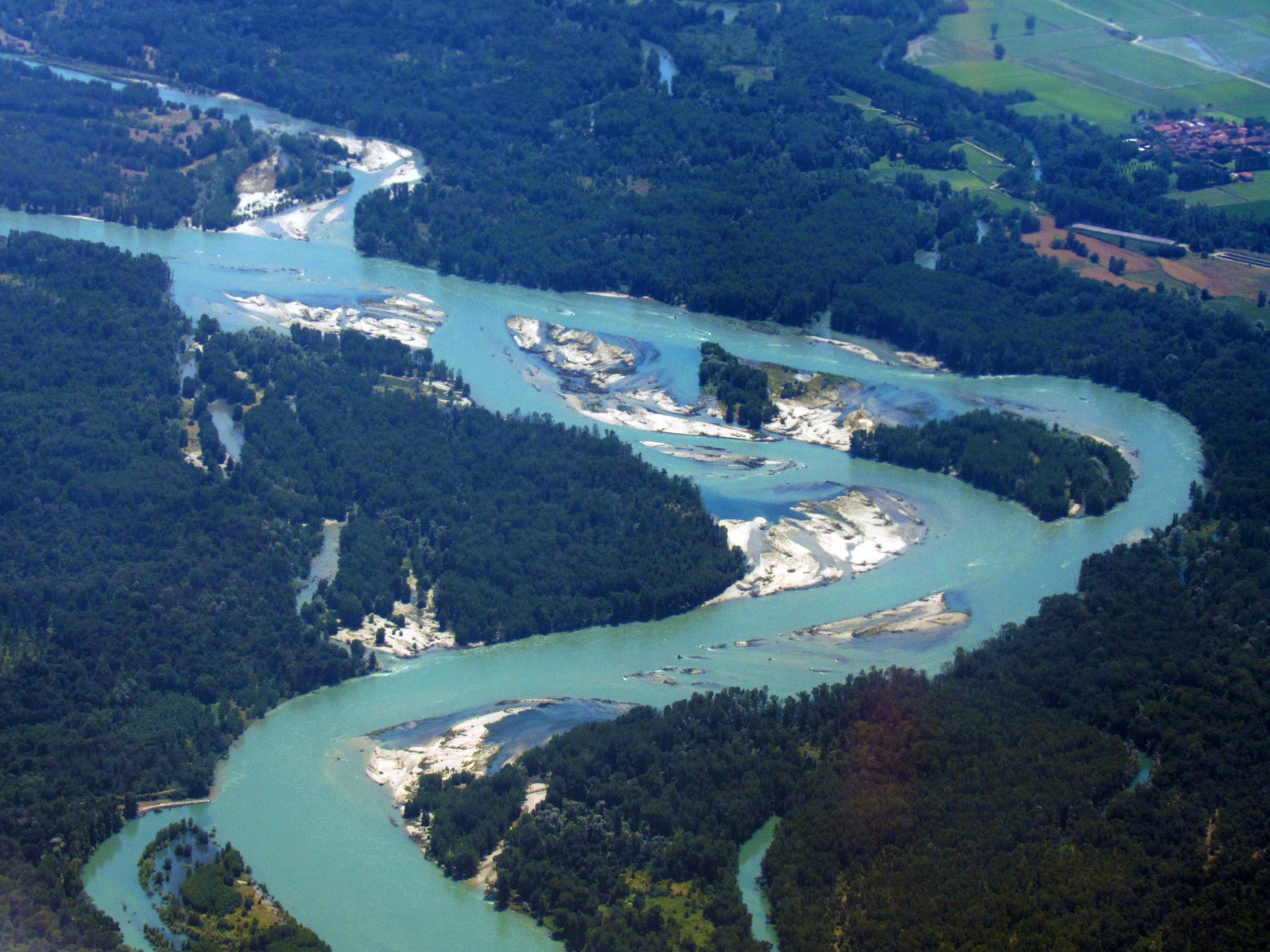
Part of the river Ticino, south of Milan-Malpensa Airport in Italy.

=== Val Bedretto ===
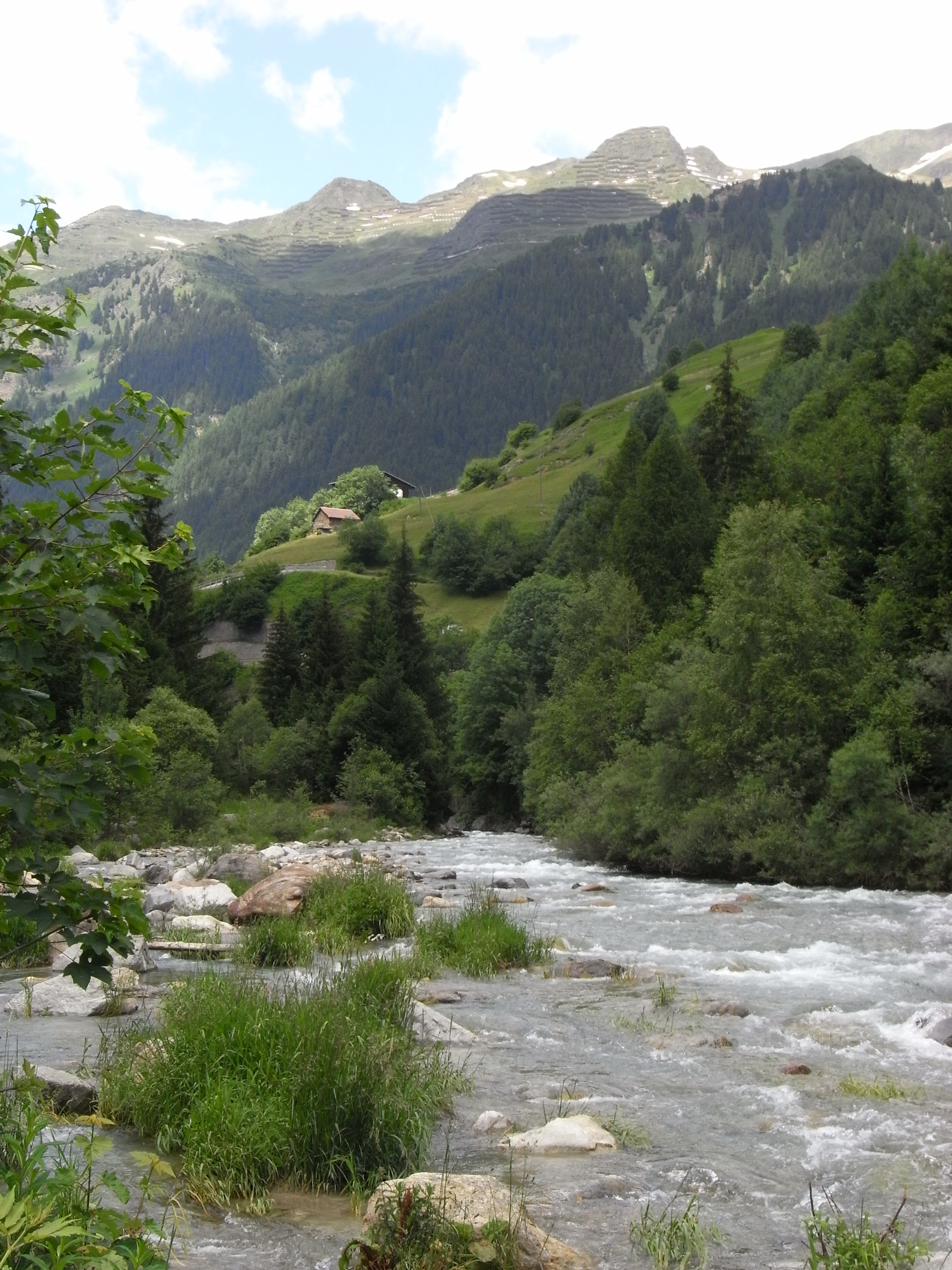
The upper Ticino near Airolo

Val Bedretto, a narrow alpine valley named after the village of Bedretto, culminates in Nufenen Pass, (Italian: Passo della Novena, German: Nufenen Pass), at 2,478 m (8,130 ft) located between Pizzo Gallina (north, 3,060 m (10,040 ft)) and Nufenenstock (south, 2,865 m (9,400 ft)). The road up the valley is fairly straight until it approaches the pass, where the nine hairpin turns start.

The Ticino originates on both sides, north and south, of the Nufenenstock: A smaller tributary originates from a small mountain lake south of the Nufenenstock and north of the Piccolo Corno Gries (2,928 m (9,606 ft)) below the Passo del Corno at 2,484 m (8,150 ft) in the short valley of the same name. Until the beginning of the 20th century the Valaisinne Gries Glacier was still flowing over the Corno Pass into the Val Corno!

Both spring areas converges about where the hairpins of the eastern pass road begins to circumvent about 700 m (2,300 ft) in altitude. Through the passes and over the Nufenenstock runs the border between the cantons of Valais and Ticino.

A paved road constructed in 1964 goes over the Passo della Novena and after some ten hairpins down about 500 m (1,600 ft) in altitude on its western side and then through the Ägenental in the northeastern direction ultimately leading to the Obergoms, the upper half of the valley of the uppermost part the Rhône course. While the lower part of the Valais speaks French, the upper part speaks its particular Highest Alemannic dialect, the Walliser German, the population of Ticino speaks Italian.

Subsequently, the Ticino becomes a mountain brook flowing straight down the valley to the hamlet of All'Acqua or All'Acqua Ospizio at 1,614 m (5,295 ft), named for the hospice for travellers located there near the previous end of a drivable road in former centuries. Currently, it is a base for skiing and hiking. Further down eastwards the small villages of Ronco at 1,476 m (4,843 ft) and finally Bedretto (1,402 m (4,600 ft)) and Villa Bedretto appear. Below Bedretto the Ri di Cristallina, "Cristallina stream", a right tributary from the Val Torta, joins the Ticino at Ossasco, and further down the valley, Fontana is the lowest village in Val Bedretto. The entire area is laced with hiking trails and mountain huts. The valley is subject to avalanches and snow can remain on the ground as late as September.

=== Valle Leventina ===
- Airolo

=== Other ===
- in Switzerland: Bellinzona, Locarno (on Lake Maggiore).
- in Italy: Stresa (on Lake Maggiore), Vigevano, Pavia.

=== Tributaries ===
The Ticino has the following tributaries (R on the right bank, L on the left, looking downstream):

- Brenno (L)
- Moesa (L)
- Verzasca (Lake Maggiore, R)
- Maggia (Lake Maggiore, R)
- Cannobino (Lake Maggiore, R)
- Giona (Lake Maggiore, L)
- Tresa (Lake Maggiore, L)
- Boesio (Lake Maggiore, L)
- San Bernardino (Lake Maggiore, R)
- Toce (Lake Maggiore, R)
- Stronetta (Lake Maggiore, R)
- Bardello (Lake Maggiore, L)
- Arno (L)
- Roggia Vernavola (L)

== See also ==
- List of rivers of Switzerland
