= Grieshorn =

Mountain in Switzerland

- Corno Gries
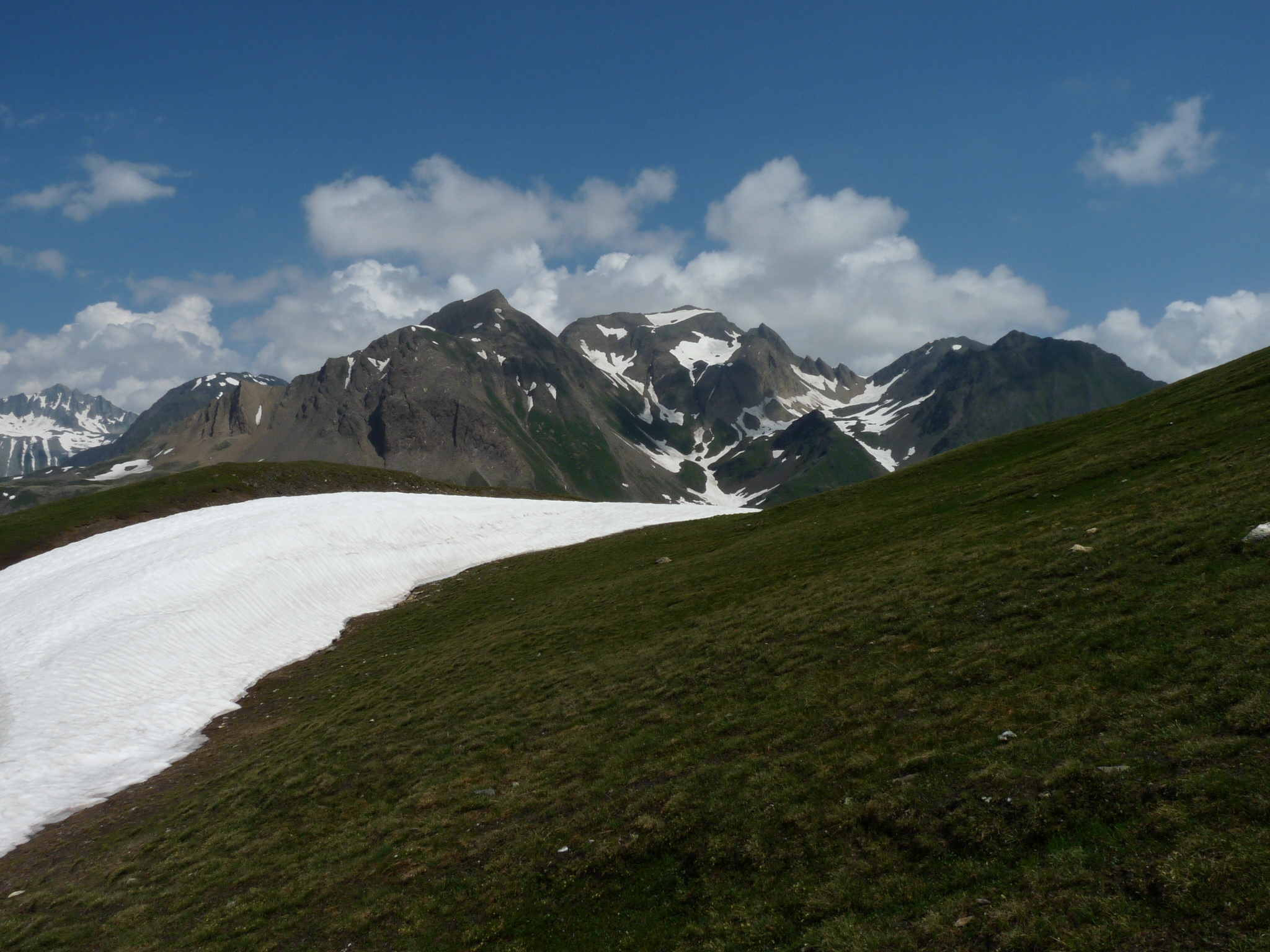
- Corno Gries (centre)

Highest point
- Elevation: 2,969 m (9,741 ft)
- Prominence: 511 m (1,677 ft)
- Parent peak: Blinnenhorn
- Listing: Alpine mountains 2500-2999 m
- Coordinates: 46°27′06″N 8°23′34″E

Geography
- Location within Alps
- Location: Ticino, Switzerland / Piedmont, Italy
- Parent range: Lepontine Alps

The Grieshorn (also known as Corno Gries) is a mountain of the Lepontine Alps, located on the Swiss-Italian border. With an altitude of 2,969 metres above sea level, it is the culminating point of the group lying between the Gries Pass, the San Giacomo Pass and the Nufenen Pass.

On the west lies the slightly lower Klein Grieshorn.
