= Monte Prosa =

Mountain in Switzerland

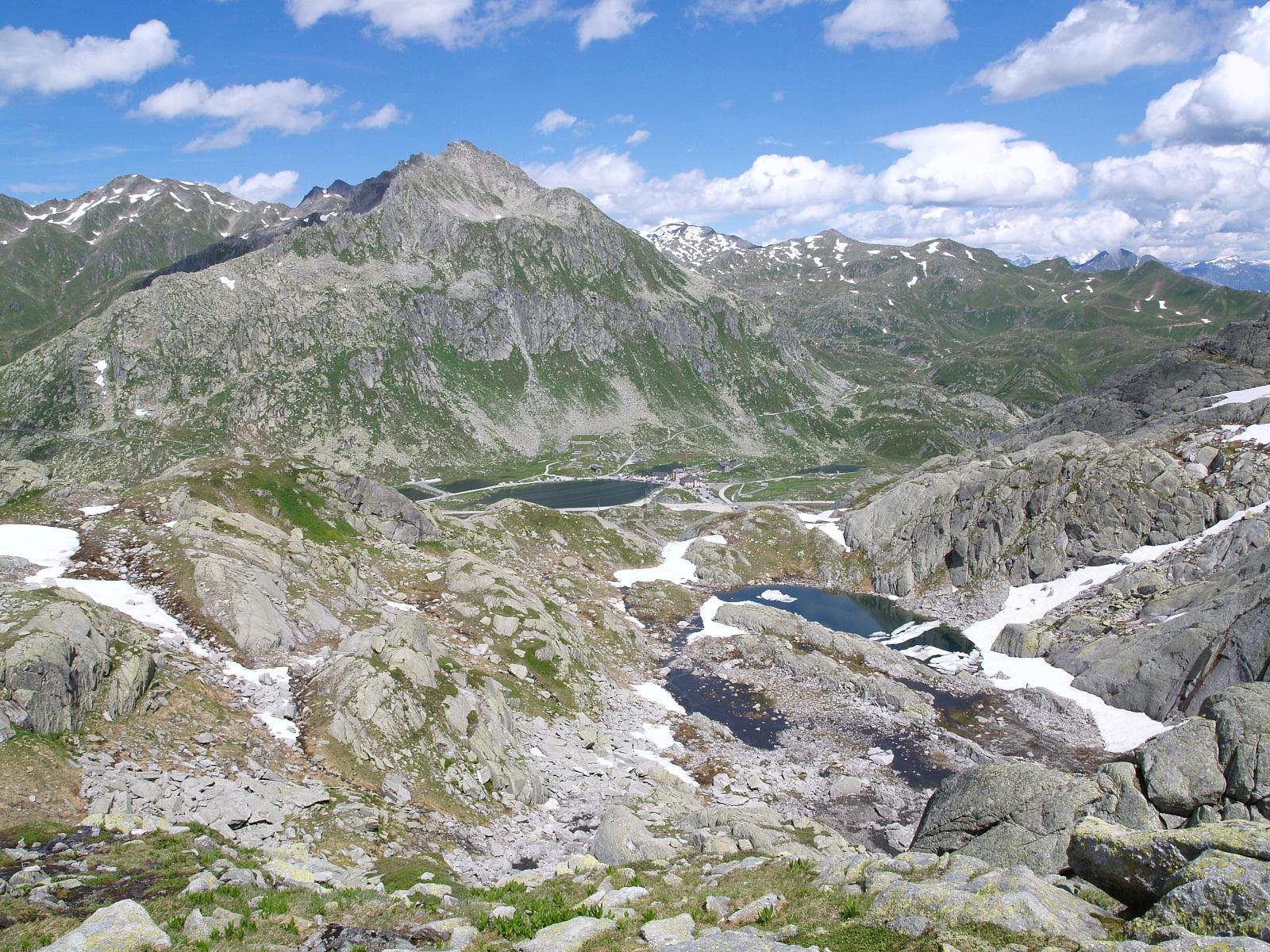
- Monte Prosa in summer, showing the pass to the right of the lake

Highest point
- Elevation: 2,738 m (8,983 ft)
- Listing: Mountains of Switzerland
- Coordinates: 46°33′43″N 8°34′53″E

Geography
- Location within Switzerland
- Location: Ticino, Switzerland
- Parent range: Lepontine Alps

Monte Prosa is a mountain in the Saint-Gotthard Massif, a mountain range in the Lepontine Alps of Switzerland.

The mountain has an elevation of 2,737 m (8,980 ft) above sea level. It is located northeast of the Gotthard Pass in the Airolo municipality of Ticino. It can be climbed over the northeast ridge. The mountain is composed of Lower Triassic Granite from the Rotondo Granite intrusion.

The Gotthard Road Tunnel runs beneath the mountain approximately 1,000 m (3,300 ft) under the Gotthard pass. The Sasso da Pigna fortress, which can be reached from the pass, has been built into Monte Prosa. East of the mountain is the Lago della Sella reservoir.

German poet Friedrich Schiller mentioned both Monte Prosa and nearby Fibbia in his 1804 work Berglied (Song of the Mountain).

== Gallery ==
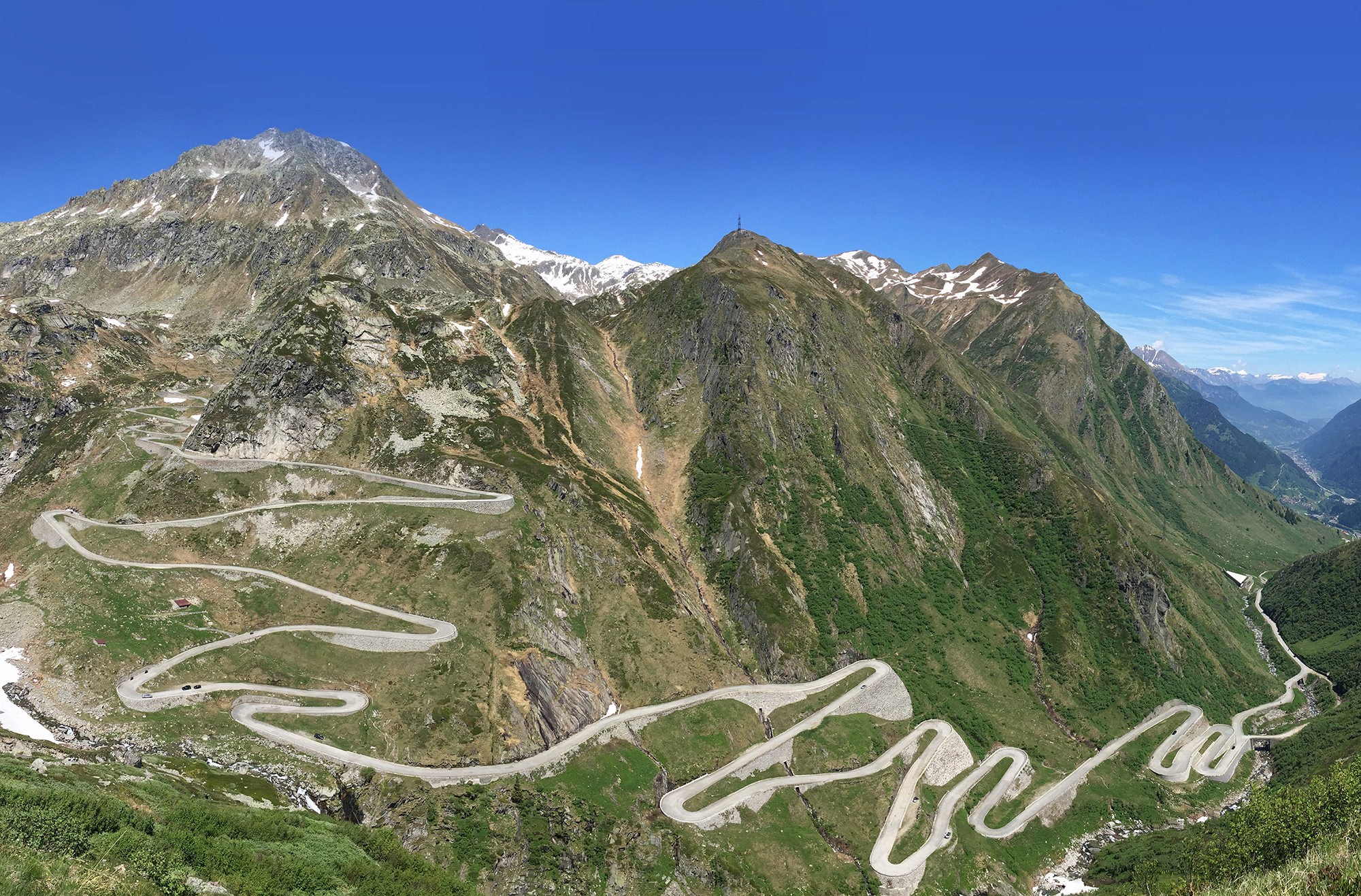
The old road to the Saint Gotthard Pass. Monte Prosa is the peak on the left.

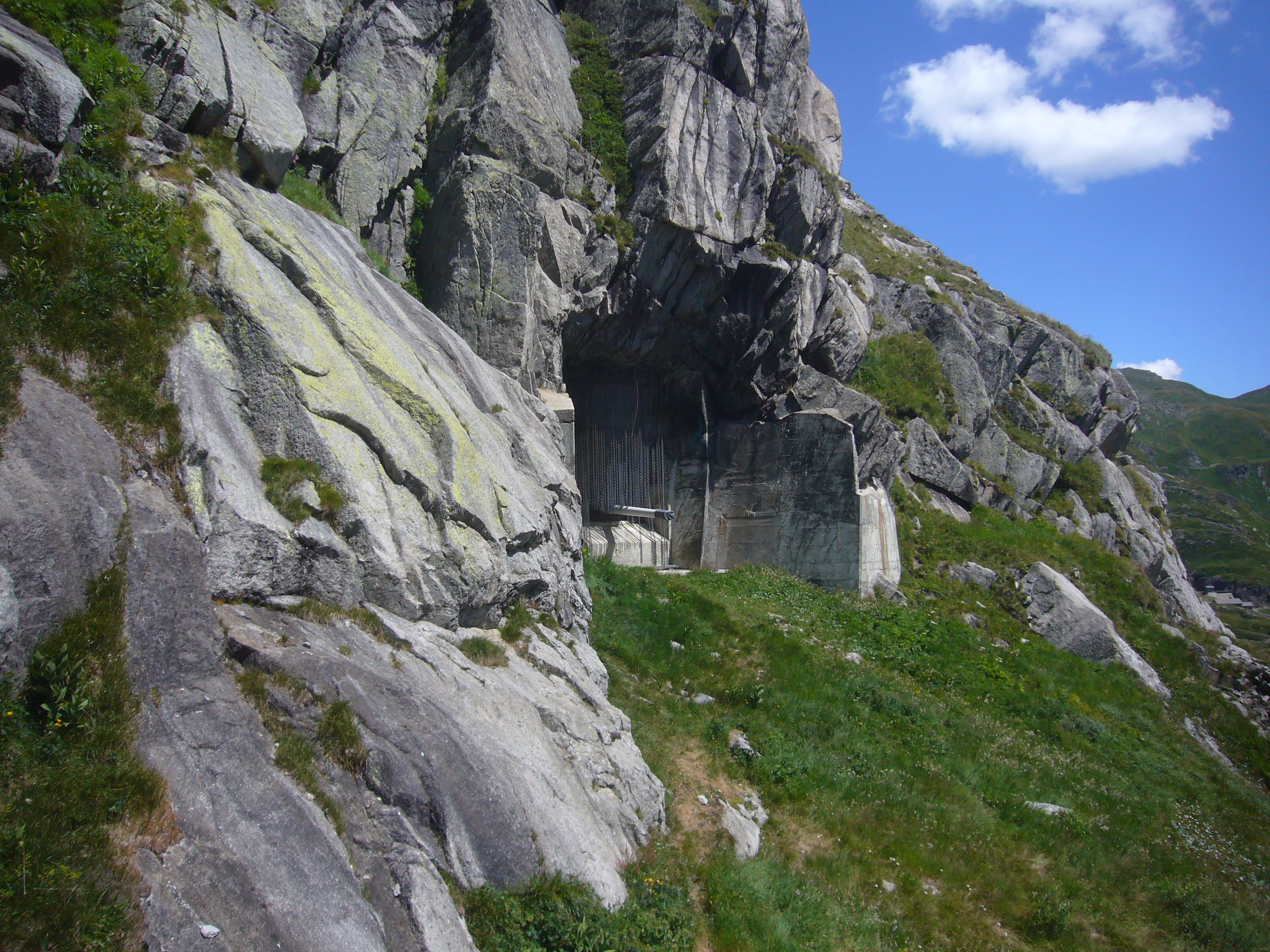
Sasso da Pigna fortress from the public panorama viewpoint to the east cannon.
