= Cristallina Hut =

Swiss mountain hut

Coordinates: 46°28′18.5″N 8°31′35.4″E

The Cristallina Hut (German Cristallinahütte, Italian Capanna Cristallina) is a mountain hut of the Swiss Alpine Club, located in the Lepontine Alps in the Swiss canton of Ticino--specifically, On the west side of the Cristallina mountain.

The original Cristallina Hut was built in 1939, but was almost completely destroyed during an avalanche in 1999, the third avalanche to cause the hut serious damage. It was rebuilt in 2002, 150 meters lower, on the Cristallina Pass, situated between the Bavona valley and the Val Bedretto, at an altitude of 2575 meters. The new hut was designed by Baserga Mozzetti, of Muralto.

From Ossasco (Val Bedretto) the hut is reached in about three and a half hours; from Fusio in six and a half hours. It has 120 beds, divided over 17 rooms. It is open from the end of June to the beginning of October, and occasionally during the winter as well.

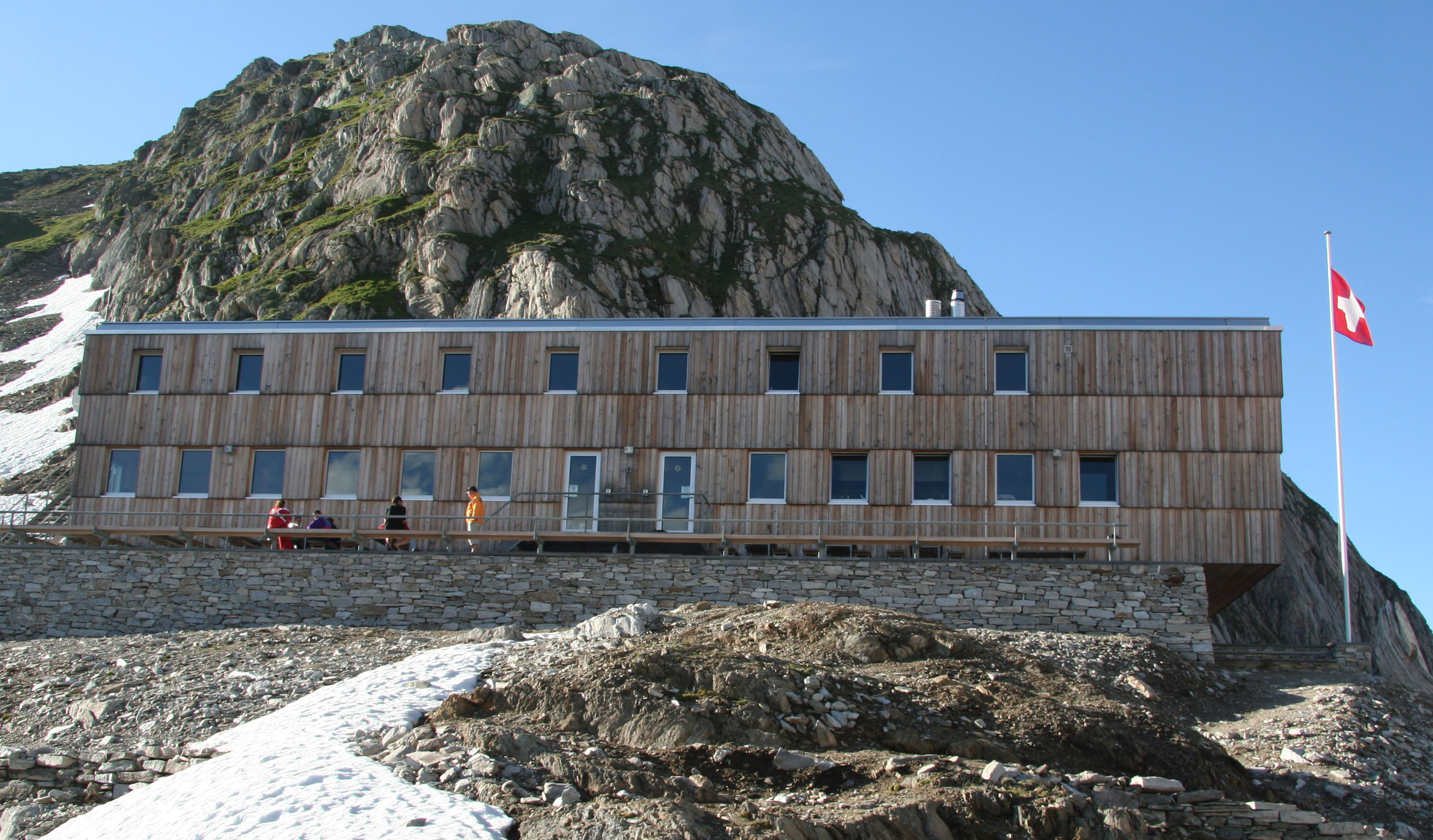

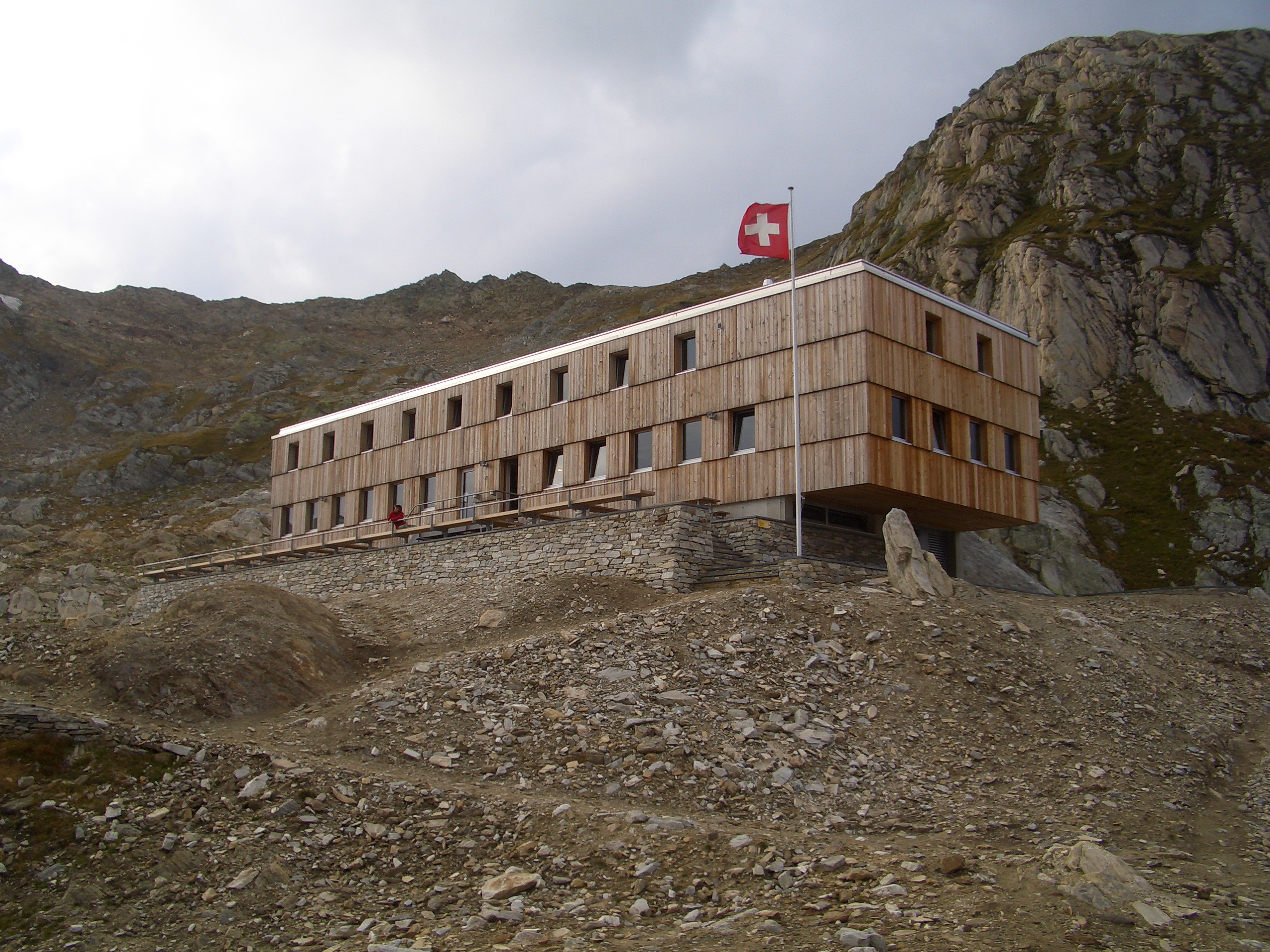

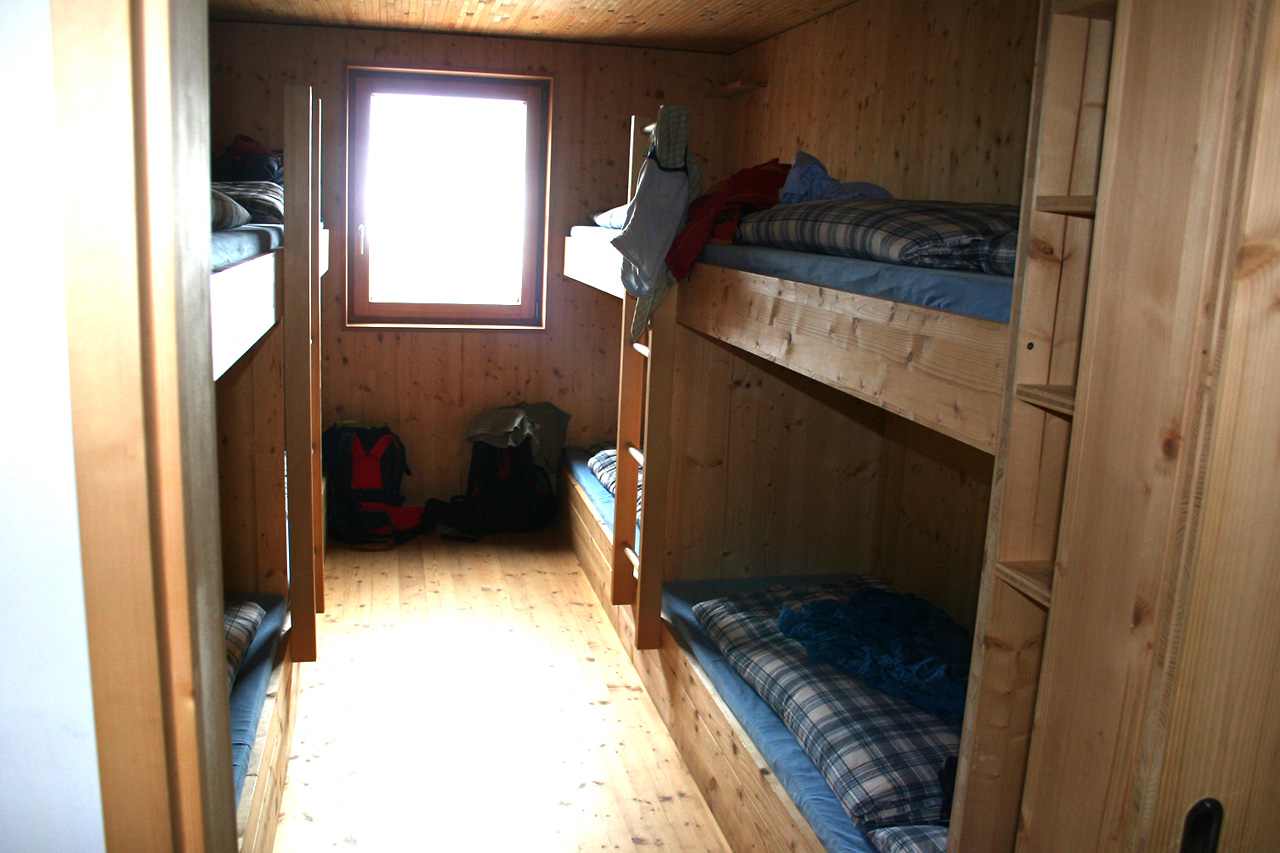
interior
