= San Giacomo Pass =

Mountain pass in Italy and Switzerland

San Giacomo
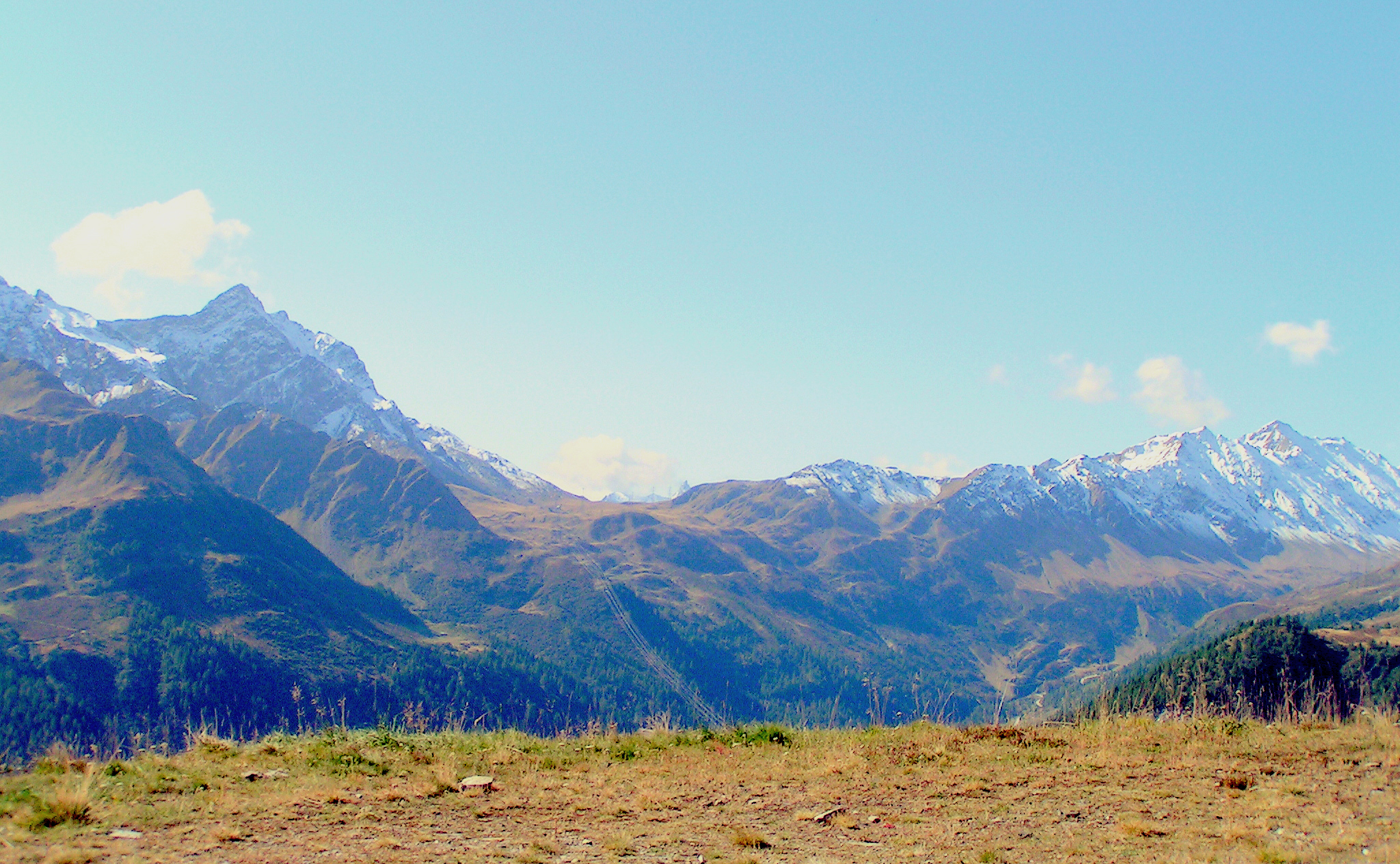
- San Giacomo Pass (center) from the northern side

- Location within Alps
- Elevation: 2,307 metres (7,569 ft)
- Traversed by: Trail

Third Approach
- Location: Piedmont, Italy; Ticino, Switzerland
- Range: Lepontine Alps
- Coordinates: 46°27′33″N 8°27′09″E

The San Giacomo Pass (Italian: Passo San Giacomo) is an Alpine pass connecting Switzerland and Italy. It connects Bedretto on its northern side (valley of Leventina) to Formazza on its southern side.

The pass is located between the Helgenhorn (west) and the Marchhorn (east).

It saw most use in the 14th and 15th century, when muleteers would transport wares over it, and remained in extended use until the opening of the Gotthard railway in 1882.
