= Marchhorn =

Mountain in Switzerland

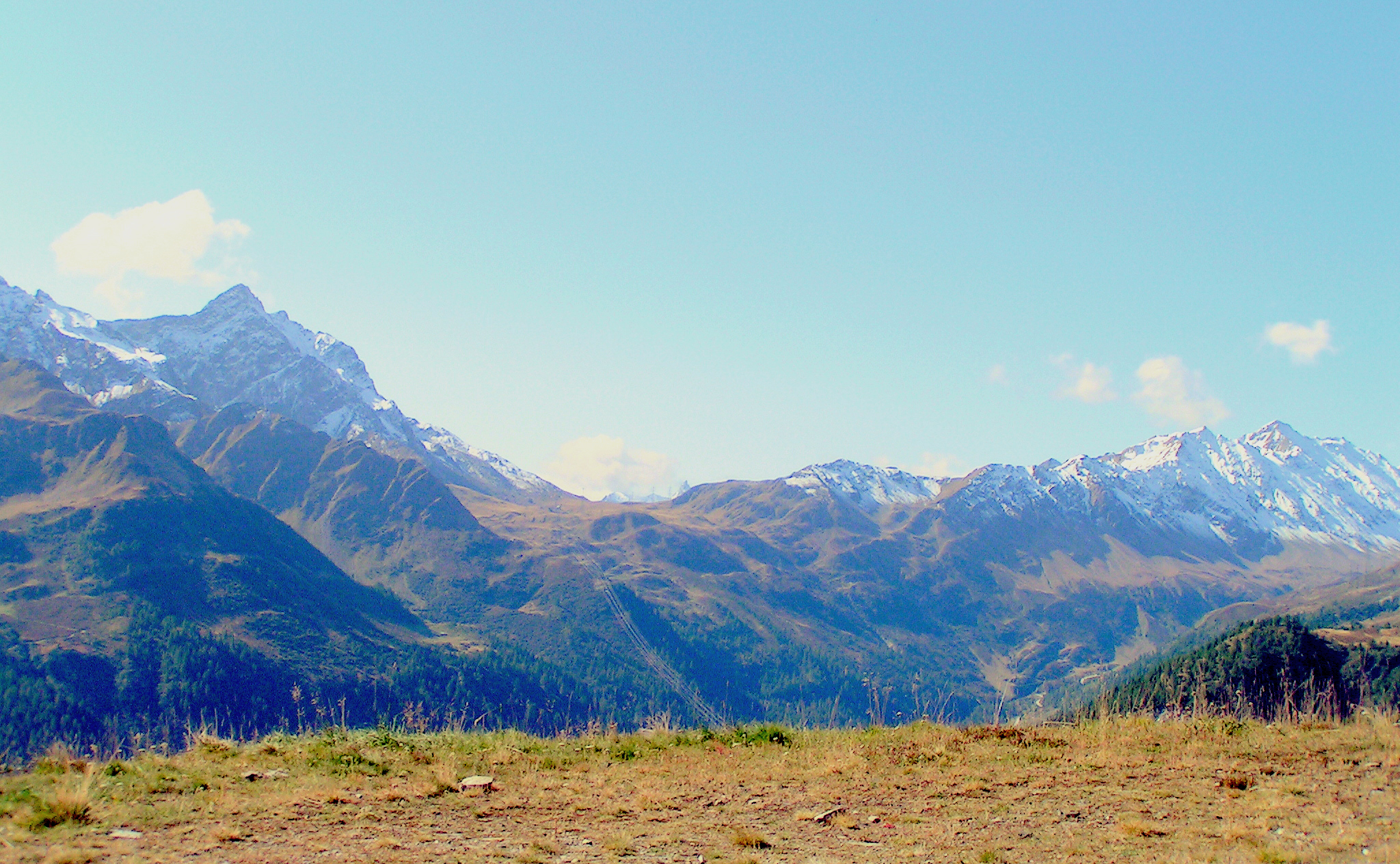
- Marchhorn (left summit) seen from the northern side

Highest point
- Elevation: 2,962 m (9,718 ft)
- Prominence: 327 m (1,073 ft)
- Parent peak: Basòdino
- Coordinates: 46°26′55.8″N 08°27′44.9″E

Geography
- Location within Alps
- Location: Piedmont, Italy; Ticino, Switzerland
- Parent range: Lepontine Alps

The Marchhorn is a mountain of the Lepontine Alps, located on the Swiss-Italian border. On its northwest side it overlooks the San Giacomo Pass.
