= Brenno (river) =

River in Switzerland

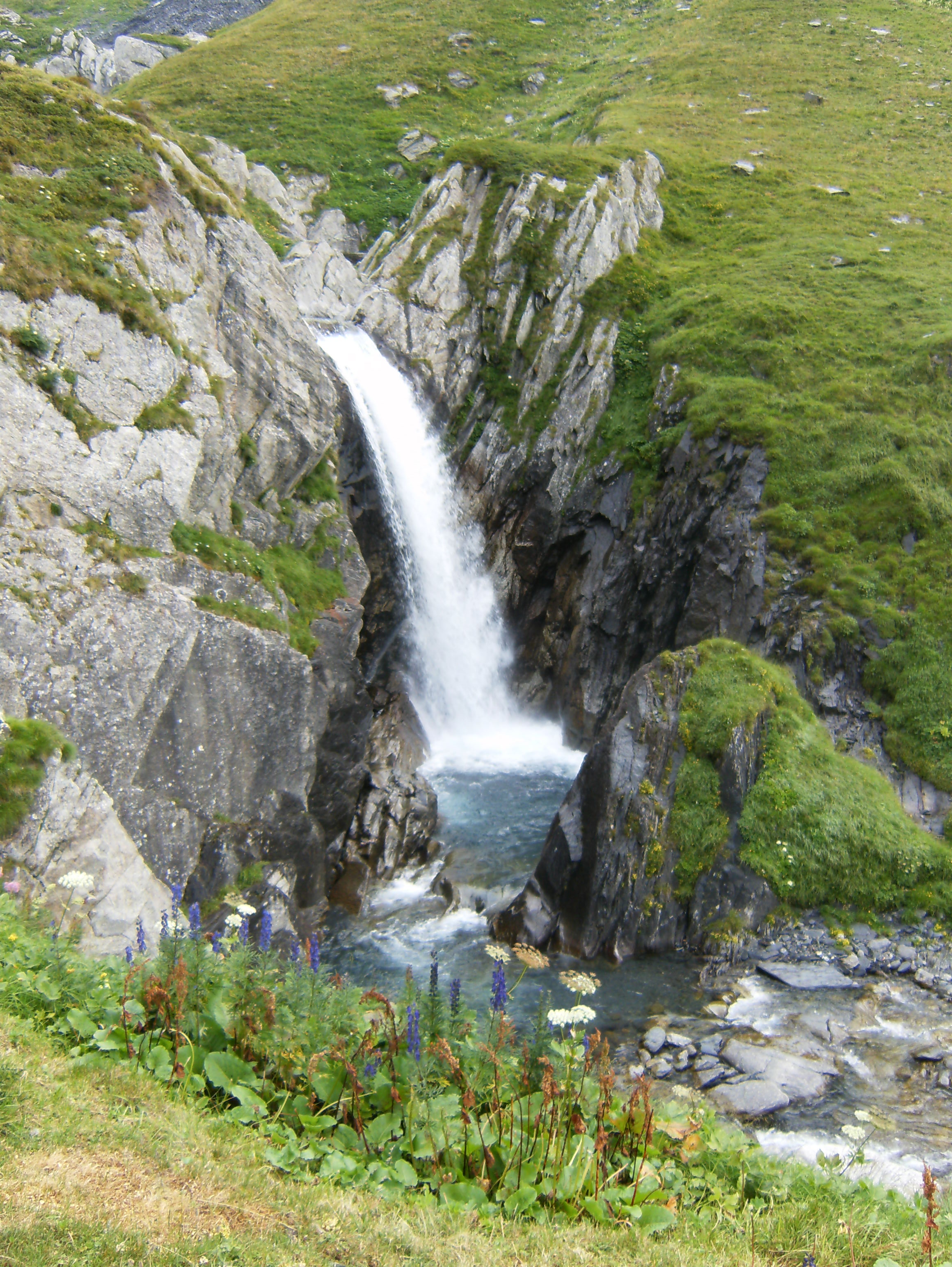
- Brenno (1,900 m)

Location
- Country: Switzerland

Physical characteristics
- Mouth: Ticino
  - location: Biasca
  - coordinates: 46.3565°N 8.9539°E
- Length: 40 km (25 mi)

Basin features
- Progression: Ticino

The Brenno is a 35-kilometre (22 mi) long river in canton Ticino in Switzerland. It drains most of the Blenio Valley and it joins the Ticino between Pollegio and Biasca.
