= San Bernardino (torrent) =

Stream in Northern Italy

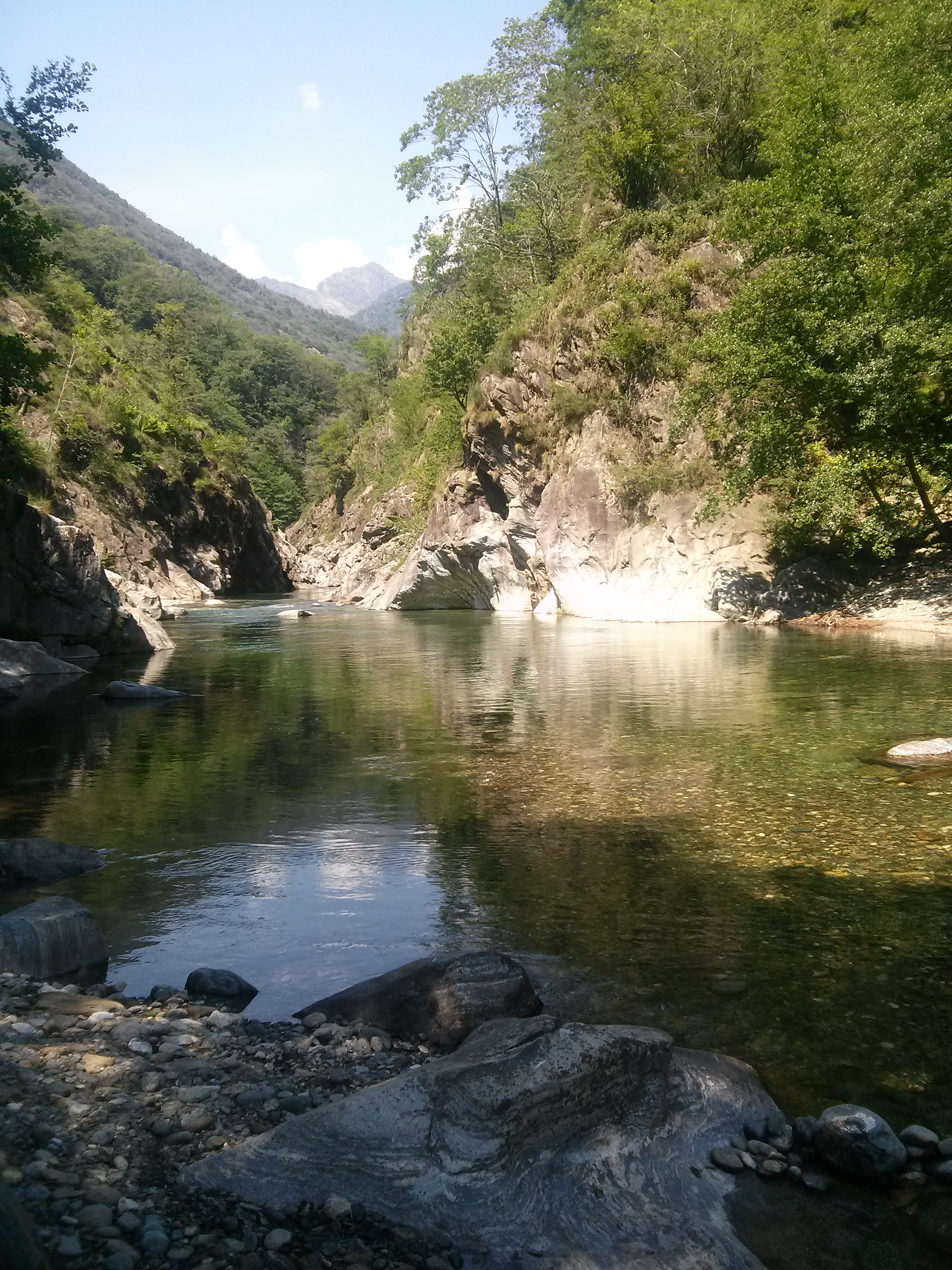
- San Bernardino creek near Rovegro, VB

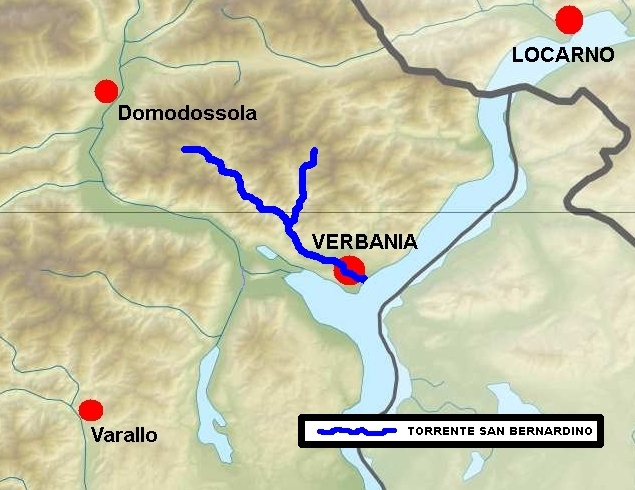
- Location of the stream within NE Piedmont

Location
- Country: Province of Verbano-Cusio-Ossola, Piedmont, Italy

Physical characteristics
- Source
  - location: Val Grande
  - elevation: 2,301 m (7,549 ft)
- Mouth
  - location: Lago Maggiore at Verbania
  - coordinates: 45.9308°N 8.57361°E
  - elevation: 194 m (636 ft)
- Basin size: 132.35 km^{2} (51.10 mi^{2})

Basin features
- Progression: Lake Maggiore→ Ticino→ Po→ Adriatic Sea

The San Bernardino is a torrent which flows through the Italian Province of Verbano-Cusio-Ossola and into Lake Maggiore at Verbania on the Piedmontese (western) shore of the lake.

The origins of its name lie with the Franciscan convent of San Bernardino which was established in 1483 near the mouth of the river, between Intra and Pallanza. The buildings are no longer extant.

== Course ==
The torrent is formed by the confluence of two smaller streams, the Rio Valgrande and the Rio Pogallo, at Ponte Casletto in Val Grande. Its drainage basin comprises the areas of Val Grande and Val Pogallo; its course and its tributaries are characterised by deep ravines and gorges.

The San Bernardino passes through the communes of San Bernardino Verbano (which takes its name from the river), Cossogno and finally Verbania, where it separates the population centres of Pallanza and Intra and falls into Lake Maggiore.

== Industrial exploitation ==
Until the early 1900s the Val Grande and Val Pogallo were an important source of timber and the river was used to transport the trees felled by means of log rolling.

The San Bernardino provided a source of hydropower for the factories which were built along its course and its water was employed in the bleaching processes of the adjacent textile factories. In 1892 Carlo Sutermeister, an industrialist of Swiss origin, constructed the first Italian hydroelectric power station capable of distributing electrical power; it supplied the inhabitants of Intra, Pallanza and other places in the area as well as the factories nearby. Subsequently the power plant of Rovegro was built and today there are three power stations in use on the river.

== Recreational uses ==
Kayaking can be enjoyed in certain tracts of this Alpine torrent and, despite the chilly water, swimming is a popular pastime, especially at the locality Santino. Fishing is allowed, although only for brown trout (Salmo trutta), and only outside the protected reserves which form part of the national park.

== Notes ==
This article originated as a translation of this version of its counterpart in the Italian Wikipedia.
