= Nufenenstock =

Mountain in Switzerland

- Location within Switzerland

Highest point
- Elevation: 2,866 m (9,403 ft)
- Prominence: 381 m (1,250 ft)
- Parent peak: Grieshorn
- Listing: Alpine mountains 2500-2999 m
- Coordinates: 46°28′02″N 8°23′18.5″E

Geography
- Location: Valais/Ticino, Switzerland
- Parent range: Lepontine Alps

The Nufenestock (2,866 m) is a mountain of the Lepontine Alps, located on the border between the Swiss cantons of Valais and Ticino. It lies between the Nufenen Pass and the Passo del Corno. On its south-west side it overlooks the lake of Gries.
