= Bedretto =

- Municipality
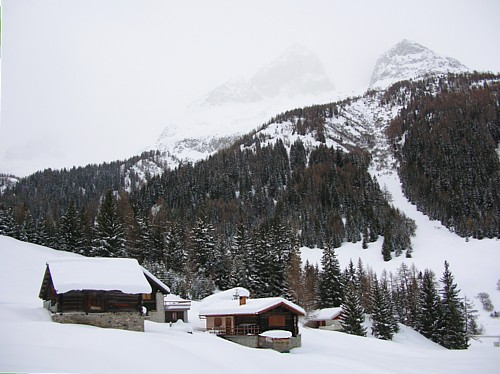

- Flag Coat of arms
- Location of Bedretto
- Location within Switzerland Location within Canton of Ticino
- Coordinates: 46°30′N 8°31′E
- Country: Switzerland
- Canton: Ticino
- District: Leventina

Government
  - Mayor: Sindaco

Area
  - Total: 75.2 km^{2} (29.0 sq mi)
- Elevation: 1,402 m (4,600 ft)

Population (December 2004)
  - Total: 70
  - Density: 0.93/km^{2} (2.4/sq mi)
- Time zone: UTC+01:00 (CET)
  - Summer (DST): UTC+02:00 (CEST)
- Postal code: 6781
- SFOS number: 5063
- ISO 3166 code: CH-TI
- Surrounded by: Airolo, Cevio, Formazza (IT-VB), Lavizzara, Oberwald (VS), Realp (UR), Ulrichen (VS)
- Website: https://www.bedretto.ch SFSO statistics

Bedretto (Lombard: Bidré) is a municipality and a village in the Val Bedretto, the upper most part of the river Ticino. It belongs to the district of Leventina in the canton of Ticino in Switzerland.

== History ==
In 1906, pre-Roman graves and a Roman era villa and coins were discovered in Bedretto. The presumption, that it was originally part of Airolo, could not be confirmed by any available records. Bedretto is first mentioned in 1210 as Bedoledo and at that time it was a separate municipality. Already in 1227, when the alpine pastures of Leventina valley were divided among the communities, Bedretto had dependent, surrounding farms and hamlets. Bedretto was the only community that was not given any alpine pastures.

In 1227, Bedretto is also mentioned as a separate parish. The parish church of SS Martiri Maccabei in the settlement of Villa was rebuilt after its destruction by an avalanche in 1594. The existing building dates from the 19th Century.

The hospice in All'Acqua was the starting point to two famous mountain crossings: the Nufenen Pass, which leads to Ulrichen in the Upper Valais, and the Passo di San Giacomo, which leads to the Italian Formazza valley. The Hospice of Valdolgia or St. Nicholas on the Passo di San Giacomo was a second station in the old mule track. Due to the steep slopes of Bedretto Valley, avalanches often hit the villages. The avalanche in 1863, destroyed half the village and killed 29 people, and the one in 1749 killed 13. In winter, the valley is often cut off and the connection of villages to each other and with Airolo may be interrupted for days. With the construction of avalanche barriers, the situation has improved. The road between Airolo and Bedretto opened in 1924, was extended in 1932 to Ronco then in 1964 extended beyond Nufenen. The valley is also today still fairly isolated and without a constant connection with Valais, since a rail project to connect the valley to the Furka Oberalp Bahn as part of the Furka Base Tunnel project failed. Historically, the scarce resources of the valley (cattle, dairy farming and cultivation of potatoes and rye) were insufficient to feed all of the inhabitants. So they were forced to seasonal migrate abroad (mainly in Italy and France) seeking work as chestnut roasters, waitresses or domestic servants. Since the seasonal migration ceased at the end of World War II, the valley has depopulated more rapidly. The decline of the permanent resident population is offset in the summer months by the return of locals and offset in the winter by the influx of tourists and holiday guests.

== Geography ==
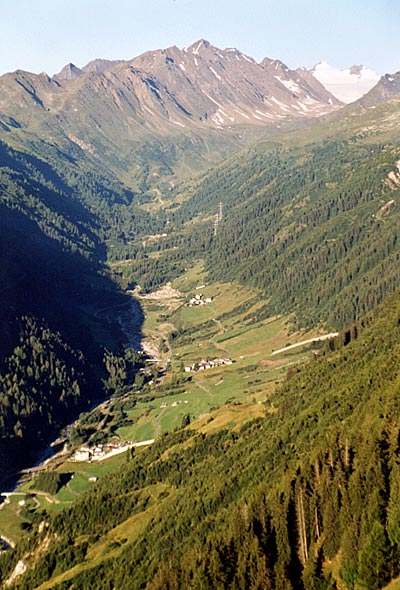
Val Bedretto. In the middle is Bedretto, further up, Ronco and almost hidden is All'Acqua. Nufenen Pass is at the head of the valley. The large range in the background is the Cristallina Massif.

Aerial view by Walter Mittelholzer (1931)

Bedretto is located in the Bedretto Valley running from the Nufenen Pass via the headwaters of the Ticino river down to Airolo. The municipality consists of the village of Bedretto and the hamlets of Ronco, Villa (site of the municipal administration) and Ossasco, and forms part of the Leventina district.

The municipality has an area, as of 1997, of 75.23 square kilometers (29.05 sq mi). Of this area, 1.5 km^{2} (0.58 sq mi) or 2.0% is used for agricultural purposes, while 8.75 km^{2} (3.38 sq mi) or 11.6% is forested. Of the rest of the land, 0.67 km^{2} (0.26 sq mi) or 0.9% is settled (buildings or roads), 0.69 km^{2} (0.27 sq mi) or 0.9% is either rivers or lakes and 42.06 km^{2} (16.24 sq mi) or 55.9% is unproductive land.

Of the built up area, housing and buildings made up 0.2% and transportation infrastructure made up 0.5%. Out of the forested land, 5.8% of the total land area is heavily forested and 2.3% is covered with orchards or small clusters of trees. Of the agricultural land, 1.8% is used for growing crops. All the water in the municipality is flowing water. Of the unproductive areas, 19.1% is unproductive vegetation and 36.8% is too rocky for vegetation.

== Coat of arms ==
The blazon of the municipal coat of arms is Per pale Vert and Argent two larch trees issuant from the base counterchanged.

== Demographics ==
Bedretto has a population (as of December 2020) of 102. As of 2008, 12.2% of the population are foreign nationals. Over the last 10 years (1997–2007) the population has changed at a rate of 7.8%.

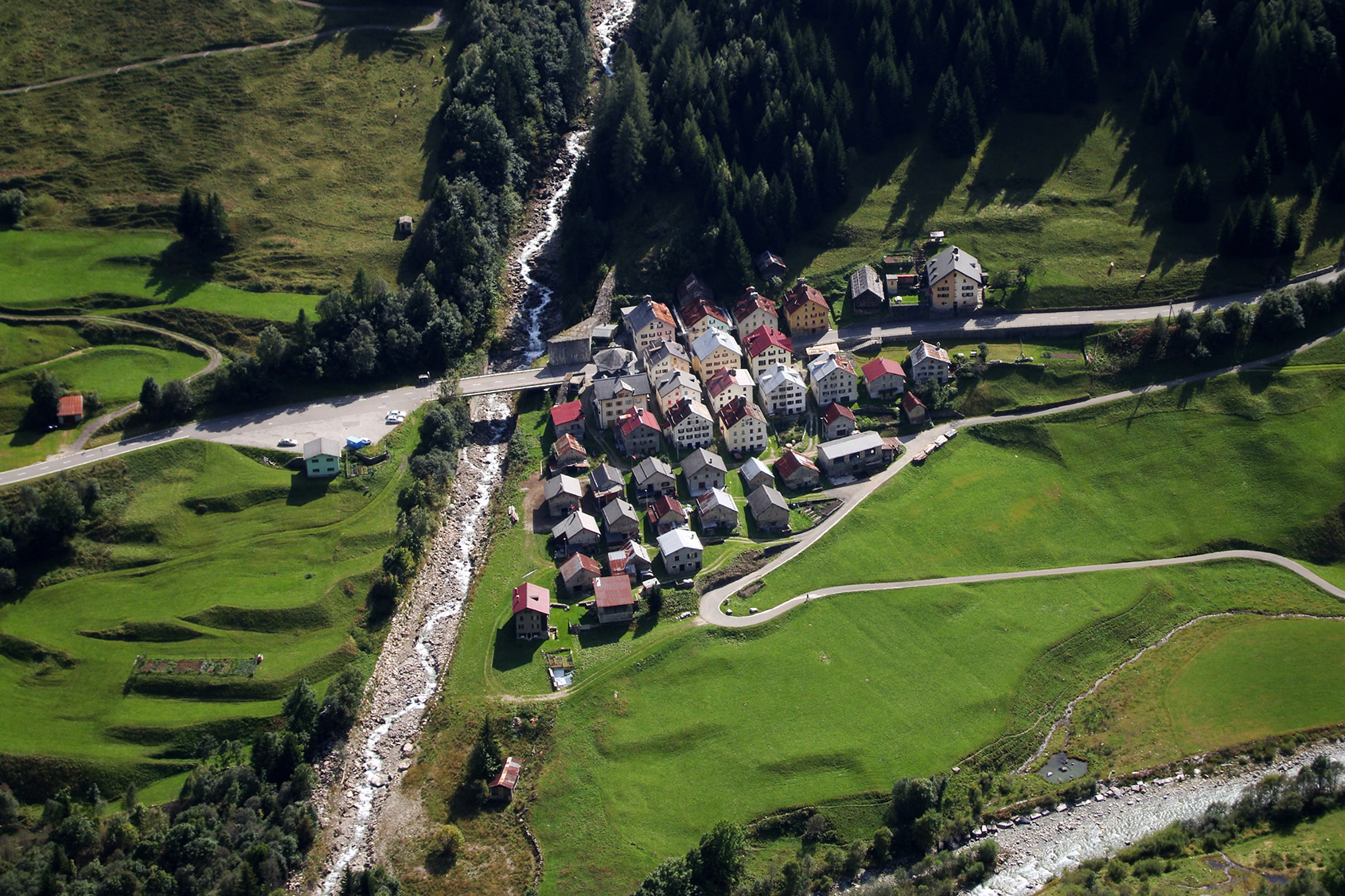
Fontana hamlet

Most of the population (as of 2000) speaks Italian (91.7%), with German being second most common ( 4.2%) and French being third ( 4.2%). Of the Swiss national languages (as of 2000), 3 speak German, 3 people speak French, 66 people speak Italian. The remainder ( people) speak another language.

As of 2008, the gender distribution of the population was 52.2% male and 47.8% female. The population was made up of 26 Swiss men (38.8% of the population), and 9 (13.4%) non-Swiss men. There were 30 Swiss women (44.8%), and 2 (3.0%) non-Swiss women.

In 2008, there were 2 live births to Swiss citizens and there were 3 deaths of Swiss citizens. Ignoring immigration and emigration, the population of Swiss citizens decreased by 1 while the foreign population remained the same. There was 1 Swiss woman who immigrated back to Switzerland. At the same time, there was 1 non-Swiss man who emigrated from Switzerland to another country. The total Swiss population change in 2008 (from all sources) was a decrease of 8 and the non-Swiss population change was a decrease of 1 people. This represents a population growth rate of -10.8%.

The age distribution, as of 2009, in Bedretto is; 4 children or 6.0% of the population are between 0 and 9 years old and 1 teenager is between 10 and 19. Of the adult population, 5 people or 7.5% of the population are between 20 and 29 years old. 8 people or 11.9% are between 30 and 39, 11 people or 16.4% are between 40 and 49, and 8 people or 11.9% are between 50 and 59. The senior population distribution is 6 people or 9.0% of the population are between 60 and 69 years old, 9 people or 13.4% are between 70 and 79, there are 15 people or 22.4% who are over 80.

As of 2000, there were 37 private households in the municipality, and an average of 1.9 persons per household. In 2000 there were 126 single family homes (or 89.4% of the total) out of a total of 141 inhabited buildings. There were 8 two family buildings (5.7%) and 1 multi-family building (0.7%). There were also 6 buildings in the municipality that were multipurpose buildings (used for both housing and commercial or another purpose).

The vacancy rate for the municipality, in 2008, was 0%. In 2000 there were 152 apartments in the municipality. The most common apartment size was the 5 room apartment of which there were 48. There were 7 single room apartments and 48 apartments with five or more rooms. Of these apartments, a total of 37 apartments (24.3% of the total) were permanently occupied, while 115 apartments (75.7%) were seasonally occupied and apartments (0.0%) were empty.

As of 2007, the construction rate of new housing units was 0 new units per 1000 residents.

The historical population is given in the following table:

year	population
1567	38 Hearths
1745	293
1798	594
1850	388
1900	257
1930	275
1950	213
1960	148
1970	117
1980	77
1990	50
2000	72

== Sights ==
The entire villages of Bedretto and Villa are designated as part of the Inventory of Swiss Heritage Sites.

== Politics ==
In the 2007 federal election, the most popular party was the CVP which received 50.28% of the vote. The next three most popular parties were the FDP (19.72%), the Ticino League (13.33%) and the SVP (8.33%). In the federal election, a total of 47 votes were cast, and the voter turnout was 57.3%.

In the 2007 Gran Consiglio election, there were a total of 83 registered voters in Bedretto, of which 58 or 69.9% voted. 1 blank ballot was cast, leaving 57 valid ballots in the election. The most popular party was the PPD+GenGiova which received 25 or 43.9% of the vote. The next three most popular parties were; the SSI (with 13 or 22.8%), the PLRT (with 6 or 10.5%) and the LEGA (with 5 or 8.8%).

In the 2007 Consiglio di Stato election, 1 blank ballot was cast, leaving 57 valid ballots in the election. The most popular party was the PPD which received 29 or 50.9% of the vote. The next three most popular parties were; the SSI (with 10 or 17.5%), the PLRT (with 7 or 12.3%) and the PLRT (with 7 or 12.3%).

== Economy ==
As of 2007, Bedretto had an unemployment rate of 0.78%. As of 2005, there were 5 people employed in the primary economic sector and about 1 business involved in this sector. 10 people were employed in the secondary sector and there were 2 businesses in this sector. 12 people were employed in the tertiary sector, with 4 businesses in this sector. There were 31 residents of the municipality who were employed in some capacity, of which females made up 54.8% of the workforce.

In 2000, there were 4 workers who commuted into the municipality and 16 workers who commuted away. The municipality is a net exporter of workers, with about 4.0 workers leaving the municipality for every one entering. Of the working population, 3.2% used public transportation to get to work, and 38.7% used a private car.

As of 2009, there were 3 hotels in Bedretto with a total of 19 rooms and 45 beds.

== Religion ==
From the 2000 census, 65 or 90.3% were Roman Catholic, while 2 or 2.8% belonged to the Swiss Reformed Church. There are 2 individuals (or about 2.78% of the population) who belong to another church (not listed on the census), and 3 individuals (or about 4.17% of the population) did not answer the question.

== Education ==
In Bedretto about 61.3% of the population (between age 25–64) have completed either non-mandatory upper secondary education or additional higher education (either university or a Fachhochschule).

In Bedretto there were a total of 3 students (as of 2009). The Ticino education system provides up to three years of non-mandatory kindergarten and in Bedretto there were 0 children in kindergarten. The primary school program lasts for five years and includes both a standard school and a special school. In the municipality, students attended the standard primary schools and 0 students attended the special school. In the lower secondary school system, students either attend a two-year middle school followed by a two-year pre-apprenticeship or they attend a four-year program to prepare for higher education. There were 0 students in the two-year middle school and 0 in their pre-apprenticeship, while 1 students were in the four-year advanced program.

The upper secondary school includes several options, but at the end of the upper secondary program, a student should be prepared to enter a trade or to continue to a university or college. In Ticino, vocational students may either attend school while working on their internship or apprenticeship (which takes three or four years) or may attend school followed by an internship or apprenticeship (which takes one year as a full-time student or one and a half to two years as a part-time student).

There were 0 vocational students who were attending school full-time and 2 who attend part-time.

As of 2000, there were 7 students from Bedretto who attended schools outside the municipality.

== Famous people ==
- Raffaele Forni, bishop and nuncio

== See also ==
- Bedretto Underground Laboratory for Geoenergies
- Rotondo Granite
