= Nufenen Pass =

Mountain pass in Switzerland

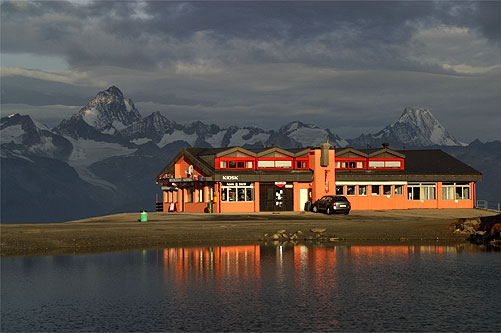
- View from the pass towards the Bernese Alps with the Finsteraarhorn (left) and Lauteraarhorn (right)

- Location within Switzerland Location within Canton of Ticino Location within Canton of Valais
- Elevation: 2,478 metres (8,130 ft)
- Traversed by: Road

Third Approach
- Location: Ticino/Valais, Switzerland
- Range: Alps
- Coordinates: 46°28′41″N 08°23′35″E

Nufenen Pass (Italian: Passo della Novena, German: Nufenenpass) is the second highest mountain pass, after Umbrail Pass, with a paved road in Switzerland, at an elevation of 2,478 metres. It lies between the summits of Pizzo Gallina (north) and the Nufenenstock (south). The road opened to motor vehicle traffic in September 1969.

== Route ==
The pass road from Ulrichen in the canton of Valais leads to the Bedretto valley in the canton of Ticino, linking Brig to Airolo. It is not the lowest pass between the two valleys, as there is another unnamed pass one kilometre to the south, elevation 2,440 metres, which is traversed by a trail.

The source of the river Ticino lies east of the top of the pass. Towards the north are views of the Bernese Alps, including the Finsteraarhorn while there is a view over the Gries Glacier to the south.

== Gallery ==
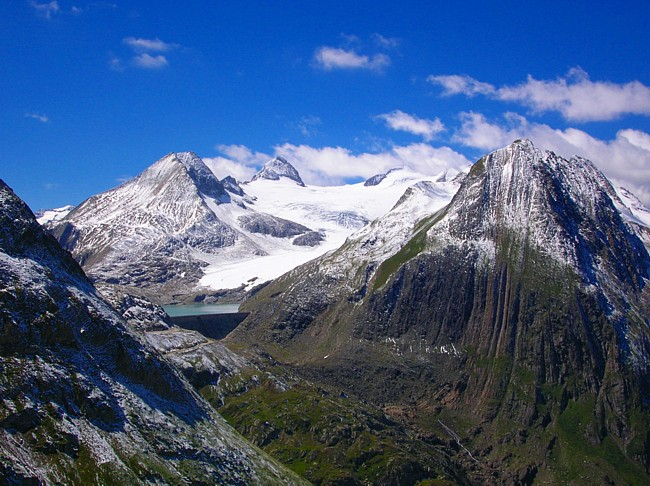
View of Griesgletscher from the pass

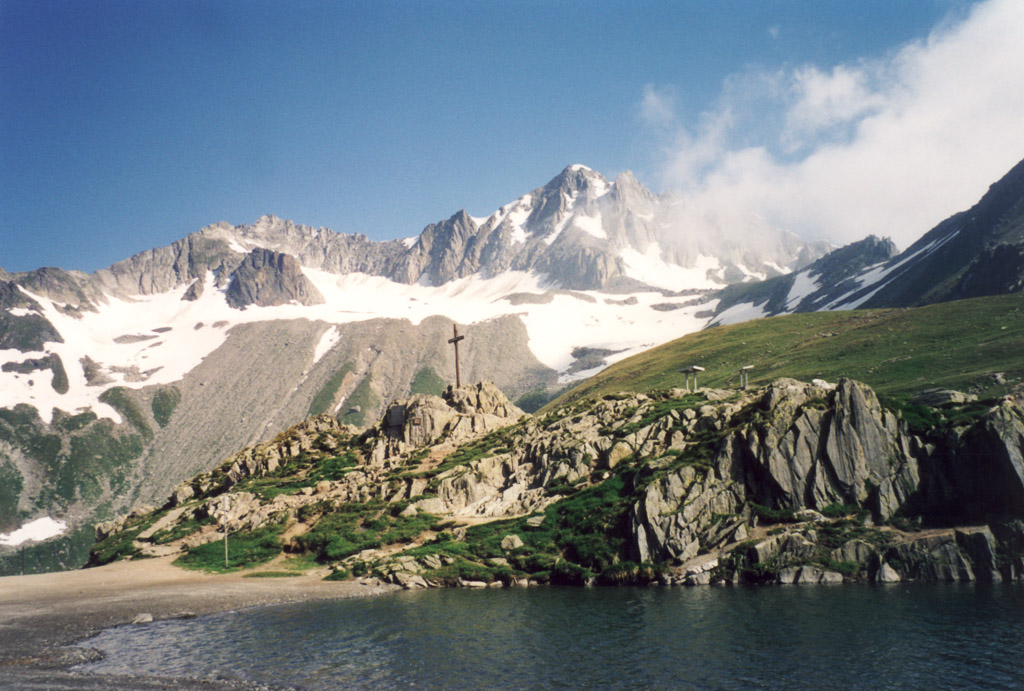
Another view from the pass

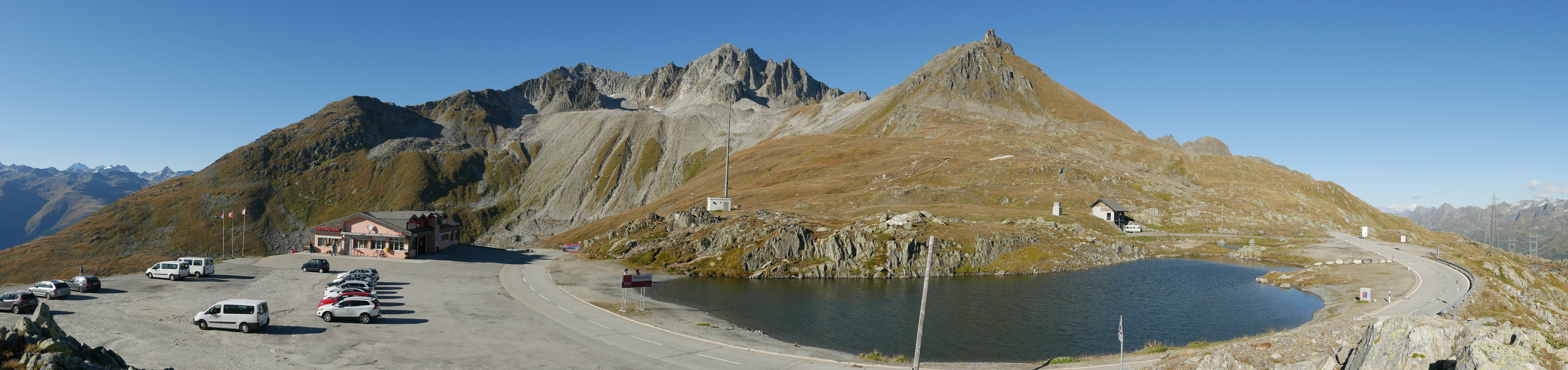
Nufenen Pass

== See also ==
- List of highest paved roads in Europe
- List of mountain passes

== Bibliography ==
- Nicola Pfund, Sui passi in bicicletta - Swiss Alpine passes by bicycle, Fontana Edizioni, 2012, p. 54-61. ISBN 978-88-8191-281-0

== Sources and further reading ==
- This article incorporates information from the equivalent article in the German Wikipedia, consulted during April 2009.
