= Cristallina =

Mountain in Switzerland

Highest point
- Elevation: 2,912 m (9,554 ft)
- Prominence: 344 m (1,129 ft)
- Parent peak: Basòdino
- Listing: Alpine mountains 2500-2999 m
- Coordinates: 46°27′53″N 8°32′13″E

Geography
- Location within Switzerland Location within Canton of Ticino
- Location: Ticino, Switzerland
- Parent range: Lepontine Alps

The Cristallina is a mountain of the Lepontine Alps, located in the Swiss canton of Ticino. It is situated between the valleys of Leventina, Val Bavona and Valle di Peccia (the latter two belonging to the Valle Maggia. On the west side of the mountain is located the Passo Cristallina with the Cristallina Hut.

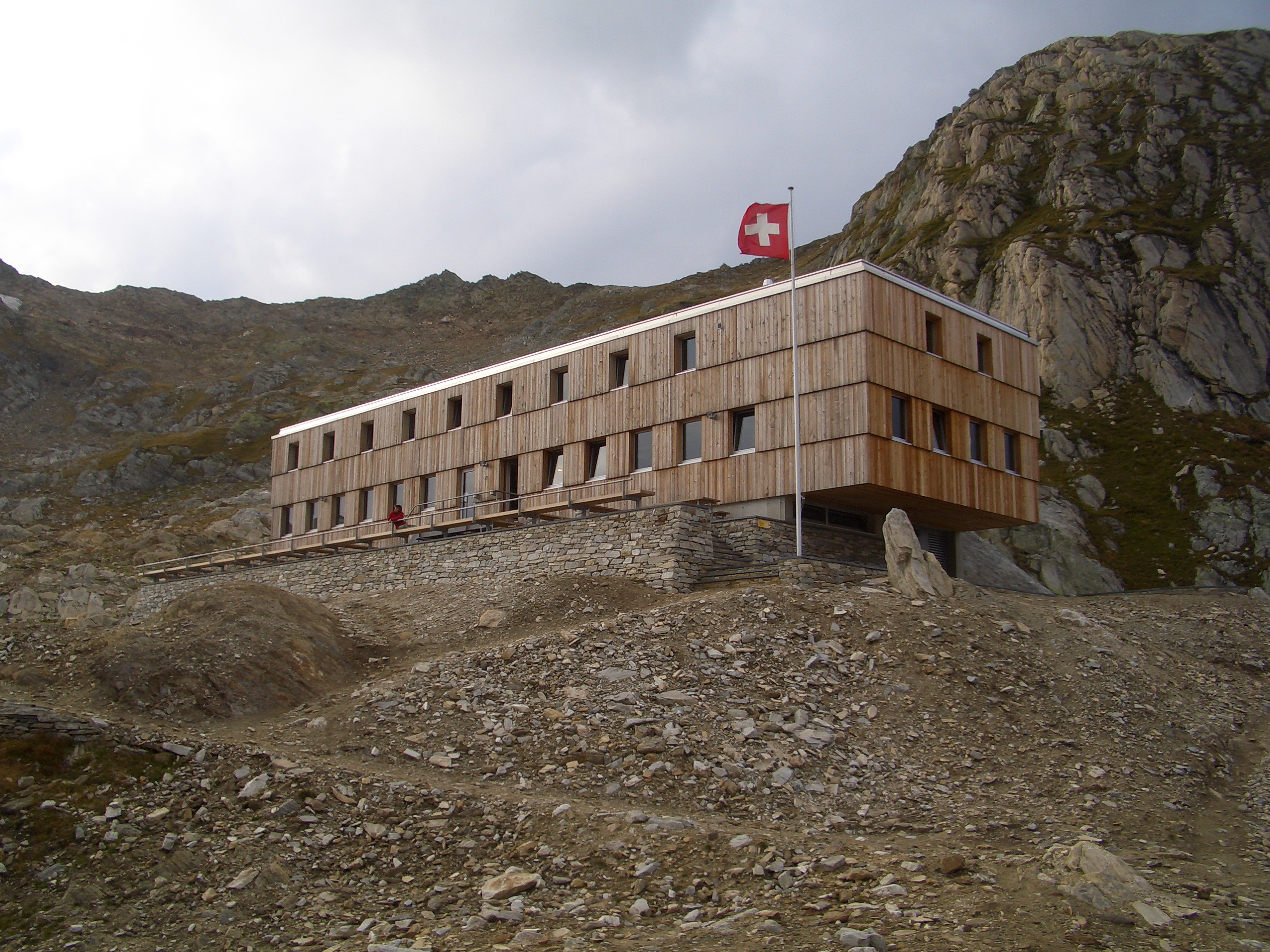
The Cappanna Cristallina
