= Airolo =

- Municipality
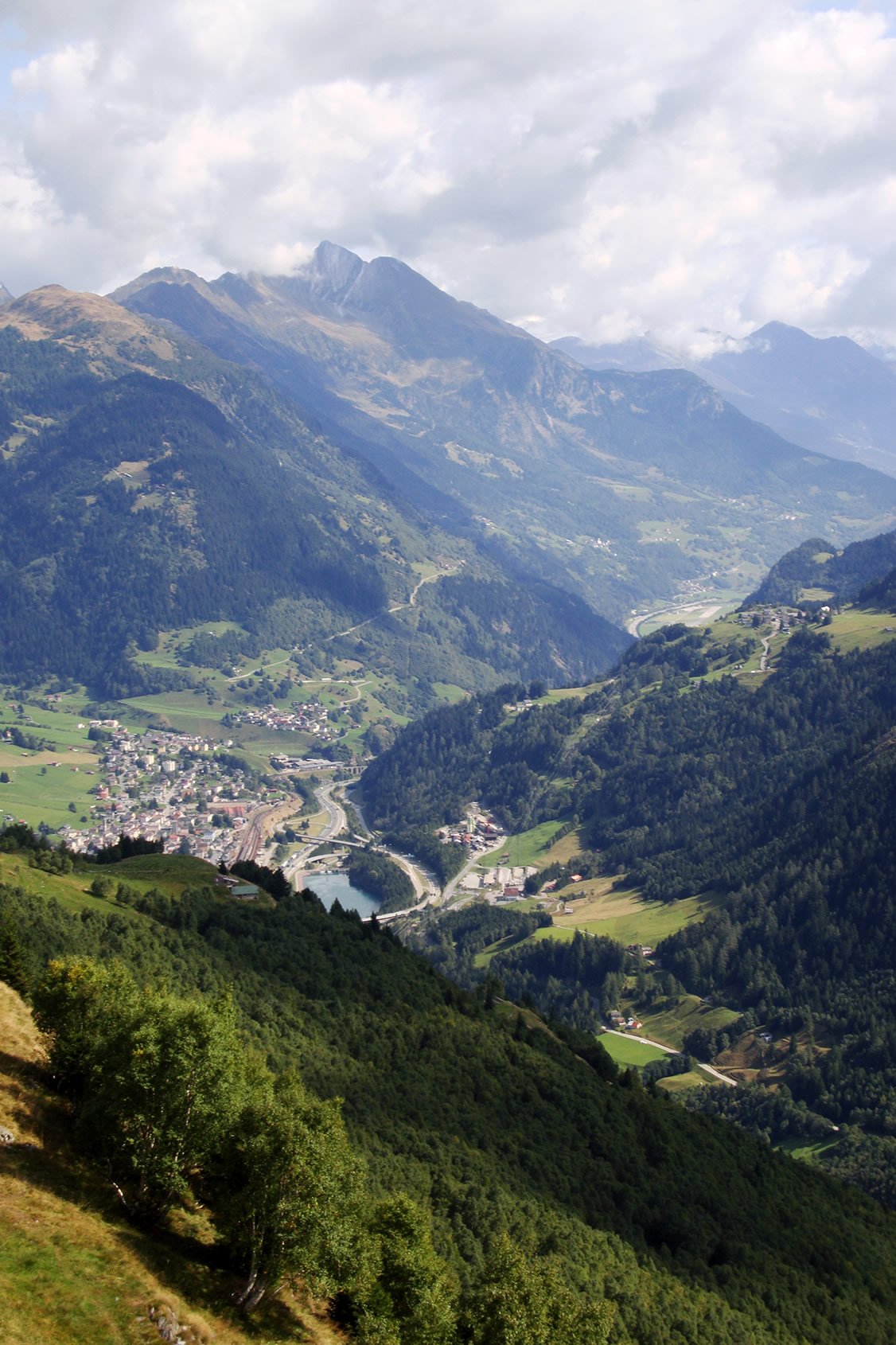

- Flag Coat of arms
- Location of Airolo
- Location within Switzerland Location within Canton of Ticino
- Coordinates: 46°32′N 8°37′E
- Country: Switzerland
- Canton: Ticino
- District: Leventina

Government
  - Mayor: Sindaco; Franco Pedrini

Area
  - Total: 94.37 km^{2} (36.44 sq mi)
- Elevation: 1,175 m (3,855 ft)

Population (December 2002)
  - Total: 2,032
  - Density: 21.53/km^{2} (55.77/sq mi)
- Time zone: UTC+01:00 (CET)
  - Summer (DST): UTC+02:00 (CEST)
- Postal code: 6780-6781
- SFOS number: 5061
- ISO 3166 code: CH-TI
- Surrounded by: Andermatt (UR), Bedretto, Hospental (UR), Lavizzara, Quinto, Realp (UR), Tujetsch (GR)
- Website: airolo.ch

Airolo (Airöö in Lombard, in Romansh: Iriel) is a municipality in the district of Leventina in the canton of Ticino in Switzerland.

== Geography ==
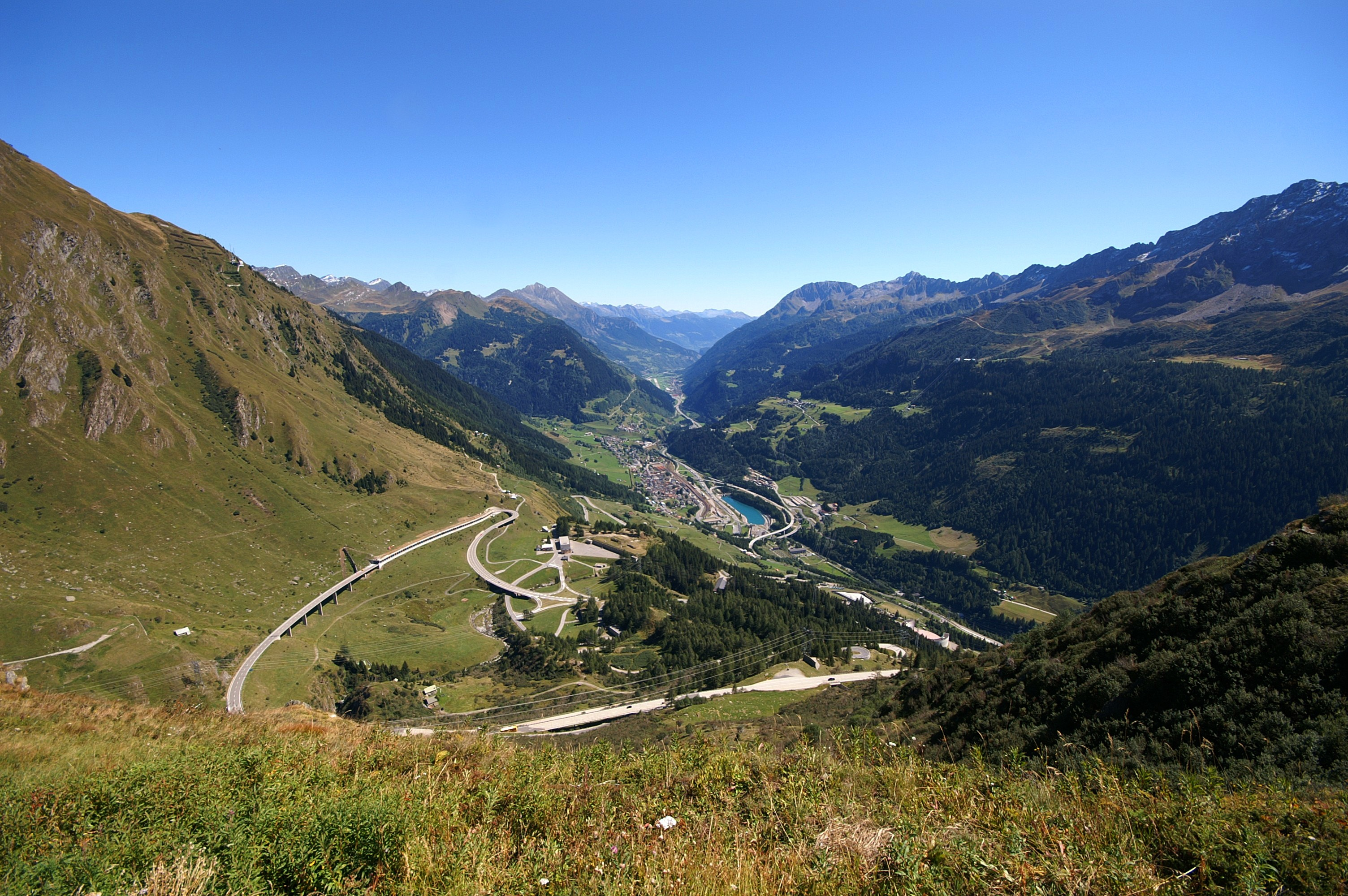
View from halfway up St. Gotthard Pass (before entering the Val Tremola) down toward Airolo and the Leventina valley

Aerial view by Walter Mittelholzer (1931)

Airolo is located in Leventina valley and the Lepontine Alps, on the southern flank of the St. Gotthard Pass. Both the Gotthard rail tunnel, on the important Gotthard railway linking northern and southern Europe, and the Gotthard road tunnel, on the A2 motorway, have their southern portal in Airolo. It is the largest municipality in the canton of Ticino, and consists of the village of Airolo and the hamlets of Valle, Madrano, Brugnasco, Nante and Fontana. The municipalities of Airolo and Quinto are considering a merger some time in the future into a new municipality which will be known as Airolo-Quinto.

Airolo has an area, as of 1997, of 94.37 square kilometers (36.44 sq mi). Of this area, 3.64 km^{2} (1.41 sq mi) or 3.9% is used for agricultural purposes, while 20.48 km^{2} (7.91 sq mi) or 21.7% is forested. Of the rest of the land, 2.7 km^{2} (1.0 sq mi) or 2.9% is settled (buildings or roads), 2.3 km^{2} (0.89 sq mi) or 2.4% is either rivers or lakes and 39.3 km^{2} (15.2 sq mi) or 41.6% is unproductive land.

Of the built up area, housing and buildings made up 0.6% and transportation infrastructure made up 1.8%. Out of the forested land, 14.9% of the total land area is heavily forested and 1.5% is covered with orchards or small clusters of trees. Of the agricultural land, 3.2% is used for growing crops. Of the water in the municipality, 1.5% is in lakes and 0.9% is in rivers and streams. Of the unproductive areas, 20.2% is unproductive vegetation and 21.4% is too rocky for vegetation.

== Coat of arms ==
The blazon of the municipal coat of arms is Azure on a base Vert a fir tree Argent issuant and a lion rampant Or.

== Demographics ==
Airolo has a population (as of December 2020) of 1,476. As of 2008, 21.5% of the population are foreign nationals. Over the last 10 years (1997–2007) the population has changed at a rate of −14.6%.

Most of the population (as of 2000) speaks Italian (85.6%), with German being second most common (3.6%) and Serbo-Croatian being third (3.3%). Of the Swiss national languages (as of 2000), 57 speak German, 8 people speak French, 1,363 people speak Italian, and 1 person speaks Romansh. The remainder (164 people) speak another language.

As of 2008, the gender distribution of the population was 49.9% male and 50.1% female. The population was made up of 577 Swiss men (37.6% of the population), and 189 (12.3%) non-Swiss men. There were 641 Swiss women (41.8%), and 128 (8.3%) non-Swiss women.

In 2008 there were 6 live births to Swiss citizens and 6 births to non-Swiss citizens, and in same time span there were 20 deaths of Swiss citizens. Ignoring immigration and emigration, the population of Swiss citizens decreased by 14 while the foreign population increased by 6. There was 1 Swiss woman who immigrated back to Switzerland. At the same time, there were 2 non-Swiss men who emigrated from Switzerland to another country and 5 non-Swiss women who immigrated from another country to Switzerland. The total Swiss population change in 2008 (from all sources) was a decrease of 2 and the non-Swiss population change was a decrease of 28 people. This represents a population growth rate of −1.9%.

The age distribution, as of 2009, in Airolo is as follows: 114 children or 7.4% of the population are between 0 and 9 years old and 131 teenagers or 8.5% are between 10 and 19. Of the adult population, 184 people or 12.0% of the population are between 20 and 29 years old. 198 people or 12.9% are between 30 and 39, 215 people or 14.0% are between 40 and 49, and 234 people or 15.2% are between 50 and 59. The senior population distribution is 221 people or 14.4% of the population are between 60 and 69 years old, 130 people or 8.5% are between 70 and 79, there are 108 people or 7.0% who are over 80.

As of 2000, there were 700 private households in the municipality, and an average of 2.2 persons per household. In 2000 there were 503 single family homes (or 66.4% of the total) out of a total of 757 inhabited buildings. There were 88 two family buildings (11.6%) and 114 multi-family buildings (15.1%). There were also 52 buildings in the municipality that were multipurpose buildings (used for both housing and commercial or another purpose).

The vacancy rate for the municipality, in 2008, was 3.31%. In 2000 there were 1,325 apartments in the municipality. The most common apartment size was the 3 room apartment of which there were 393. There were 78 single room apartments and 314 apartments with five or more rooms. Of these apartments, a total of 698 apartments (52.7% of the total) were permanently occupied, while 585 apartments (44.2%) were seasonally occupied and 42 apartments (3.2%) were empty. As of 2007, the construction rate of new housing units was 0.6 new units per 1000 residents.

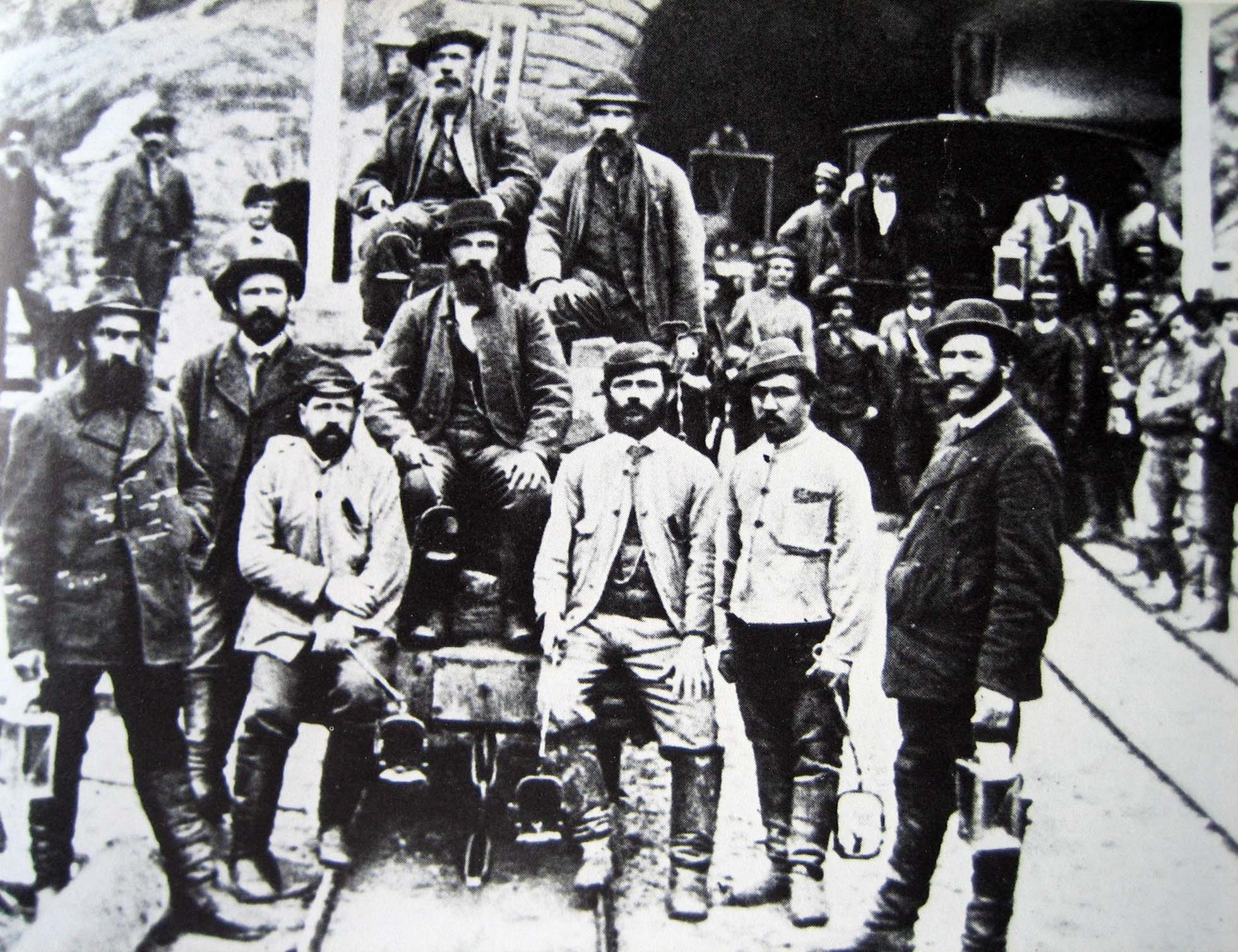
Workers on the Gotthard Tunnel, 1880

The historical population is given in the following table:

year	population
1574	597
1682	1,000
1785	1,237
1850	1,624
1880	3,678 ^{a}
1900	1,628
1950	1,848
2000	1,593

^a Population during construction of the St. Gotthard Tunnel

== Heritage sites ==
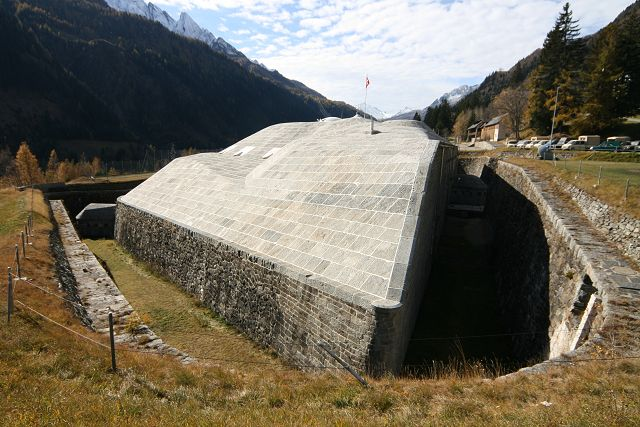
Forte Airolo

The Hospice Complex on the St. Gotthard Pass with old station, house and barn, the Forte Airolo and Forte Foppa, the prehistoric settlement and Roman era necropolis of Madrano and the prehistoric settlement on the St. Gotthard Pass (known as Alpe di Rodont) are listed as Swiss heritage site of national significance. The entire town of Airolo and the village of Fontana are listed in the Inventory of Swiss Heritage Sites.

== Church ==
In 1877 a fire destroyed almost all of the town, including most of the church dedicated to Santi Nazario e Celso, which had been built in the 12th century and is first documented in 1224. The tower, crowned by a double row of twin arches has survived from the Romanesque building. In 1879 the church was rebuilt, under the auspices of an Uri lawyer based in Airolo, Carl Alois (Luigi) Müller, who was married to Genovefa Lombardi, the daughter of Felice Lombardi, Director of the St Gotthard hospice. There is a marble plaque in the church recording his efforts to get the church rebuilt.

== St Gotthard Tunnel Memorial ==
This is a bronze bas-relief by the Ticinese sculptor Vincenzo Vela (1820–1891) commemorating the labourers who died building the tunnel in the 1880s.

== Politics ==
In the 2007 federal election the most popular party was the CVP which received 36.19% of the vote. The next three most popular parties were the FDP (29.1%), the Ticino League (16.16%) and the SP (9.11%). In the federal election, a total of 676 votes were cast, and the voter turnout was 64.3%.

In the 2007 Gran Consiglio election, there were a total of 1,109 registered voters in Airolo, of which 870 or 78.4% voted. 13 blank ballots and 2 null ballots were cast, leaving 855 valid ballots in the election. The most popular party was the PPD+GenGiova which received 298 or 34.9% of the vote. The next three most popular parties were; the PLRT (with 243 or 28.4%), the SSI (with 119 or 13.9%) and the LEGA (with 88 or 10.3%).

In the 2007 Consiglio di Stato election, 9 blank ballots and 3 null ballots were cast, leaving 857 valid ballots in the election. The most popular party was the PPD which received 290 or 33.8% of the vote. The next three most popular parties were; the PLRT (with 239 or 27.9%), the LEGA (with 140 or 16.3%) and the SSI (with 105 or 12.3%).

== Economy ==
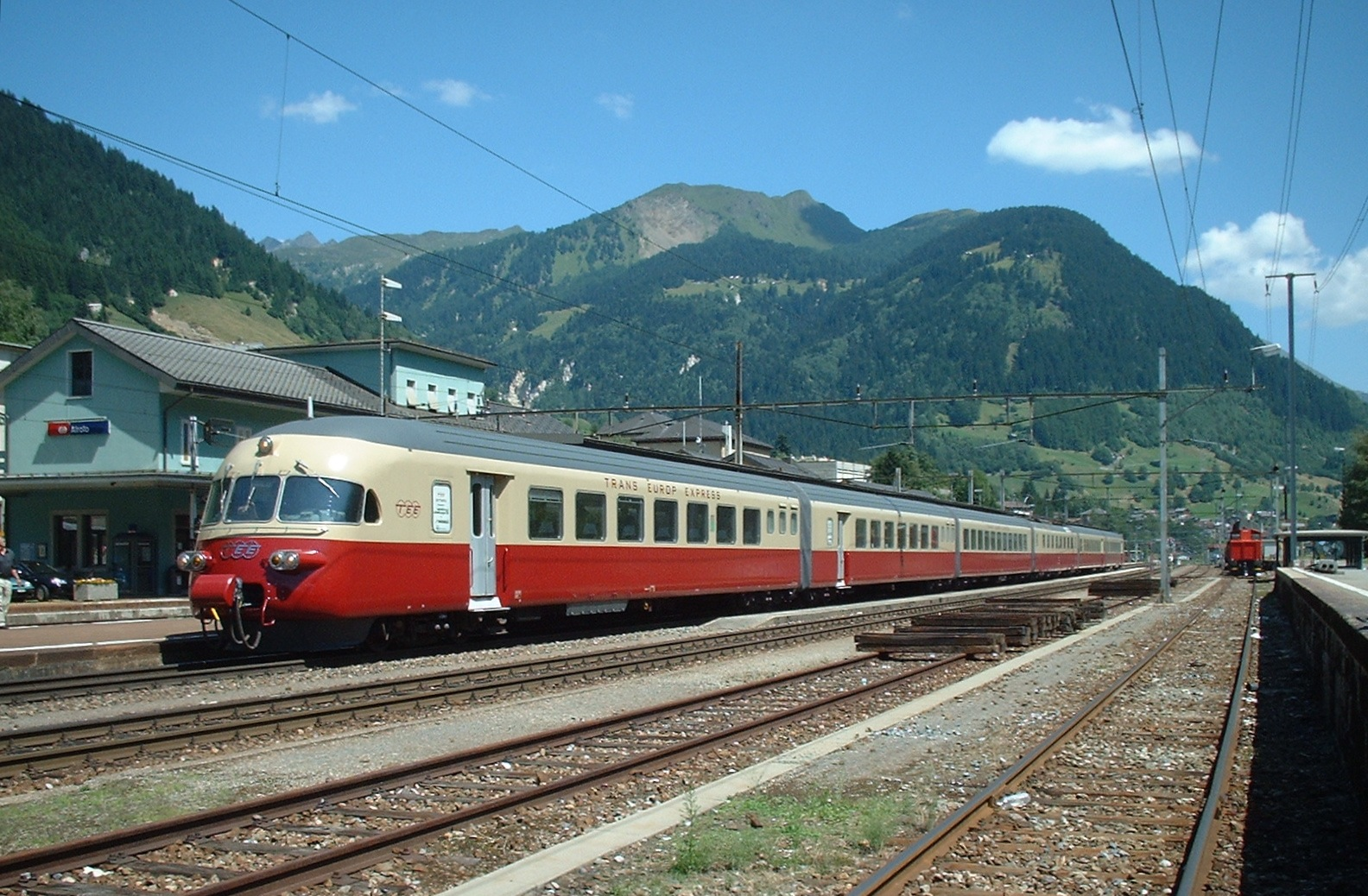
Train station of Airolo

As of 2007, Airolo had an unemployment rate of 2.58%. As of 2005, there were 65 people employed in the primary economic sector and about 24 businesses involved in this sector. 356 people were employed in the secondary sector and there were 20 businesses in this sector. 596 people were employed in the tertiary sector, with 74 businesses in this sector. There were 774 residents of the municipality who were employed in some capacity, of which females made up 34.5% of the workforce.

In 2000, there were 451 workers who commuted into the municipality and 161 workers who commuted away. The municipality is a net importer of workers, with about 2.8 workers entering the municipality for every one leaving. Of the working population, 5.6% used public transportation to get to work, and 47.4% used a private car.

As of 2009, there were 8 hotels in Airolo with a total of 137 rooms and 322 beds.

== Ski facilities ==
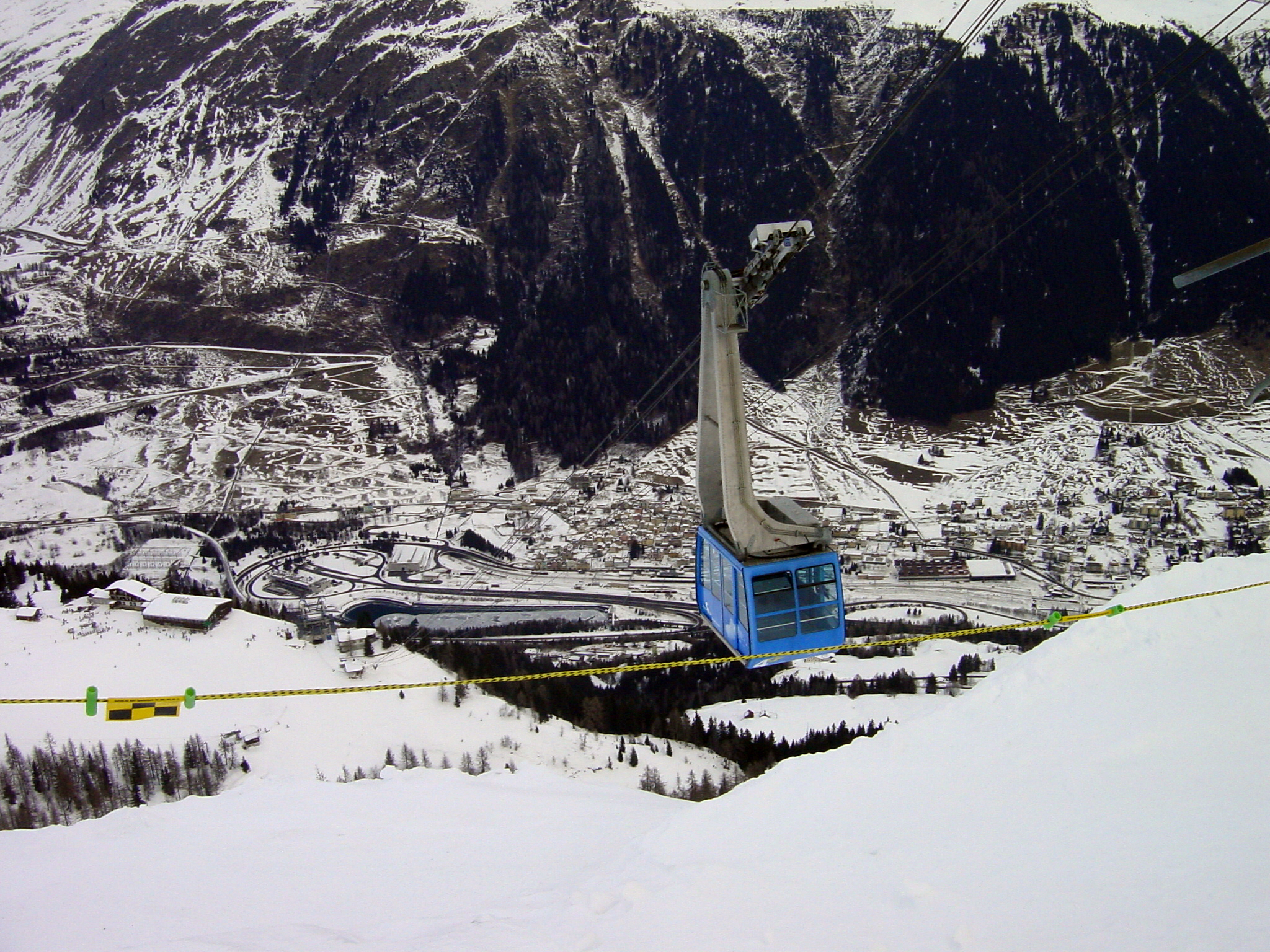
Airolo in winter from the Sasso della Boggia

Airolo is also home to a small ski-resort with 30 km (19 mi) of prepared slopes.

== Religion ==
From the 2000 census, 1,287 or 80.8% were Roman Catholic, while 34 or 2.1% belonged to the Swiss Reformed Church. There are 243 individuals (or about 15.25% of the population) who belong to another church (not listed on the census), and 29 individuals (or about 1.82% of the population) did not answer the question.

== Weather ==
Airolo has an average of 121.4 days of rain or snow per year and on average receives 1,662 mm (65.4 in) of precipitation. The wettest month is October during which time Airolo receives an average of 193 mm (7.6 in) of rain or snow. During this month there is precipitation for an average of 9.3 days. The month with the most days of precipitation is May, with an average of 13, but with only 184 mm (7.2 in) of rain or snow. The driest month of the year is January with an average of 88 mm (3.5 in) of precipitation over 9.3 days.

== Education ==
In Airolo about 61.3% of the population (between age 25–64) have completed either non-mandatory upper secondary education or additional higher education (either university or a Fachhochschule).

In Airolo there was a total of 218 students (as of 2009). The Ticino education system provides up to three years of non-mandatory kindergarten and in Airolo there were 35 children in kindergarten. The primary school program lasts for five years and includes both a standard school and a special school. In the municipality, 67 students attended the standard primary schools and 0 students attended the special school. In the lower secondary school system, students either attend a two-year middle school followed by a two-year pre-apprenticeship or they attend a four-year program to prepare for higher education. There were 52 students in the two-year middle school and 1 in their pre-apprenticeship, while 11 students were in the four-year advanced program.

The upper secondary school includes several options, but at the end of the upper secondary program, a student will be prepared to enter a trade or to continue on to a university or college. In Ticino, vocational students may either attend school while working on their internship or apprenticeship (which takes three or four years) or may attend school followed by an internship or apprenticeship (which takes one year as a full-time student or one and a half to two years as a part-time student). There were 19 vocational students who were attending school full-time and 31 who attend part-time.

The professional program lasts three years and prepares a student for a job in engineering, nursing, computer science, business, tourism and similar fields. There were 2 students in the professional program.

As of 2000, there were 14 students in Airolo who came from another municipality, while 31 residents attended schools outside the municipality.

== Transport ==
Airolo is served by Airolo station, on the Gotthard railway, which is situated in the village centre. The station is served by an hourly InterRegio train between Arth-Goldau and Locarno, most of which start from either Basel SBB or Zürich HB. Bus services include an hourly service to Bellinzona, together with a less frequent route across the Novena Pass to Oberwald.

== Famous people ==
- Felice Lombardi (1791–1863), son of Giuseppe, Ticino cantonal parliament was in 1841 appointed by the Ticino State Council as Head of the Hospice on the Gotthard Pass.
- Emilio Motta (1855–1920), historian
- Adolfo Müller-Ury (1862–1947) (Citizenship Hospental), painter, son of Alois and Genovefa Müller-Lombardi
- Giuseppe Motta (1871–1940), Swiss politician (CIP), Bundesrat.
- Eugenio Corecco (1931–1995), Roman Catholic bishop in Diocese of Lugano in the canton Ticino
- Giorgio Orelli (1921–2013), Swiss writer, literary critic, translator and lecturer.
- Giovanni Lombardi (born 1926), Swiss engineer, known for tunnel and dam projects
- Marco Lombardi (1941–2014), lawyer, former President of the Hockey Club Ambri-Piotta
- Filippo Lombardi (born 1956), Swiss politician (CVP) and entrepreneur, President of States (2012 and 2013)
- Katrin Müller (born 1989) is a Swiss freestyle skier, ski crosser
- Lara Gut (born 1991), skier, lives in Canobbio

== See also ==
- Bedretto
- Bedretto Underground Laboratory for Geoenergies
- Rotondo Granite
