= Klein Grieshorn =

Mountain in Switzerland

- Piccolo Corno Gries
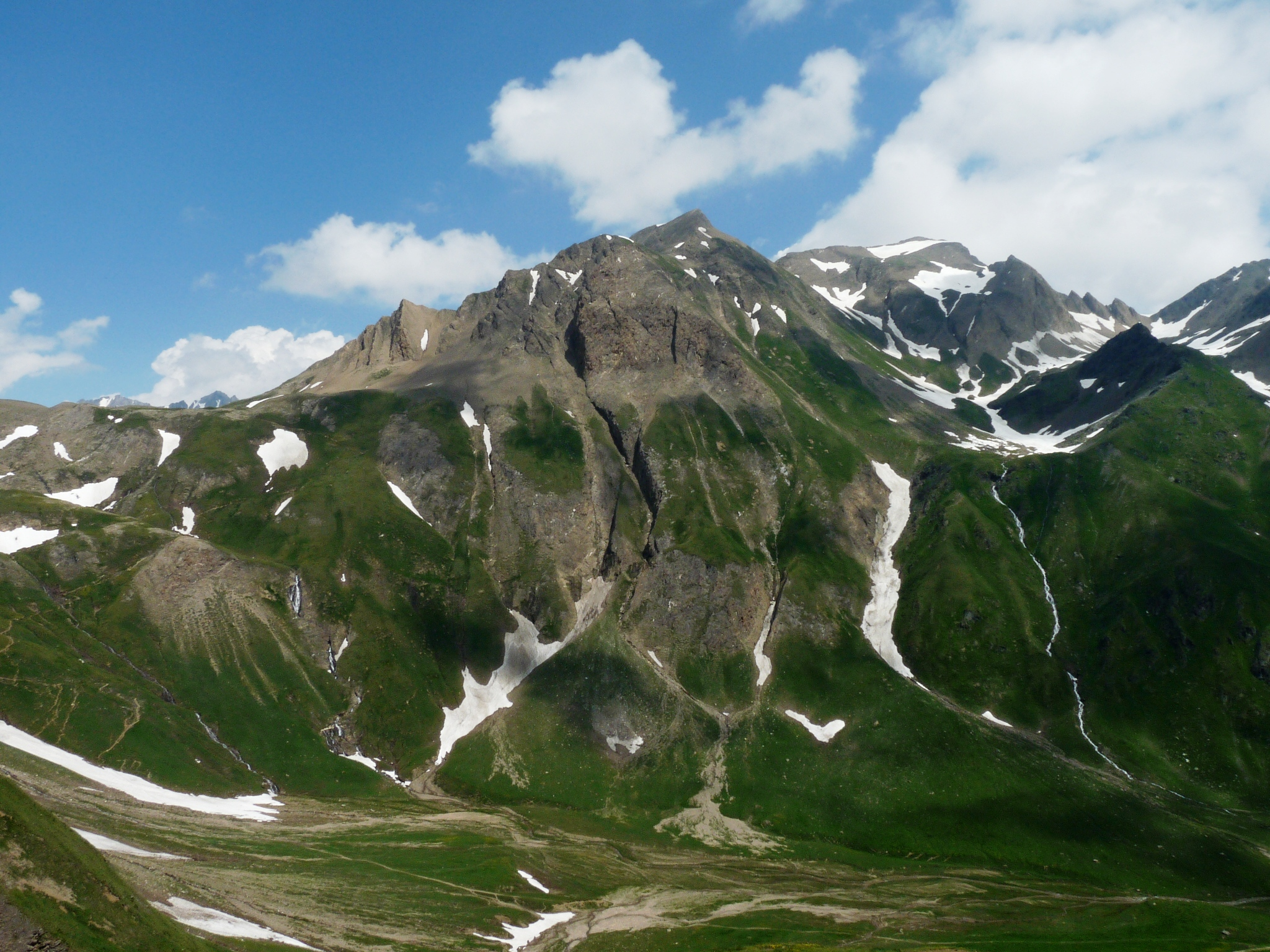

Highest point
- Elevation: 2,930 m (9,610 ft)
- Prominence: 125 m (410 ft)
- Parent peak: Grieshorn
- Coordinates: 46°27′8.1″N 8°23′5″E

Geography
- Location within Alps
- Location: Valais/Ticino, Switzerland; Piedmont, Italy
- Parent range: Lepontine Alps

The Klein Grieshorn (or Piccolo Corno Gries) is a mountain of the Lepontine Alps, located on the Swiss-Italian border. The summit is the tripoint between the cantons of Valais, Ticino and the region of Piedmont.
