= Rotondo Granite =

Granitic intrusion in the Saint-Gotthard Massif (Swiss Alps)

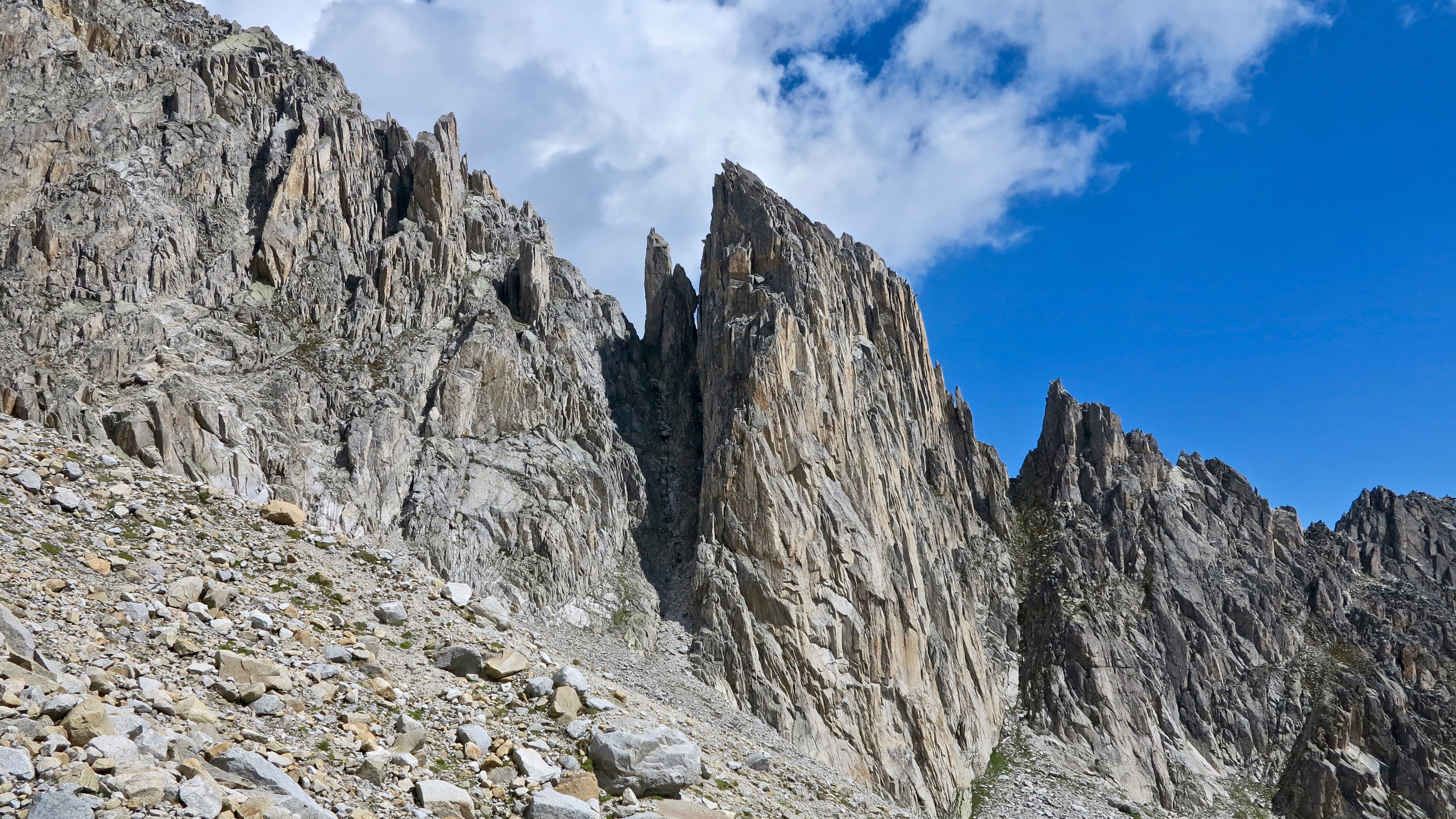
Ridge made of Rotondo Granite.

The Rotondo Granite is a late Variscan granitic intrusion located in the Saint-Gotthard Massif in the Swiss Alps. Its name comes from the Pizzo Rotondo.

== Description ==
It shows as a fine to medium-grained granite. Unlike other granitic intrusions present in the Gotthard Massif (Gamsboden Granite and Fibbia Granite), the foliation is only very weakly developed and is mostly visible in ductile shear zones. Radiometric dating showed an age of 294 Ma. On surface, it outcrops over an area of 20–25 km^{2}.

The Rotondo Granite forms at least part of Monte Prosa.

== Bedretto Underground Laboratory for Geoenergies ==
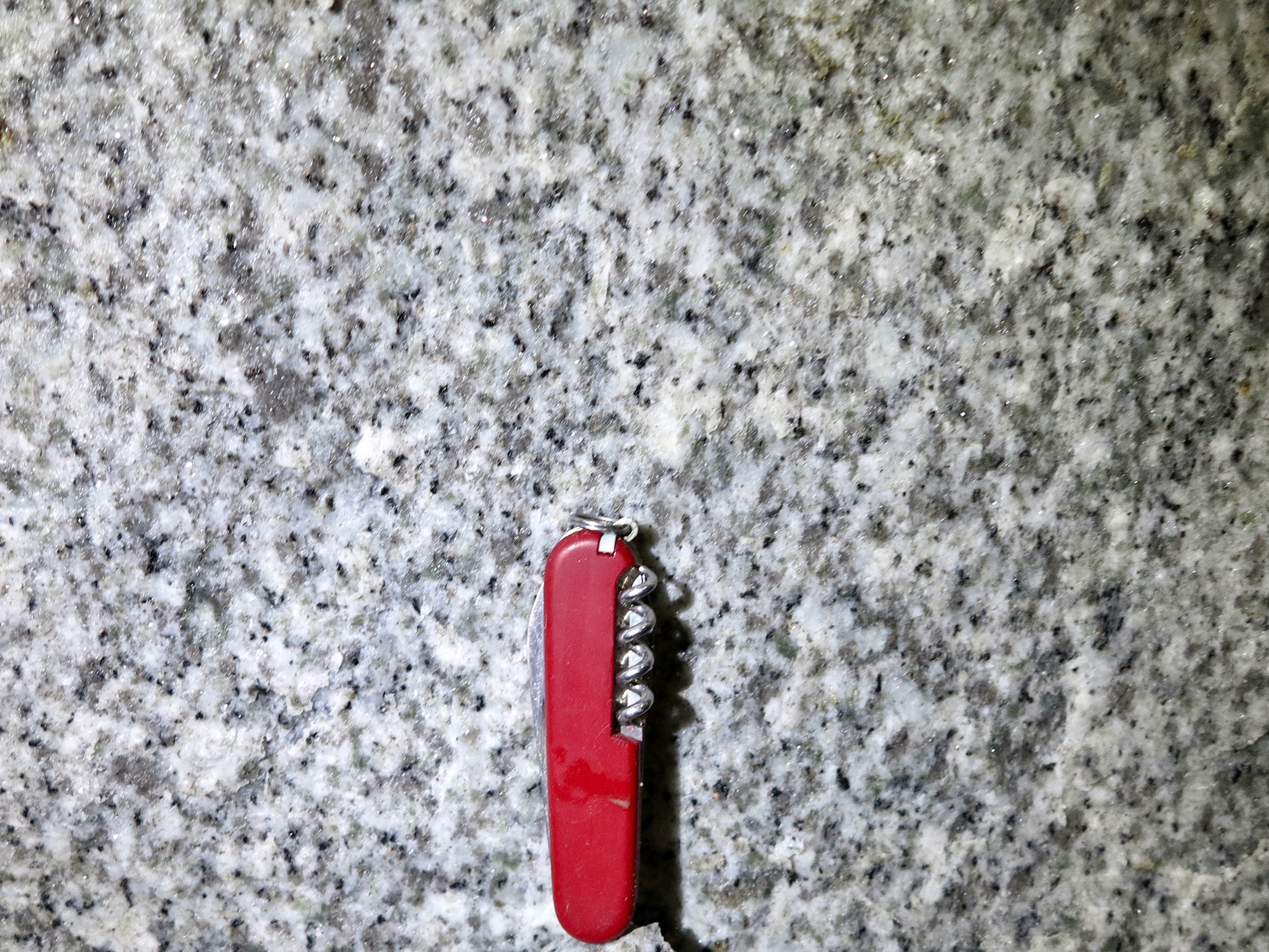
Fresh Rotondo Granite surface in the Bedretto Tunnel.

The Bedretto Underground Laboratory for Geoenergies which is located in the Bedretto Tunnel (in German "Bedretto-Fenster"), is performing research on deep geothermal energy in the Rotondo Granite. The underground laboratory is operated by the Swiss Federal Institute of Technology in Zürich (ETH Zurich). The site was selected, among other reasons, because of the similarities that this rock shows with basement rocks that are expected to be encountered at a depth of 4–5 km below the Swiss Plateau.

== See also ==
- Furka Base Tunnel
