= San Gottardo =

San Gottardo may refer to:

- Gotthard of Hildesheim (960–1038), German bishop venerated as a saint
- San Gottardo, Milan, a church in Milan, Italy
- San Gottardo Altarpiece, a 1518 oil-on-canvas painting by Giovanni Cariani
- Saint-Gotthard Massif (Italian: Massiccio del San Gottardo), a mountain range in the Alps
  - Gotthard Pass (Italian: Passo del San Gottardo), a mountain pass in the massif
- Tremola San Gottardo, a road in the Canton of Ticino, Switzerland

== See also ==
- Gottardo (disambiguation)
