= Gotthard Tunnel (disambiguation) =

Tunnels traversing the Saint-Gotthard Massif in Switzerland:

- Gotthard (Rail) Tunnel, 15km railway culmination tunnel (1882)
- Gotthard Road Tunnel, 17km motorway tunnel (1980)
- Gotthard Base Tunnel, 57km railway lowest-level tunnel (2016)

== See also ==
- Gotthard (disambiguation)
