= Pizzo Centrale =

Mountain in Switzerland

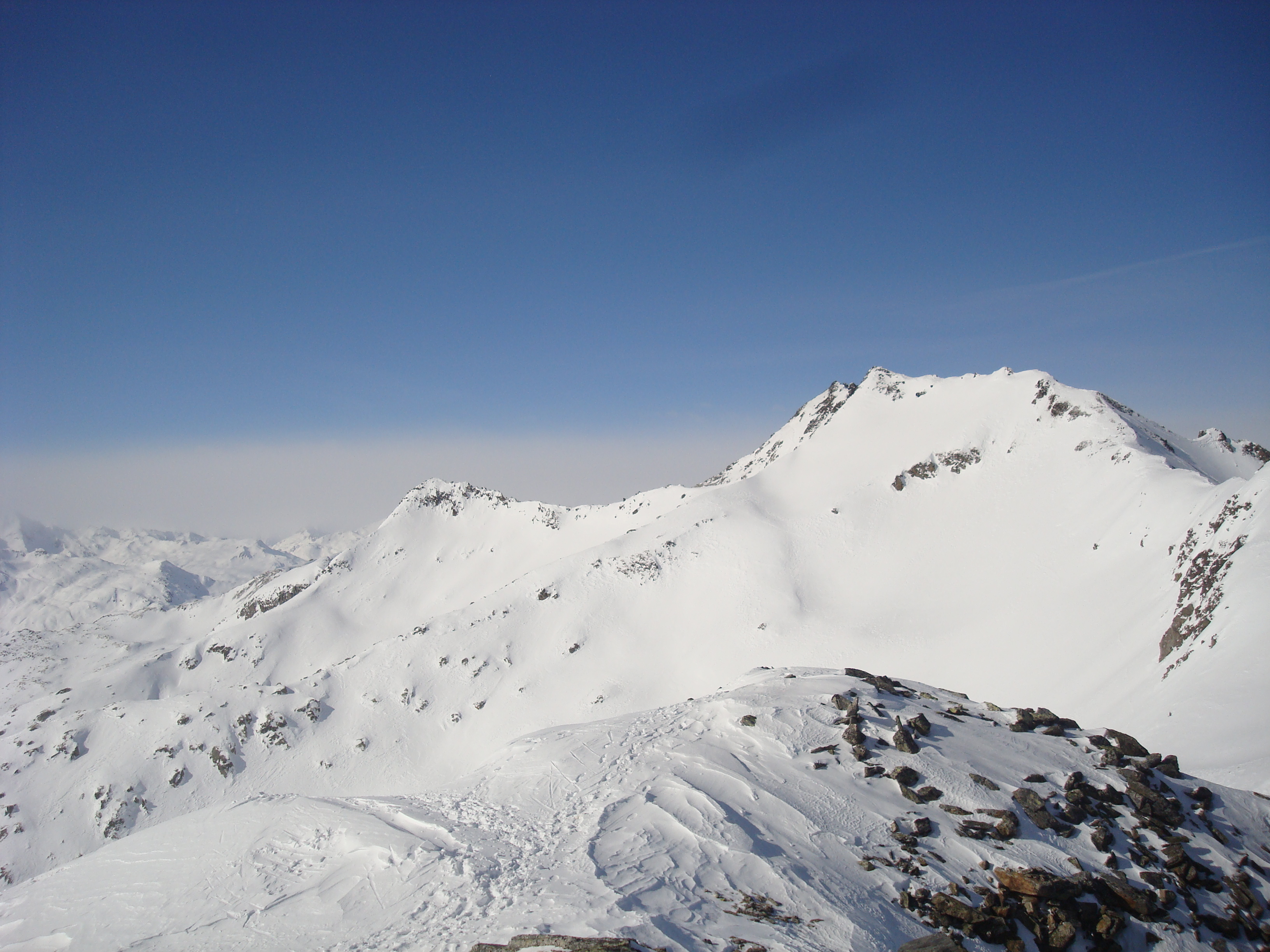
- Pizzo Centrale

Highest point
- Elevation: 2,999 m (9,839 ft)
- Prominence: 451 m (1,480 ft)
- Parent peak: Piz Gannaretsch
- Listing: Alpine mountains 2500-2999 m
- Coordinates: 46°34′41.2″N 8°36′53.9″E

Geography
- Location within Switzerland
- Location: Ticino/Uri, Switzerland
- Parent range: Lepontine Alps

Pizzo Centrale is a mountain in the Lepontine Alps, located on the border between the cantons of Uri and Ticino. At 2,999 metres above sea level, it is the highest summit overlooking Gotthard Pass from the east. Lago della Sella is located on its southern side. Over its northern side lies a glacier, named Ober Schatzfirn.

The summit can be reached by experienced hikers via a trail starting at Lago della Sella.
