= Gotthard =

Gotthard or Saint Gotthard (Italian: San Gottardo) may refer to:

== People ==
- Gotthard of Hildesheim (960–1038), Roman Catholic saint
- Gotthard Heinrici (1886–1971), German general
- Uziel Gal, who grew up as Gotthard Glas

== Places ==
- Saint-Gotthard Massif, a mountain range in Switzerland
- Gotthard nappe, the geological structure underneath the Saint-Gotthard Massif
- Gotthard Pass, a mountain pass between Airolo (Ticino) and Andermatt (Uri) in Switzerland
- Tunnels underneath Gotthard Pass:
  - Gotthard Rail Tunnel (1882)
  - Gotthard Road Tunnel (1980)
  - Gotthard Base Tunnel (2016, part of the NRLA)
- Gotthard railway line, a trans-alpine railway line in Switzerland
- Sankt Gotthard im Mühlviertel, a village in Upper Austria
- Szentgotthárd, a town in Western Hungary

== Other uses ==
- Gotthard (band), a Swiss hard rock band
- Battle of Saint Gotthard (1664), a battle in the Austro-Turkish War fought near Szentgotthárd
- Battle of Saint Gotthard (1705), a battle in Rákóczi's War for Independence fought near Szentgotthárd
- Gotthard (album)

== See also ==
- Gottardo (disambiguation)
- San Gottardo (disambiguation)
