= Gottardo =

Gottardo may refer to:

- Gottardo (train), express train connecting Zurich, Switzerland, with Milan, Italy

== Person ==
- Alexandra Gottardo (born 1985), Indonesian model, film and television actress
- Daniele Gottardo, Italian guitarist and composer
- Wilson Gottardo (born 1963), Brazilian former association footballer

== See also ==
- San Gottardo (disambiguation)
- Gotthard (disambiguation)
