= San Bernardino Altarpiece (Lotto) =

1521 painting by Lorenzo Lotto

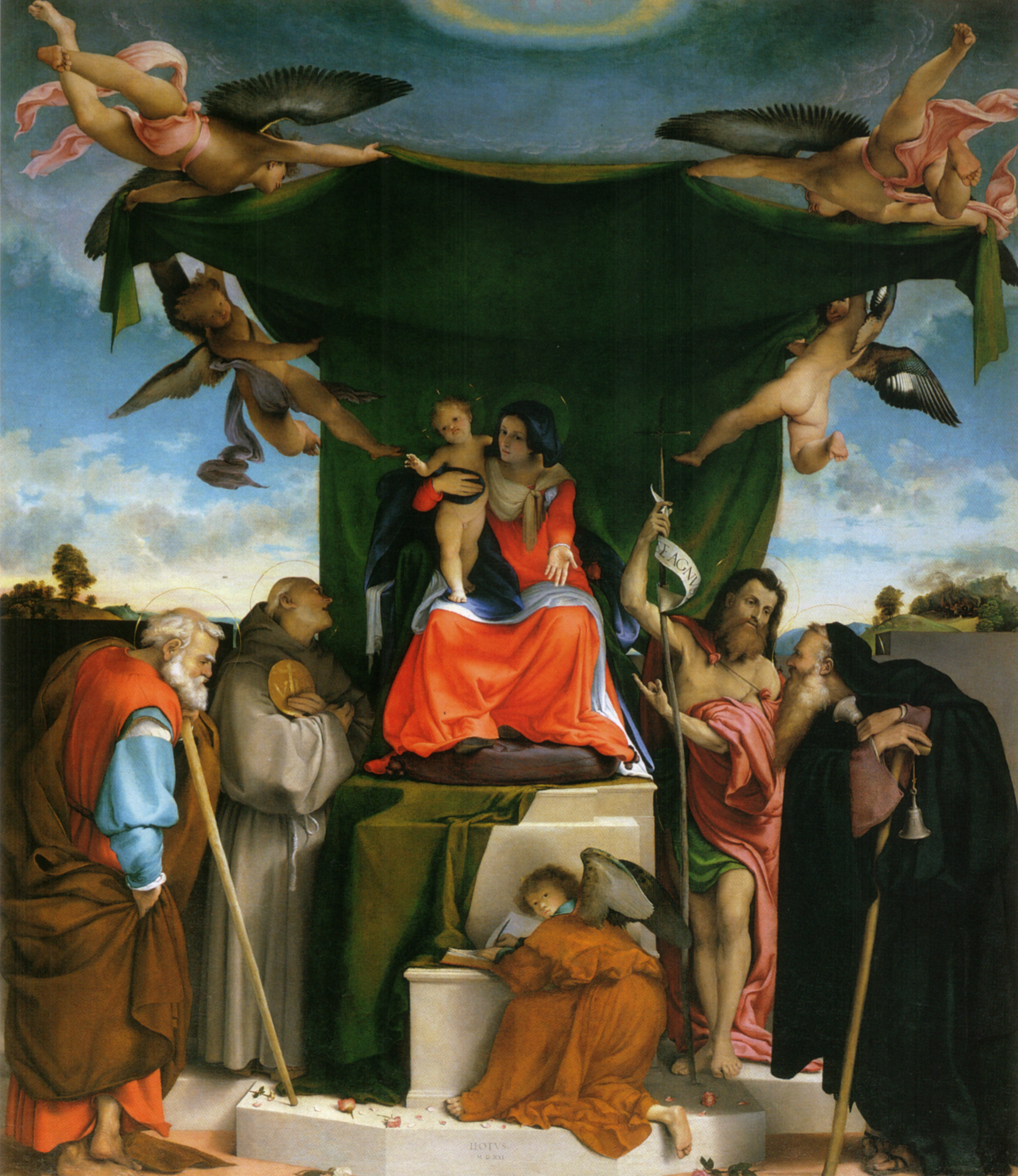
San Bernardino Altarpiece (1521) by Lorenzo Lotto

The San Bernardino Altarpiece is an oil on canvas painting by Lorenzo Lotto, created in 1521, named after the chapel on Via Pignolo in Bergamo, for which it was commissioned by the 'Disciplinati', a lay confraternity. It still hangs in its original position. Lotto also worked on the Santo Spirito Altarpiece at around the same time for the Church of Santo Spirito in Bergamo.

The work is signed and dated "LLotus / M D XXI" on the lowest step in the centre. Lotto may have been inspired by Raphael's Madonna of the Baldacchino, which he could have seen on his 1510 trip to Florence, and Giovanni Cariani's 1517 San Gottardo Altarpiece in the church of that name in Bergamo. To the left of the Madonna and Child are Saint Joseph and Bernardino of Siena, whilst to the right are John the Baptist and Anthony Abbot.

== Gallery ==
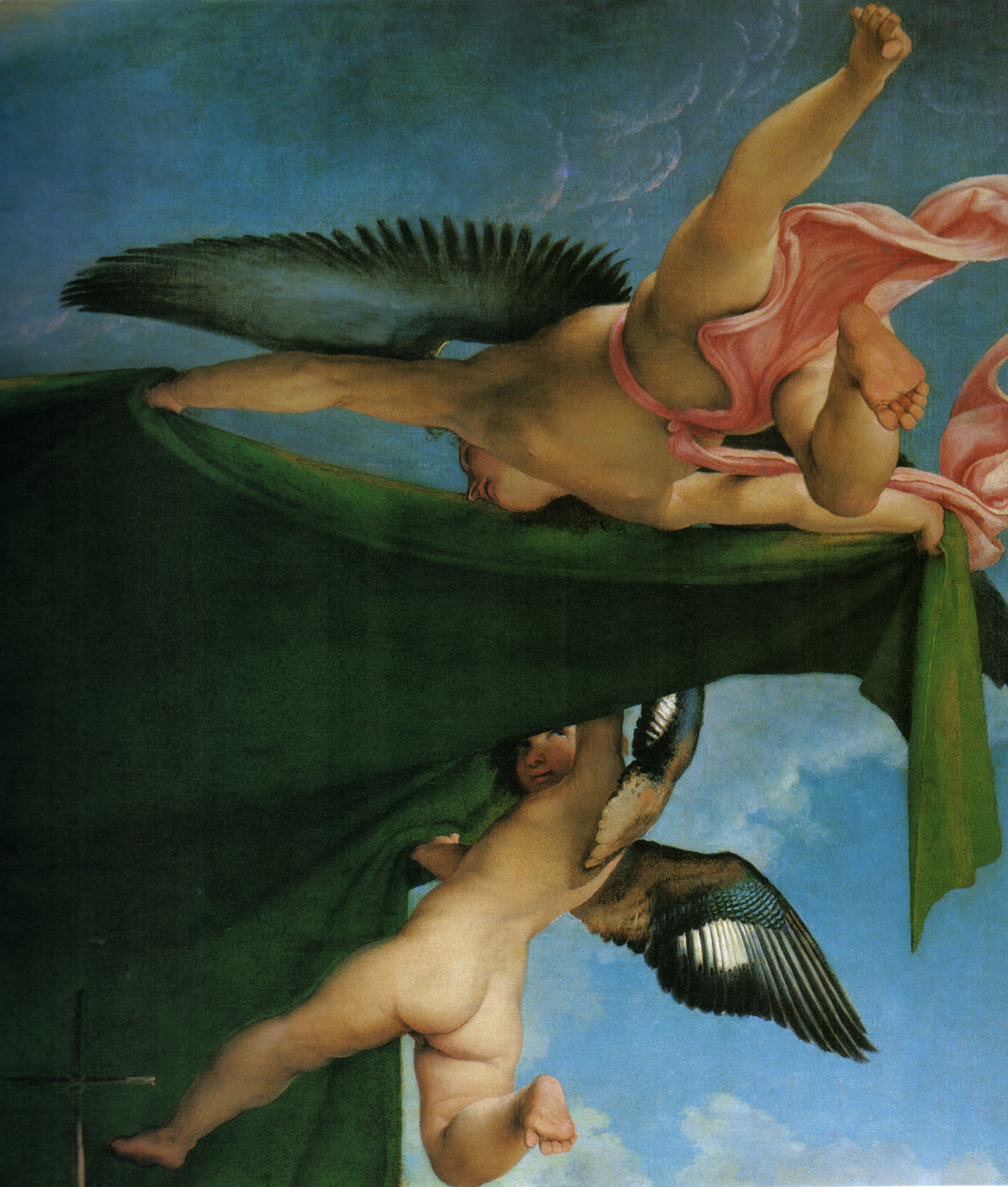
Detail

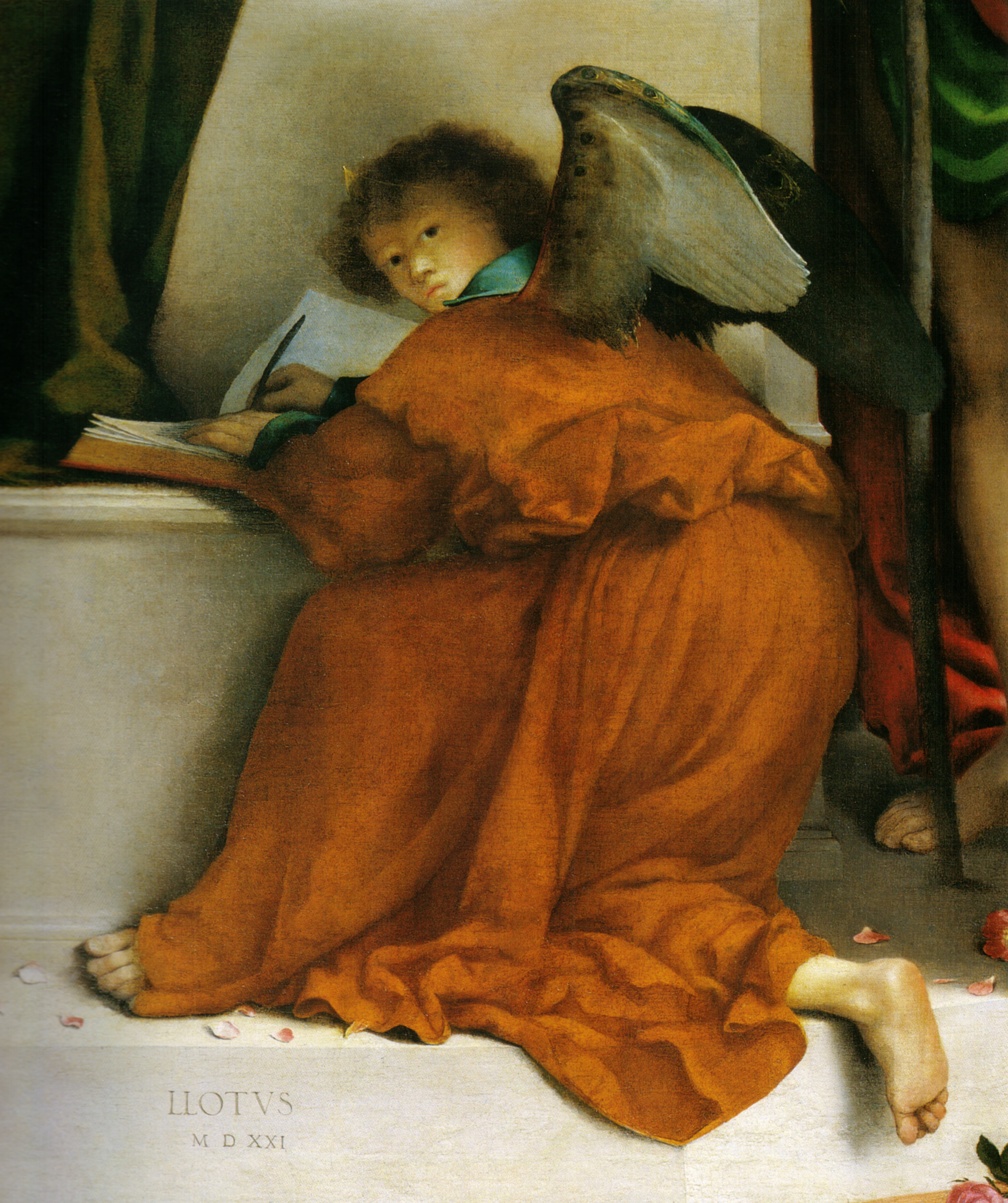
Detail

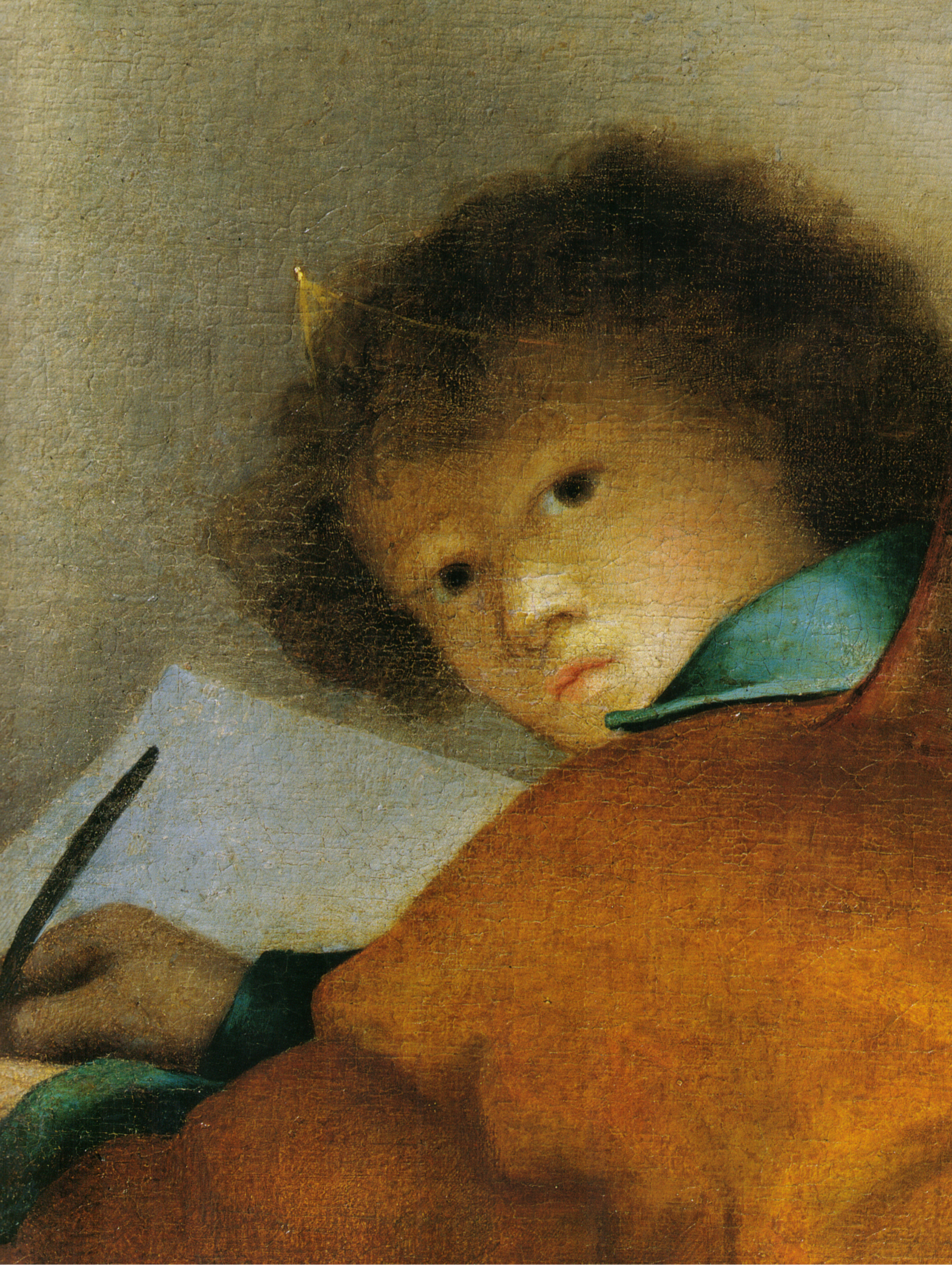
Detail

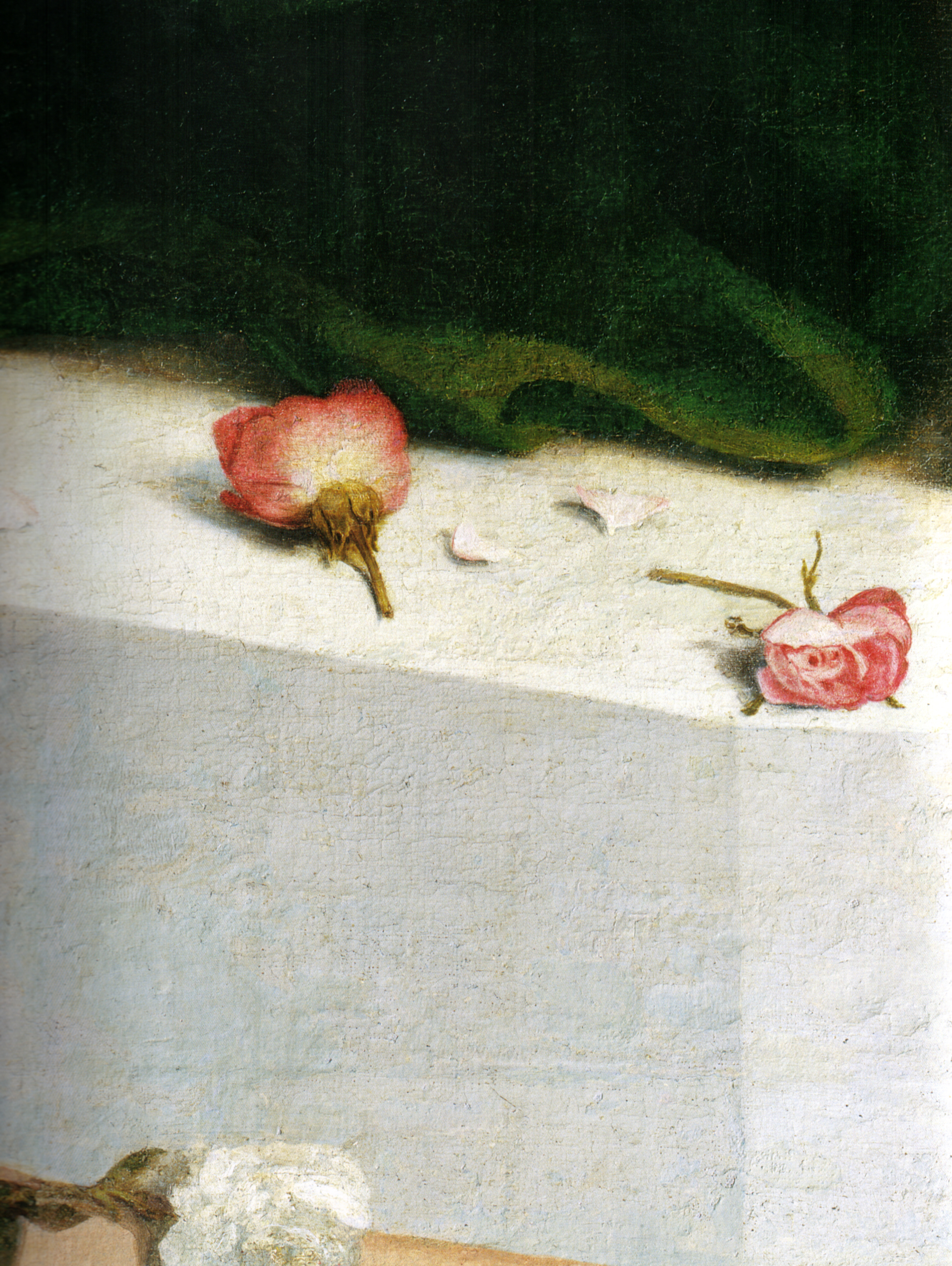
Detail

== See also ==
- Saint Bernardino of Siena (El Greco)
