= Pizzo Lucendro =

Mountain in Switzerland

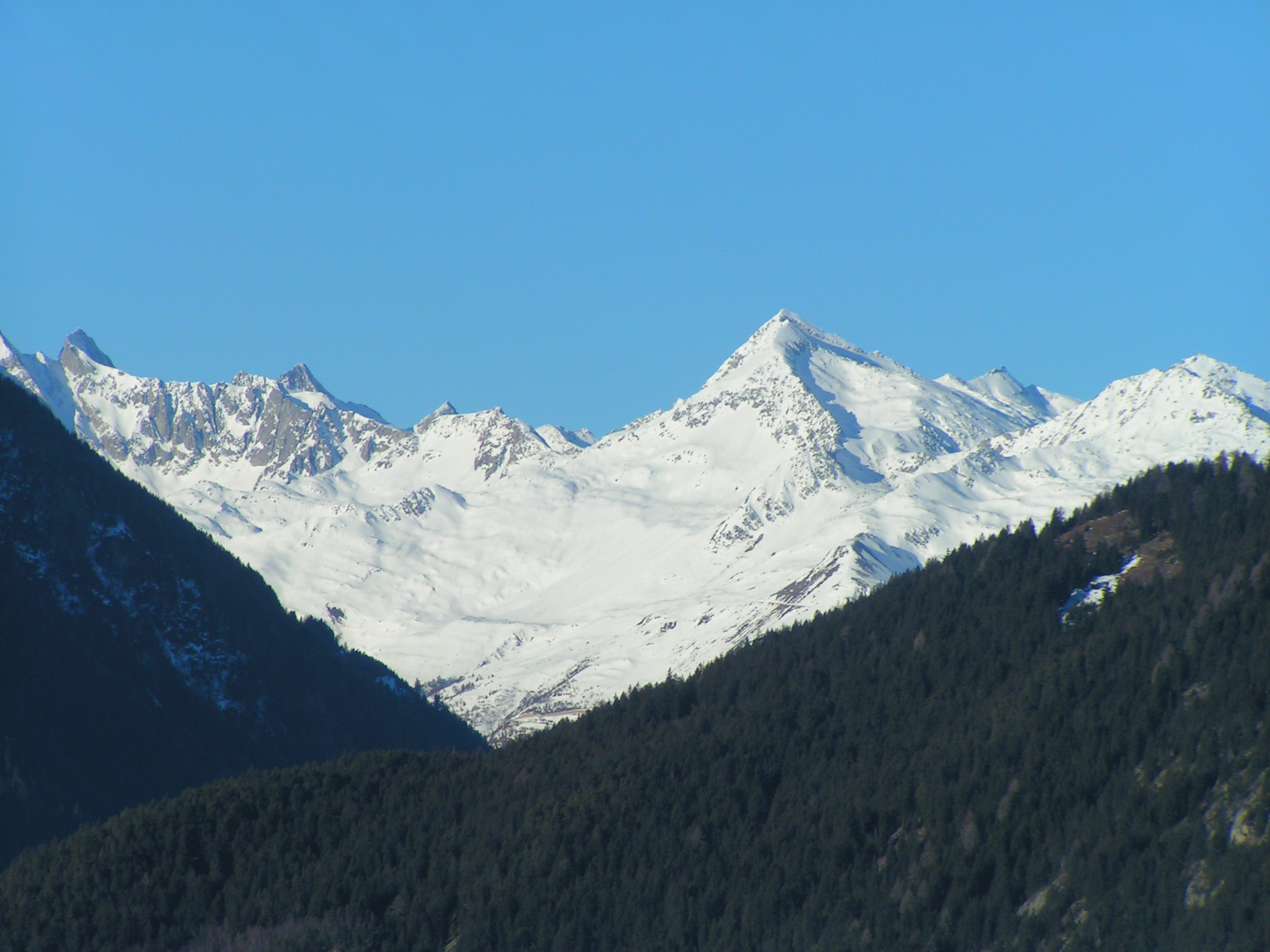
- Pizzo Lucendro from the Leventina

Highest point
- Elevation: 2,963 m (9,721 ft)
- Prominence: 350 m (1,150 ft)
- Parent peak: Pizzo Rotondo
- Coordinates: 46°32′20″N 8°31′10″E

Geography
- Location within Switzerland
- Location: Switzerland
- Parent range: Lepontine Alps

Pizzo Lucendro is a 2,963-metre-high (9,721 ft) mountain in the Lepontine Alps, located on the border between the cantons of Uri and Ticino. It overlooks St. Gotthard Pass and Lake Lucendro on its east side.
