= Daniele Gottardo =

Italian guitarist and composer

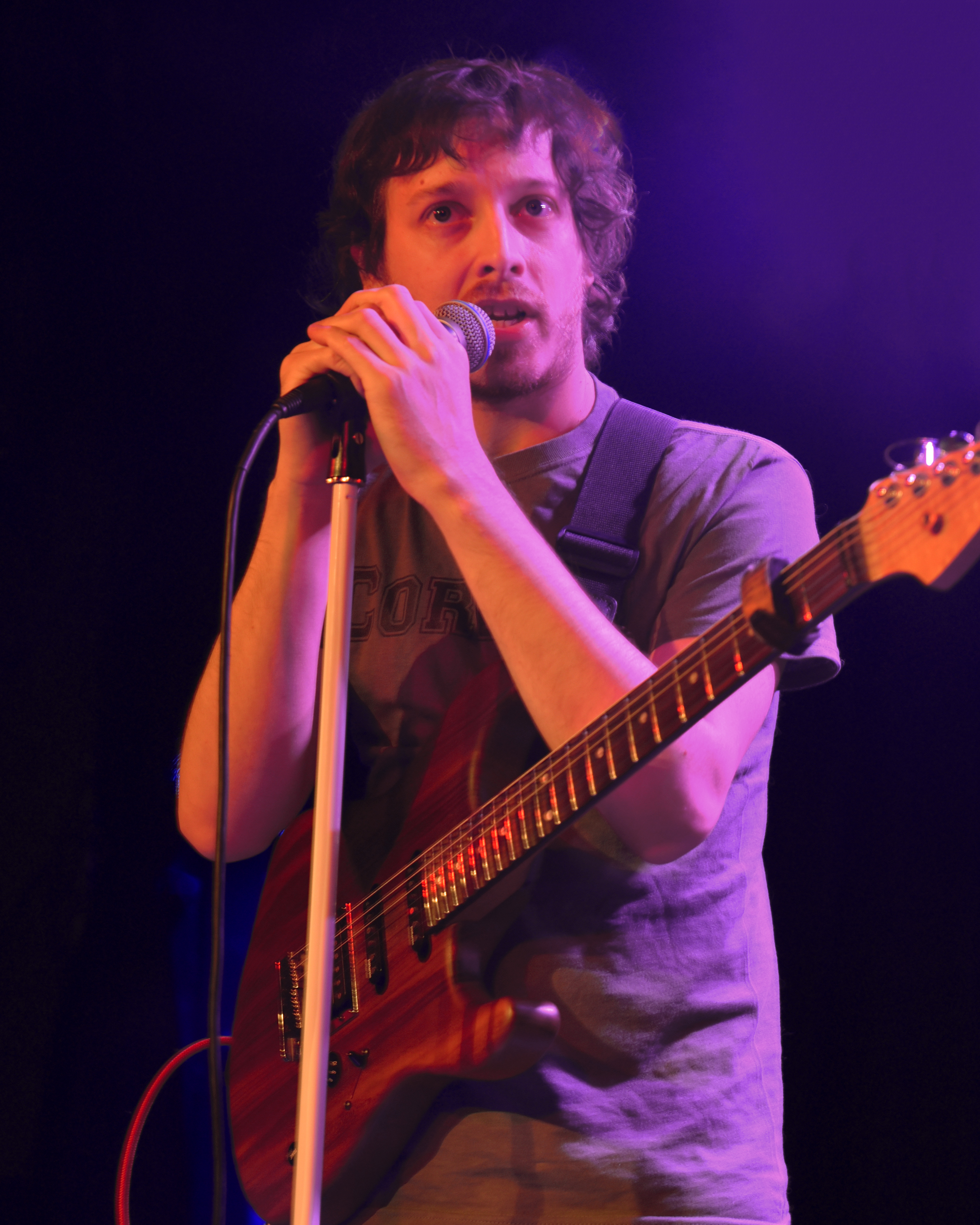
- Daniele Gottardo Performs at the Roxy 2019

Background information
- Born: Daniele Gottardo
- Genres: Instrumental rock, Classical rock, Rock-Fusion
- Occupation: Guitarist
- Instrument: Electric Guitar
- Website: www.officialdanielegottardo.com

Daniele Gottardo is an Italian guitarist and composer. He received recognition in 2009 as a finalist of Guitar Idol, an international guitar competition. Gottardo was mentioned by Steve Vai as one of the brightest talents in modern electric guitar. As a solo artist, he has released three albums, Frenzy of Ecstasy (2010, Digital Nations), Non Temperato (2014), and INkBlot (2022). He is also a music educator for Jamtrackcentral. In 2018 he was mentioned in the article "10 Contemporary Guitar Virtuosos You Need To Hear" by the British magazine Guitarist. He has performed in major international guitar festivals including Malibu Guitar Festival (USA, 2017), Guitare En Scene (France, 2016), Ziua Chitarelor (Romania, 2016), Jason Becker Not Dead Yet Festival (Holland, 2013), Eddie Lang Jazz Festival (Italy, 2010, 2013, 2015).

== Personal life ==
Gottardo is married to guitar player and composer Gretchen Menn.

== Discography ==
As a solo artist:

- Frenzy Of Ecstasy (2010)
- Non Temperato (2014)
- INkBlot (2022)

The Nuts:

- Giant Nuts (2016)

Other appearances:

- Triumphant Hearts - Jason Becker (2019)
- Abandon All Hope - Gretchen Menn (2016)

Instructional DVDs and online courses:

- Il Tapping (Playgame Music, (2005)
- Superfingering (Hudson Music, 2011)
- Ultimate Tapping Masterclass (JamTrackCentral, (2017)
- 20 Licks to Expand Your Jazz Blues (JamTrackCentral)
- 20 Outside Fusion Licks (JamTrackCentral) (18)

== Equipment ==
Gottardo collaborates with Charvel Guitars, Two-Rock amplification, Gruv Gear Eminence Speakers.
