= Tremola San Gottardo =

Cobbled mountain road in Switzerland

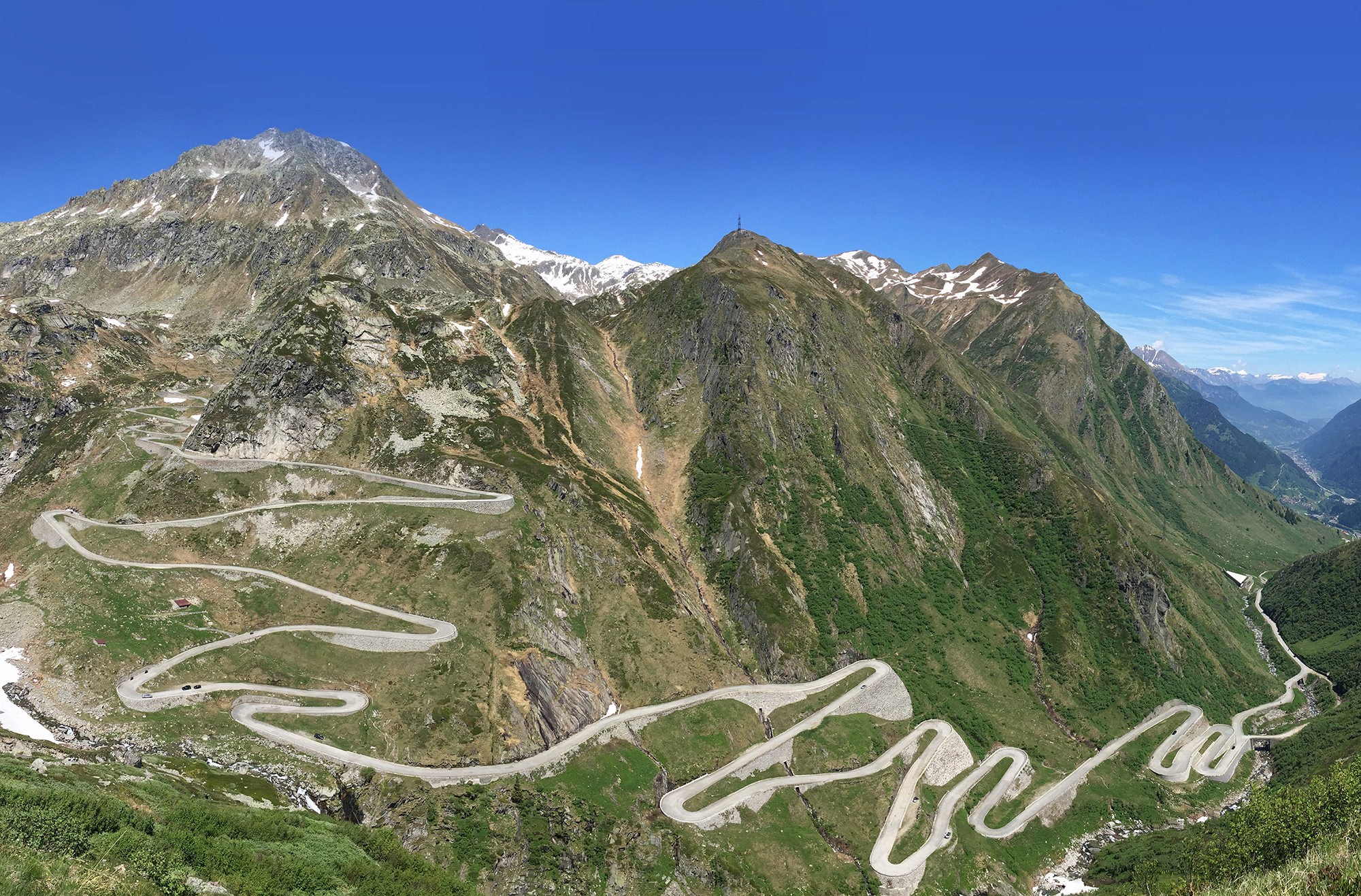
The old road to the Gotthard Pass

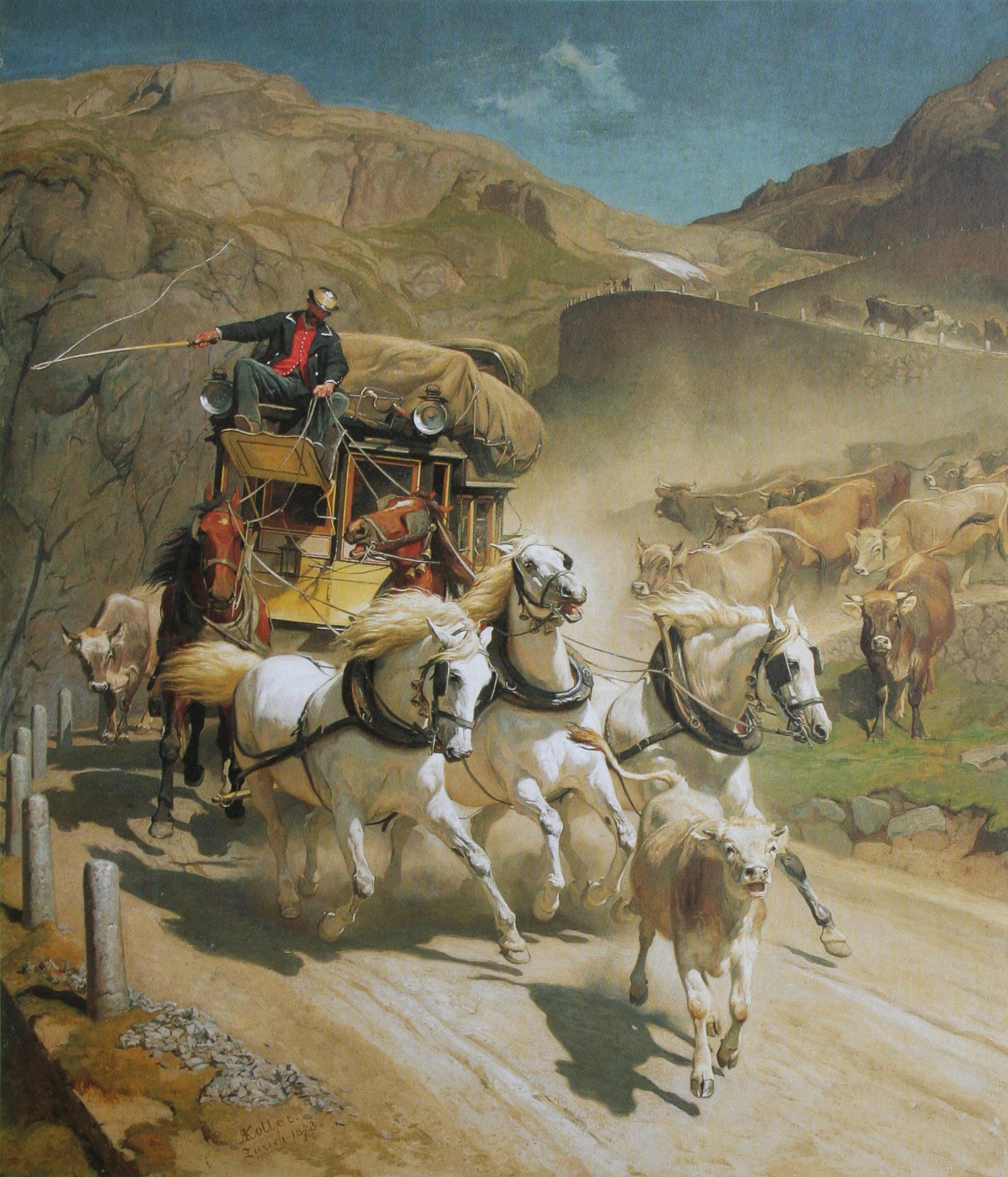
The Gotthard Post on the Tremola (1873 by Rudolf Koller)

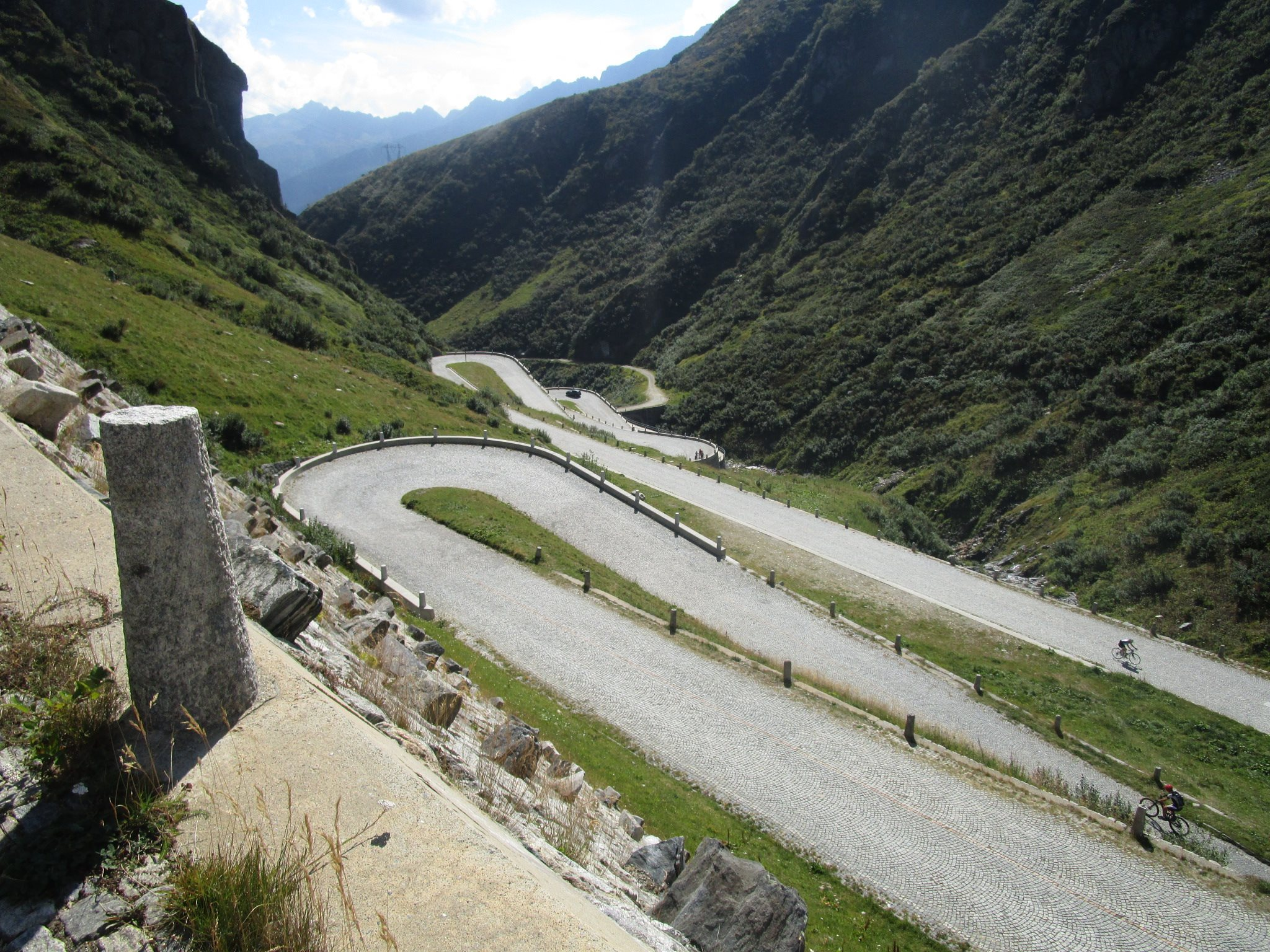
Tremola cobbled surface

The Tremola San Gottardo, located in the Canton of Ticino, is the longest road monument in Switzerland and is listed in the inventory of the historic Swiss roads (IVS). It connects the municipality of Airolo (1175 m a.s.l.) to the Gotthard Pass (2106 m a.s.l.).

One of the highest paved roads in Europe, located on the west side of the Val Tremola, it was constructed with the opening of the roadway of the Gotthard Pass. In its most important stretch, over a length of four kilometers it climbs a height of 300 meters in 24 hairpin bends.

== History ==
The road between Göschenen and Airolo was built between 1827 and 1832 on the design of the engineer Francesco Meschini as part of the works began in 1810 to widen the road between Basel and Chiasso.

The Tremola San Gottardo appears today as it was in 1951. The road is six to seven meters wide and flanked by supporting walls, some up to eight meters high. It preserves a part of the old dry-stone walls, a substantial part of the granite paving, as well as the stone markers. The two roadman's houses are no longer there. The first was located at the entrance to the Val Tremola and was demolished in 1989. The second one was located higher up the road, under Voltone. It was destroyed by an avalanche in 1874 and in view of the imminent opening of the Gotthard Railway Tunnel, in 1882, it was not rebuilt.

== See also ==
- List of highest paved roads in Europe
- List of highest paved roads in Switzerland
- List of mountain passes
- List of the highest Swiss passes
- Gotthard Tunnel
- Gotthard of Hildesheim
- Saint-Gotthard Massif
