= Lago della Sella =

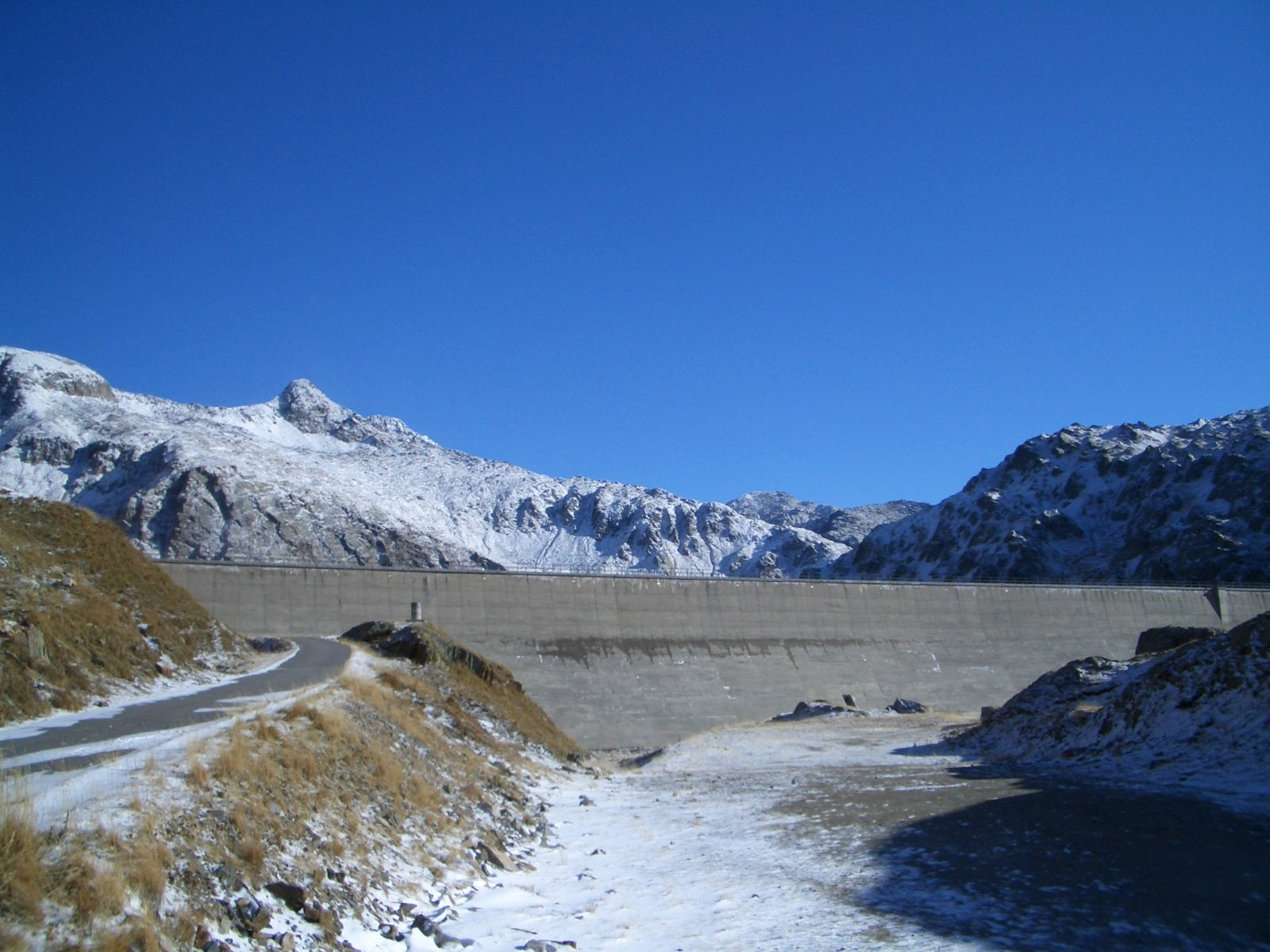
- Sella dam

- Location within Canton of Ticino Location within Canton of Uri Location within Switzerland Location within Alps
- Interactive map of Lago della Sella
- Location: Ticino
- Coordinates: 46.5635°N 8.5987°E
- Type: natural lake, reservoir
- Basin countries: Switzerland
- Surface area: 45 ha (110 acres)
- Max. depth: 30 m (98 ft)
- Surface elevation: 2,256 m (7,402 ft)

Lago della Sella is a reservoir near St. Gotthard Pass in the canton of Ticino, Switzerland. The gravity dam with a height of 36 m was completed in 1947.

The dam was planned and built under control of the Swiss engineer Fritz Gigax.

== See also ==
- List of lakes of Switzerland
- List of mountain lakes of Switzerland
