= San Gottardo Altarpiece =

c. 1520 painting by Giovanni Cariani

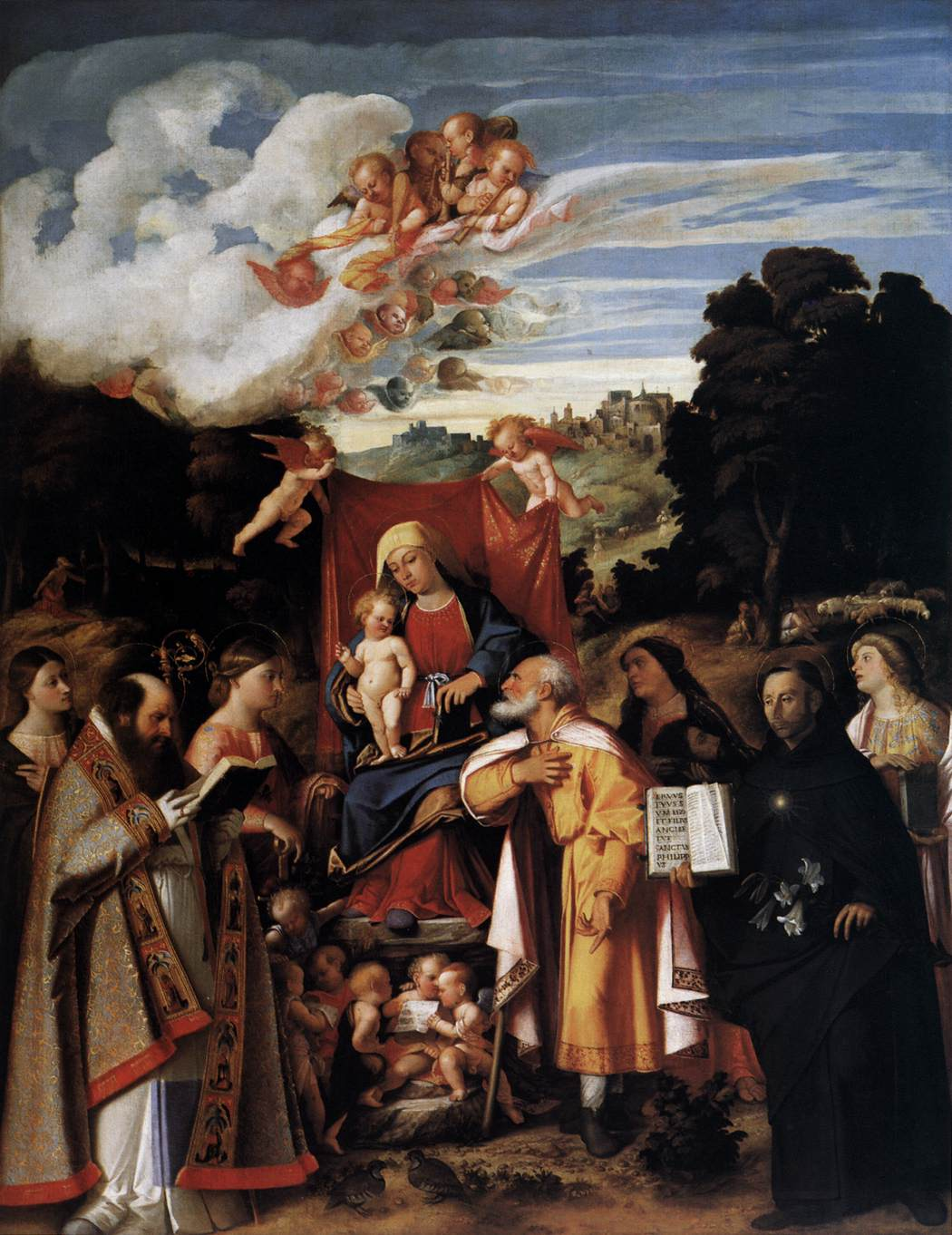
San Gottardo Altarpiece (c. 1517–1518) by Giovanni Cariani

The San Gottardo Altarpiece is an oil on canvas painting by the Italian Renaissance painter Giovanni Cariani, previously dated to 1520 but now thought to have been begun in 1517 and completed in 1518. This made it perhaps his first major work and certainly the first work he produced in Bergamo after arriving there on 15 August 1517. St Joseph was the city's patron saint. The painting was commissioned as an altarpiece by the council of the Scuola di san Giuseppe for the church of San Gottardo. There was tension between the commissioners and the artist and – instead of Cariani – they opted for Lorenzo Lotto and Previtali for the larger works in the church.

The painting was taken out of the church when it was suppressed and demolished under the Napoleonic regime. The main work and its predella of the Flight into Egypt were both in the palazzo Nuovo in Bergamo in 1803, when the latter was sold for 80 francs to Giuseppe Sonzogno and later entered a private collection and then the Accademia Carrara. The main work entered its present home in the Pinacoteca di Brera in Milan in 1805.
