= Sigriswil =

- Municipality
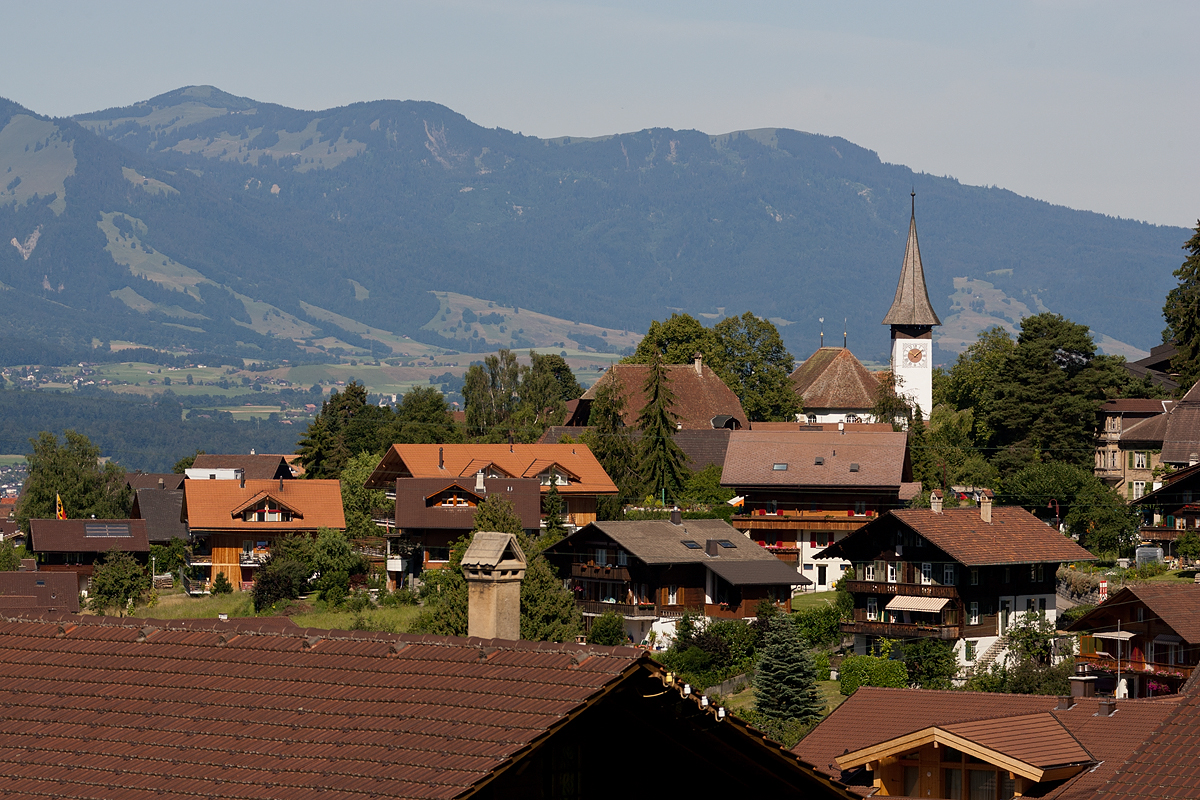
- Sigriswil village

- Flag Coat of arms
- Location of Sigriswil
- Location within Switzerland Location within Canton of Bern
- Coordinates: 46°43′N 7°43′E
- Country: Switzerland
- Canton: Bern
- District: Thun

Government
  - Mayor: Alfred Santschi

Area
  - Total: 55.34 km^{2} (21.37 sq mi)
- Elevation: 810 m (2,660 ft)

Population (Dec 2012)
  - Total: 4,679
  - Density: 84.55/km^{2} (219.0/sq mi)
- Time zone: UTC+01:00 (CET)
  - Summer (DST): UTC+02:00 (CEST)
- Postal code: 3655
- SFOS number: 938
- ISO 3166 code: CH-BE
- Localities: 11 villages (Aeschlen ob Gunten, Gunten, Meiersmaad, Merligen, Ringoldswil, Schwanden, Sigriswil, Tschingel ob Gunten, Wiler, Endorf, Reust); Justistal
- Surrounded by: Beatenberg, Heiligenschwendi, Horrenbach-Buchen, Krattigen, Leissigen, Oberhofen am Thunersee, Spiez, Teuffenthal
- Twin towns: Lutry (Switzerland), Villa General Belgrano (Argentina)
- Website: www.sigriswil.ch

Sigriswil is a municipality in the administrative district of Thun in the canton of Bern in Switzerland.

== History ==
Sigriswil church

Soldiers relaxing in Sigriswil between 1914 and 1918

Sigriswil is first mentioned in 1222-23 as Sigriswile.

Archeological remains dating from the Late Neolithic and Bronze Age show that the area around Sigriswil has been inhabited as early as 5000 years ago. It's thought that the first modern inhabitants can be traced back to Alamanni tribesmen who settled on the banks of Thun lake around the 5th Century A.D., later moving on up into the higher elevations around the modern village of Sigriswil between the 8-10th century. The village church of St. Gallus was first mentioned in 1222-23 in the Strättliger Chronicle as one of the twelve churches around Lake Thun. However, it was probably built during the 10th to 12th centuries. The patronage rights over the church and the Justistal settlement and alpine meadow were given to Interlaken Monastery in the 13th century.

In 1347, the inhabitants of Sigriswil were able to buy their independence in the Castle of Thun from Count Eberhard (a member of the Kyburg dynasty who had fallen on hard financial times) for the sum of 300 "Pfund Thuner Pfennige" (300 pounds of 'Thun Pennies'). By 1384, Bern ruled over the municipality, though the citizens of Sigriswil were able to govern themselves.

In 1467 the old church was demolished and a new parish church was built. In 1528 Bern adopted the new faith of the Protestant Reformation and suppressed all monasteries, including Interlaken Monastery. The patronage right over the church transferred to Bern, while Justistal became part of the municipality. In 1678-79 the second church was demolished and the current church was built.

Following the 1798 French invasion, Sigriswil became part of the newly created Canton of Oberland in the Helvetic Republic. After the collapse of the Republic and 1803 Act of Mediation it rejoined the Canton of Bern in the newly created Thun District.

Traditionally the villagers of Sigriswil fished in Lake Thun, raised crops and vineyards on the valley floor and raised cattle in the summer in high alpine meadows before bringing them down for winter. By 1914 a combination of disease, competition from imported wine and the looming World War destroyed the wine industry in the municipality. During the late 19th and early 20th century steam boats and improved roads began bringing tourists to the municipality. Hotels and restaurants opened along the lake shore and on the slopes. The first class hotels settled along the lake shore, while small chalets and vacation homes developed in the mountain valleys and terraces. Today, Sigriswil is a tranquil alpine farming village as well as a popular tourist resort.

US statistician George Gallup had a summer residence in Tschingel ob Gunten. He died of a heart attack in 1984 at his residence.

== Geography ==
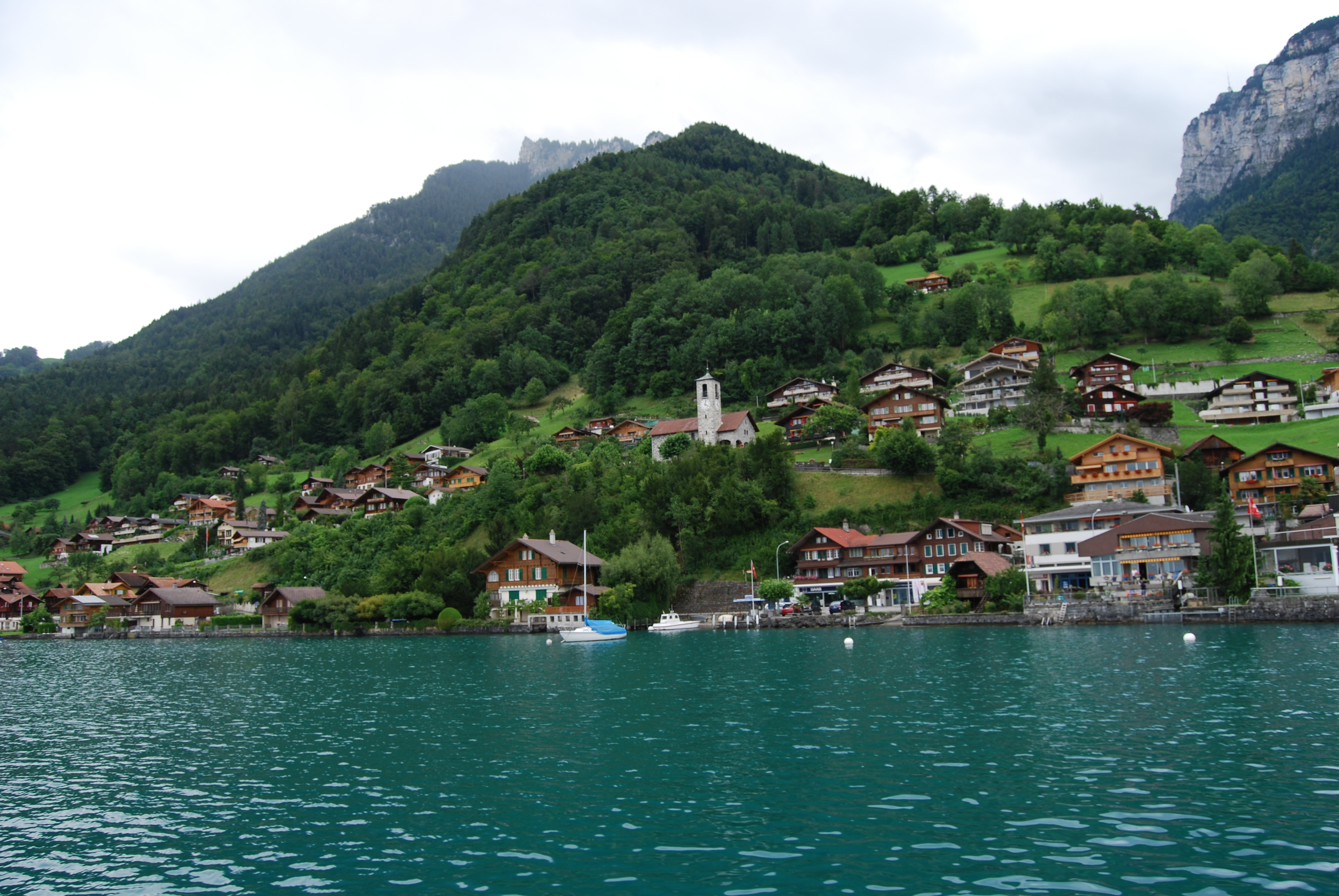
Merligen (Sigriswil)

Aerial view (1952)

Sigriswil has an area of 55.41 km^{2} (21.39 sq mi). As of the 2004/06 survey, a total of 21.76 km^{2} (8.40 mi^{2}) or 39.3% is used for agricultural purposes, while 26.1 km^{2} (10.1 mi^{2}) or 47.1% is forested. Of rest of the municipality 2.6 km^{2} (1.0 mi^{2}) or 4.7% is settled (buildings or roads), 0.28 km^{2} (0.11 mi^{2}) or 0.5% is either rivers or lakes and 4.62 km^{2} (1.78 mi^{2}) or 8.3% is unproductive land.

From the same survey, housing and buildings made up 2.6% and transportation infrastructure made up 1.8%. A total of 41.9% of the total land area is heavily forested and 3.8% is covered with orchards or small clusters of trees. Of the agricultural land, 16.5% is pasturage and 21.8% is used for alpine pastures. All the water in the municipality is flowing water. Of the unproductive areas, 4.2% is unproductive vegetation and 4.2% is too rocky for vegetation.

The municipality is spreads over lakes and mountains along the right bank of Lake Thun. It includes the watershed of the Zulg river and the Güggisgrat and Sigriswilgrat mountain ranges. It consists of eleven villages (Gunten, Merligen am See, Aeschlen, Sigriswil, Endorf, Ringoldswil, Tschingel, Schwanden, Meiersmaad, Reust and Justistal) as well as scattered hamlets.

On 31 December 2009 Amtsbezirk Thun, the municipality's former district, was dissolved. On the following day, 1 January 2010, it joined the newly created Verwaltungskreis Thun.

== Coat of arms ==
The blazon of the municipal coat of arms is Gules a Grape Tub Argent hooped Or filled with Grapes Azure leaved Vert on a Mount of 3 Coupeaux of the last.

== Demographics ==
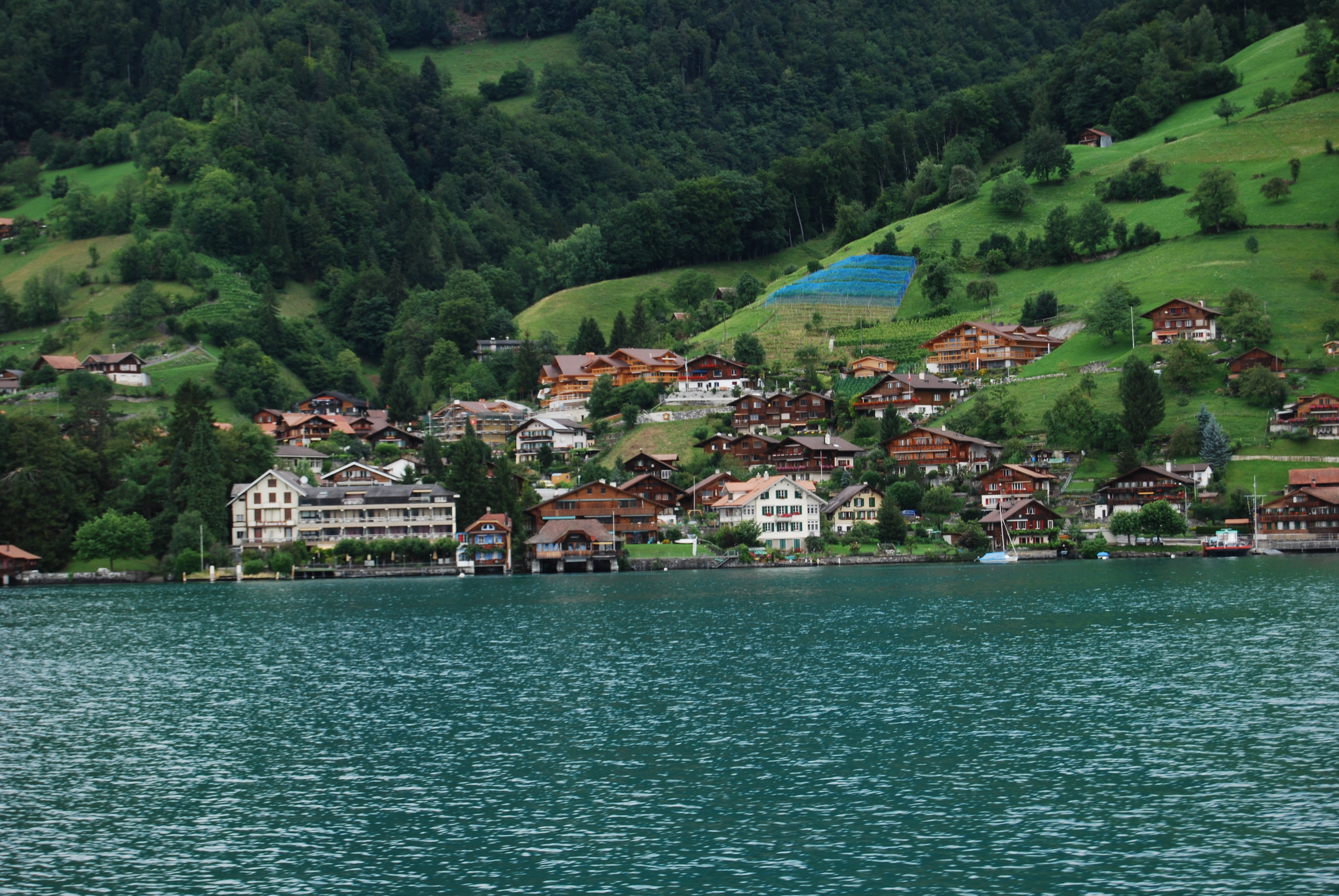
Merligen village along Lake Thun

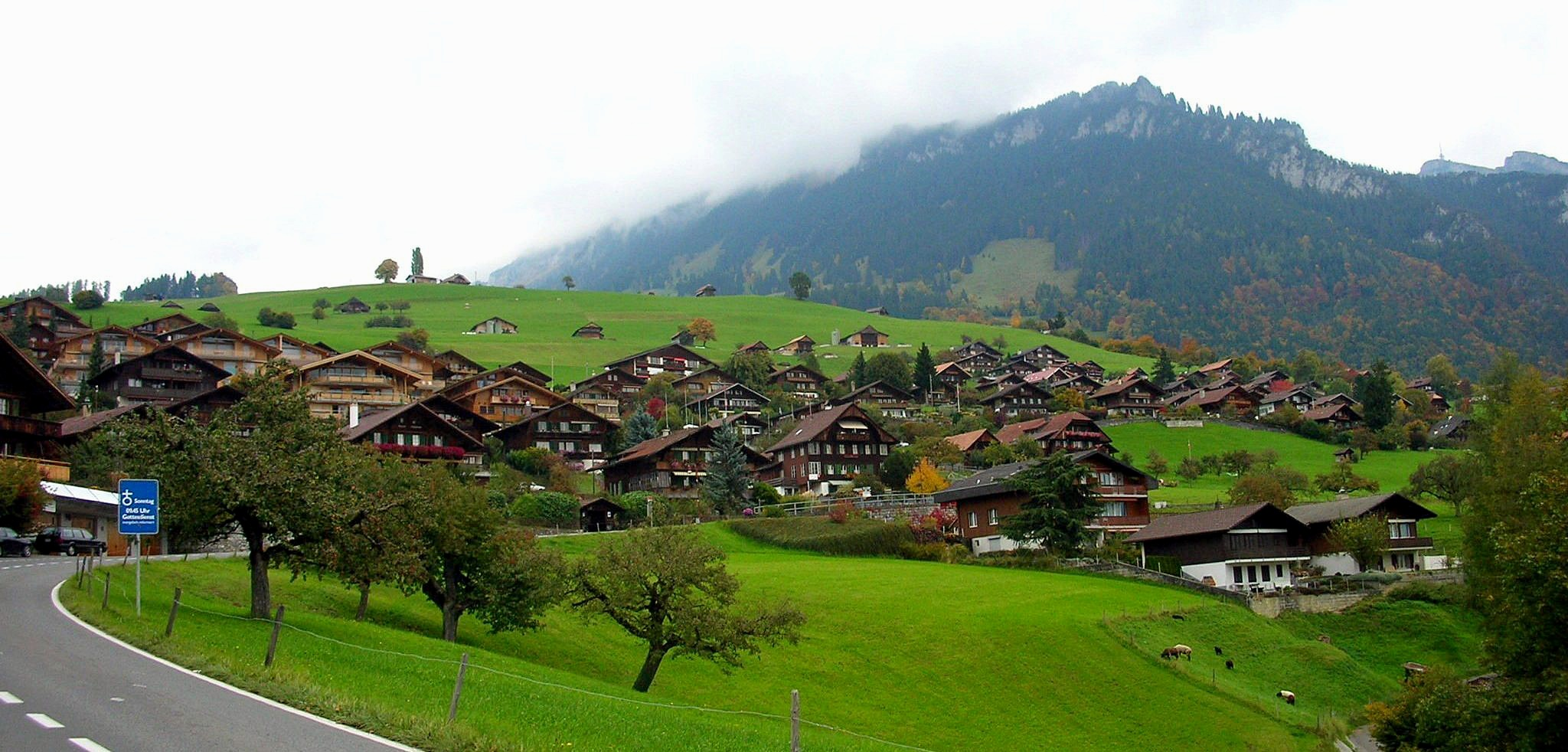
Houses in the mountains in Sigriswil

Sigriswil has a population (as of December 2020) of 4,847. As of 2012, 10.1% of the population are resident foreign nationals. Between the last 2 years (2010-2012) the population changed at a rate of 1.8%. Migration accounted for 2.2%, while births and deaths accounted for -1.2%.

Most of the population (as of 2000) speaks German (4,272 or 95.0%) as their first language, Portuguese is the second most common (41 or 0.9%) and French is the third (31 or 0.7%). There are 12 people who speak Italian and 4 people who speak Romansh.

As of 2008, the population was 48.2% male and 51.8% female. The population was made up of 1,989 Swiss men (43.3% of the population) and 228 (5.0%) non-Swiss men. There were 2,163 Swiss women (47.0%) and 218 (4.7%) non-Swiss women. Of the population in the municipality, 1,851 or about 41.2% were born in Sigriswil and lived there in 2000. There were 1,420 or 31.6% who were born in the same canton, while 606 or 13.5% were born somewhere else in Switzerland, and 441 or 9.8% were born outside of Switzerland.

As of 2012, children and teenagers (0–19 years old) make up 15.9% of the population, while adults (20–64 years old) make up 56.5% and seniors (over 64 years old) make up 27.6%.

As of 2000, there were 1,677 people who were single and never married in the municipality. There were 2,191 married individuals, 402 widows or widowers and 226 individuals who are divorced.

As of 2010, there were 799 households that consist of only one person and 113 households with five or more people. In 2000, a total of 1,833 apartments (67.3% of the total) were permanently occupied, while 723 apartments (26.5%) were seasonally occupied and 169 apartments (6.2%) were empty. As of 2012, the construction rate of new housing units was 5.6 new units per 1000 residents. The vacancy rate for the municipality, in 2013, was 0.4%. In 2012, single family homes made up 34.8% of the total housing in the municipality.

The historical population is given in the following chart:

== Economy ==
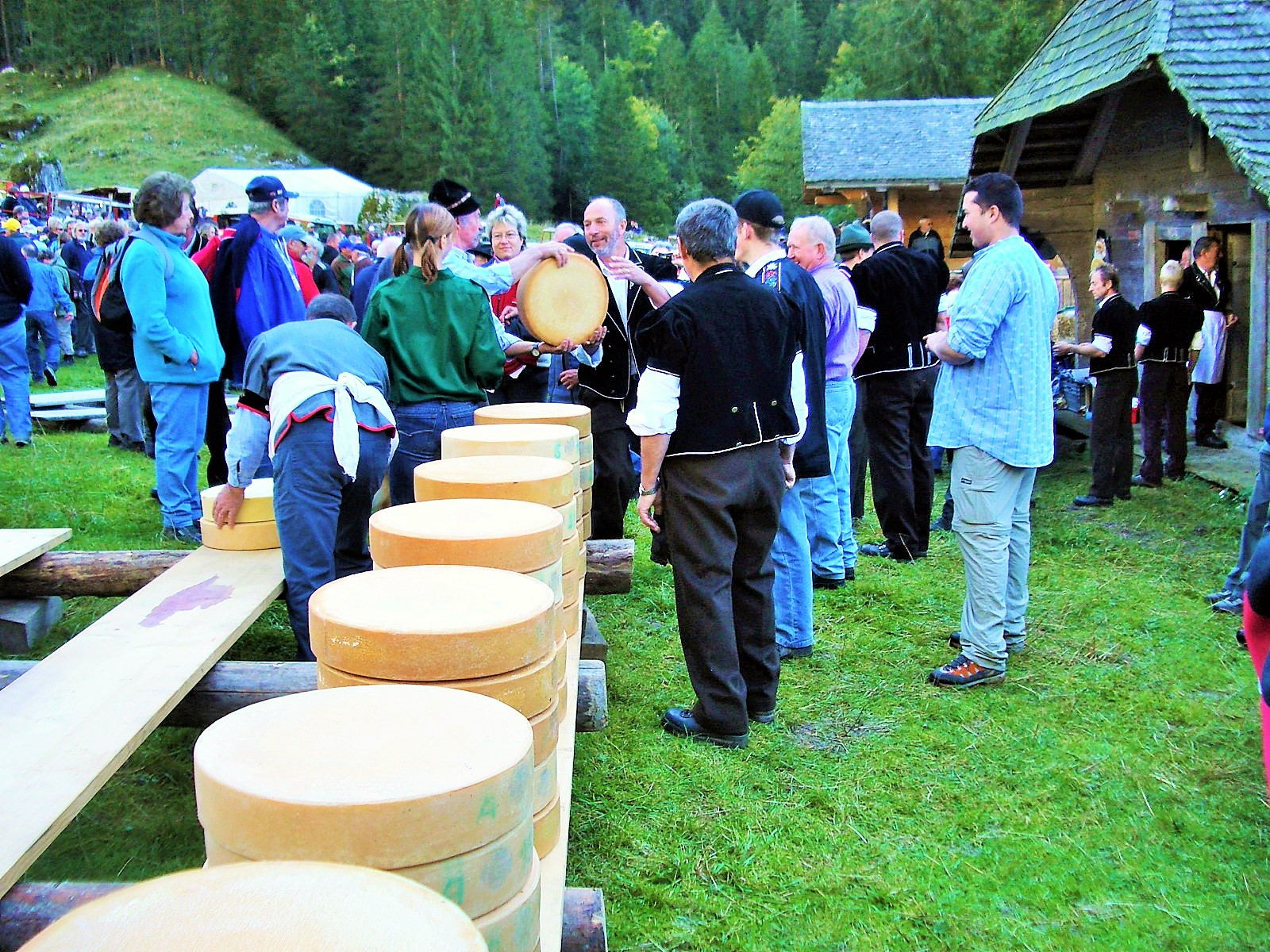
The annual Käseteilet (Cheese sharing) in Justistal to celebrate the end of summer and heading to the valleys to over-winter cattle.

As of 2011, Sigriswil had an unemployment rate of 1.5%. As of 2011, there were a total of 1,639 people employed in the municipality. Of these, there were 333 people employed in the primary economic sector and about 122 businesses involved in this sector. The secondary sector employs 167 people and there were 63 businesses in this sector. The tertiary sector employs 1,138 people, with 211 businesses in this sector. There were 2,177 residents of the municipality who were employed in some capacity, of which females made up 41.8% of the workforce.

In 2008 there were a total of 1,172 full-time equivalent jobs. The number of jobs in the primary sector was 201, of which 182 were in agriculture, 14 were in forestry or lumber production and 5 were in fishing or fisheries. The number of jobs in the secondary sector was 125 of which 35 or (28.0%) were in manufacturing and 75 (60.0%) were in construction. The number of jobs in the tertiary sector was 846. In the tertiary sector; 86 or 10.2% were in wholesale or retail sales or the repair of motor vehicles, 33 or 3.9% were in the movement and storage of goods, 280 or 33.1% were in a hotel or restaurant, 28 or 3.3% were technical professionals or scientists, 26 or 3.1% were in education and 311 or 36.8% were in health care.

In 2000, there were 372 workers who commuted into the municipality and 1,159 workers who commuted away. The municipality is a net exporter of workers, with about 3.1 workers leaving the municipality for every one entering. A total of 1,018 workers (73.2% of the 1,390 total workers in the municipality) both lived and worked in Sigriswil. Of the working population, 14% used public transportation to get to work, and 54.2% used a private car.

The local and cantonal tax rate in Sigriswil is one of the lowest in the canton. In 2012 the average local and cantonal tax rate on a married resident, with two children, of Sigriswil making 150,000 CHF was 12.1%, while an unmarried resident's rate was 18%. For comparison, the average rate for the entire canton in 2011, was 14.2% and 22.0%, while the nationwide average was 12.3% and 21.1% respectively.

In 2010 there were a total of 2,064 tax payers in the municipality. Of that total, 598 made over 75,000 CHF per year. There were 27 people who made between 15,000 and 20,000 per year. The greatest number of workers, 619, made between 50,000 and 75,000 CHF per year. The average income of the over 75,000 CHF group in Sigriswil was 119,152 CHF, while the average across all of Switzerland was 131,244 CHF.

In 2011 a total of 0.4% of the population received direct financial assistance from the government.

== Sights ==
The entire hamlet of Wiler is designated as part of the Inventory of Swiss Heritage Sites

Sternwarte Sirius is located at Schwanden.

== Politics ==
In the 2011 federal election the most popular party was the Swiss People's Party (SVP) which received 49.3% of the vote. The next three most popular parties were the Conservative Democratic Party (BDP) (15.1%), the Social Democratic Party (SP) (10.2%) and the FDP.The Liberals (6.0%). In the federal election, a total of 2,163 votes were cast, and the voter turnout was 58.3%.

== Religion ==
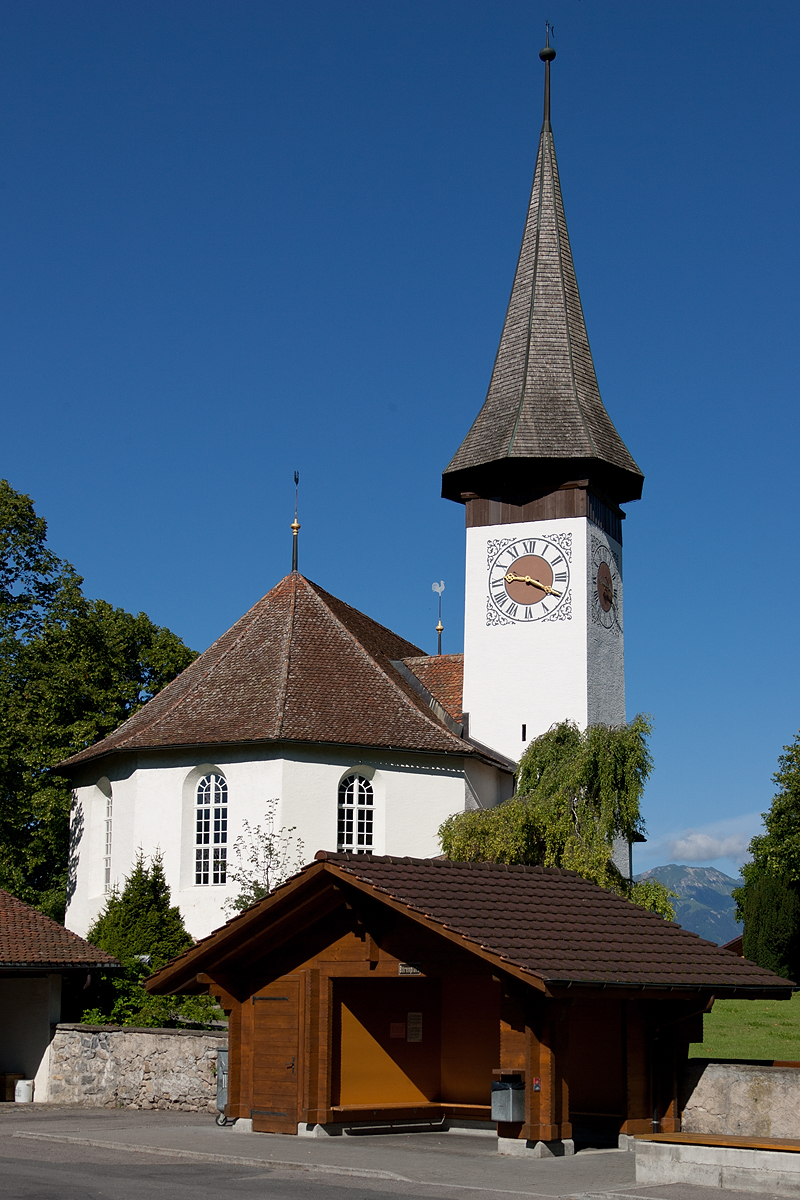
Village church of Sigriswil

From the 2000 census, 3,429 or 76.3% belonged to the Swiss Reformed Church, while 390 or 8.7% were Roman Catholic. Of the rest of the population, there were 27 members of an Orthodox church (or about 0.60% of the population), there were 6 individuals (or about 0.13% of the population) who belonged to the Christian Catholic Church, and there were 136 individuals (or about 3.02% of the population) who belonged to another Christian church. There were 2 individuals (or about 0.04% of the population) who were Jewish, and 51 (or about 1.13% of the population) who were Muslim. There were 8 individuals who were Buddhist, 6 individuals who were Hindu and 2 individuals who belonged to another church. 295 (or about 6.56% of the population) belonged to no church, are agnostic or atheist, and 144 individuals (or about 3.20% of the population) did not answer the question.

== Education ==
In Sigriswil about 57.6% of the population have completed non-mandatory upper secondary education, and 16.6% have completed additional higher education (either university or a Fachhochschule). Of the 496 who had completed some form of tertiary schooling listed in the census, 64.9% were Swiss men, 20.2% were Swiss women, 9.1% were non-Swiss men and 5.8% were non-Swiss women.

The Canton of Bern school system provides one year of non-obligatory Kindergarten, followed by six years of Primary school. This is followed by three years of obligatory lower Secondary school where the students are separated according to ability and aptitude. Following the lower Secondary students may attend additional schooling or they may enter an apprenticeship.

During the 2012-13 school year, there were a total of 360 students attending classes in Sigriswil. Of the original 10 schools (in 11 communities), only 7 primary schools are still active. The only secondary school is in Sigriswil village. There were a total of 51 students in the German language kindergarten classes in the municipality. Of the kindergarten students, 15.7% were permanent or temporary residents of Switzerland (not citizens) and 15.7% have a different mother language than the classroom language. The municipality's primary school had 202 students in German language classes. Of the primary students, 9.9% were permanent or temporary residents of Switzerland (not citizens) and 6.9% have a different mother language than the classroom language. During the same year, the lower secondary school had a total of 107 students. There were 2.8% who were permanent or temporary residents of Switzerland (not citizens) and 2.8% have a different mother language than the classroom language.

As of 2000, there were a total of 374 students attending any school in the municipality. Of those, 373 both lived and attended school in the municipality, while one student came from another municipality. During the same year, 117 residents attended schools outside the municipality.

Sigriswil is home to the Gemeindebibliothek Sigriswil (municipal library of Sigriswil). The library has (as of 2008) 5,522 books or other media, and loaned out 16,223 items in the same year. It was open a total of 156 days with average of 12 hours per week during that year.

== See also ==
- Schlieregg
