= Interlaken West railway station =

Railway station in Interlaken, Switzerland

Interlaken West
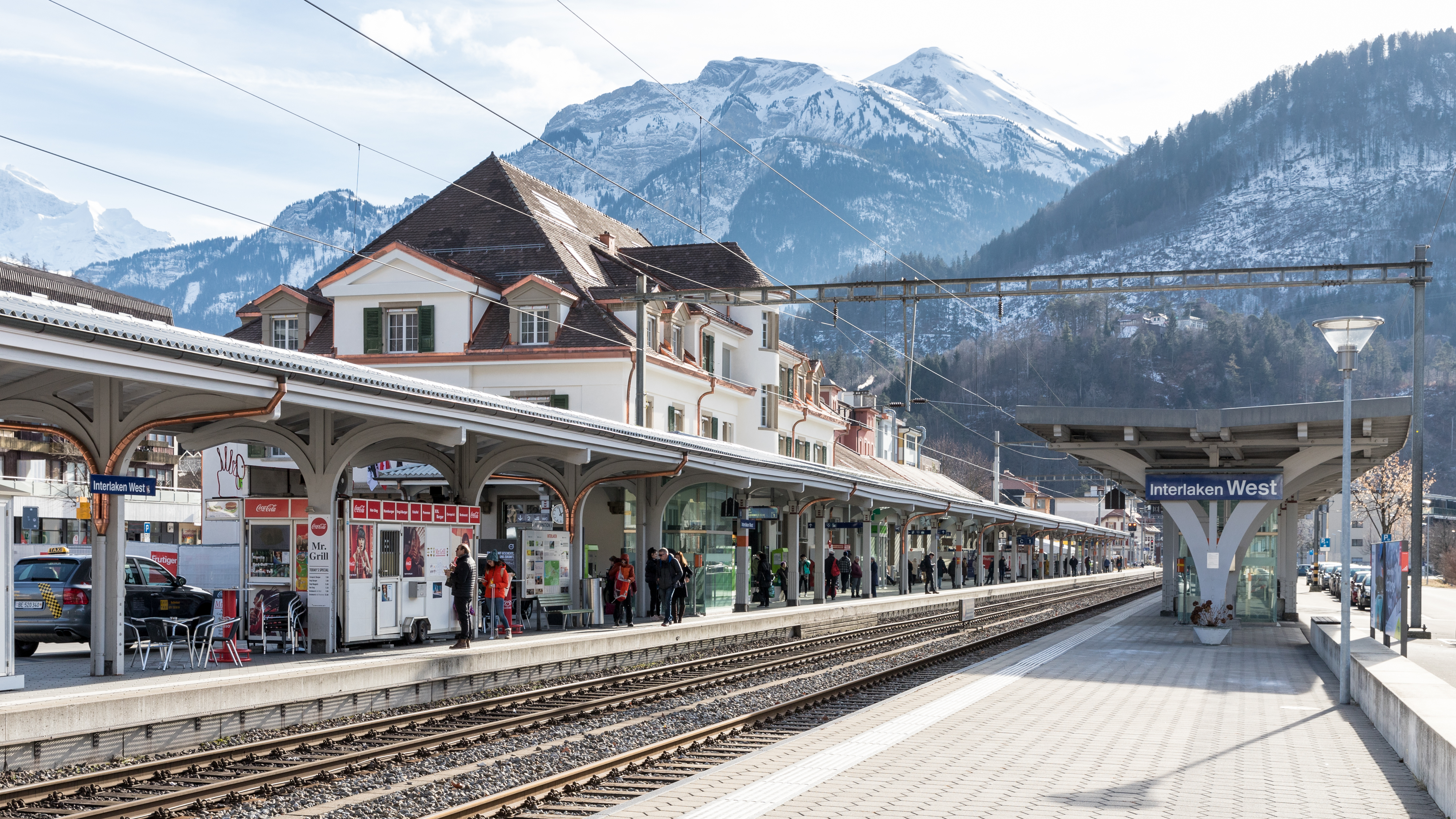
- The station platforms in 2019

General information
- Location: Bahnhofstrasse 28; Interlaken; Switzerland
- Coordinates: 46°40′57″N 7°51′05″E
- Elevation: 563 m (1,847 ft)
- Owner: BLS AG
- Line: Lake Thun line
- Distance: 26.0 km (16.2 mi) from Thun
- Platforms: 2 side platforms
- Tracks: 2
- Train operators: BLS AG; Deutsche Bahn; Swiss Federal Railways
- Connections: PostAuto AG; Verkehrsbetriebe STI; BLS AG on Lake Thun

Construction
- Parking: Yes (61 spaces)
- Accessible: Yes

Other information
- Station code: 8507493 (IW)
- Fare zone: 750 (Libero)

Passengers
- 2023: 6'500 per weekday (BLS, SBB)

Services
Preceding station	BLS	Following station
Spiez Terminus	RE9	Interlaken Ost Terminus
Spiez towards Montreux	GoldenPass Express	Interlaken Ost Terminus
Preceding station	DB Fernverkehr	Following station
Spiez towards Berlin Ostbahnhof	ICE 12	Interlaken Ost Terminus
Preceding station	SBB CFF FFS	Following station
Spiez towards Hamburg-Altona	EuroCity	Interlaken Ost Terminus
Spiez towards Basel SBB	IC 61	Interlaken Ost Terminus
Spiez towards Romanshorn	IC 81	Interlaken Ost Terminus
Location
- Location within Switzerland Location within Canton of Bern

Interlaken West is a railway station in the resort town of Interlaken, in the Swiss canton of Bern. It is on the Thunersee line of the BLS AG, and is one of two stations in the town, the other being Interlaken Ost. In addition to trains operated directly by the BLS, the station is also reached by passenger trains of the Swiss Federal Railways and Deutsche Bahn.

The lines through the station are standard gauge and are electrified at 15 kV AC. There are two tracks, narrowing to a single track at either end of the station, and each track is served by a side platform. The station building is situated on the eastern platform.

The station also provides an interchange with the local bus network provided by PostBus Switzerland and the regional bus line to Thun provided by Verkehrsbetriebe STI. Ships of the BLS-owned fleet on Lake Thun serve a quay at Interlaken West, which they access via the 2.75-kilometre (1.71 mi) long Interlaken ship canal.

== History ==
Originally known simply as Interlaken, Interlaken West was the first station to be opened in the town, when the Bödelibahn railway reached it from Därligen, on Lake Thun in 1872. Two years later the railway was extended to Bönigen, on Lake Brienz, via Interlaken Zollhaus station.

Over time, Zollhaus station became the more important station, being also served by the Brünig railway and the Bernese Oberland railway. As a result, Interlaken station was renamed Interlaken West, and Interlaken Zollhaus was renamed Interlaken Ost.

=== Services ===
As of the December 2024 timetable change, the following services stop at Interlaken West; all eastbound/southbound trains terminate in Interlaken Ost:

- EuroCity / InterCity / Intercity Express (ICE): hourly or better service to Basel SBB. Most northbound trains terminate in Basel; a single EuroCity and an ICE continue to Hamburg-Altona and two ICE continue to Berlin Ostbahnhof.
- InterCity: service every two hours to Romanshorn.
- RegioExpress: service every two hours to Spiez.
- GoldenPass Express: 4 daily round-trips between Montreux and Interlaken Ost.
