= Sulegg =

Mountain in Switzerland

- Höji Sulegg
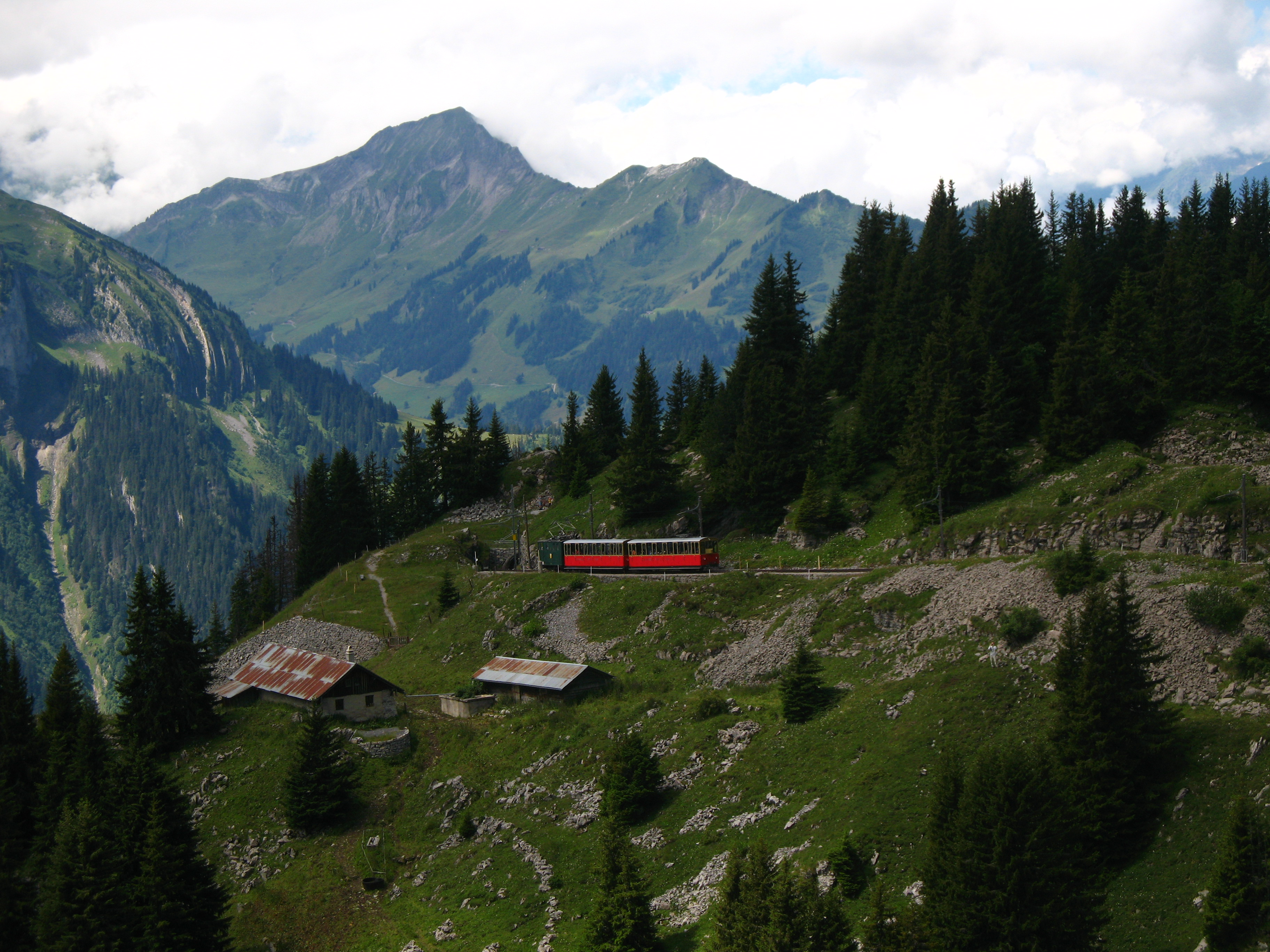
- View toward Sulegg and Bellenhöchst.

Highest point
- Elevation: 2,413 m (7,917 ft)
- Prominence: 103 m (338 ft)
- Coordinates: 46°37′17.4″N 7°51′7.1″E

Geography
- Location within Switzerland
- Location: Bern, Switzerland
- Parent range: Bernese Alps

The Sulegg is a mountain of the Bernese Alps, overlooking Saxeten in the Bernese Oberland. It lies on the group between the Saxettal and the Soustal, on the left side of the Lauterbunnen valley.
