= Schlieregg =

Village in Thun, Berner Oberland, Switzerland

Coordinates: 46.729°N 7.725°E

Schlieregg is a tiny village in Thun, Berner Oberland, Switzerland. It lies in the municipality of Sigriswil, not far from Thunersee.
