= Leissigen =

- Municipality
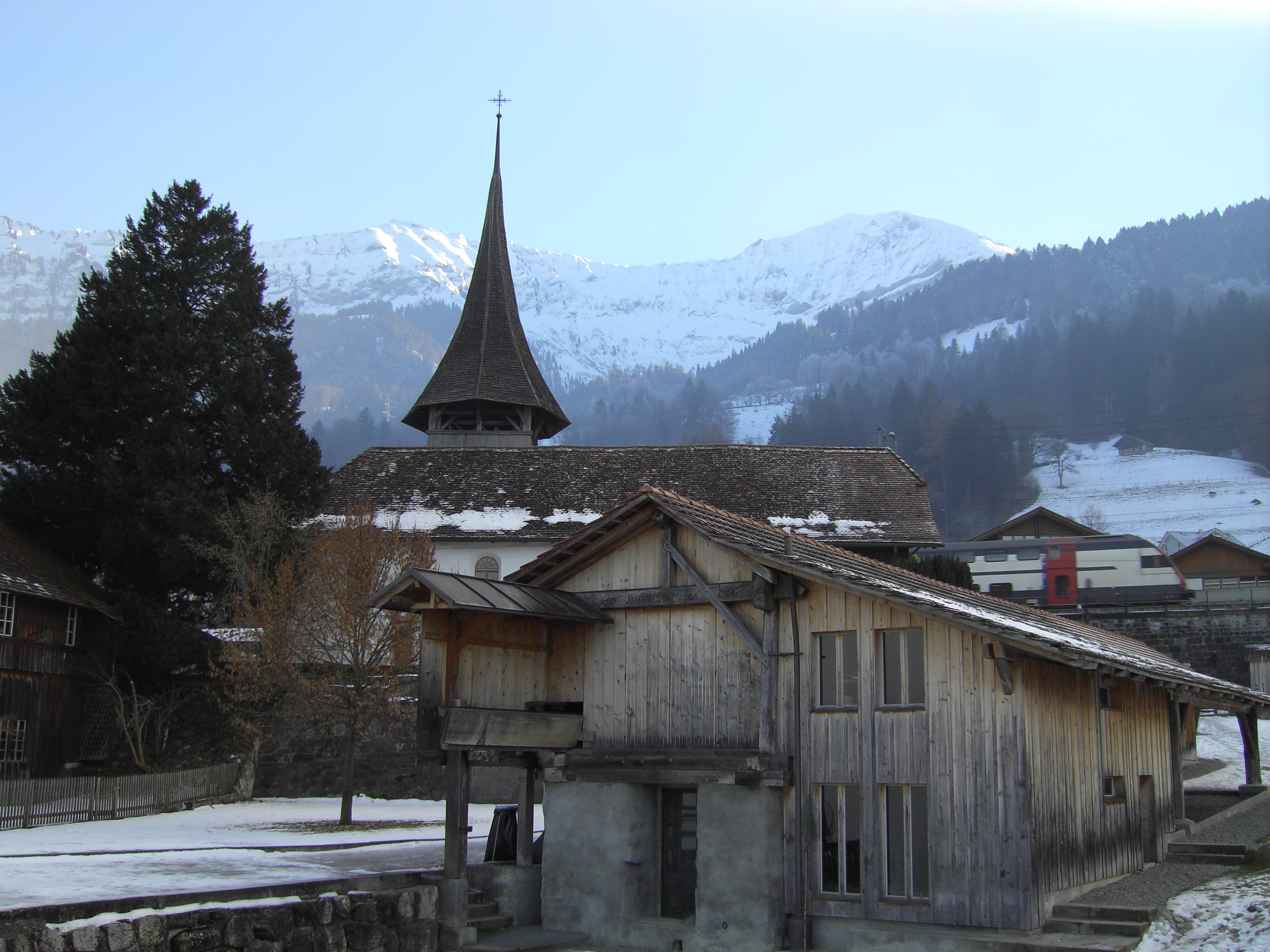
- Leissigen village church and mill

- Flag Coat of arms
- Location of Leissigen
- Location within Switzerland Location within Canton of Bern
- Coordinates: 46°39′N 7°46′E
- Country: Switzerland
- Canton: Bern
- District: Interlaken-Oberhasli

Government
  - Executive: Gemeinderat with 7 members
  - Mayor: Gemeindepräsident(in); Letizia Müller (as of 2026)

Area
  - Total: 10.4 km^{2} (4.0 sq mi)
- Elevation: 575 m (1,886 ft)

Population (December 2020)
  - Total: 1,171
  - Density: 113/km^{2} (292/sq mi)
- Time zone: UTC+01:00 (CET)
  - Summer (DST): UTC+02:00 (CEST)
- Postal code: 3706
- SFOS number: 585
- ISO 3166 code: CH-BE
- Surrounded by: Därligen, Saxeten, Aeschi bei Spiez and Krattigen.
- Website: www.leissigen.ch

Leissigen (German pronunciation: [ˈlaɪsɪɡn̩]) is a municipality in the Interlaken-Oberhasli administrative district in the canton of Bern in Switzerland.

== Origin of the name ==
The name Leissigen comes from the Old High German personal name Lantgis and the toponymic suffix -ingun, meaning "of the people of Langtis."

== History ==
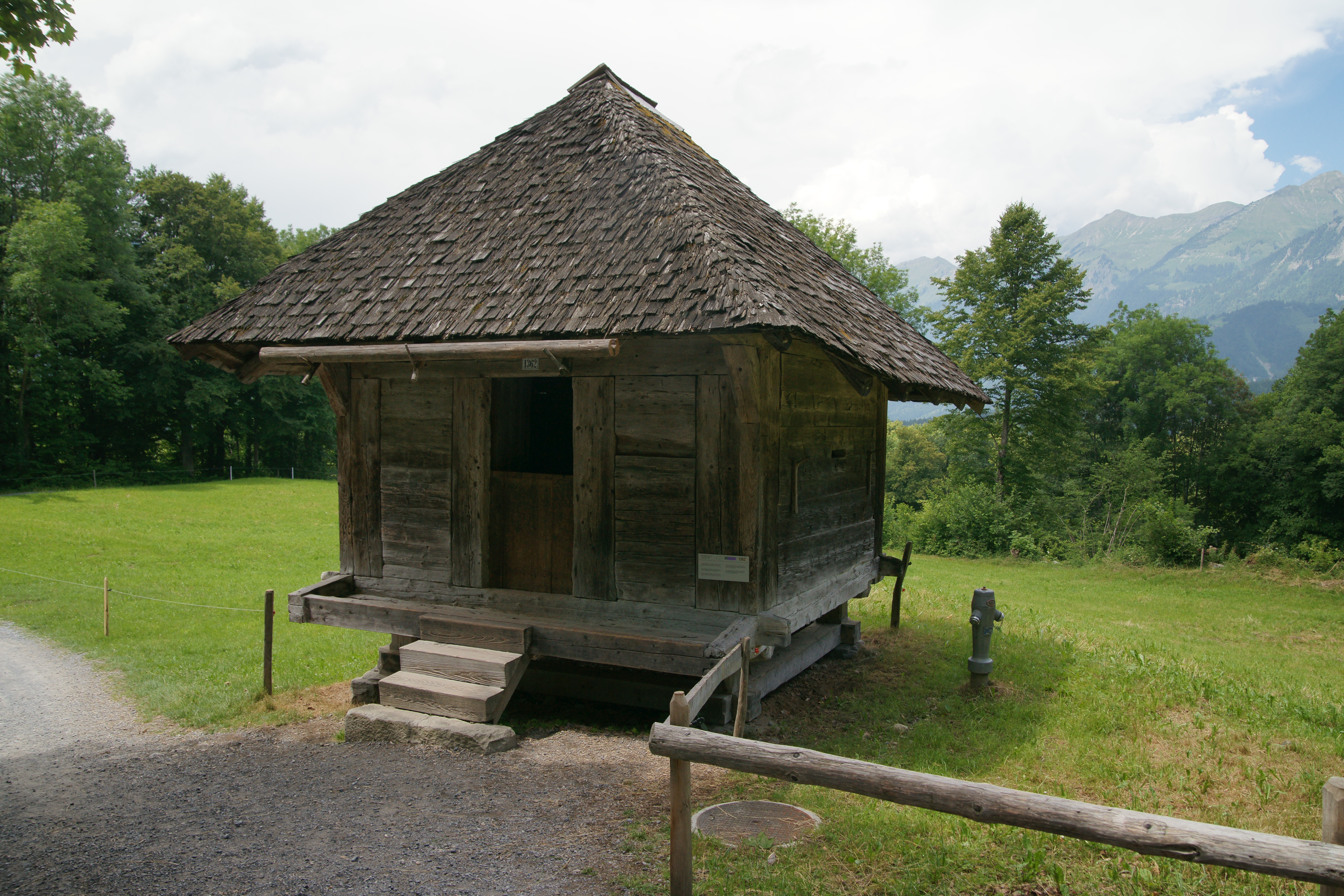
A traditional cheese storehouse, which was moved from Leissigen to the Ballenberg Open Air Museum.

Leissigen is first mentioned in 1285 as Lensengne. In 1290 it was mentioned as Lenxingen.

The oldest traces of a settlement in the area are scattered Bronze Age axes, daggers and swords. The first time the village appears in the historic record, during the Middle Ages, it belonged to the Herrschaft of Unspunnen-Rotenfluh. It was eventually inherited by the Freiherr of Weissenburg, who gave it to Interlaken Monastery in 1334. The village remained under the monastery's control for almost two centuries. In 1528, the city of Bern adopted the new faith of the Protestant Reformation and began imposing it on the Bernese Oberland. Lauterbrunnen joined many other villages and the monastery in an unsuccessful rebellion against the new faith. After Bern imposed its will on the Oberland, they secularized the monastery and annexed all the monastery lands.

The oldest village church was probably a wooden church from the 7th or 8th century. The probable wooden one was replaced with a stone building in the 9th or 10th century. The first stone church was replaced with an Early Medieval building in the 11th century. This second stone church was mentioned in the Strättliger Chronicle as one of the twelve churches around Lake Thun. The current building was built following a devastating fire in 1675.

The traditional economy of the village was closely tied to the lake. Many of the villagers were fishermen or boat builders while others farmed the narrow margin between the lake and the mountains. That began to change in 1780 when a spa was built around mineral springs on the lake shore. The springs dried up in 1873, but a small tourist industry was established in the village. In 1887 a dock was built for the steam ships which transported people and goods across the lake. Today most of the jobs in the village are in small industry, small businesses or summer tourism. About two-thirds of the working population commute to jobs in nearby Interlaken or to the city of Bern.

== Geography ==
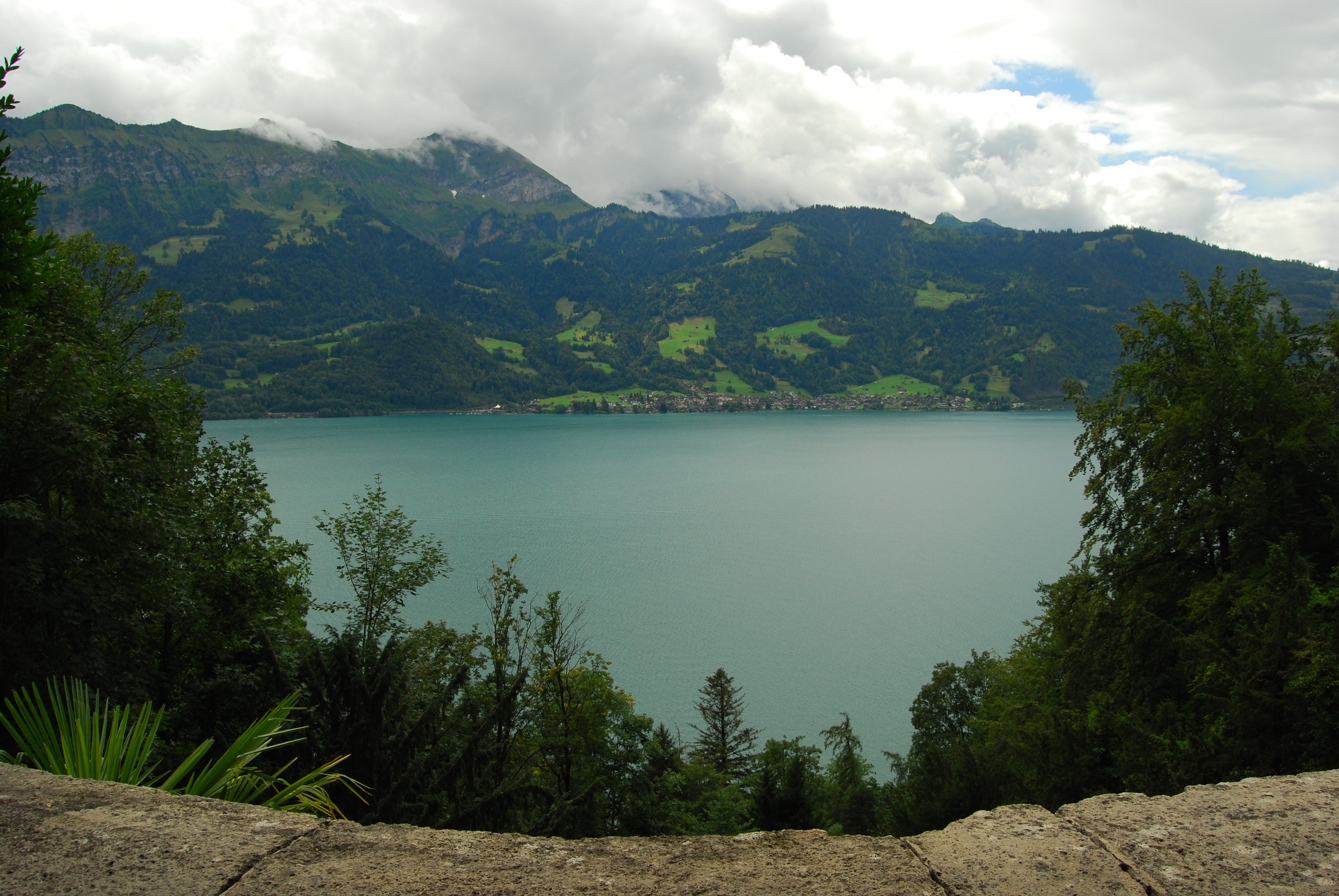
Leissigen village is visible on the far side of Lake Thun.

Aerial view (1956)

Leissigen has an area of 10.38 km^{2} (4.01 sq mi). Of this area, 3.25 km^{2} (1.25 mi^{2}) or 31.4% is used for agricultural purposes, while 5.39 km^{2} (2.08 mi^{2}) or 52.0% is forested. Of the rest of the land, 0.61 km^{2} (0.24 mi^{2}) or 5.9% is settled (buildings or roads), 0.1 km^{2} (25 acres) or 1.0% is either rivers or lakes and 1.02 km^{2} (0.39 mi^{2}) or 9.8% is unproductive land.

Of the built up area, housing and buildings made up 3.6% and transportation infrastructure made up 2.2%. Out of the forested land, 45.8% of the total land area is heavily forested and 2.9% is covered with orchards or small clusters of trees. Of the agricultural land, 13.3% is pastures and 18.1% is used for alpine pastures. All the water in the municipality is flowing water. Of the unproductive areas, 6.6% is unproductive vegetation and 3.3% is too rocky for vegetation.

Leissigen lies in the Bernese Oberland on Lake Thun. It includes the village and scattered individual farm houses. It stretches from the lake shore though woods and into the alps. The southern border of the municipality includes the Morgenberghorn 2,249 m (7,379 ft).

The settlement of Meielisalp with the scenic restaurant-hotel Meielisalp Leissigen is located in the mountains above the village.

On 31 December 2009 Amtsbezirk Interlaken, the municipality's former district, was dissolved. On the following day, 1 January 2010, it joined the newly created Verwaltungskreis Interlaken-Oberhasli.

== Coat of arms ==
The blazon of the municipal coat of arms is Gules two Fishes embowed in pale combattant.

== Demographics ==
Leissigen has a population (as of December 2020) of 1,171. As of 2010, 6.8% of the population are resident foreign nationals. Over the last 10 years (2000-2010) the population has changed at a rate of 9.9%. Migration accounted for 13.3%, while births and deaths accounted for -1.1%.

Most of the population (as of 2000) speaks German (841 or 93.7%) as their first language, Albanian is the second most common (16 or 1.8%) and French is the third (11 or 1.2%). There are 4 people who speak Italian and 1 person who speaks Romansh.

As of 2008, the population was 50.2% male and 49.8% female. The population was made up of 432 Swiss men (46.1% of the population) and 38 (4.1%) non-Swiss men. There were 441 Swiss women (47.1%) and 26 (2.8%) non-Swiss women. Of the population in the municipality, 236 or about 26.3% were born in Leissigen and lived there in 2000. There were 390 or 43.4% who were born in the same canton, while 124 or 13.8% were born somewhere else in Switzerland, and 101 or 11.2% were born outside of Switzerland.

As of 2010, children and teenagers (0–19 years old) make up 19% of the population, while adults (20–64 years old) make up 60.4% and seniors (over 64 years old) make up 20.6%.

As of 2000, there were 323 people who were single and never married in the municipality. There were 433 married individuals, 98 widows or widowers and 44 individuals who are divorced.

As of 2000, there were 140 households that consist of only one person and 19 households with five or more people. In 2000, a total of 348 apartments (68.5% of the total) were permanently occupied, while 145 apartments (28.5%) were seasonally occupied and 15 apartments (3.0%) were empty. As of 2010, the construction rate of new housing units was 8.5 new units per 1000 residents.

The historical population is given in the following chart:

== Politics ==
In the 2011 federal election the most popular party was the Swiss People's Party (SVP) which received 30.3% of the vote. The next three most popular parties were the Conservative Democratic Party (BDP) (21.3%), the Social Democratic Party (SP) (14%) and the FDP.The Liberals (9.1%). In the federal election, a total of 363 votes were cast, and the voter turnout was 49.1%.

== Economy ==
As of 2011, Leissigen had an unemployment rate of 1.6%. As of 2008, there were a total of 240 people employed in the municipality. Of these, there were 21 people employed in the primary economic sector and about 9 businesses involved in this sector. 58 people were employed in the secondary sector and there were 15 businesses in this sector. 161 people were employed in the tertiary sector, with 27 businesses in this sector. There were 436 residents of the municipality who were employed in some capacity, of which females made up 45.0% of the workforce.

In 2008 there were a total of 183 full-time equivalent jobs. The number of jobs in the primary sector was 11, of which 8 were in agriculture, 1 was in forestry or lumber production and 1 was in fishing or fisheries. The number of jobs in the secondary sector was 50 of which 21 or (42.0%) were in manufacturing, 11 or (22.0%) were in mining and 18 (36.0%) were in construction. The number of jobs in the tertiary sector was 122. In the tertiary sector; 9 or 7.4% were in wholesale or retail sales or the repair of motor vehicles, 5 or 4.1% were in the movement and storage of goods, 37 or 30.3% were in a hotel or restaurant, 4 or 3.3% were in the information industry, 5 or 4.1% were technical professionals or scientists, 7 or 5.7% were in education and 47 or 38.5% were in health care.

In 2000, there were 115 workers who commuted into the municipality and 297 workers who commuted away. The municipality is a net exporter of workers, with about 2.6 workers leaving the municipality for every one entering. Of the working population, 21.1% used public transportation to get to work, and 49.1% used a private car.

== Religion ==
From the 2000 census, 82 or 9.1% were Roman Catholic, while 652 or 72.6% belonged to the Swiss Reformed Church. Of the rest of the population, there were 2 members of an Orthodox church (or about 0.22% of the population), and there were 82 individuals (or about 9.13% of the population) who belonged to another Christian church. There were 25 (or about 2.78% of the population) who were Islamic. There was 1 person who was Hindu and 2 individuals who belonged to another church. 58 (or about 6.46% of the population) belonged to no church, are agnostic or atheist, and 35 individuals (or about 3.90% of the population) did not answer the question.

== Transport ==
Leissgen has regular bus service to Spiez and Interlaken. It formerly had rail service at Leissigen railway station on Lake Thun line.

== Education ==
In Leissigen about 366 or (40.8%) of the population have completed non-mandatory upper secondary education, and 99 or (11.0%) have completed additional higher education (either university or a Fachhochschule). Of the 99 who completed tertiary schooling, 71.7% were Swiss men, 20.2% were Swiss women and 5.1% were non-Swiss women.

The Canton of Bern school system provides one year of non-obligatory Kindergarten, followed by six years of Primary school. This is followed by three years of obligatory lower Secondary school where the students are separated according to ability and aptitude. Following the lower Secondary students may attend additional schooling or they may enter an apprenticeship.

During the 2010–11 school year, there were a total of 77 students attending classes in Leissigen. There was one kindergarten class with a total of 14 students in the municipality. The municipality had 3 primary classes and 58 students. Of the primary students, 1.7% were permanent or temporary residents of Switzerland (not citizens) and 5.2% have a different mother language than the classroom language. During the same year, there was one lower secondary class with a total of 5 students.

As of 2000, there were 38 students from Leissigen who attended schools outside the municipality.
