= Saxetbach =

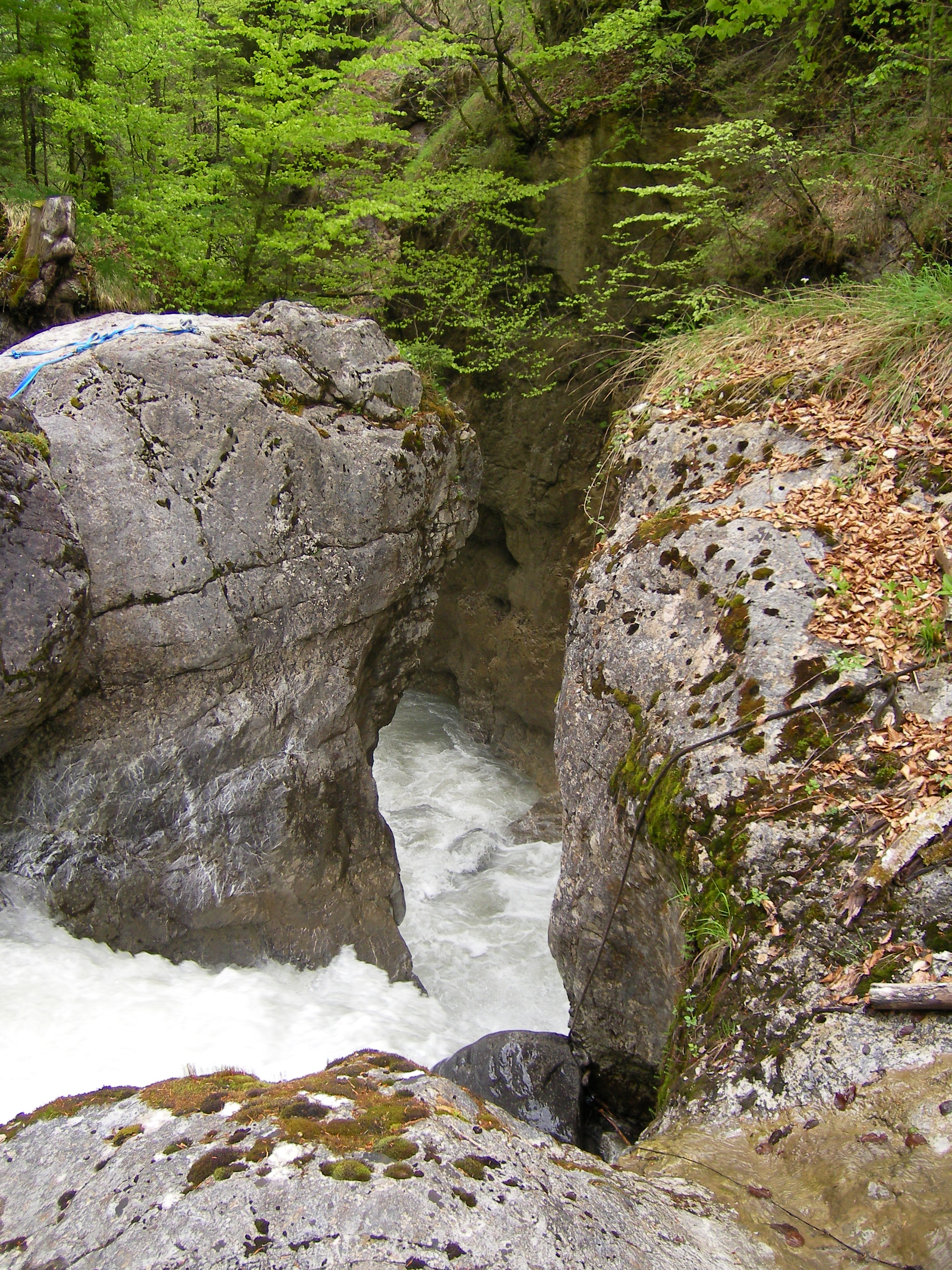

Location
- Country: Switzerland

Physical characteristics
- Mouth: Lütschine
  - coordinates: 46°39′34″N 7°52′3″E

Basin features
- Progression: Lütschine→ Lake Brienz→ Aare→ Rhine→ North Sea

The Saxetbach is a mountain river south of Interlaken in the Canton of Bern, Switzerland. It is a left tributary of the river Lütschine. It flows through the village Saxeten and joins the Lütschine in Wilderswil. It forms a narrow ravine, the Saxetbach Gorge.

== 1999 accident ==
On 27 July 1999, there was an accident in the Saxetenbach Gorge, above the village of Saxeten, in which 21 young people from Australia, New Zealand, England, South Africa, and Switzerland died. 48 people from two tour parties were doing a canyoning activity (where participants float, swim and climb through a confined area like a canyon). The event was organized by the company Adventure World (based in nearby Wilderswil).

Shortly after the activity began, flash floods swept through the gorge, resulting in the deaths of 21 people in the group. 18 were tourists and 3 were canyon guides. Authorities were alerted when bodies were seen in Lake Brienz.

The survivors were rescued and were questioned by police before being released. Identifying the dead was difficult – many bodies were badly traumatized, and participants had removed personal effects before starting the excursion. A number of survivors were able to identify the dead at the mortuary, but many had to be identified through DNA and dental analysis. Around 150 officers were involved in the operation. It was Switzerland's worst whitewater accident since 1993 when 17 people died in an accident in the Graubünden region.

Following the incident, there was significant criticism of the organiser Adventure World, noting their ignorance toward the storm warnings issued. Swiss authorities were quick to blame profit making and general negligence as the cause of the accident. The Swiss government also suspended all canyoning expeditions until a full investigation had taken place. A permanent memorial was opened between Wilderswil and Saxeten in July 2000.

In 2000, Adventure World ceased trading following an incident where an American tourist was killed in a bungee jumping accident. In December 2001, eight staff at Adventure World, including managers Felix Oehler and Bernhard Gafner were tried for manslaughter in connection to the deaths. Of the 8 staff trialled, six were found guilty of manslaughter through culpable negligence and given suspended sentences of between two and five months and fined between 4,000 and 7,500 CHF. Two tour guides were found not guilty, the judge declaring it was not their responsibility to cancel the excursion.

In 2019, on the 20th anniversary of the disaster, one of the six survivors Tiffany Johnson, released a book about her experience in the disaster Brave Enough Now.

== Photos ==
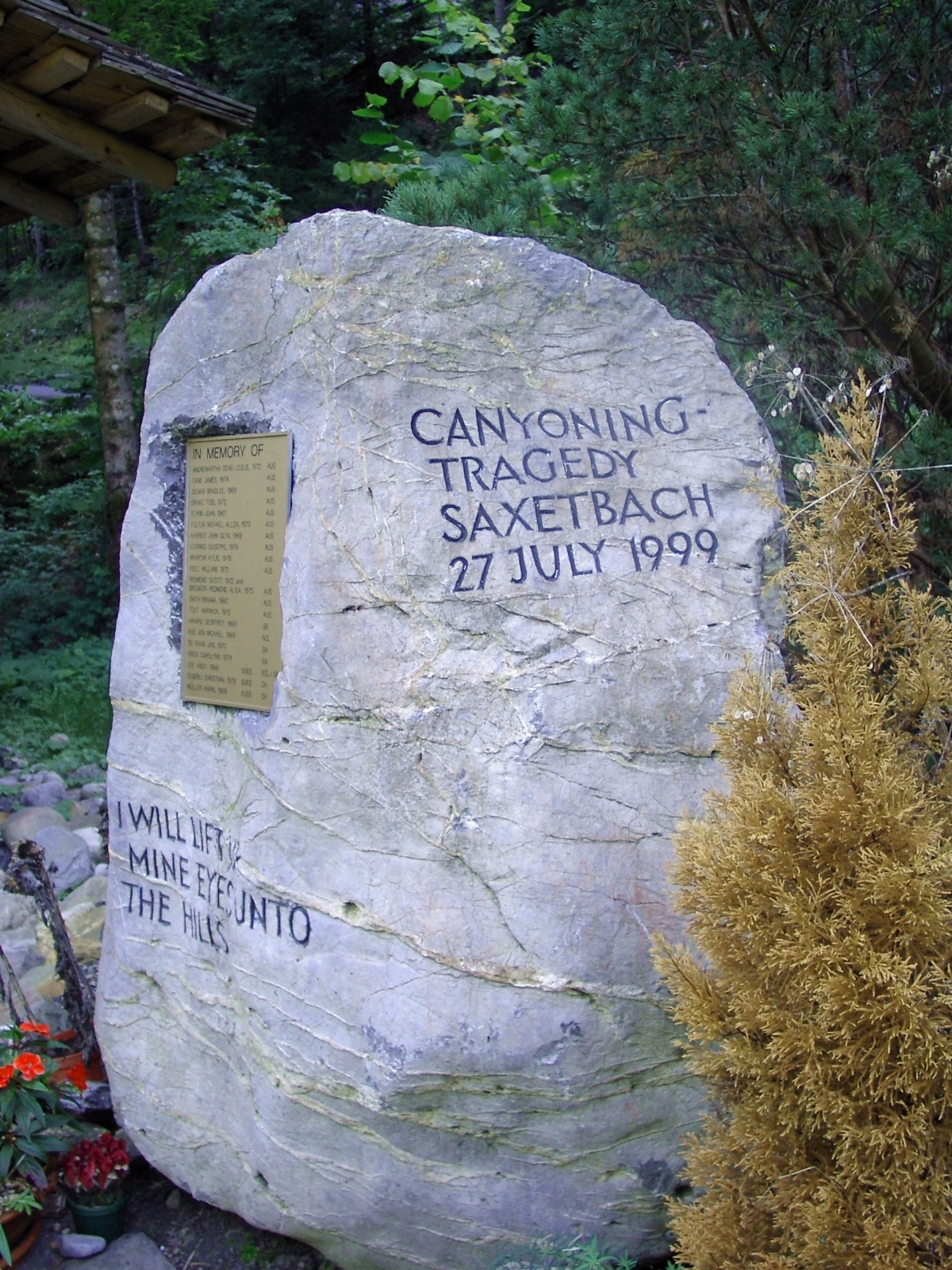
Saxetenbach disaster memorial

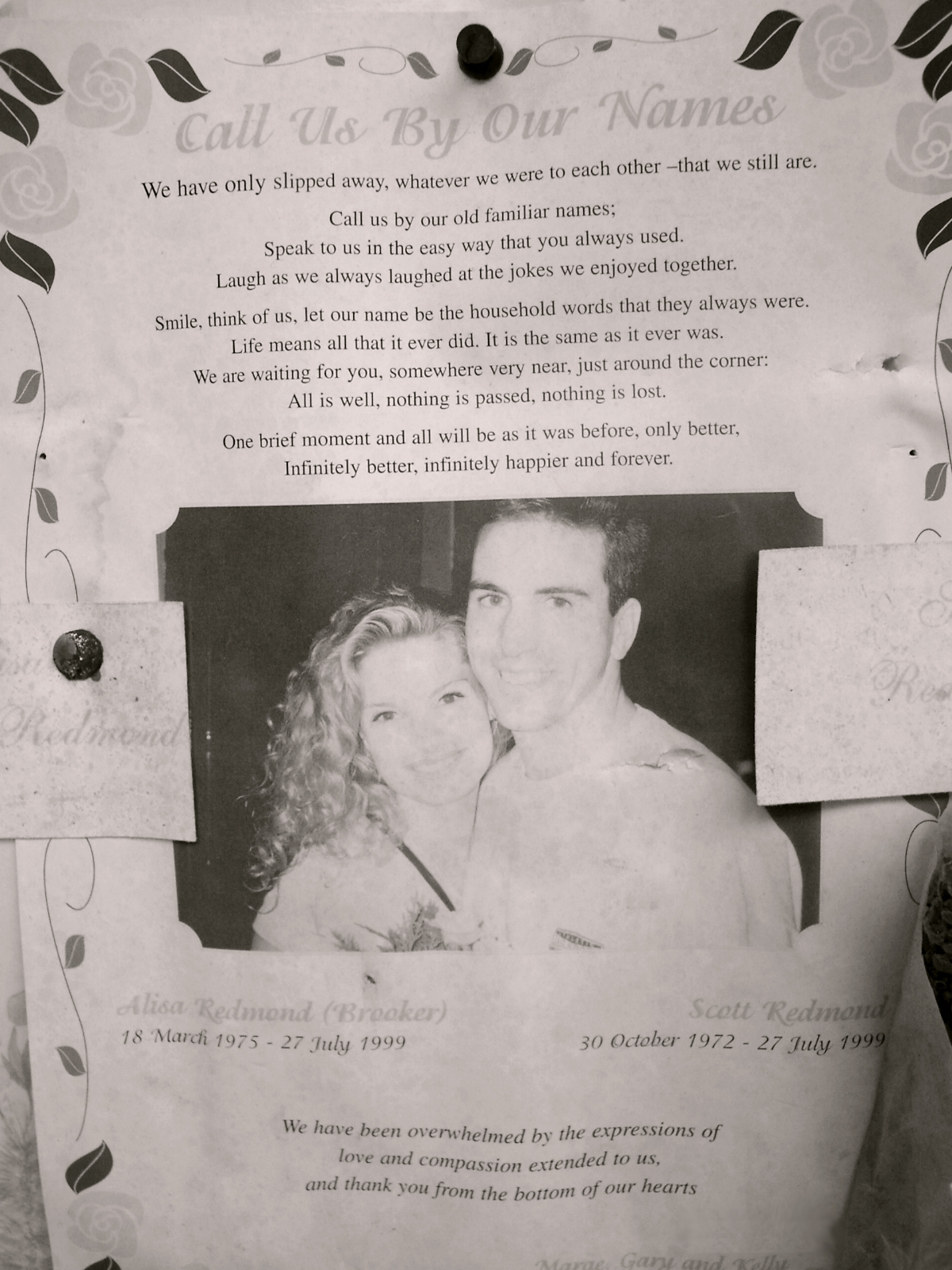
Messages left by family and friends at the Saxetenbach disaster memorial

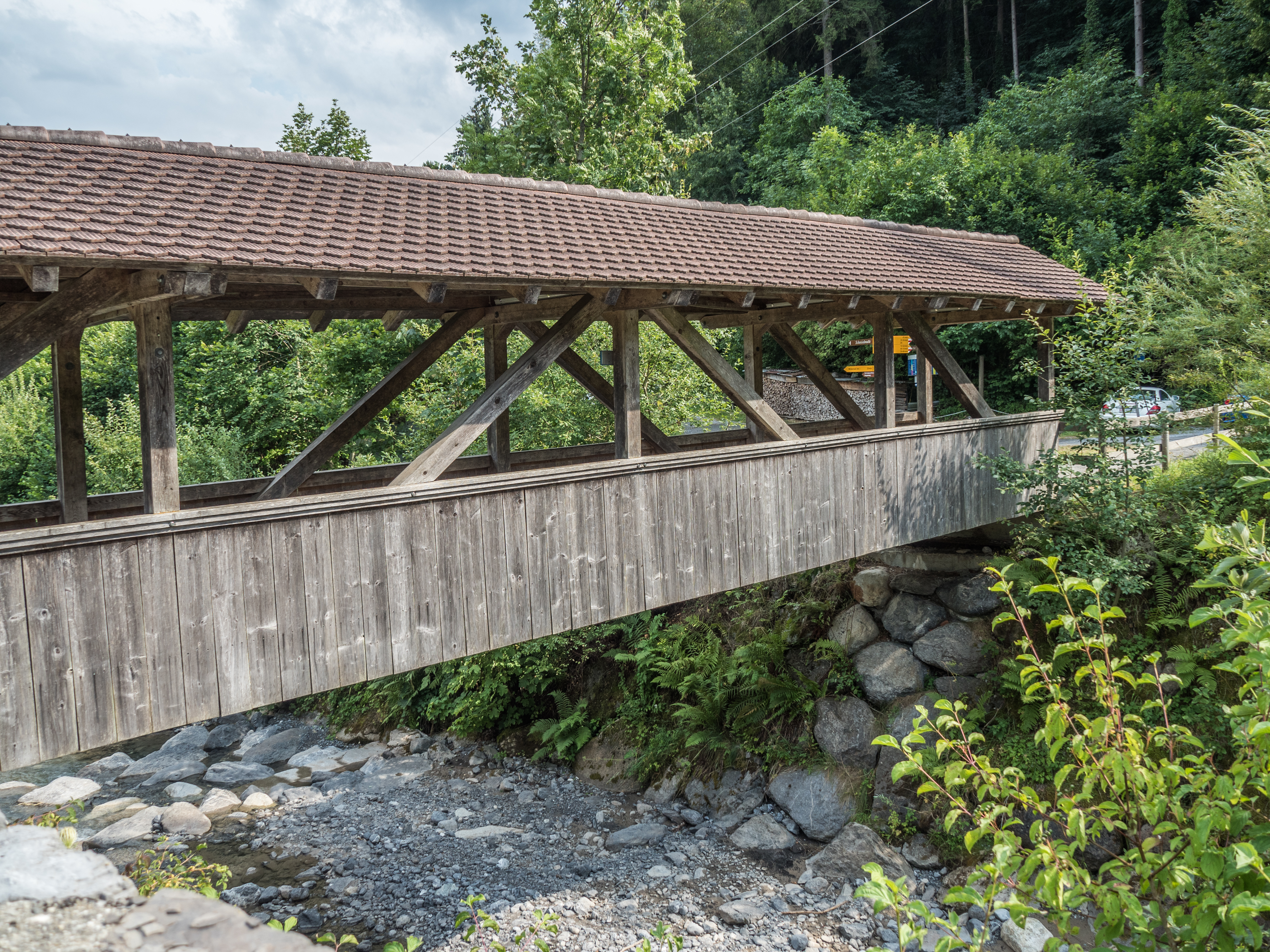
The Saxetenbridge across the Saxetbach connecting the walkway to Wilderswil

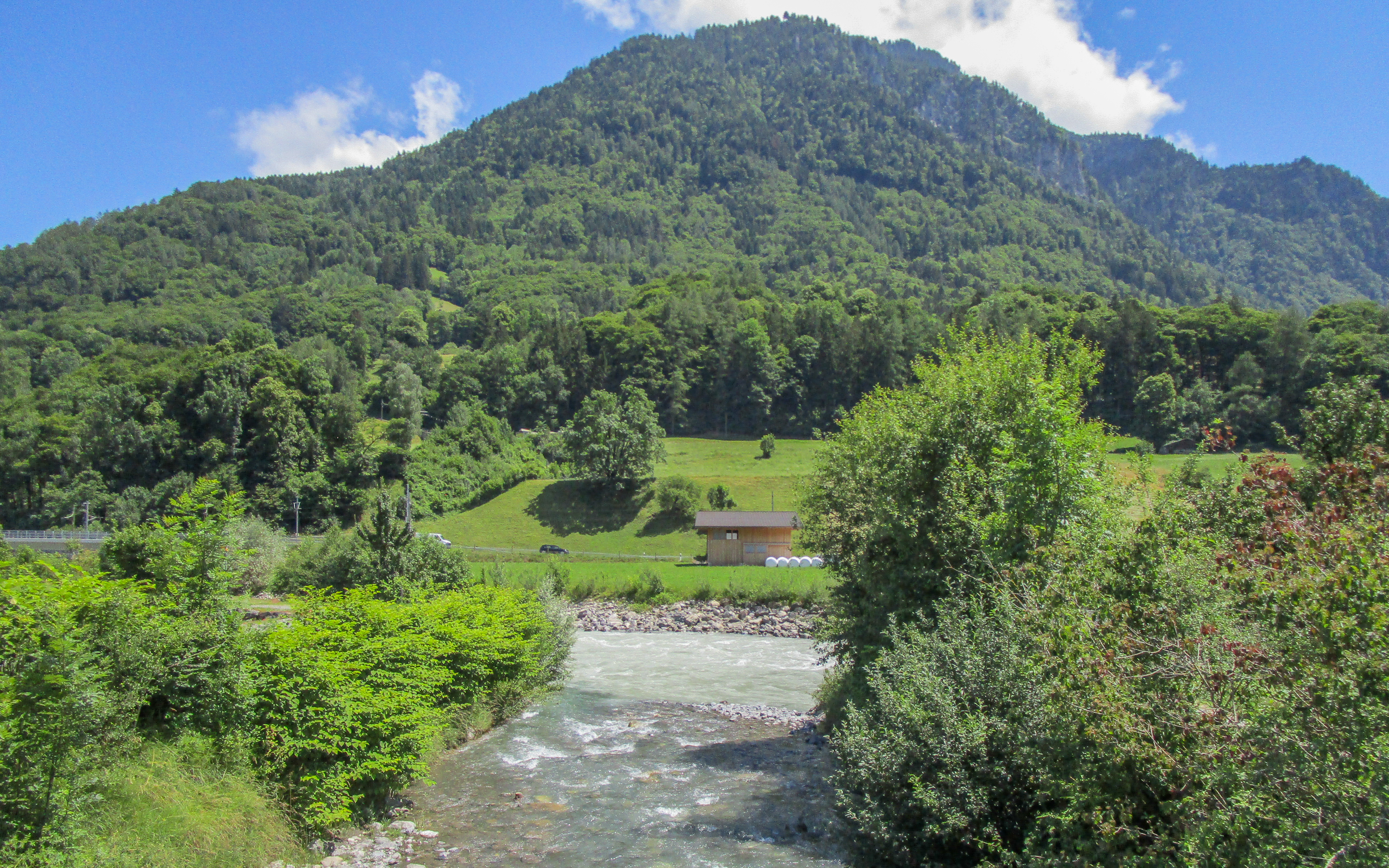
The Saxetbach joining the Lütschine
