= Leissigen railway station =

Train station in Leissigen, Switzerland

Leissigen
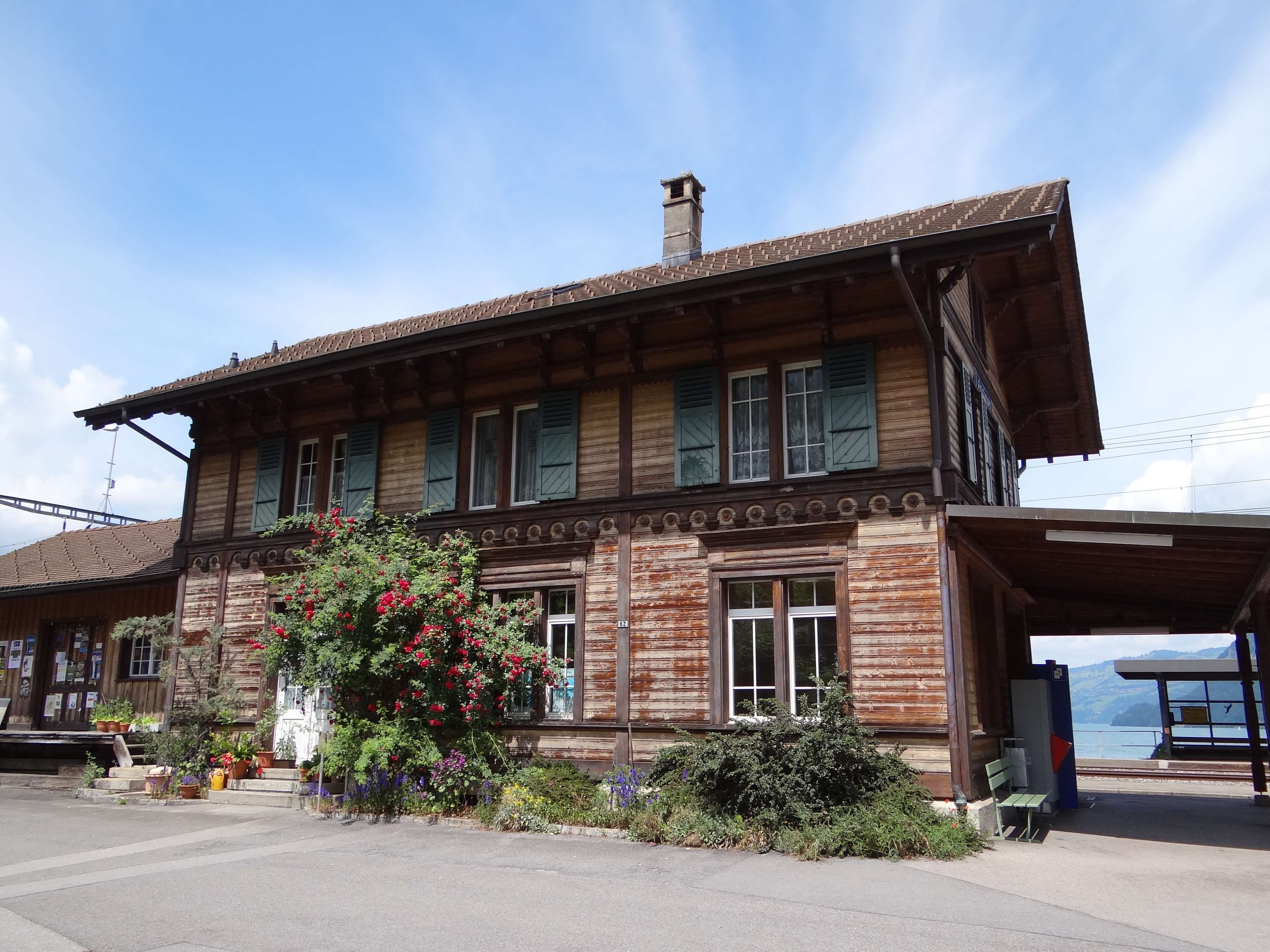
- The station building in 2013

General information
- Location: Leissigen; Switzerland
- Coordinates: 46°39′18″N 7°46′30″E
- Owner: BLS AG
- Line: Lake Thun line
- Distance: 18.5 km (11.5 mi) from Thun
- Connections: PostAuto Schweiz buses

Other information
- Fare zone: 720 (Libero)
Location

Leissigen railway station (German: Bahnhof Leissigen) is a closed railway station in the municipality of Leissigen, in the Swiss canton of Bern. It is an intermediate stop on the Lake Thun line. Direct rail service ended with the 2020 timetable change and was replaced with regular bus service between Spiez and Interlaken.
