= Saxeten =

- Municipality
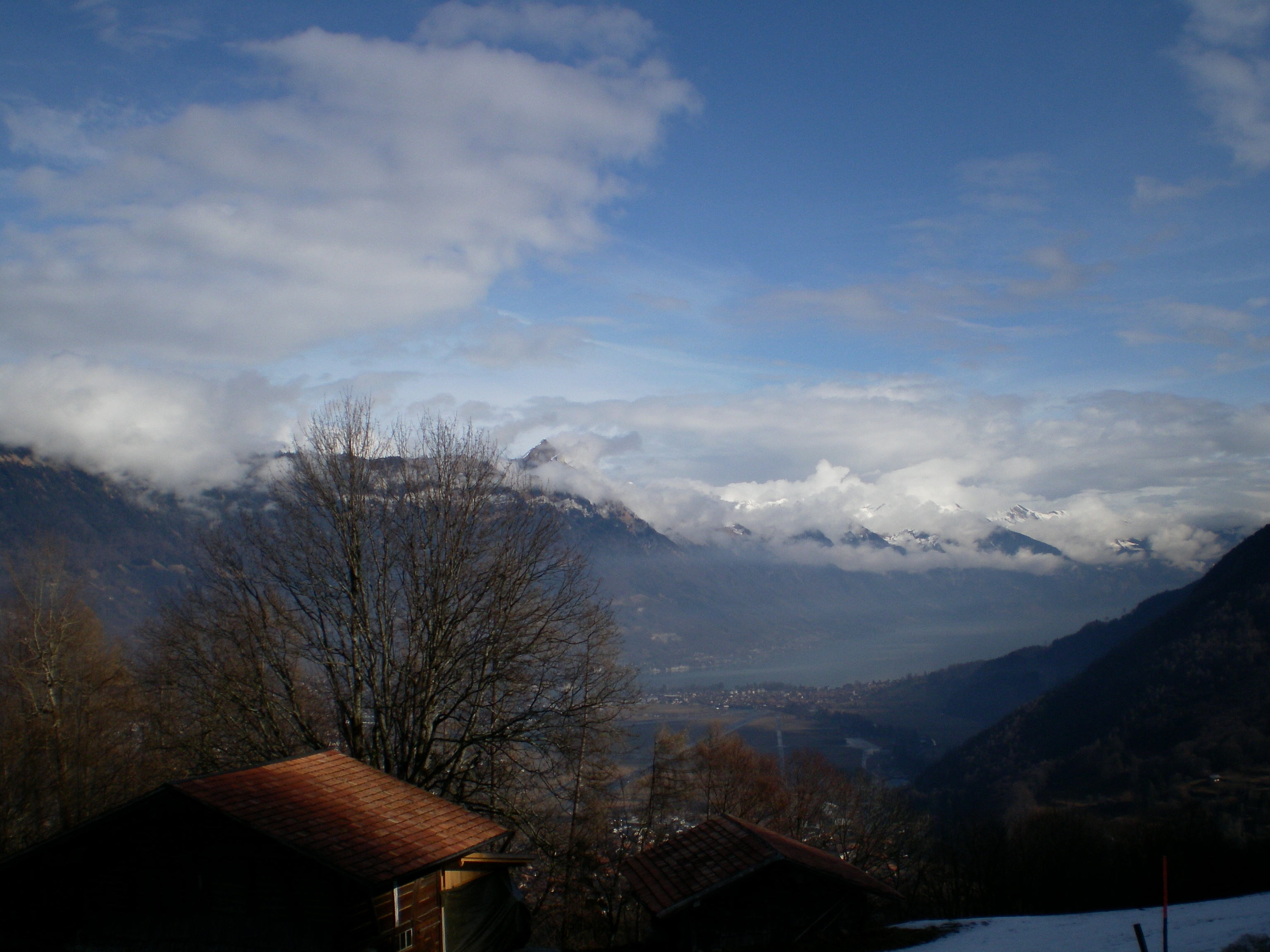
- Interlaken as viewed from Saxeten

- Flag Coat of arms
- Location of Saxeten
- Location within Switzerland Location within Canton of Bern
- Coordinates: 46°38′N 7°50′E
- Country: Switzerland
- Canton: Bern
- District: Interlaken-Oberhasli

Government
  - Executive: Gemeinderat with 5 members
  - Mayor: Gemeindepräsident(in); Robert Seematter (as of 2026)

Area
  - Total: 19.2 km^{2} (7.4 sq mi)
- Elevation: 1,103 m (3,619 ft)
- Highest elevation (Sulegg): 2,413 m (7,917 ft)

Population (December 2020)
  - Total: 92
  - Density: 4.8/km^{2} (12/sq mi)
- Time zone: UTC+01:00 (CET)
  - Summer (DST): UTC+02:00 (CEST)
- Postal code: 3813
- SFOS number: 591
- ISO 3166 code: CH-BE
- Localities: Aeschi bei Spiez, Därligen, Lauterbrunnen, Leissigen, Wilderswil
- Website: www.saxeten.ch

Saxeten is a municipality in the Interlaken-Oberhasli administrative district in the canton of Bern in Switzerland.

In 1999, Saxeten became internationally known following an incident where 21 tourists and guides were killed in a flash flood in the Saxetbach gorge.

== History ==
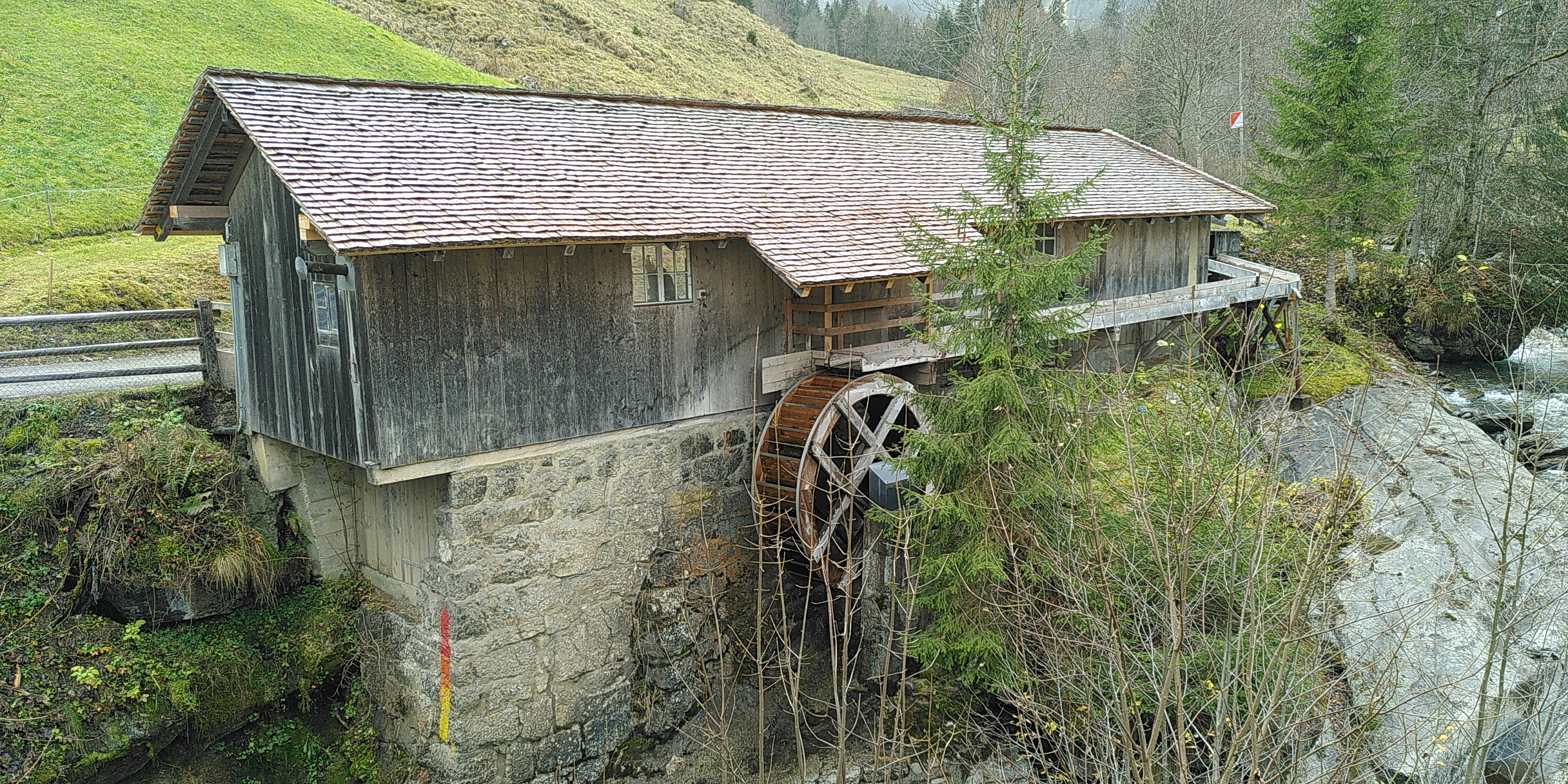
Saxeten's historic sawmill

Saxeten is first mentioned in 1303 as Sachsaton.

During the Middle Ages, the Saxetenbach valley belonged to the Unspunnen Herrschaft. During the 13th century the Freiherr of Weissenburg inherited a half share of the village from Unspunnen. In 1334, Weissenburg sold his share to Interlaken Monastery. The other half share remained with Unspunnen. In 1348–49, the village joined an unsuccessful rebellion of the Bernese Oberland against the monastery. In 1500, the Unspunnen half of the village was acquired by the city of Bern. In 1528, the city of Bern adopted the new faith of the Protestant Reformation and began imposing it on the Bernese Oberland. Iseltwald joined many other villages and the monastery in an unsuccessful rebellion against the new faith. After Bern imposed its will on the Oberland, they secularized the monastery and annexed all the monastery lands, finally combining the two shares of the village.

In 1828, Saxeten was noted in George Downes Guide Through Switzerland book. In 1856 and 1897, Alfred Wills and Karl Baedeker both wrote of hikes through and around the village of Saxeten.

Saxeten has always been part of the large parish of Gsteig bei Interlaken, now a village in the municipality of Gsteigwiler. On 31 December 2009 Amtsbezirk Interlaken, the municipality's former district, was dissolved. On the following day, 1 January 2010, it joined the newly created Verwaltungskreis Interlaken-Oberhasli.

=== Saxetenbach Disaster ===
On 27 July 1999, there was an accident in the Saxetenbach Gorge, just above the village of Saxeten, in which 21 young people from Australia, New Zealand, England, South Africa, and Switzerland died. 48 people from 2 coach tour parties had opted to do a side activity of canyoning where you float, swim and climb through an area, such as a gorge. It was organized by Adventure World, a now defunct company who were located in Wilderswil, not far from Saxeten. Shortly into the experience, flash floods began pouring through the gorge and 21 people within the group were swept to their deaths. 18 were tourists and 3 were canyon guides. The authorities were alerted to the incident when a local jogger spotted bodies in Lake Brienz.

In December 2001, eight staff at Adventure World, including managers Felix Oehler and Bernhard Gafner were tried for manslaughter in connection to the deaths. Six were found guilty of manslaughter through culpable negligence and given suspended sentences of between two and five months and fined between 4,000 and 7,500 CHF.

== Coat of arms ==
The blazon of the municipal coat of arms is Gules on a Pile inverted Argent two Ibex Horns Sable in Saltire.

== Geography ==
Saxeten has an area of 19.38 km^{2} (7.48 sq mi). Of this area, 7.77 km^{2} (3.00 mi^{2}) or 40.6% is used for agricultural purposes, while 6.07 km^{2} (2.34 mi^{2}) or 31.7% is forested. Of the rest of the land, 0.27 km^{2} (0.10 mi^{2}) or 1.4% is settled (buildings or roads), 0.3 km^{2} (0.12 mi^{2}) or 1.6% is either rivers or lakes and 4.75 km^{2} (1.83 mi^{2}) or 24.8% is unproductive land.

Of the built up area, housing and buildings made up 0.5% and transportation infrastructure made up 0.8%. Out of the forested land, 24.6% of the total land area is heavily forested and 4.0% is covered with orchards or small clusters of trees. Of the agricultural land, 4.4% is pastures and 36.2% is used for alpine pastures. All the water in the municipality is flowing water. Of the unproductive areas, 9.2% is unproductive vegetation and 15.6% is too rocky for vegetation.

Saxeten is located near the center of the Bödeli watershed. The Saxetenbach river flows through the gorge to Saxeten, before it joins the Lütschine in Wilderswil. Waterfalls mark the path around Saxeten including Wyssbachfall and the Saxetbachfall at the narrowest point of the Saxettal valley.

Two mountain peaks exist in the valley, the Sulegg, with an elevation of 2,413 meters (7,917 feet), being the highest summit in the municipality, at the eastern border, and the Morgenberghorn, with an elevation of 2,249 meters (7,379 feet), the second highest summit in the municipality, located on the western border of the municipality.

== Demographics ==
Saxeten has a population (as of December 2020) of 92, all Swiss citizens. Over the last 10 years (2000-2010) the population has changed at a rate of -24.8%. Migration accounted for -29.3%, while births and deaths accounted for 2.3%. Most of the population (as of 2000) speaks German (127 or 99.2%) as their first language with the rest speaking French

As of 2008, the population was 46.0% male and 54.0% female. The population was made up of 46 Swiss men and 54 Swiss women. Of the population in the municipality, 64 or about 50.0% were born in Saxeten and lived there in 2000. There were 46 or 35.9% who were born in the same canton, while 11 or 8.6% were born somewhere else in Switzerland, and 2 or 1.6% were born outside of Switzerland.

As of 2010, children and teenagers (0–19 years old) make up 17% of the population, while adults (20–64 years old) make up 54% and seniors (over 64 years old) make up 29%.

As of 2000, there were 57 people who were single and never married in the municipality. There were 64 married individuals, 6 widows or widowers and 1 individuals who are divorced.

As of 2000, there were 10 households that consist of only one person and 4 households with five or more people. In 2000, a total of 45 apartments (55.6% of the total) were permanently occupied, while 23 apartments (28.4%) were seasonally occupied and 13 apartments (16.0%) were empty. The vacancy rate for the municipality, in 2011, was 2.2%.

The historical population is given in the following chart:

== Politics ==
In the 2011 federal election the most popular party was the Swiss People's Party (SVP) which received 52.5% of the vote with a voter turnout was 44.0%.

In the 2019 Swiss federal election, the most popular party remained the Swiss People's Party (SVP) with a 75.1% vote share, followed by Green Party of Switzerland with 7.2% of votes and SP with 3.73% of votes. Voter turnout was 44.6%. In the 2023 Swiss federal election the SVP retained the municipality with 70% of the vote, with SP receiving 10.1% and the Green Party of Switzerland 6.8% of votes. Voter turn out was 36%.

== Economy ==
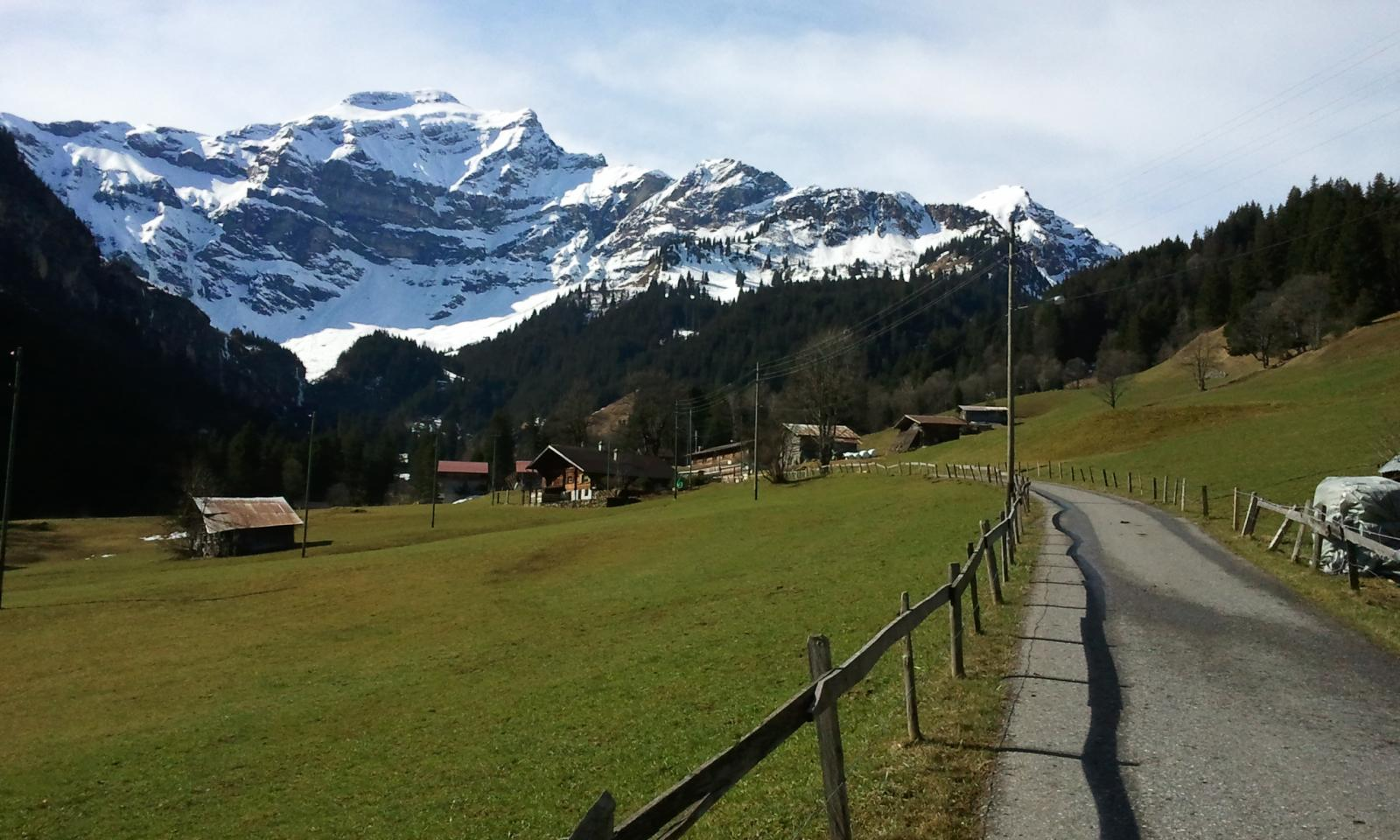
View of Saxeten village

As of 2011, Saxeten had an unemployment rate of 0.85%. As of 2008, there were a total of 39 people employed in the municipality. Of these, there were 22 people employed in the primary economic sector and about 10 businesses involved in this sector. 1 person was employed in the secondary sector and there was 1 business in this sector. 16 people were employed in the tertiary sector, with 4 businesses in this sector. There were 58 residents of the municipality who were employed in some capacity, of which females made up 34.5% of the workforce.

In 2008 there were a total of 22 full-time equivalent jobs. The number of jobs in the primary sector was 13, all of which were in agriculture. The number of jobs in the secondary sector was 1, all of which were in manufacturing. The number of jobs in the tertiary sector was 8. In the tertiary sector; 2 were in the movement and storage of goods, 2 were in a hotel or restaurant and 4 were in education.

In 2000, there were 3 workers who commuted into the municipality and 39 workers who commuted away. The municipality is a net exporter of workers, with about 13.0 workers leaving the municipality for every one entering. Of the working population, 12.1% used public transportation to get to work, and 58.6% used a private car.

There is one hotel in Saxeten, the Alpenrose which was founded in 1895. Seematter, a wood cutting company, is based in Saxeten. Agricultural coperatives Bergschaft Bällen and Bergschaft Innenberg constitute a significant part of the local economy.

== Religion ==
From the 2000 census, 4 or 3.1% were Roman Catholic, while 104 or 81.3% belonged to the Swiss Reformed Church. Of the rest of the population, there were 24 individuals (or about 18.75% of the population) who belonged to another Christian church. 2 (or about 1.56% of the population) belonged to no church, are agnostic or atheist, and 6 individuals (or about 4.69% of the population) did not answer the question.

== Education ==
In Saxeten about 34 or (26.6%) of the population have completed non-mandatory upper secondary education, and 3 or (2.3%) have completed additional higher education (either university or a Fachhochschule). All 3 who completed tertiary schooling were Swiss men.

The Canton of Bern school system provides one year of non-obligatory Kindergarten, followed by six years of Primary school. This is followed by three years of obligatory lower Secondary school where the students are separated according to ability and aptitude. Following the lower Secondary students may attend additional schooling or they may enter an apprenticeship.

During the 2010–11 school year, there were a total of 11 students attending classes in Saxeten. There were no kindergarten classes in the municipality. A total of 7 students attended a primary school in another municipality. During the same year, there was one lower secondary class with a total of 4 students.

As of 2000, there were 14 students in Saxeten who came from another municipality, while 6 residents attended schools outside the municipality.

== Transportation ==
Saxeten is served by the PostBus route 111 from Wilderswil Station. The vehicle is a smaller van as opposed to the traditional larger buses. There are 8 services daily, running year round, with some winter routes starting and ending at Saxeten Skipintli. As of 2016, the Wilderswil-Saxeten service was the last PostBus delivering milk in Switzerland.

== Winter sports ==
Saxeten has a small ski area at Skipintli. There are two runs, generally in operation from December until March along with a single surface lift to the top. The Swiss Alpine Ski club promotes a ski touring route from Saxeten to the Rengghorn mountain. In addition, Saxeten has a toboggan run from Alp Nessleren to the village centre.

== Notable people ==
- Elisabeth Flühmann (1851–1929), teacher and women's rights activist

== See also ==
- Saxetbach
