= Sternwarte Sirius =

- Alternative names: Sternwarte - Planetarium SIRIUS
- Organization: Stiftung Sternwarte Planetarium SIRIUS
- Location: Schwanden, Sigriswil, Switzerland
- Coordinates: 46.7393°N 7.7264°E
- Altitude: 1,075 m (3,527 ft)
- Website: www.sternwarte-planetarium.ch

Telescopes
- unnamed: RC-Cassegrain

Sternwarte Sirius is an astronomical observatory owned and operated by Stiftung Sternwarte Planetarium SIRIUS. It is located at Schwanden above Sigriswil in the canton of Bern, Switzerland.
