= Elisabeth Flühmann =

Swiss teacher and women's rights activist (1851–1929)

- Born: 3 January 1851; Saxeten, Switzerland
- Died: 13 March 1929 (aged 78); Aarau, Switzerland
- Occupations: Teacher, women's rights activist
- Known for: Founding the Aargau Women Teachers' Association

Elisabeth Flühmann (3 January 1851 – 13 March 1929) was a Swiss teacher and women's rights activist. She founded the Aargau Women Teachers' Association in 1890 and played a key role in establishing the Swiss retirement home for women teachers in Bern.

== Early life and education ==
Flühmann was born on 3 January 1851 in Saxeten, the daughter of Johannes Flühmann, a mountain farmer and gunsmith. She attended the girls' upper school in Bern before emigrating to America with her parents. After returning to Switzerland, she obtained a teacher's certificate. Following four years of teaching in Wengen, she pursued further studies in Zurich and Bern, earning a certificate qualifying her to teach religion, German, and pedagogy at the secondary level.

== Career ==
After completing her education, Flühmann taught at teacher training schools, first in Macedonia and then in Aarau from 1880 to 1915. In 1890, she founded the Aargau Women Teachers' Association. She was one of the driving forces behind the establishment of the Swiss retirement home for women teachers in Bern.

== Women's rights activism ==
In 1919, Flühmann published an essay on women's suffrage and founded the Association for Education and Women's Issues (Verband für Frauenbildung und Frauenfragen ins Leben), which became two years later the Swiss Women's Association Liaison Center of Aargau (Aargauer Frauenzentrale als Zusammenschluss) in 1921.

== Death ==
Flühmann died unmarried on 13 March 1929 in Aarau.
