= Faulensee railway station =

Train station in Switzerland

Faulensee
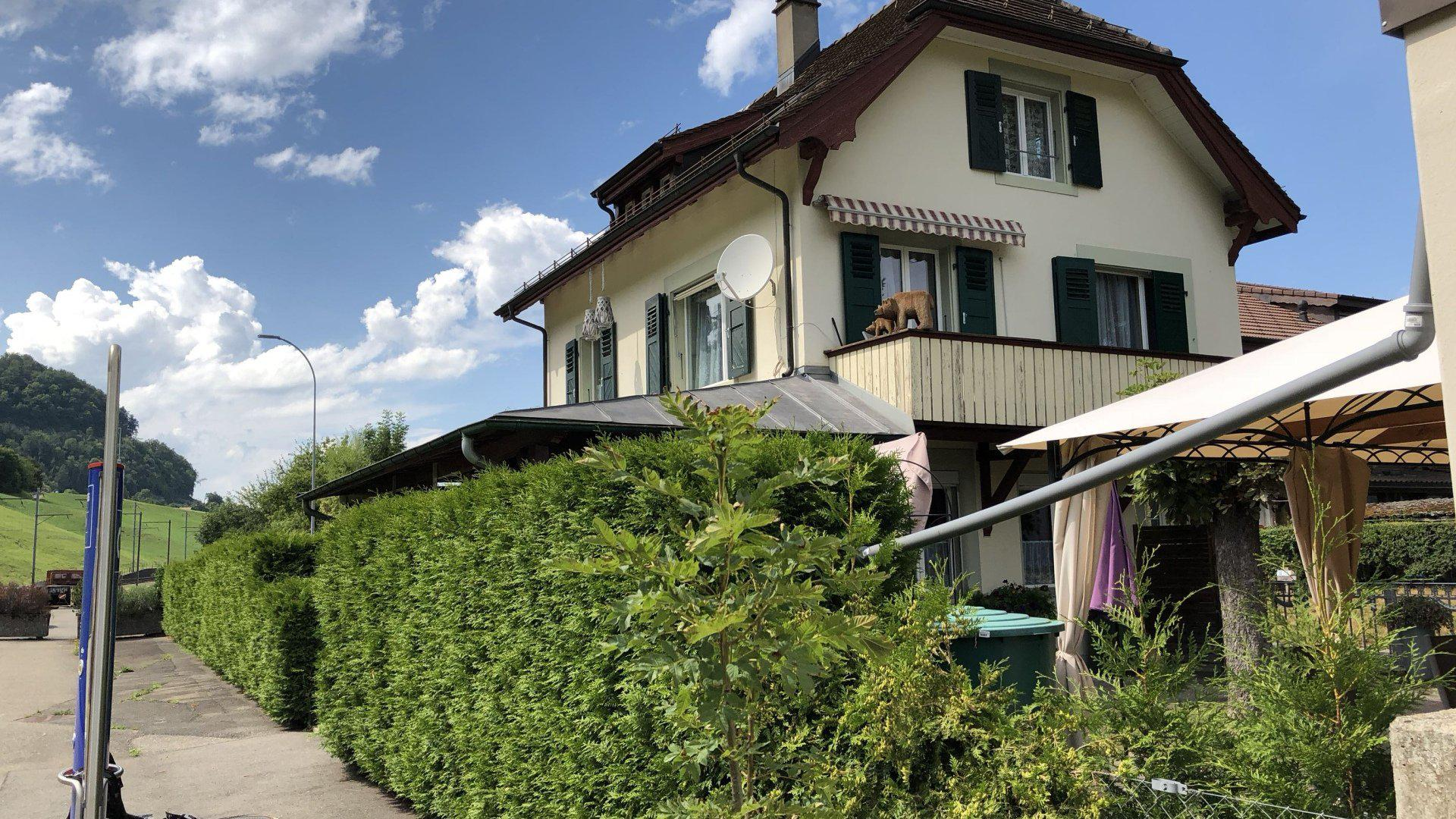
- The station building in 2018

General information
- Location: Spiez; Switzerland
- Coordinates: 46°40′26″N 7°41′53″E
- Owner: BLS AG
- Line: Lake Thun line
- Distance: 11.9 km (7.4 mi) from Thun
- Connections: PostAuto Schweiz buses

Other information
- Fare zone: 720 (Libero)
Location

Faulensee railway station (German: Bahnhof Faulensee) is a closed railway station in the municipality of Spiez, in the Swiss canton of Bern. It is an intermediate stop on the Lake Thun line. Direct rail service ended with the 2020 timetable change and was replaced with regular bus service between Spiez and Interlaken.
