= Därligen railway station =

Train station in Switzerland

Därligen
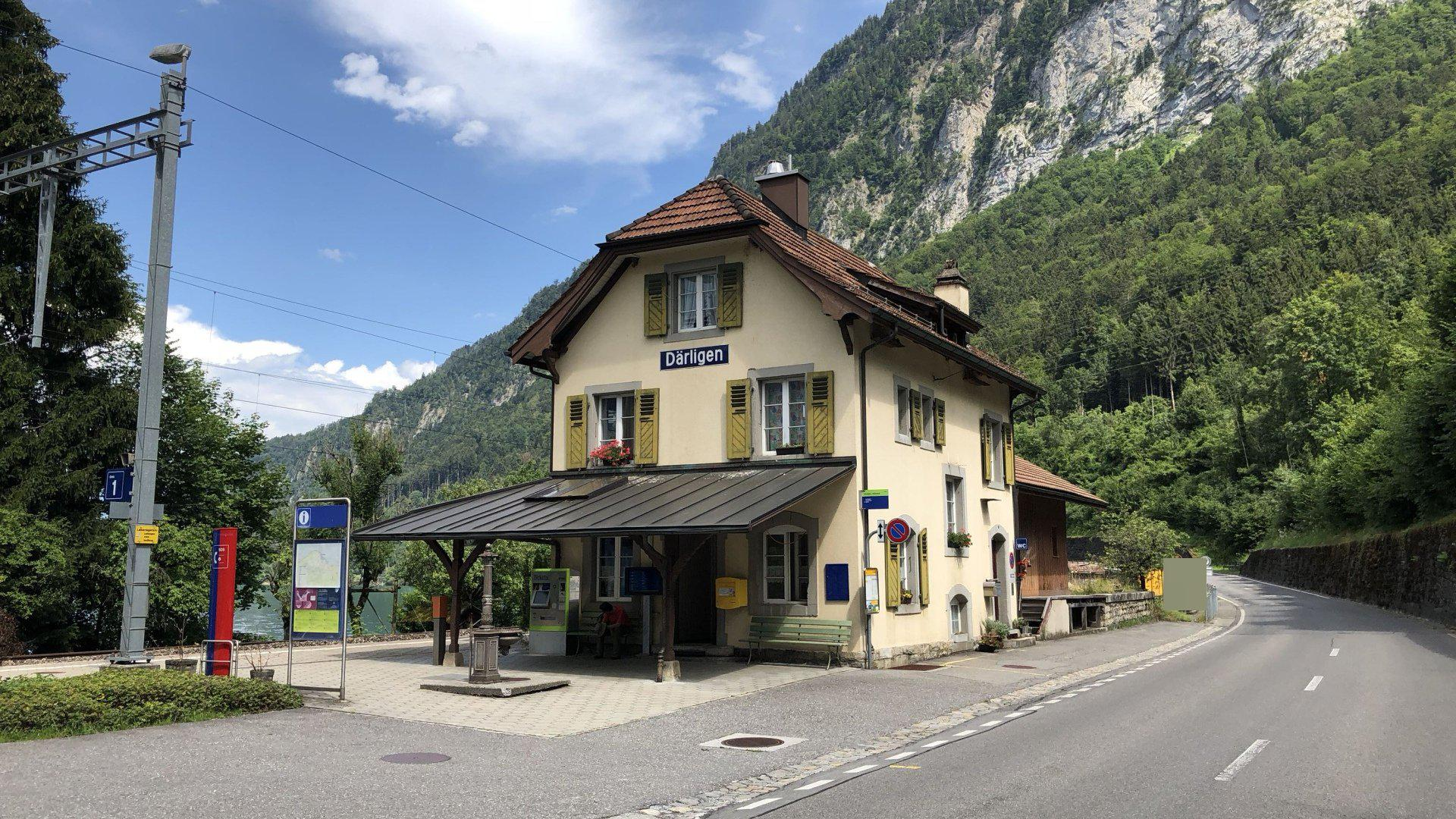
- The station building in 2018

General information
- Location: Därligen; Switzerland
- Coordinates: 46°39′36″N 7°48′54″E
- Owner: BLS AG
- Line: Lake Thun line
- Distance: 22.0 km (13.7 mi) from Thun
- Connections: PostAuto Schweiz buses

Other information
- Fare zone: 720 (Libero)
Location

Därligen railway station (German: Bahnhof Därligen) is a closed railway station in the municipality of Därligen, in the Swiss canton of Bern. It is an intermediate stop on the Lake Thun line. Direct rail service ended with the 2020 timetable change and was replaced with regular bus service between Spiez and Interlaken.
