= Lake Thun railway line =

Key Swiss transport link

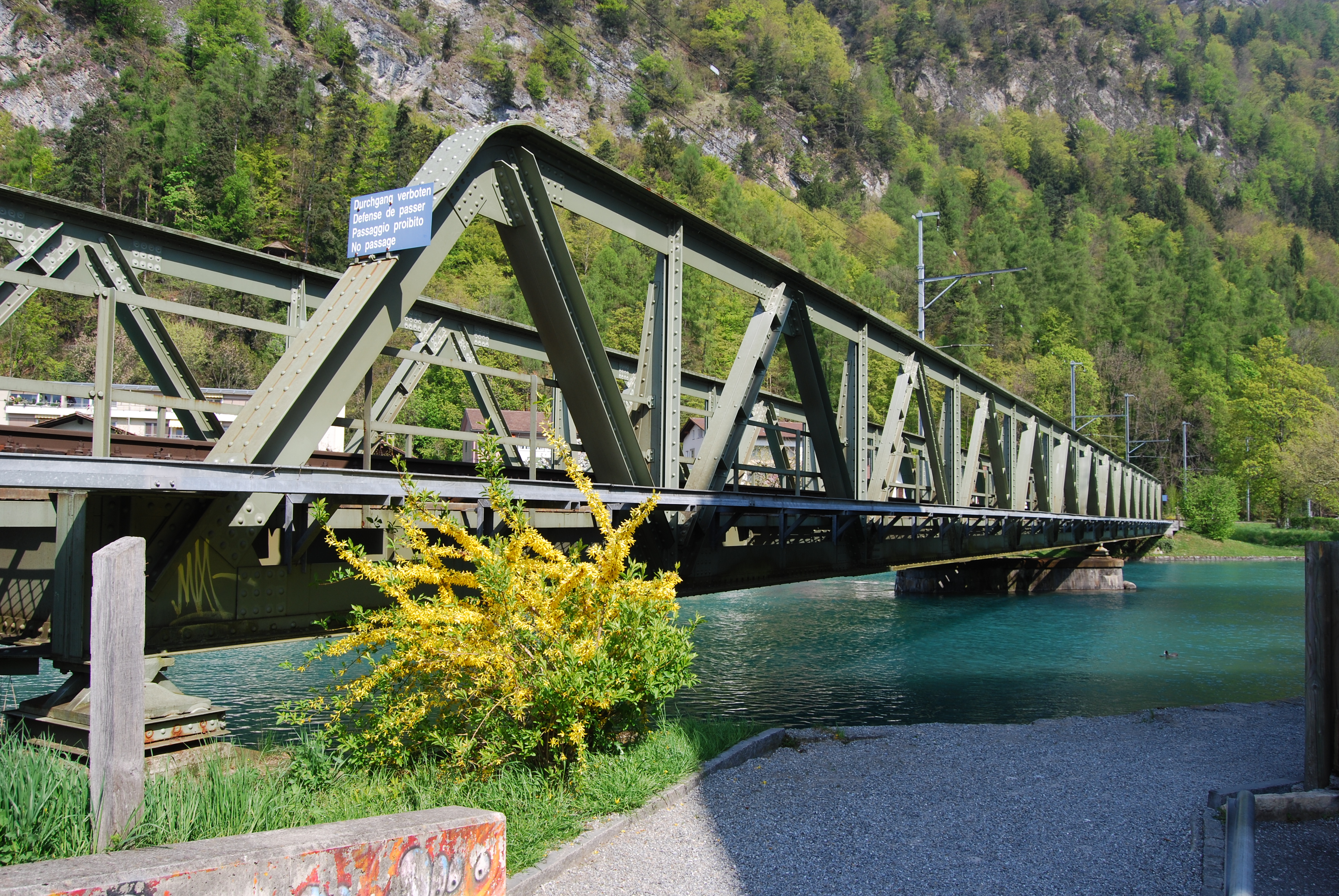
- Railway bridge over the Aare in Interlaken

Overview
- Owner: BLS AG
- Locale: Canton of Bern, Switzerland
- Termini: Thun; Interlaken

Technical
- Line length: 27.9 km (17.3 mi)
- Track gauge: 1,435 mm (4 ft 8 1/2 in) standard gauge
- Electrification: 15 kV 16.7 Hz AC supplied by overhead line

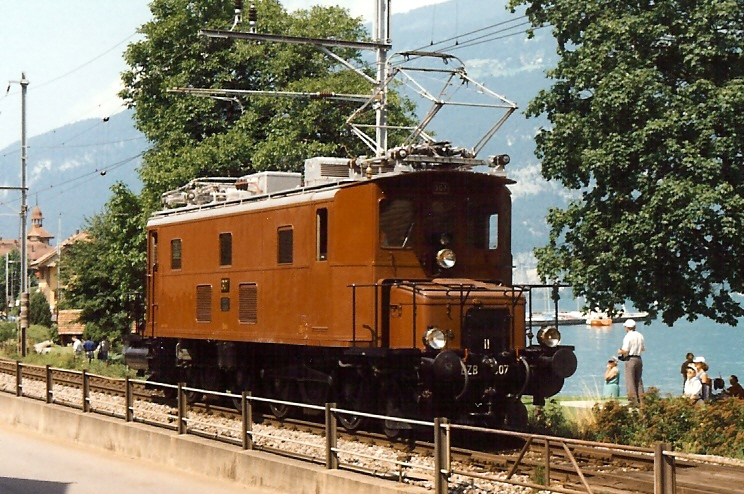
Historic BLS locomotive at Därligen

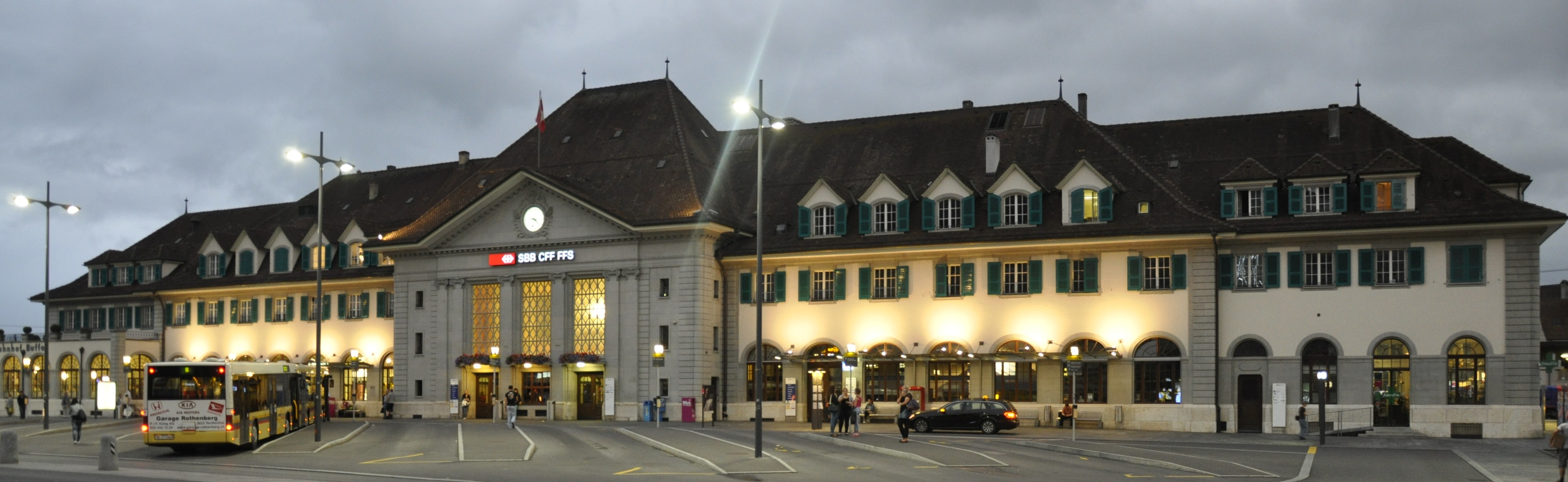
Thun railway station

The Lake Thun railway line is a railway line in the Swiss canton of Bern. It links the towns of Thun, Spiez and Interlaken, running principally along the southern shore of Lake Thun. The line was opened in 1893 by the Lake Thun Railway (German: Thunerseebahn, TSB) company, but incorporates much of the earlier Bödeli Railway (German: Bödelibahn) dating back to 1872.

The line is 27.9-kilometre (17.3 mi) long, and is currently owned and operated by the BLS AG railway company. Besides traffic to and from Interlaken, the section of line between Thun and Spiez also carries heavy traffic to and from the Lötschberg line.

== History ==
The history of the Lake Thun line is linked to that of the shipping services on Lake Thun and Lake Brienz, which date back to at least 1834, when the first steamship was introduced. The two lakes are linked by a 5.5 km (3.4 mi) stretch of the Aare through Interlaken, but the river is not navigable, dropping some 6 metres (19.7 ft) and passing over several weirs.

In 1872, the first part of the Bödeli Railway was built, from Därligen, on Lake Thun, to what is now Interlaken West station. In 1874, it was extended, via what is now Interlaken Ost station, to Bönigen, on Lake Brienz. The line was not connected to any other railway, and served to connect the shipping on the two lakes to each other, and to Interlaken. The route of the Bödeli Railway crosses the Aare twice, using bridges with little headroom beneath them, and it has been suggested that this was done deliberately in order to dissuade attempts to canalise the river and thus maintain the railway's role.

From 1873, the Bödeli Railway also operated a train ferry on Lake Thun, providing a connection for freight to the Bern–Thun railway line at Thun. In 1890, the Lake Thun Railway company obtained a concession for a railway from Scherzligen in Thun, via Spiez, to an end-on connection with the existing Bödeli Railway at Därligen. This line started operation in 1893, and also leased the Bödeli Railway between Därligen and Interlaken Ost. The Bödeli Railway was fully incorporated into the Lake Thun Railway company in 1900.

In 1901, the Spiez to Frutigen line was opened, which was to become the first stage of the Lötschberg line, carrying heavy traffic across the Alps, and transforming the stretch of the Lake Thun line between Thun and Spiez. In 1913, the Lake Thun Railway company was taken over by the Bern-Lötschberg-Simplon Railway, which became today's BLS AG.

Bönigen remained the eastern terminus of the line until 1969, when passenger service was cut back to Interlaken Ost station. However the BLS had built its main workshops alongside the line at Bönigen's western edge, and these remain open, along with the track between Interlaken and the workshops. The rest of line was removed, although the site of the lakeside terminus can still be identified.

Local passenger services between Thun and Spiez were withdrawn in June 2001 in favor of a new bus route between Steffisburg, Thun, and Spiez. In the first ten years of operation, ridership increased 93%.

With the 2020 timetable change, BLS dropped service at the three intermediate stations between Spiez and Interlaken: Faulensee, Leissigen, and Därligen. Regular bus service replaced the hourly Regio service that had previously operated.

== Route and infrastructure ==
The 27.9-kilometre (17.3 mi) long Lake Thun line commences at Thun station, where it makes an end on junction with the Swiss Federal Railways owned Bern to Thun main line, and two other lines owned by the BLS AG; the Gürbetal line from Bern via Belp and the Burgdorf–Thun railway from Burgdorf via Konolfingen.

Near the intermediate Spiez station, the Lake Thun line has junctions with two further lines owned by the BLS AG; the Spiez–Erlenbach–Zweisimmen line from Zweisimmen and the Lötschberg line to Brig-Glis.

The line terminates just to the east of Interlaken Ost station, where it connects with the metre gauge Brünig line, which operates to Lucerne and is owned by the Zentralbahn, and the Berner Oberland-Bahnen, which operates to Grindelwald and Lauterbrunnen.

The Lake Thun line is built to standard gauge and is electrified using the Swiss mainline standard of 15 kV 16.7 Hz AC supplied by overhead line. Between Thun and Spiez the line is double-tracked; from Spiez to Interlaken it is single track with passing loops. Besides traffic to and from Interlaken, the section of line between Thun and Spiez also carries heavy traffic to and from the Lötschberg line.
