= Därligen =

- Municipality
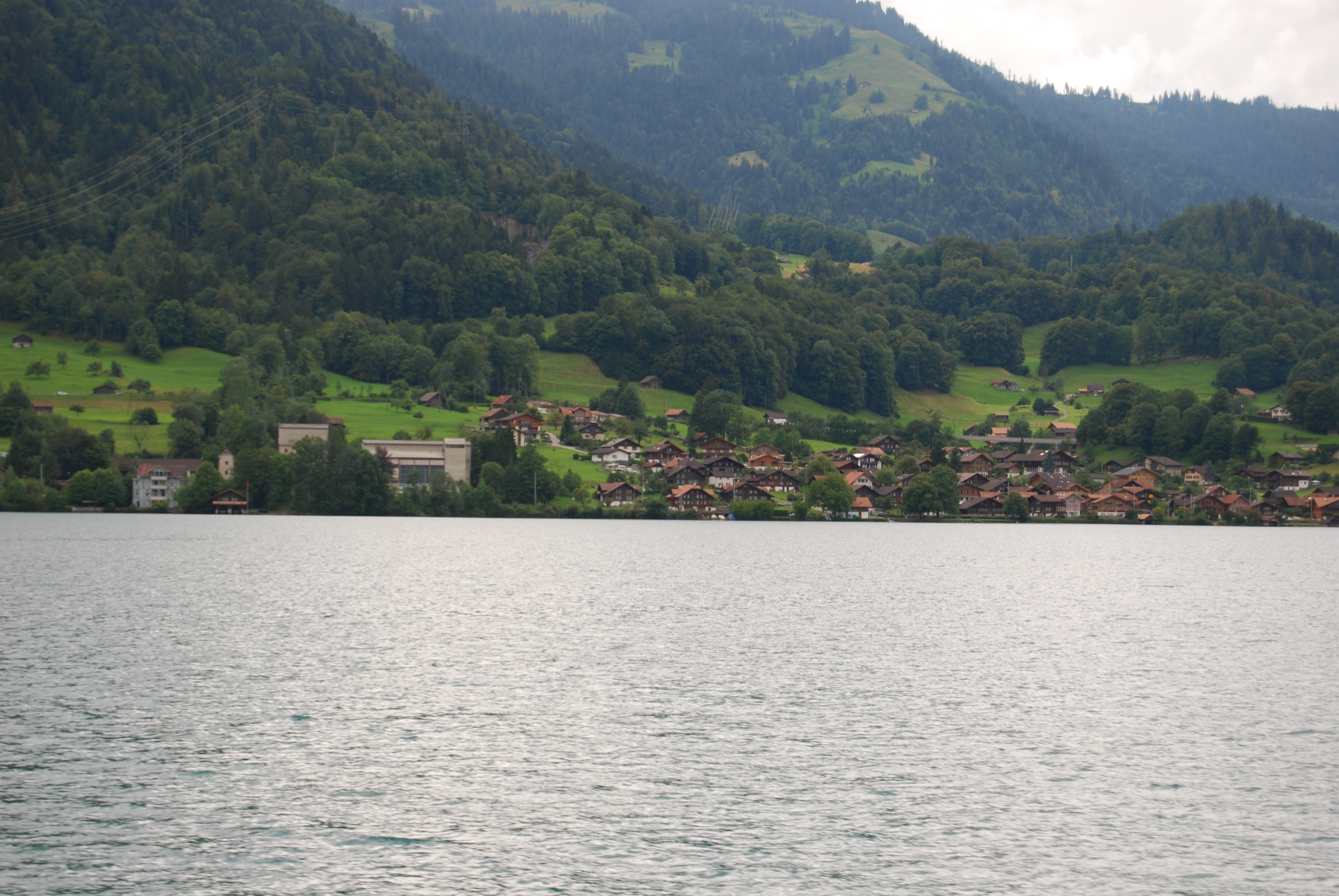
- Därligen village on the shores of Lake Thun

- Flag Coat of arms
- Location of Därligen
- Location within Switzerland Location within Canton of Bern
- Coordinates: 46°39′N 7°48′E
- Country: Switzerland
- Canton: Bern
- District: Interlaken-Oberhasli

Government
  - Executive: Gemeinderat with 5 members
  - Mayor: Gemeindepräsident(in); Hans Wolf (as of 2026)

Area
  - Total: 6.9 km^{2} (2.7 sq mi)
- Elevation: 567 m (1,860 ft)

Population (December 2020)
  - Total: 415
  - Density: 60/km^{2} (160/sq mi)
- Time zone: UTC+01:00 (CET)
  - Summer (DST): UTC+02:00 (CEST)
- Postal code: 3707
- SFOS number: 575
- ISO 3166 code: CH-BE
- Surrounded by: Interlaken, Matten bei Interlaken, Wilderswil, Saxeten and Leissigen
- Website: www.daerligen.ch

Därligen (German pronunciation: [ˈdɛʁlɪɡn̩]) is a municipality in the Interlaken-Oberhasli administrative district in the canton of Bern in Switzerland.

== History ==
Därligen is first mentioned in 1244 as Tedningen.

The earliest traces of settlement in the area are scattered Bronze Age artifacts which have been discovered near the lake shore. The village was part of the Herrschaft of Unspunnen during the Middle Ages. It was annexed by Bern in 1515.

The Bödelibahn railway from Därligen to Interlaken opened in 1872 and was extended to Bönigen in 1874. Initially this line was unconnected to the rest of the Swiss railway system, and merely served as a link between the steamships on both lakes, with all goods and passengers transferred between boat and train at Därligen. However, in 1893, the line was extended westwards to Thun, with onward connections to Bern and beyond, thus removing the need for such transfer. The line eventually became part of the Bern–Lötschberg–Simplon railway.

== Geography ==
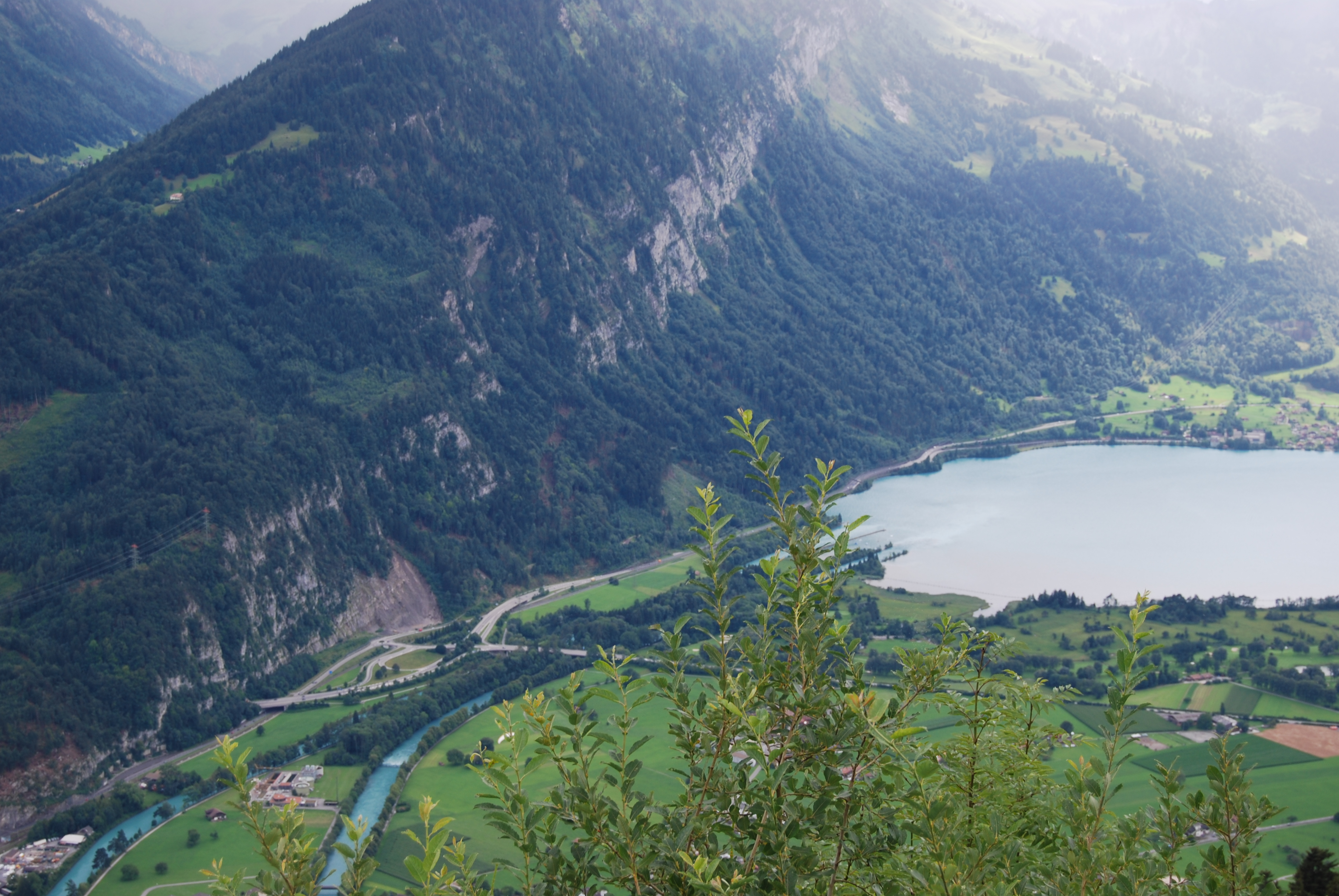
Därligen, Unterseen and Interlaken on Lake Thun

Aerial view (1956)

Därligen lies in the Bernese Oberland at the south shore of Lake Thun. The town is located at the lake shore at the mouth of the Aare River canal, while the municipality reaches to the Därliggrat ridge. The town has a railway station.

Därligen has an area of 6.93 km^{2} (2.68 sq mi). Of this area, 1.35 km^{2} (0.52 mi^{2}) or 19.5% is used for agricultural purposes, while 4.52 km^{2} (1.75 mi^{2}) or 65.4% is forested. Of the rest of the land, 0.4 km^{2} (0.15 mi^{2}) or 5.8% is settled (buildings or roads), 0.03 km^{2} (7.4 acres) or 0.4% is either rivers or lakes and 0.55 km^{2} (0.21 mi^{2}) or 8.0% is unproductive land.

Of the built up area, housing and buildings made up 1.7% and transportation infrastructure made up 3.3%. Out of the forested land, 58.5% of the total land area is heavily forested and 5.6% is covered with orchards or small clusters of trees. Of the agricultural land, 9.1% is pastures and 10.3% is used for alpine pastures. All the water in the municipality is flowing water. Of the unproductive areas, 4.6% is unproductive vegetation and 3.3% is too rocky for vegetation.

On 31 December 2009 Amtsbezirk Interlaken, the municipality's former district, was dissolved. On the following day, 1 January 2010, it joined the newly created Verwaltungskreis Interlaken-Oberhasli.

== Coat of arms ==
The blazon of the municipal coat of arms is Azure on a Base wavy argent lined Sable a Sail Boat Or sailed Argent.

== Demographics ==
Därligen has a population (as of December 2020) of 415. As of 2010, 9.4% of the population are resident foreign nationals. Over the last 10 years (2000-2010) the population has changed at a rate of 13.3%. Migration accounted for 17.1%, while births and deaths accounted for -3.3%.

Most of the population (as of 2000) speaks German (338 or 94.2%) as their first language, Albanian is the second most common (7 or 1.9%) and French is the third (6 or 1.7%). There are 2 people who speak Italian and 1 person who speaks Romansh.

As of 2008, the population was 47.5% male and 52.5% female. The population was made up of 176 Swiss men (42.6% of the population) and 20 (4.8%) non-Swiss men. There were 198 Swiss women (47.9%) and 19 (4.6%) non-Swiss women. Of the population in the municipality, 120 or about 33.4% were born in Därligen and lived there in 2000. There were 152 or 42.3% who were born in the same canton, while 51 or 14.2% were born somewhere else in Switzerland, and 25 or 7.0% were born outside of Switzerland.

As of 2010, children and teenagers (0–19 years old) make up 20.6% of the population, while adults (20–64 years old) make up 62.7% and seniors (over 64 years old) make up 16.7%.

As of 2000, there were 128 people who were single and never married in the municipality. There were 180 married individuals, 31 widows or widowers and 20 individuals who are divorced.

As of 2000, there were 60 households that consist of only one person and 8 households with five or more people. In 2000, a total of 139 apartments (66.8% of the total) were permanently occupied, while 47 apartments (22.6%) were seasonally occupied and 22 apartments (10.6%) were empty. As of 2010, the construction rate of new housing units was 2.4 new units per 1000 residents. The vacancy rate for the municipality, in 2011, was 0.7%.

The historical population is given in the following chart:

== Politics ==
In the 2011 federal election the most popular party was the Swiss People's Party (SVP) which received 32% of the vote. The next three most popular parties were the Conservative Democratic Party (BDP) (19.6%), the Social Democratic Party (SP) (18.6%) and the Green Party (7.1%). In the federal election, a total of 128 votes were cast, and the voter turnout was 40.6%.

== Economy ==
As of 2011, Därligen had an unemployment rate of 2.99%. As of 2008, there were a total of 61 people employed in the municipality. Of these, there were 18 people employed in the primary economic sector and about 7 businesses involved in this sector. 6 people were employed in the secondary sector and there were 5 businesses in this sector. 37 people were employed in the tertiary sector, with 12 businesses in this sector. There were 191 residents of the municipality who were employed in some capacity, of which females made up 45.0% of the workforce.

In 2008 there were a total of 38 full-time equivalent jobs. The number of jobs in the primary sector was 7, all in agriculture. The number of jobs in the secondary sector was 6 of which 3 were in manufacturing and 2 were in construction. The number of jobs in the tertiary sector was 25. In the tertiary sector; 10 or 40.0% were in a hotel or restaurant, 8 or 32.0% were technical professionals or scientists, 3 or 12.0% were in education.

In 2000, there were 37 workers who commuted into the municipality and 159 workers who commuted away. The municipality is a net exporter of workers, with about 4.3 workers leaving the municipality for every one entering. Of the working population, 17.3% used public transportation to get to work, and 66% used a private car.

== Religion ==
From the 2000 census, 38 or 10.6% were Roman Catholic, while 278 or 77.4% belonged to the Swiss Reformed Church. Of the rest of the population, there were 32 individuals (or about 8.91% of the population) who belonged to another Christian church. There were 8 (or about 2.23% of the population) who were Islamic. There were 1 individual who belonged to another church. 11 (or about 3.06% of the population) belonged to no church, are agnostic or atheist, and 7 individuals (or about 1.95% of the population) did not answer the question.

== Transport ==
Därligen has regular bus service to Spiez and Interlaken. It formerly had rail service at Därligen railway station on Lake Thun line.
