= Burglauenen railway station =

Railway station in Switzerland

Burglauenen
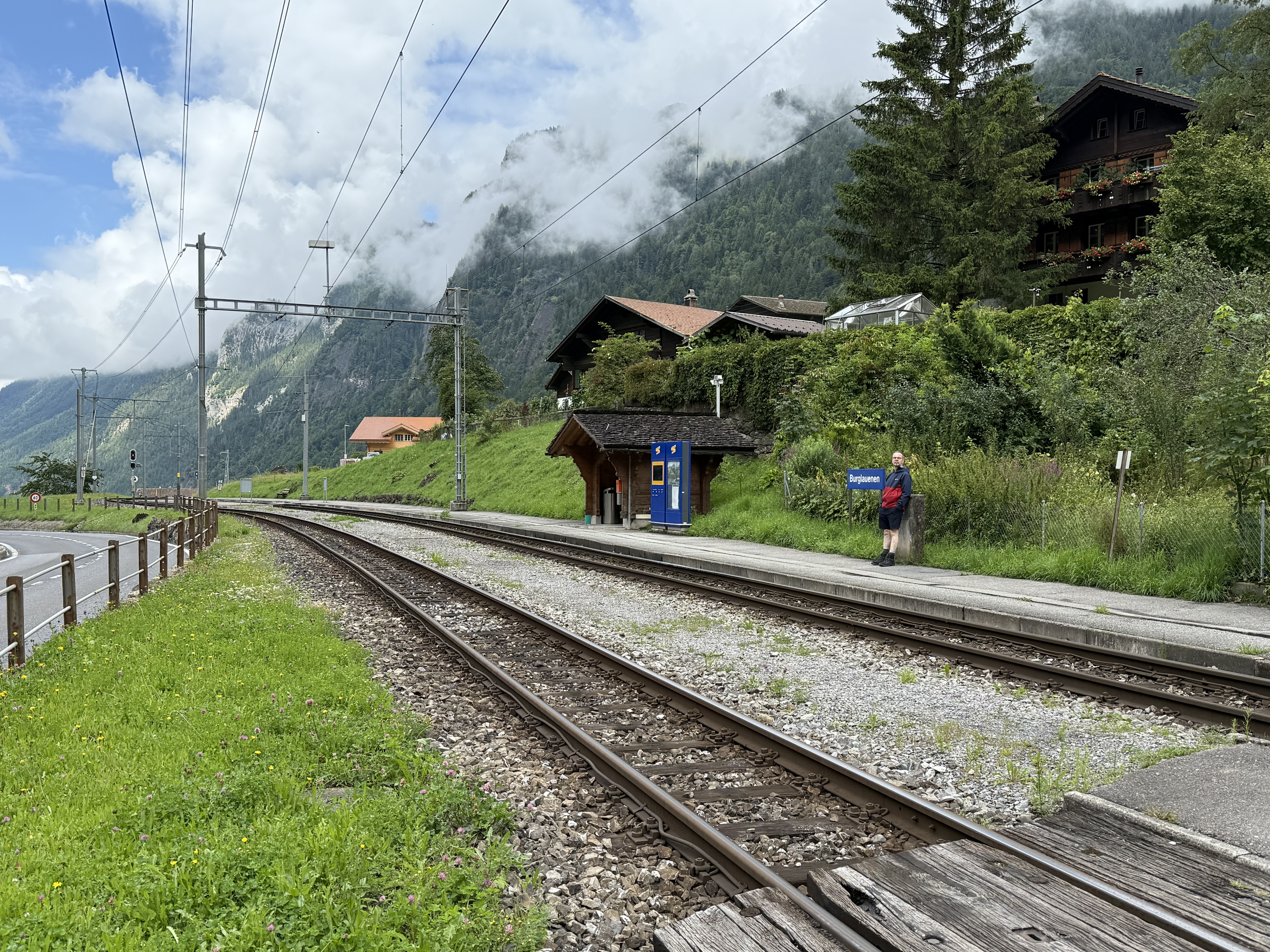
- The station in 2025

General information
- Location: Grindelwaldstrasse; Grindelwald, Bern; Switzerland
- Coordinates: 46°38′09″N 7°58′31″E
- Elevation: 896 m (2,940 ft)
- Owner: Berner Oberland-Bahnen
- Line: Bernese Oberland line
- Distance: 14.5 km (9.0 mi) from Interlaken Ost
- Platforms: 1
- Train operators: Berner Oberland-Bahnen

Other information
- Fare zone: 821 (Libero)

History
- Opened: 1 July 1890
- Electrified: 17 March 1914

Services
Preceding station	Berner Oberland-Bahnen AG	Following station
Lütschental towards Interlaken Ost	Bernese Oberland Railway	Schwendi towards Grindelwald
Location

Burglauenen railway station (German: Bahnhof Burglauenen) is a railway station in the municipality of Grindelwald in the Swiss canton of Bern. The station is on the Berner Oberland Bahn, whose trains operate services to Interlaken Ost and Grindelwald. It takes its name from the nearby settlement of Burglauenen.

== Services ==
As of the December 2020 timetable change, the following rail services stop at Burglauenen:

- Regio: half-hourly service between Interlaken Ost and Grindelwald.
