= Schwendi bei Grindelwald railway station =

Railway station in Switzerland

Schwendi bei Grindelwald
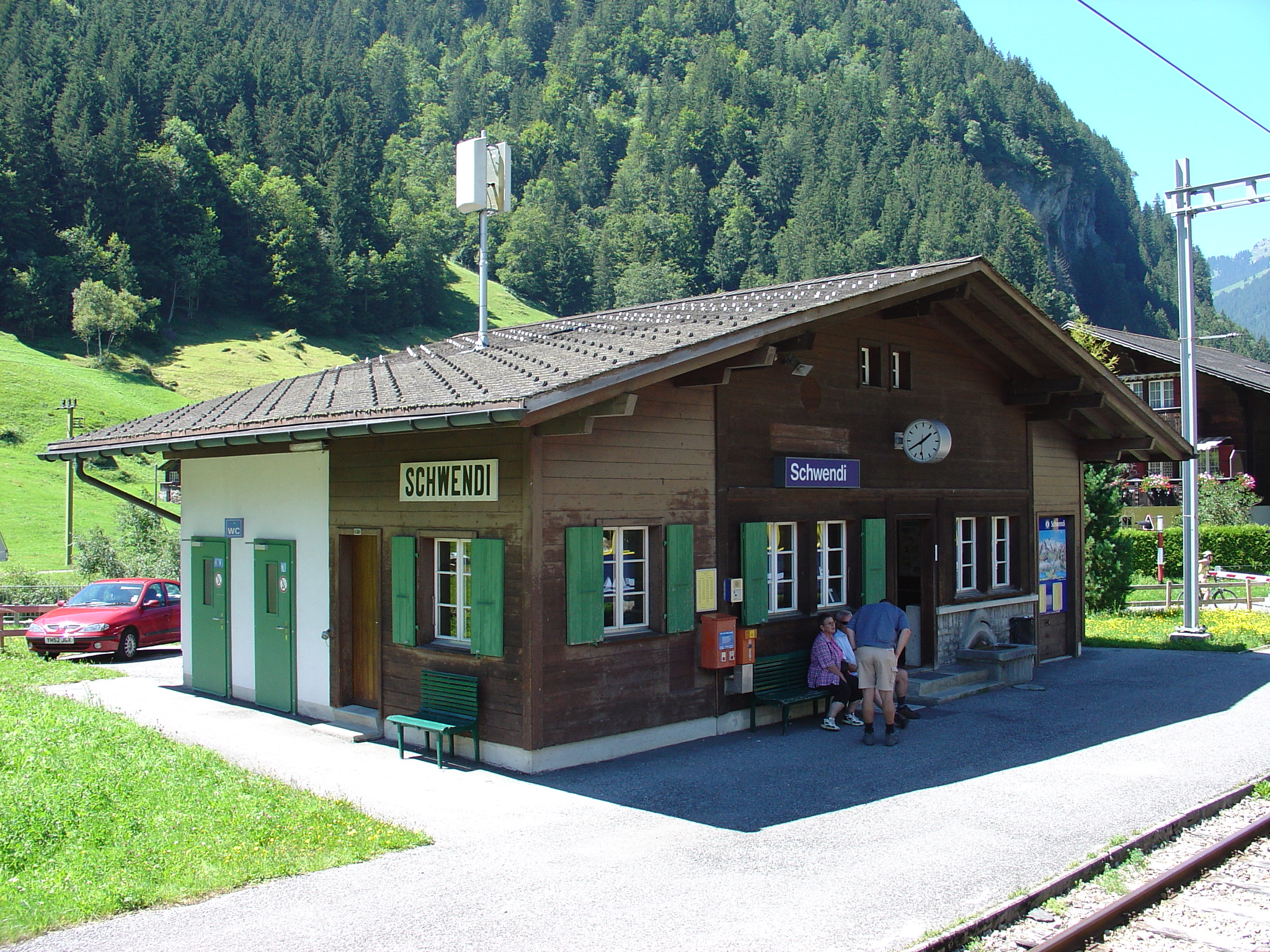
- The station building in 2007

General information
- Location: Schwendistrasse; Grindelwald, Bern; Switzerland
- Coordinates: 46°37′50″N 8°00′11″E
- Elevation: 919 m (3,015 ft)
- Owner: Berner Oberland-Bahnen
- Line: Bernese Oberland line
- Distance: 16.8 km (10.4 mi) from Interlaken Ost
- Platforms: 1
- Train operators: Berner Oberland-Bahnen

Other information
- Fare zone: 821 (Libero)

History
- Opened: 1 July 1890
- Electrified: 17 March 1914

Services
Preceding station	Berner Oberland-Bahnen AG	Following station
Burglauenen towards Interlaken Ost	Bernese Oberland Railway	Grindelwald Terminal towards Grindelwald
Location

Schwendi bei Grindelwald railway station (German: Bahnhof Schwendi bei Grindelwald is a railway station in the municipality of Grindelwald in the Swiss canton of Bern. The station is on the Berner Oberland Bahn, whose trains operate services to Interlaken Ost and Grindelwald. It takes its name from the nearby settlement of Schwendi.

== Services ==
As of the December 2020 timetable change, the following services stop at Schwendi bei Grindelwald:

- Regio: half-hourly service between Interlaken Ost and Grindelwald.
