= Matten bei Interlaken railway station =

Railway station in Switzerland

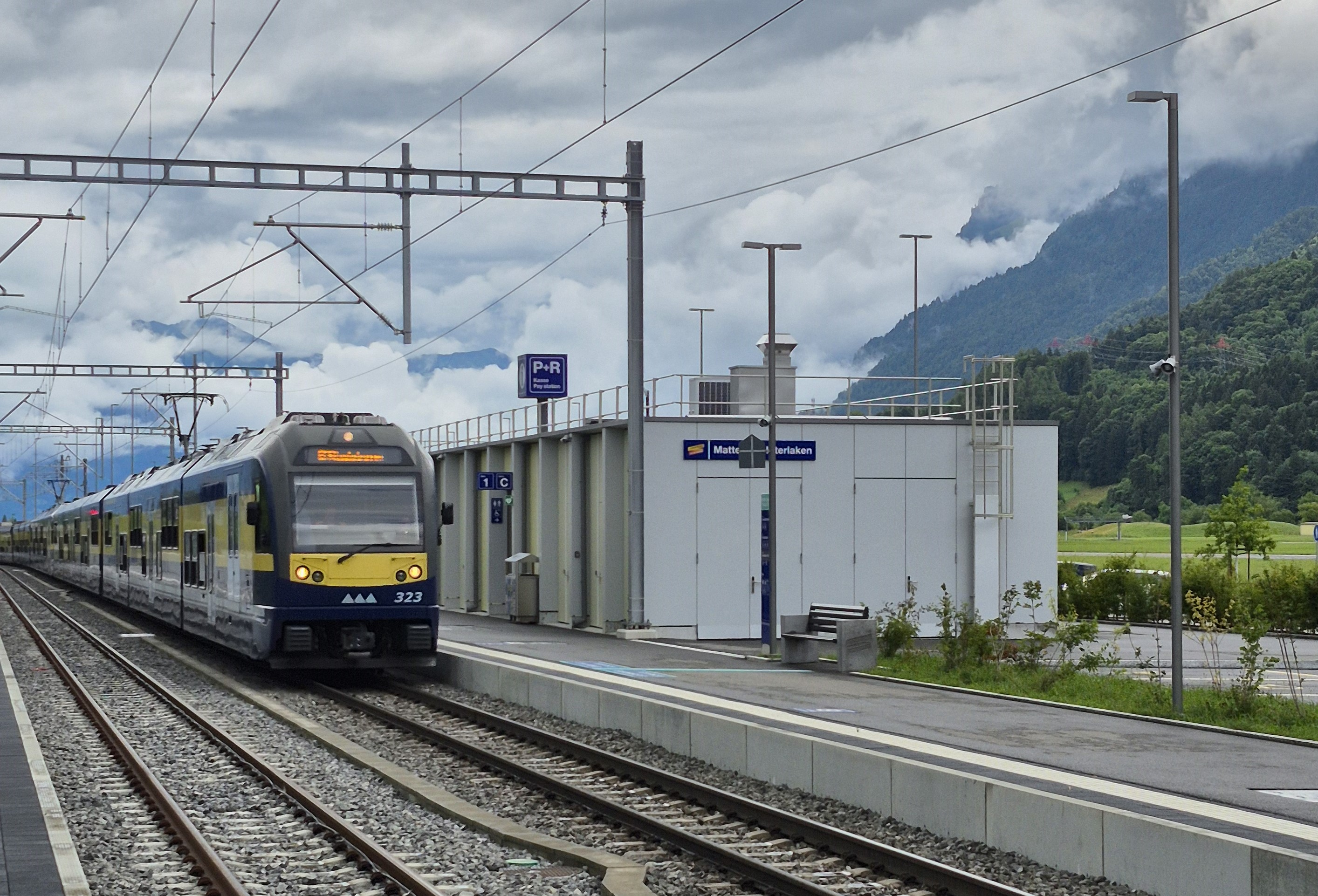
- Matten bei Interlaken railway station in 2025

General information
- Location: Industriestrasse 1, 3812 Wilderswil; Switzerland
- Owner: Berner Oberland-Bahnen
- Operator: Jungfraubahn AG
- Line: Bernese Oberland line
- Distance: 2.1 km (1.3 mi) from Interlaken Ost
- Platforms: 2
- Train operators: Berner Oberland-Bahnen

Construction
- Parking: Yes
- Cycle facilities: Yes

Other information
- Fare zone: 750 (Libero)

History
- Opened: 9 December 2023

Services
Preceding station	Berner Oberland-Bahnen AG	Following station
Interlaken Ost Terminus	Bernese Oberland Railway	Wilderswil towards Lauterbrunnen or Grindelwald
Location

Matten bei Interlaken railway station (German: Haltestelle Matten bei Interlaken) is a railway station in the municipality of Matten bei Interlaken, in the Swiss canton of Bern. The station was opened in December 2023.

== History ==
In June 2020, plans were submitted for a new stop on the Berner Oberland Bahn line between Interlaken and Wilderswil. By September 2022, plans were approved including a station and park and ride facility to be constructed next to the former Interlaken Airport site. Two months later, ground was broken on the new stop and by April 2023, the new switches were installed for train traffic to be accepted which resulted in the line being closed between Interlaken and Grindelwald.

The facility officially opened on 9th December 2023, with timetabled passenger services beginning the following day. The entire project cost 19.5m CHF.

== Facilities ==
The station features two 260m platforms, alongside a reception building which is divided into a public section (waiting room and toilet facilities) and a technical and storage section (2 technical rooms, cleaning room and storage rooms). There is also a large park and ride facility with parking for 207 vehicles. More than 12,400 vehicles used the parking at the station in 2024.

== Services ==
The following services stop at Matten b Interlaken:

- Regio:
  - half-hourly service between Interlaken Ost and Lauterbrunnen or Grindelwald and Grindelwald Terminal; trains operate combined between Interlaken Ost and Zweilütschinen.
