= Matten bei Interlaken =

- Municipality
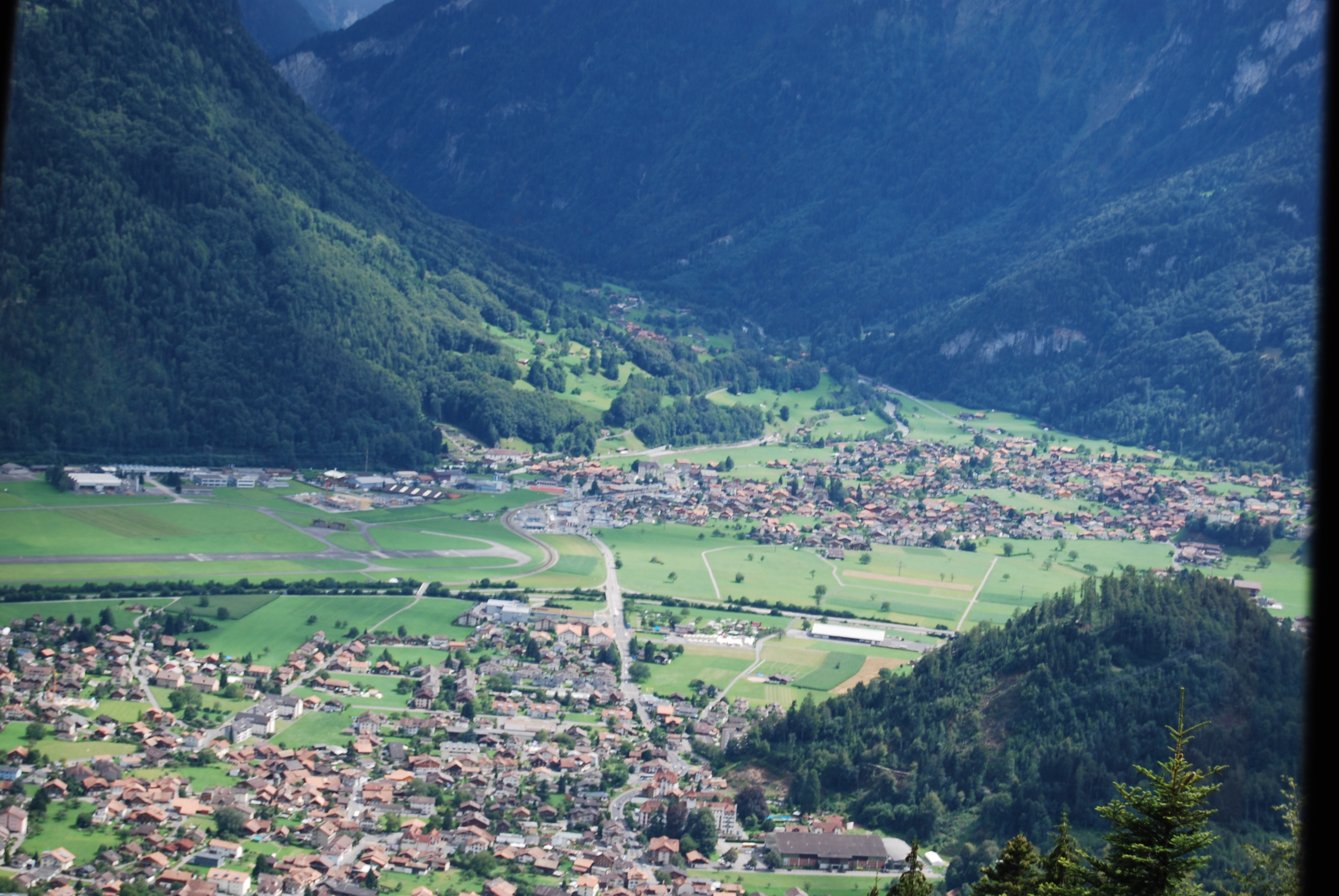
- Matten b.I. on the left of the Chli Chrugge and Wilderswil in the back

- Flag Coat of arms
- Location of Matten bei Interlaken
- Location within Switzerland Location within Canton of Bern
- Coordinates: 46°40′25″N 7°52′27″E
- Country: Switzerland
- Canton: Bern
- District: Interlaken-Oberhasli

Government
  - Executive: Gemeinderat with 7 members
  - Mayor: Gemeindepräsident(in); Lisa Randazzo-Anneler (as of 2026)

Area
  - Total: 5.9 km^{2} (2.3 sq mi)
- Elevation: 575 m (1,886 ft)

Population (December 2020)
  - Total: 4,060
  - Density: 690/km^{2} (1,800/sq mi)
- Time zone: UTC+01:00 (CET)
  - Summer (DST): UTC+02:00 (CEST)
- Postal code: 3800
- SFOS number: 587
- ISO 3166 code: CH-BE
- Surrounded by: Interlaken, Bönigen, Gsteigwiler, Wilderswil and Därligen
- Website: https://www.matten.ch/

Matten bei Interlaken (abbreviated as Matten b.I., or simply Matten) is a village and municipality in the Interlaken-Oberhasli administrative district in the canton of Bern in Switzerland.

Matten b.I. belongs to the Small Agglomeration Interlaken with 23,300 inhabitants (2014).

== Etymology ==
Matten is a native field name, going back to the Old High German matta- ("meadow").

== History ==
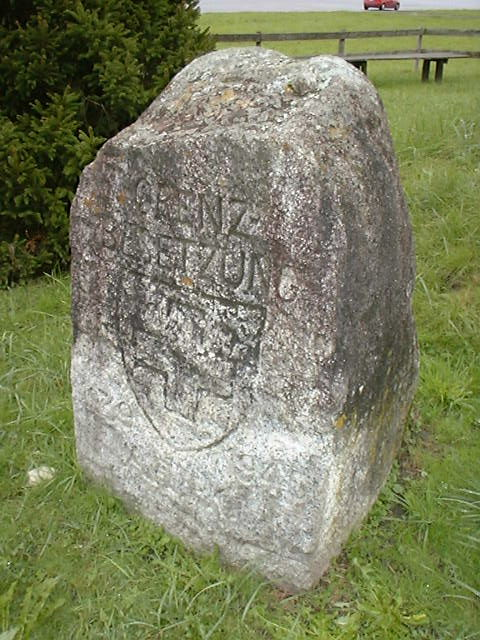
This stone inscribed "frontier defence 1939-1945" stands between the airbase and the Lütschine river

Matten bei Interlaken is first mentioned in 1133 as inter lacus Madon.

The oldest trace of a settlement in the area are some Roman coins and fragments of a Roman road. During the Early Middle Ages there was a graveyard and probably a village in the area.

In the seventh century, Alemanni first settled in the modern municipal area, pushing out the Celts into the surrounding valleys. The first documented reference to the town, in the phrase inter lacus Madon, was on 8 November 1133 in a letter from Lothair III, Holy Roman Emperor. It is known that many residents of Matten served as soldiers in service of a foreign power.

Between 1300 and 1310 Interlaken Monastery acquired the village and bailiwick from other local nobles. The Monastery held the village for about two centuries. In 1528, the city of Bern adopted the new faith of the Protestant Reformation and began imposing it on the Bernese Oberland. Matten joined many other villages and the Monastery in an unsuccessful rebellion against the new faith. After Bern imposed its will on the Oberland, they secularized the Monastery and annexed all the Monastery lands. Matten became a part of the Bernese bailiwick of Interlaken.

A milestone in the history of the place was the first Unspunnenfest in 1805. The Rugenbräu brewery opened in the village in 1866. As tourism to the Bernese Oberland increased in the course of the nineteenth century, Matten profited, and the large hotels Jungfraublick (1863) and Mattenhof (1870) were built. The latter served as a military hospital in World War II. The tourist industry reached its peak around 1910, then began to decline during the two World Wars and the Great Depression.

During World War II, an airbase was built in the municipality. For its construction, a large portion of the southeastern part of the municipality was drained. Today, although there is still a tarmac strip, this area no longer serves a military purpose and it is now used for cattle grazing. Other large events take advantage of the large flattened area as well, such as the Country- und Trucker Festival and the Greenfield Festival. Erich von Däniken's Mystery Park was also built on the former airbase land.

== Geography ==
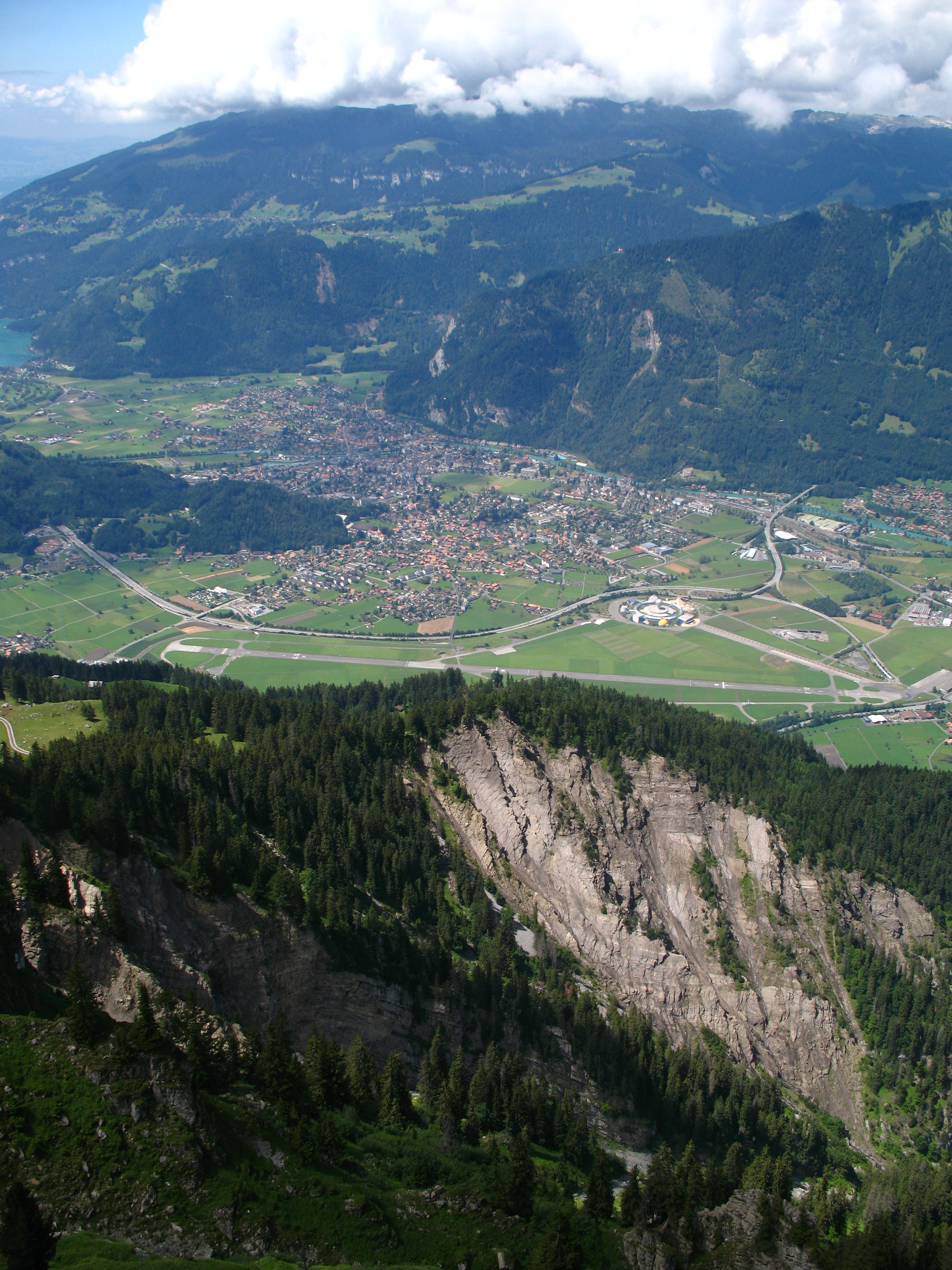
View of Matten b.I. in front of the Chli Chrugge, Interlaken, and Unterseen

Matten bei Interlaken has an area of 5.91 km^{2} (2.28 sq mi). Of this area, 1.26 km^{2} (0.49 mi^{2}) or 21.4% is used for agricultural purposes, while 3.37 km^{2} (1.30 mi^{2}) or 57.1% is forested. Of the rest of the land, 1.25 km^{2} (0.48 mi^{2}) or 21.2% is settled (buildings or roads), 0.07 km^{2} (17 acres) or 1.2% is either rivers or lakes and 0.02 km^{2} (4.9 acres) or 0.3% is unproductive land.

Of the built up area, industrial buildings made up 1.2% of the total area while housing and buildings made up 9.5% and transportation infrastructure made up 7.6%. while parks, green belts and sports fields made up 2.2%. Out of the forested land, 55.9% of the total land area is heavily forested and 1.2% is covered with orchards or small clusters of trees. Of the agricultural land, 2.0% is used for growing crops and 18.6% is pastures. All the water in the municipality is flowing water.

Matten bei Interlaken lies in the Bernese Oberland in the Alps, in the Bödeli (the tongue of land between of Lake Thun and Lake Brienz). In the West, Matten borders on the foothills of the Abendberg Ridge, the Kleinen Rugen and the Grossen Rugen. The municipality includes the village and the exclave of Änderberg.

Matten bei Interlaken, like eight adjacent municipalities, belongs to the church parish Gsteig bei Interlaken, a village in Gsteigwiler.

On 31 December 2009 Amtsbezirk Interlaken, the municipality's former district, was dissolved. On the following day, 1 January 2010, it joined the newly created Verwaltungskreis Interlaken-Oberhasli.

== Coat of arms ==
The blazon of the municipal coat of arms is Vert a Bar enbatteled Argent between three Mullets Or.

== Demographics ==
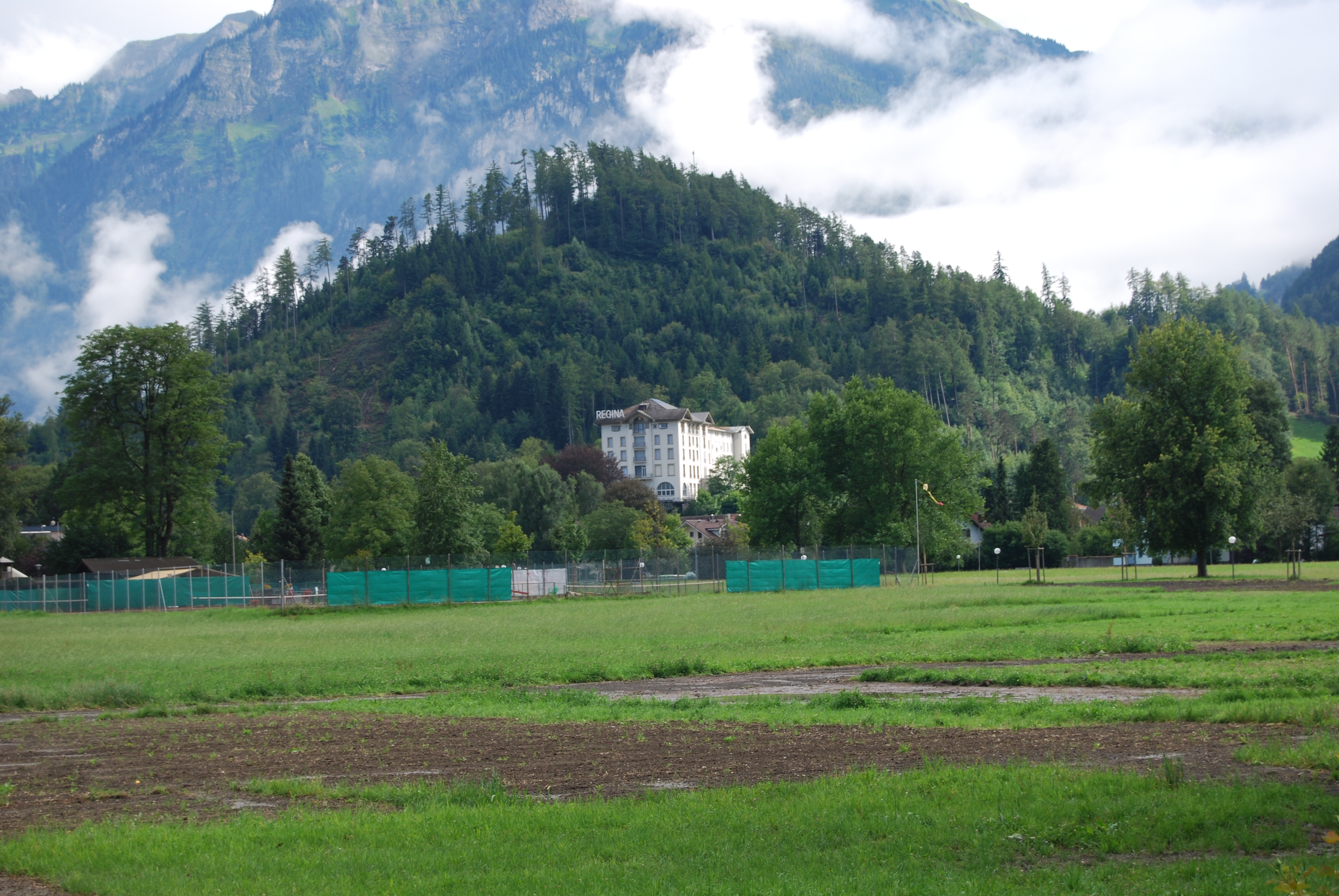
Hotel Regina in Matten

Historical population
Year	Pop.	±%
1850	795	—
1860	914	+15.0%
1870	1,299	+42.1%
1880	1,357	+4.5%
1888	1,345	−0.9%
1900	1,602	+19.1%
1910	2,042	+27.5%
1920	1,909	−6.5%
1930	1,813	−5.0%
1941	1,940	+7.0%
1950	2,183	+12.5%
1960	2,325	+6.5%
1970	2,767	+19.0%
1980	2,936	+6.1%
1990	3,245	+10.5%
2000	3,671	+13.1%
2010	3,781	+3.0%
2020	4,060	+7.4%
Source: Federal Statistical Office

Matten bei Interlaken has a population (as of December 2020) of 4,060. As of 2010, 15.4% of the population are resident foreign nationals. Over the last 10 years (2000-2010) the population has changed at a rate of 3.9%. Migration accounted for -2.5%, while births and deaths accounted for -1%.

Most of the population (as of 2000) speaks German (3,315 or 90.3%) as their first language, Italian is the second most common (84 or 2.3%) and Serbo-Croatian is the third (51 or 1.4%). There are 32 people who speak French and 2 people who speak Romansh.

As of 2008, the population was 48.1% male and 51.9% female. The population was made up of 1,520 Swiss men (40.2% of the population) and 300 (7.9%) non-Swiss men. There were 1,677 Swiss women (44.4%) and 284 (7.5%) non-Swiss women. Of the population in the municipality, 837 or about 22.8% were born in Matten bei Interlaken and lived there in 2000. There were 1,676 or 45.7% who were born in the same canton, while 495 or 13.5% were born somewhere else in Switzerland, and 551 or 15.0% were born outside of Switzerland.

As of 2010, children and teenagers (0–19 years old) make up 18.7% of the population, while adults (20–64 years old) make up 63% and seniors (over 64 years old) make up 18.3%.

As of 2000, there were 1,550 people who were single and never married in the municipality. There were 1,681 married individuals, 269 widows or widowers and 171 individuals who are divorced.

As of 2000, there were 539 households that consist of only one person and 77 households with five or more people. In 2000, a total of 1,532 apartments (89.7% of the total) were permanently occupied, while 131 apartments (7.7%) were seasonally occupied and 44 apartments (2.6%) were empty. As of 2010, the construction rate of new housing units was 4.2 new units per 1000 residents. The vacancy rate for the municipality, in 2011, was 0.21%.

=== Religion ===
From the 2000 census, 565 or 15.4% were Roman Catholic, while 2,425 or 66.1% belonged to the Swiss Reformed Church. Of the rest of the population, there were 36 members of an Orthodox church (or about 0.98% of the population), there was 1 individual who belongs to the Christian Catholic Church, and there were 367 individuals (or about 10.00% of the population) who belonged to another Christian church. There were 3 individuals (or about 0.08% of the population) who were Jewish, and 110 (or about 3.00% of the population) who were Islamic. There were 8 individuals who were Buddhist, 10 individuals who were Hindu and 2 individuals who belonged to another church. 194 (or about 5.28% of the population) belonged to no church, are agnostic or atheist, and 130 individuals (or about 3.54% of the population) did not answer the question.

== Politics ==
The legislature consists of the municipal assembly. The executive is the municipal council of seven members; in the case of tied votes the mayor becomes the tie-breaker. All of the authorities have additional responsibilities as well.

In the 2011 federal election the most popular party was the Swiss People's Party (SVP) which received 31% of the vote. The next three most popular parties were the Social Democratic Party (SP) (19.4%), the Conservative Democratic Party (BDP) (17.9%) and the FDP.The Liberals (9.2%). In the federal election, a total of 1,241 votes were cast, and the voter turnout was 45.6%.

Because of the growth of the municipalities Unterseen, Interlaken, and Matten into one another, their economies have also become tightly interconnected. For all of them, tourism plays an important role. In Matten, the Balmers Herberge is well known to backpackers. The Tell Freilichtspiele, located within the municipality, attracts thousands of tourists in summer. Along with Mystery Park, it is one of Matten's most famous tourist attractions.

With the closing of the airbase, Matten and the Bödeli region as a whole lost many valuable jobs. Although the area is still characterized by agriculture, only 4% of the workforce is employed in the sector.

== Economy ==
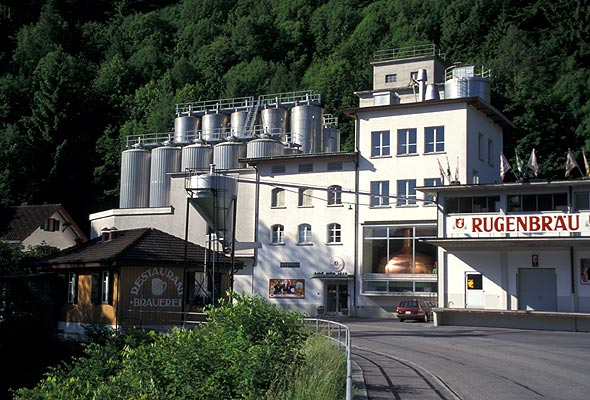
The Rugenbräu brewery in Matten

As of 2011, Matten bei Interlaken had an unemployment rate of 1.93%. As of 2008, there were a total of 1,026 people employed in the municipality. Of these, there were 32 people employed in the primary economic sector and about 14 businesses involved in this sector. 165 people were employed in the secondary sector and there were 23 businesses in this sector. 829 people were employed in the tertiary sector, with 111 businesses in this sector. There were 1,960 residents of the municipality who were employed in some capacity, of which females made up 45.8% of the workforce.

In 2008 there were a total of 829 full-time equivalent jobs. The number of jobs in the primary sector was 16, all of which were in agriculture. The number of jobs in the secondary sector was 158 of which 93 or (58.9%) were in manufacturing and 65 (41.1%) were in construction. The number of jobs in the tertiary sector was 655. In the tertiary sector; 205 or 31.3% were in wholesale or retail sales or the repair of motor vehicles, 46 or 7.0% were in the movement and storage of goods, 116 or 17.7% were in a hotel or restaurant, 17 or 2.6% were in the information industry, 103 or 15.7% were technical professionals or scientists, 44 or 6.7% were in education and 52 or 7.9% were in health care.

In 2000, there were 566 workers who commuted into the municipality and 1,531 workers who commuted away. The municipality is a net exporter of workers, with about 2.7 workers leaving the municipality for every one entering. Of the working population, 10.9% used public transportation to get to work, and 40.6% used a private car.

== Sights ==
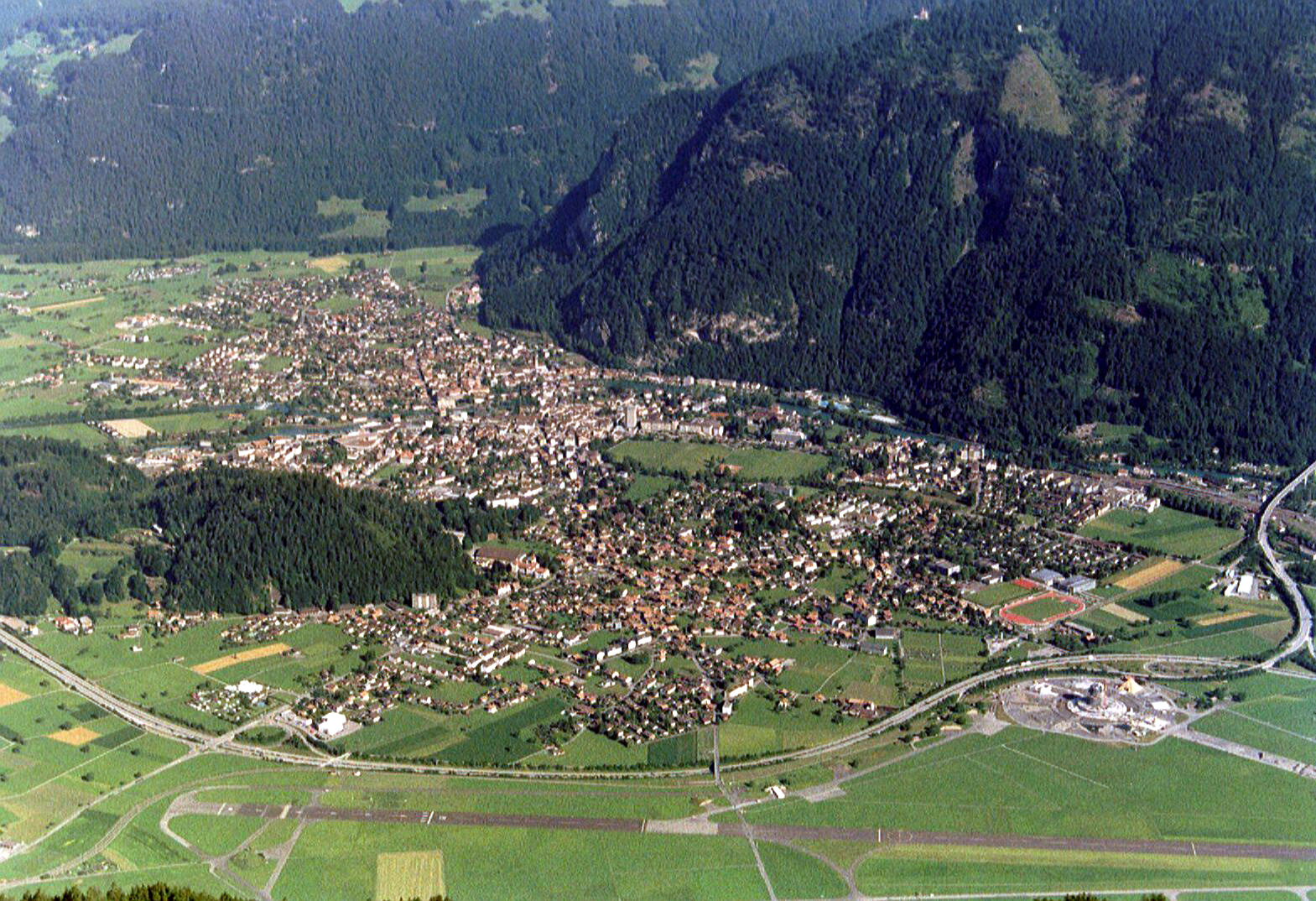
View of Unterseen, Interlaken, and Matten

- Eiger, Mönch and Jungfrau, part of the Jungfrau-Aletsch-Bietschhorn UNESCO World Heritage Site
- Lake Thun and Lake Brienz
- Tell Freilichtspiele
- Kunsteisbahn
- Loop road to the kleinen Rugen
- The Schynige Platte (via the Schynige Platte Railway) provides a scenic view of Interlaken and the surrounding mountains
- The Harderkulm via the Harderbahn
- Mystery Park
- Greenfield Festival
- Trucker and Country Music Festival

== Transportation ==
- Matten bei Interlaken railway station (opened December 2023)
- PostBus Switzerland

== Education ==
In Matten bei Interlaken about 1,626 or (44.3%) of the population have completed non-mandatory upper secondary education, and 339 or (9.2%) have completed additional higher education (either university or a Fachhochschule). Of the 339 who completed tertiary schooling, 66.7% were Swiss men, 20.6% were Swiss women, 7.4% were non-Swiss men and 5.3% were non-Swiss women.

The Canton of Bern school system provides one year of non-obligatory Kindergarten, followed by six years of Primary school. This is followed by three years of obligatory lower Secondary school where the students are separated according to ability and aptitude. Following the lower Secondary students may attend additional schooling or they may enter an apprenticeship.

During the 2010–11 school year, there were a total of 348 students attending classes in Matten bei Interlaken. There were 3 kindergarten classes with a total of 55 students in the municipality. Of the kindergarten students, 16.4% were permanent or temporary residents of Switzerland (not citizens) and 21.8% have a different mother language than the classroom language. The municipality had 11 primary classes and 187 students. Of the primary students, 16.6% were permanent or temporary residents of Switzerland (not citizens) and 20.3% have a different mother language than the classroom language. During the same year, there were 6 lower secondary classes with a total of 106 students. There were 14.2% who were permanent or temporary residents of Switzerland (not citizens) and 23.6% have a different mother language than the classroom language.

As of 2000, there were 24 students in Matten bei Interlaken who came from another municipality, while 133 residents attended schools outside the municipality.
