= Zweilütschinen railway station =

Railway station in the municipality of Gündlischwand, Switzerland

Zweilütschinen
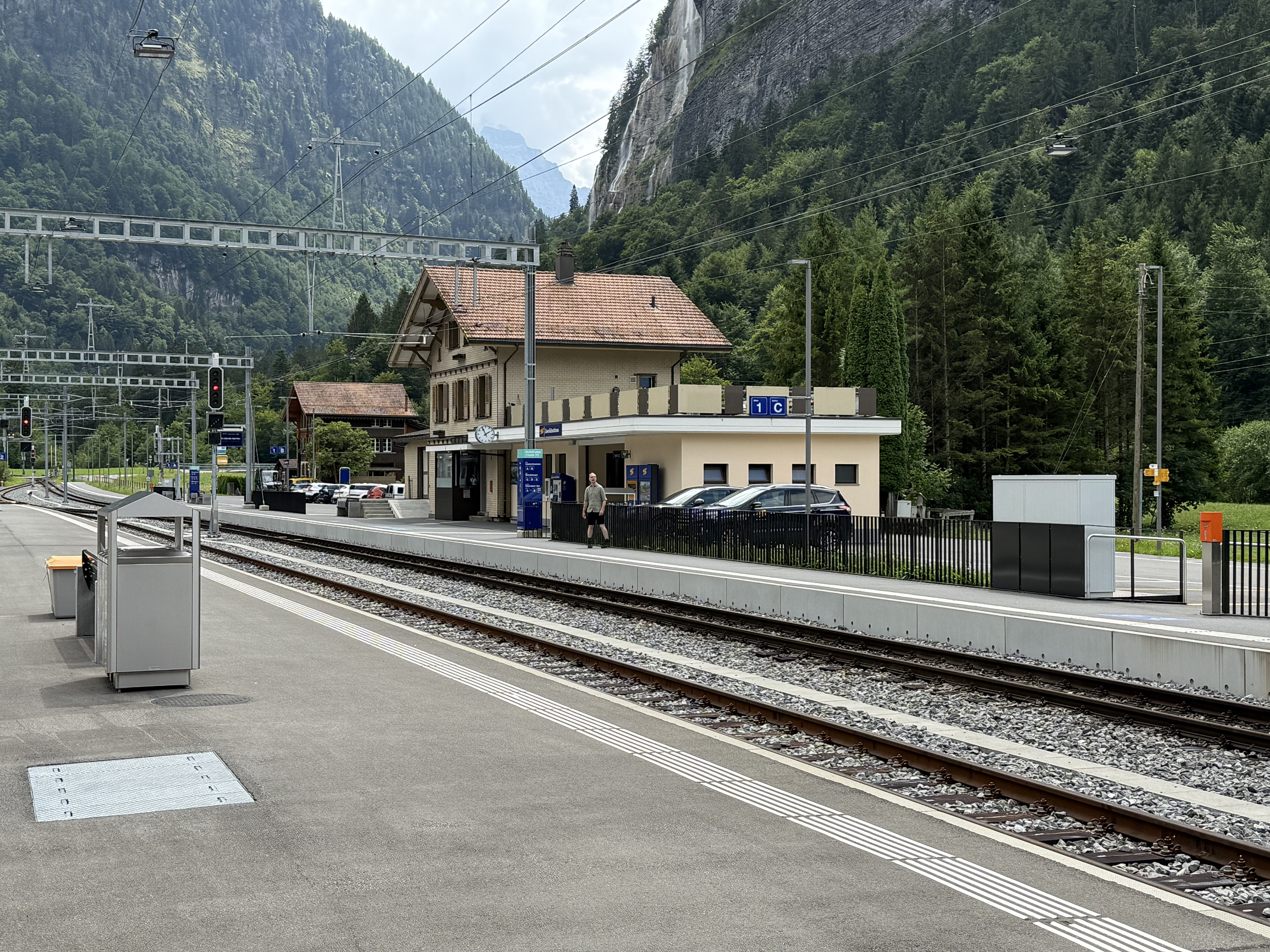
- The station in 2025

General information
- Location: Gündlischwand, Bern; Switzerland
- Coordinates: 46°37′58″N 7°53′59″E
- Elevation: 651 m (2,136 ft)
- Owner: Berner Oberland-Bahnen
- Line: Bernese Oberland line
- Distance: 8.2 km (5.1 mi) from Interlaken Ost
- Platforms: 2
- Train operators: Berner Oberland-Bahnen

Other information
- Fare zone: 820 (Libero)

History
- Opened: 1 July 1890
- Electrified: 17 March 1914

Services
Preceding station	Berner Oberland-Bahnen AG	Following station
Wilderswil towards Interlaken Ost	Bernese Oberland Railway	Lauterbrunnen Terminus
Wilderswil towards Interlaken Ost	Bernese Oberland Railway	Lütschental towards Grindelwald
Location

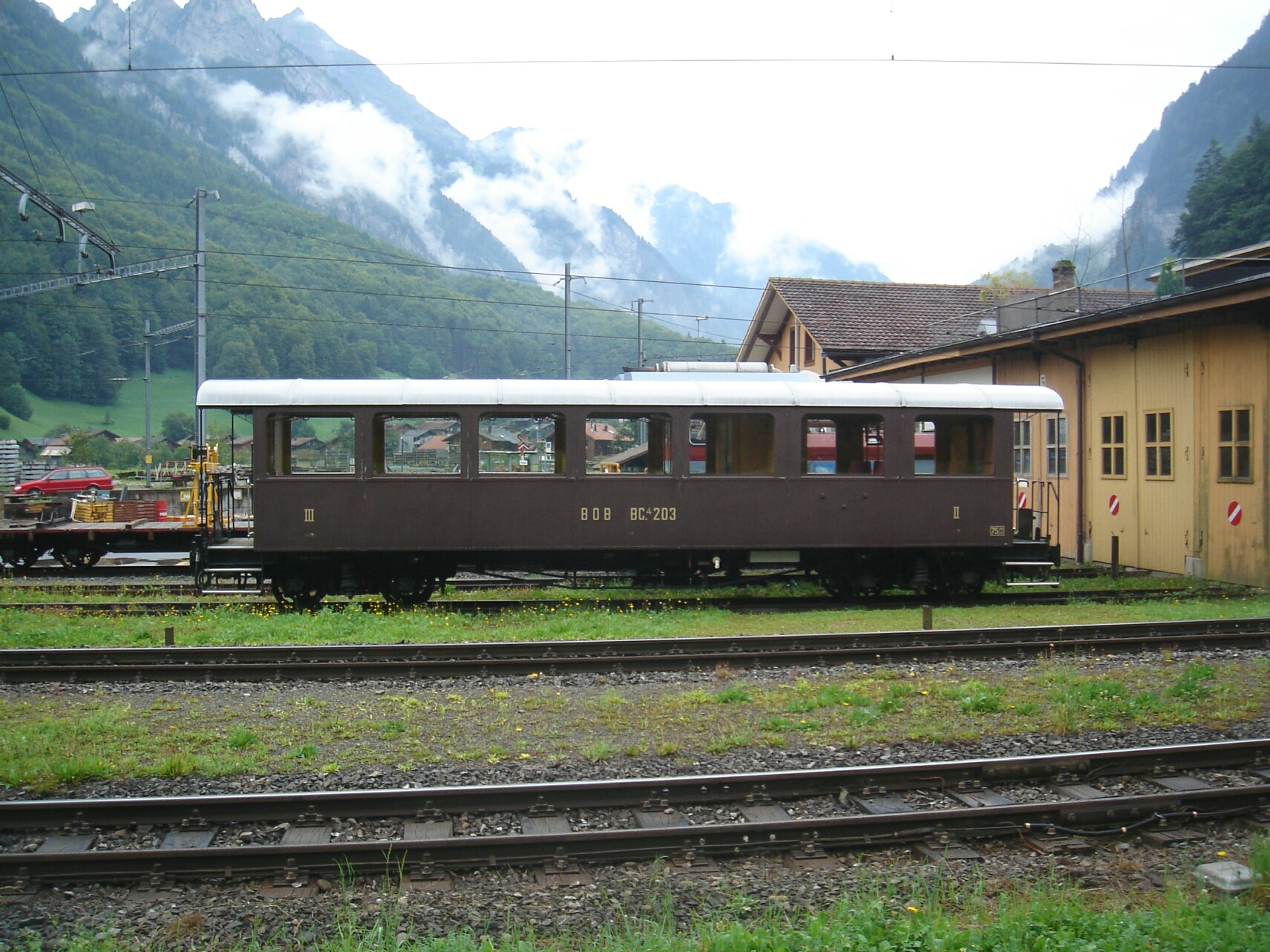
A historic coach outside the depot.

Zweilütschinen railway station (German: Bahnhof Zweilütschinen) is a railway station in the municipality of Gündlischwand in the Swiss canton of Bern. The station is on the Berner Oberland Bahn, whose trains operate services to Interlaken Ost, Grindelwald and Lauterbrunnen. It takes its name from the hamlet of Zweilütschinen, which itself is named after the nearby confluence of the White and the Black branches of the Lütschine river.

The depot and workshops of the Berner Oberland Bahn are located beside the station. The railway's two branches, to Grindelwald and Lauterbrunnen, diverge to the south of the station, following the valleys of the Black and White Lütschine rivers respectively. 17 March 2014 marked the 100th anniversary of the electrification of the line, an event marked with a celebration at the Bahnhof buffet.

== Services ==
As of the December 2020 timetable change, the following rail services stop at Zweilütschinen:

- Regio: half-hourly service between Interlaken Ost and Lauterbrunnen or Grindelwald; trains operate combined between Interlaken Ost and Zweilütschinen.
