= Interlaken Air Base =

Interlaken Airport Flugplatz Interlaken
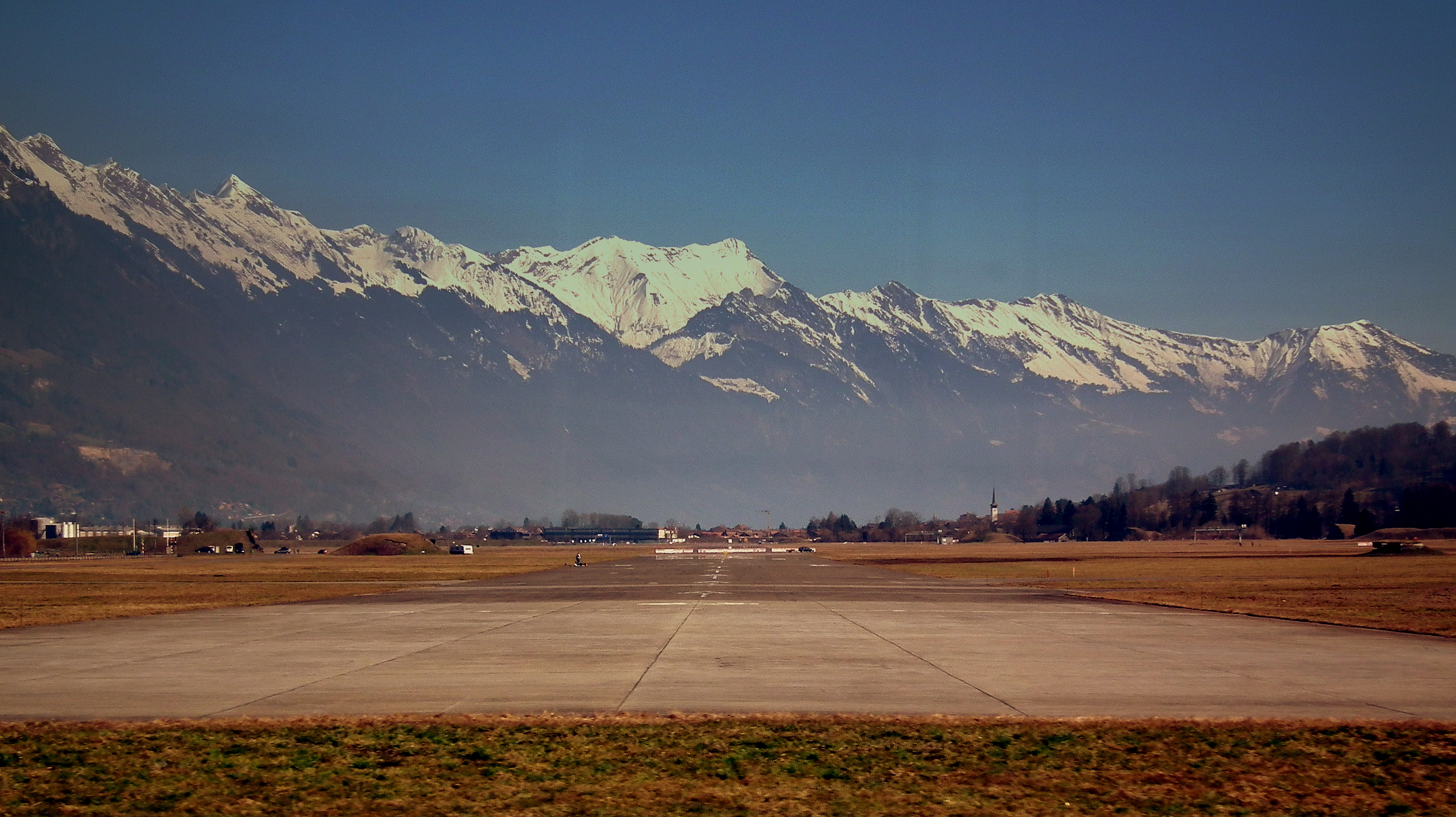
- IATA: none; ICAO: LSMI

Summary
- Airport type: Former military airbase
- Serves: Interlaken
- Location: Interlaken, Switzerland
- Elevation AMSL: 1,893 ft (577 m)
- Coordinates: 46°40′35″N 007°52′44″E

Map
- Location of the airport in Switzerland

Runways
Direction	Length		Surface
Direction	ft	m	Surface
05/23	5,433	1,656	Tarmac

Interlaken Airport (Note: German: Flughafen Interlaken, French: Aéroport de Interlaken, Italian: Aeroporto di Interlaken) (ICAO: LSMI) is a former military airbase in Interlaken, Switzerland. The airbase is now closed to scheduled commercial flights.

== History ==
From 1919, there was a civilian airfield at the site, which was closed during the economic crisis in 1930. The second airfield was built in 1940 during the Second World War as a Swiss Reduit airfield and opened in 1941. The Swiss Air Force operated all aircraft types up to the Northrop F-5 there and from 1947 operated the specialist department for the de Havilland Vampire aircraft. From 1964 to 1967, Globe Air operated charter flights from London to Interlaken during the high season. During the Cold War, Interlaken was used as operation base for Squadron 7 (Hunter) and as a maintenance facility for the aircraft until 1990.

In 1971, Swiss Air Rescue formed a base at the airfield named Wilderswil. Initially based in the military buildings, in 1982 the air rescue moved to a new heliport in Gsteigwiler. However, in 2008 they returned to Interlaken airfield retaining the Wilderswil base name.

In 2003, military use ceased and the airfield was sold.

== Post closure use ==
In 2003, Mystery Park was opened on the site as a theme park based around the author Erich von Däniken. The park closed in 2006, before being purchased by Jakob Dietiker for $13million and renamed Jungfrau Park.

In 2004, the site was considered a potential venue for a permanent motor racing circuit, however this did not materialise, notably as the Swiss government only lifted the ban on motorsport in the country in 2018 ahead of the Zurich ePrix. Motor racing has since taken place on the airfield, notably in 2019, the opening round of the Swiss Slalom motor racing series was held at Interlaken. In summer 2023, an Alfa Romeo owners club meeting at the facility broke a national record for the most vehicles of the brand in one place.

Since 2005, the annual Greenfield music festival takes place at Interlaken.

In 2007, Interlaken Airbase was used for the sixth round of the Red Bull Air Race. It was also used for the 2024 Paragliding World Cup.

In 2023, Matten bei Interlaken railway station opened on the site.

== In popular culture ==
- The airfield was used as a filming location in Band of Brothers.
- A mission in the video game Microsoft Flight Simulator X challenged the player to land an aircraft at Interlaken with a failed engine.

== Photos ==
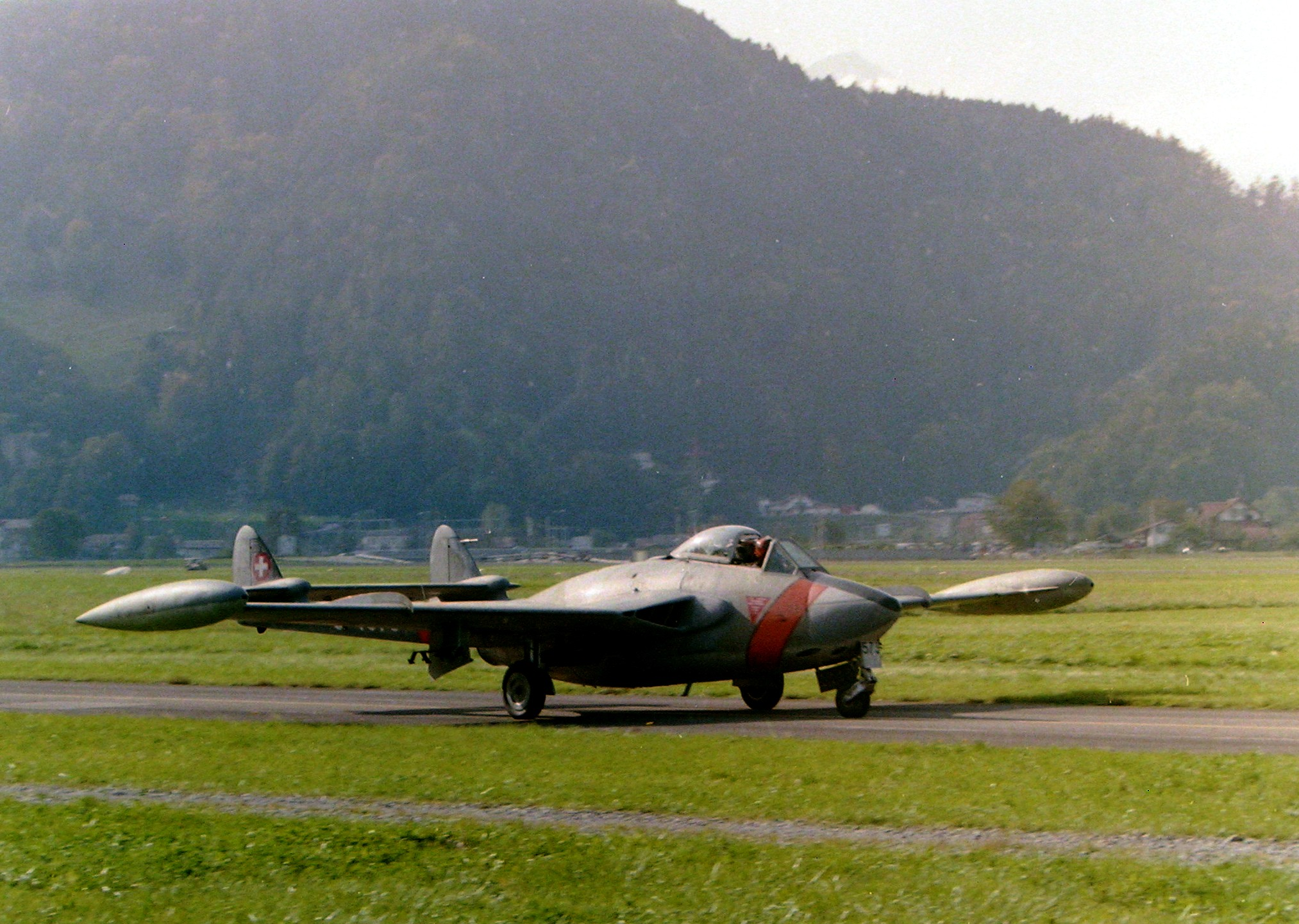
Venom aircraft taxiing at Interlaken air base in October 1983

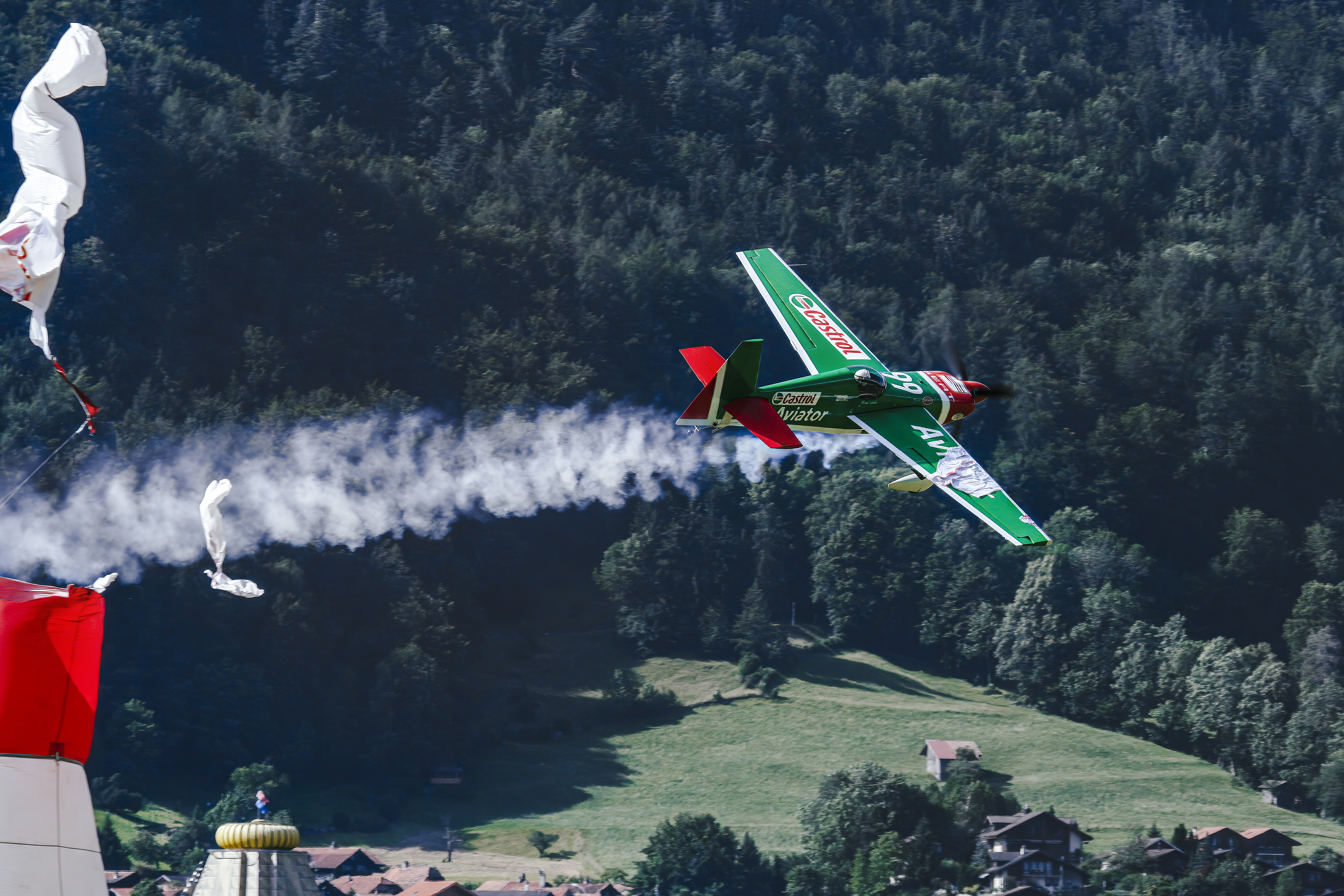
A competitor in the 2007 Red Bull Air race

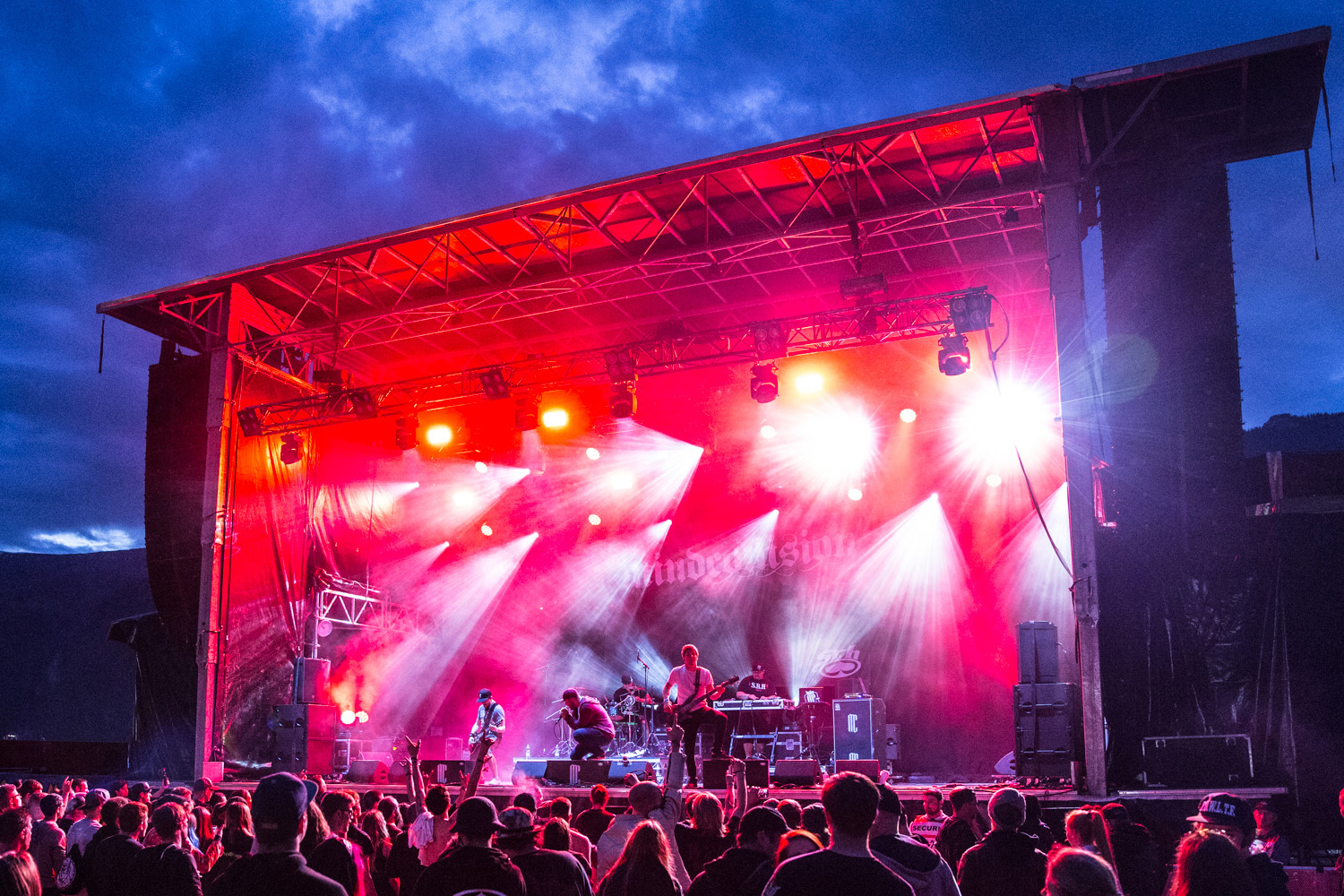
Band Mindcollision performing at Greenfield Festival in 2016
