= Bernese Oberland Railway =

Mountain railway in Switzerland

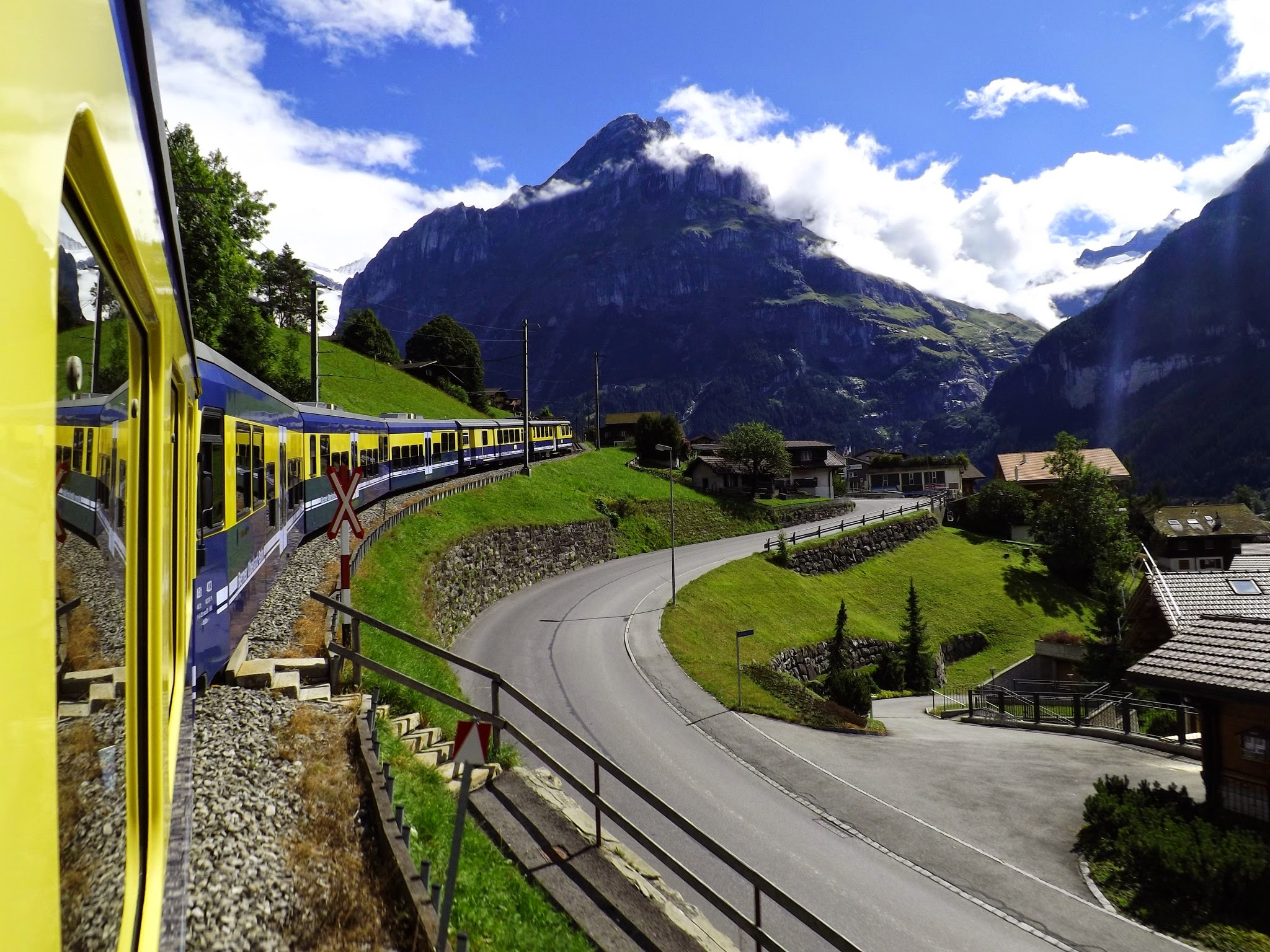
- A BOB train approaches Grindelwald.

Overview
- Native name: Berner Oberland-Bahn BOB
- Status: operating daily
- Owner: Berner Oberland-Bahnen AG
- Locale: Bernese Oberland
- Termini: Interlaken Ost railway station; Grindelwald, Lauterbrunnen
- Stations: 10
- Website: BOB

Service
- Type: Mountain, partially rack railway
- Services: 2
- Operator: BOB

History
- Opened: 1890

Technical
- Line length: 23.69 km (14.72 mi)
- Number of tracks: mostly single track with passing points and a double track section at the lower end.
- Character: Commuter and touristic railway
- Rack system: Riggenbach
- Track gauge: 1,000 mm (3 ft 3 3/8 in) metre gauge
- Electrification: 100%, 1500 V DC, Overhead line
- Highest elevation: 1,034 m (3,392 ft)
- Maximum incline: 120 ‰ or 12 %

The Bernese Oberland Railway (German: Berner Oberland-Bahn, BOB) is a narrow-gauge mountain railway in the Bernese Oberland region of Switzerland. It runs, via a "Y" junction at Zweilütschinen to serve Lauterbrunnen and Grindelwald from Interlaken. The railway is rack assisted (that is although an adhesion railway, rack and pinion operation is used on steep sections of the line to assist traction).

The BOB is owned by the Berner Oberland-Bahnen AG, a company that also owns the 800 mm (2 ft 7 1/2 in) Schynige Platte Railway. Through that company it is part of the Allianz – Jungfrau Top of Europe marketing alliance, which also includes the separately owned Wengernalpbahn, Jungfraubahn, Bergbahn Lauterbrunnen–Mürren, Harderbahn, and Firstbahn.

== History ==
=== Planning ===
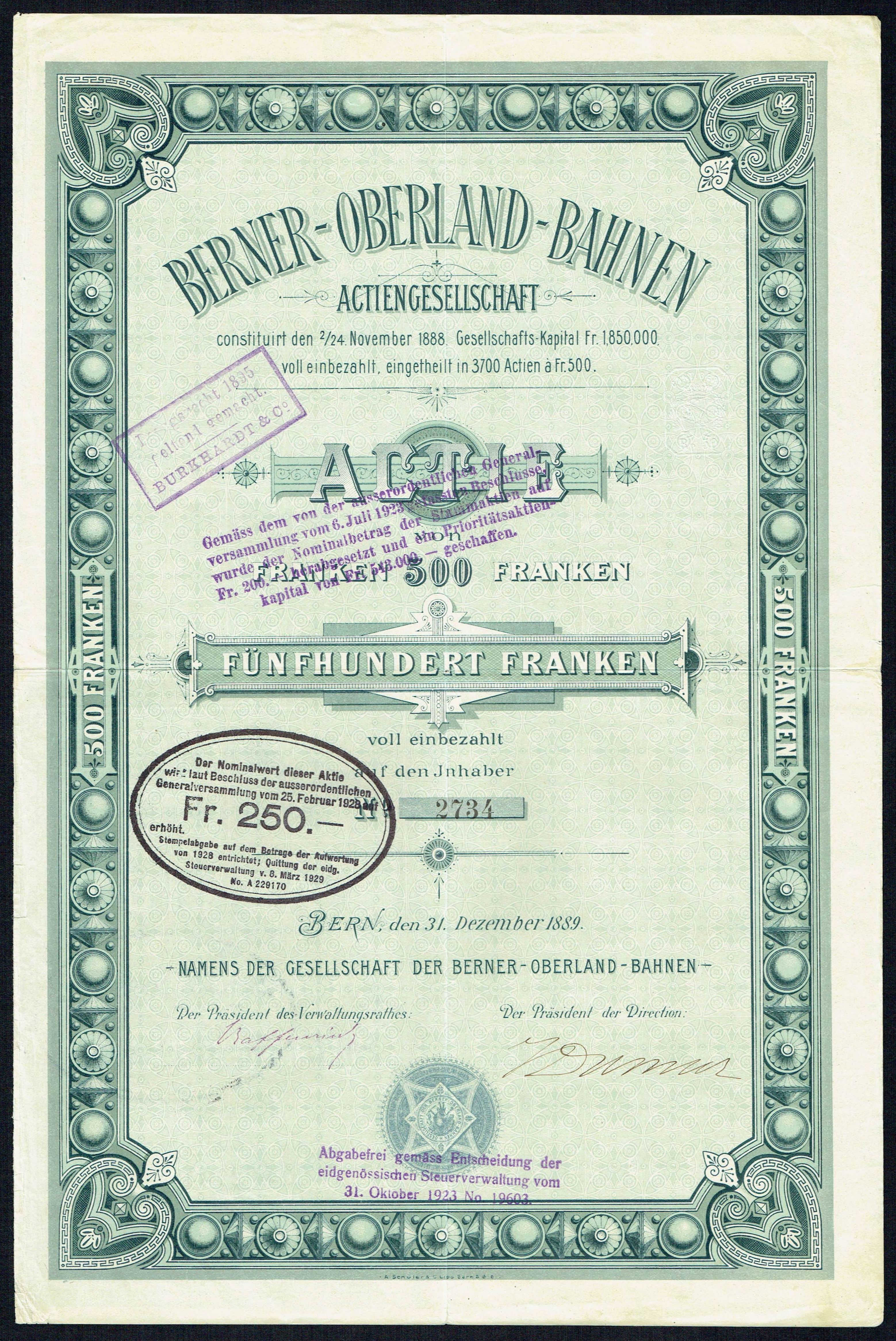
Share of the Berner-Oberland-Bahnen AG, issued 31. December 1889

The first proposals for the Berner Oberland-Bahn, made in 1873, showed a line from Interlaken (at that time Aarmühle) to Zweilütschinen with later options to Lauterbrunnen and Grindelwald with starting point at Bönigen. Four years later an 80 years concession was obtained for construction and operation of the line and the company, Berner Oberland-Bahnen AG was founded on 2 November 1888.

Negotiations with landowners proceeded quickly and by March 1889 the foundations for the bridge over the River Lütschine at Gsteig were already under construction.

=== Failure of the plan to extend to Visp ===
In 1897 the company obtained a concession to construct a 54.7 km line from Lauterbrunnen to Visp, with stations at Stechelberg, Steinberg, Oberborn, and Blatten. It would have involved the construction of a 4,650 m tunnel at 2,200 m elevation under the Breithorn mountain. At Visp it would have had a connection with the Simplon line.

Estimated at 15 million Swiss francs, finance was not forthcoming and by 1906 the plans were abandoned.

=== Initial operations ===
By 1 July 1890 the 1,000 mm (3 ft 3 3/8 in) gauge line, was opened, using steam traction.

On 18 August 1902 a disastrous fire destroyed the station buildings and goods shed at Grindelwald and these were later rebuilt, surviving to the present day. On 7 October 1908 a new station was added to the system, that at Schwendi on the Grindelwald section.

Steam traction on the line came to an end in 1914, the line becoming electrified at 1500 V d.c., overhead supply, on 17 March of that year, although steam locomotives have been used since that date on special services.

Several changes were made during the 1950s and 1960s, the two most important being in 1957, the construction of an airfield at Interlaken causing the realignment of the line between Wilderswil and Interlaken Ost, but to no detriment and, with a need for servicing and construction facilities on the line a new depot was opened at Zweilütschinen in 1968.

=== Recent improvements ===
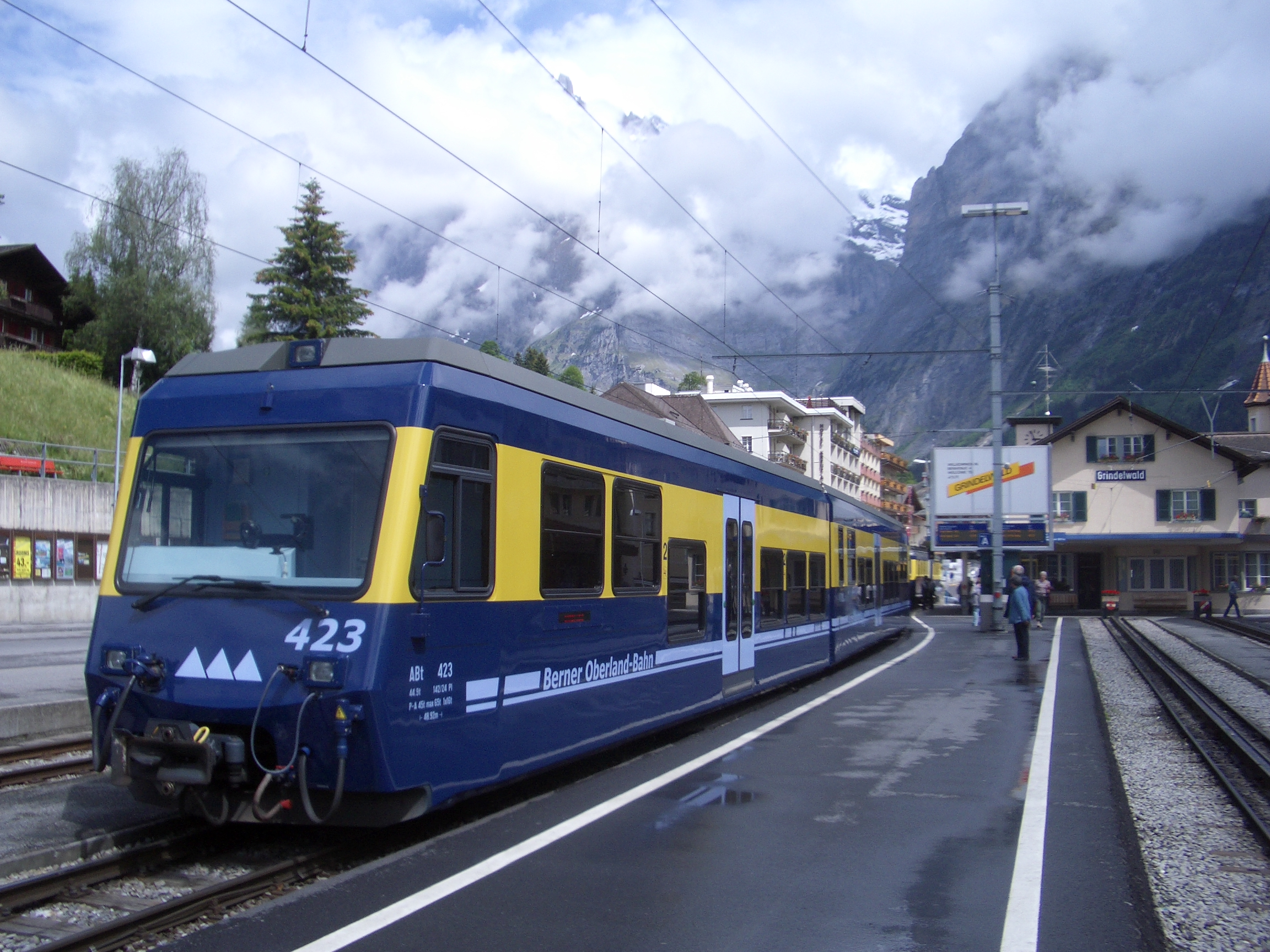
A modern low-floor train of the BOB in Grindelwald with the track of the Wengernalpbahn on the adjacent platform. Note the modern blue / yellow BOB livery.

In 1989 over 22 million CHF was approved as investment to replace the overhead line between Interlaken and Wilderswil, and Zweilütschinen and Lauterbrunnen. The plans included straightening the Wilderswil to Zweilütschinen section, and track renewal from Zweilütschinen to Grindelwald. A new pedestrian underpass at Interlaken-Ost station was also included in the plans. The straightening of the line by 1991 allowed trains to reach speeds of 65 kilometres per hour (40 mph) in the Fliesau area near Wilderswil

In 1993 a long term reconstruction project at Lauterbrunnen railway station which had taken over 12 years and cost CHF 7.0m was completed with the installation of the glass platform roof and direct connection ramps from the multi-storey car park.

The BOB has a total length of 23.608 km and is a mixed rack and adhesion railway with four rack and pinion sections, using the Riggenbach rack system, two each on the steep sections of both arms of the line.

=== Fatal accident in 2003 ===
On 7 August 2003 two trains collided head-on on a single track section between Zweilütschinen and Wilderswil, 1 person was killed and 64 injured. The regular train coming down from Zweilütschinen had passed a red signal at the end of the double track section and collided with an extra train near Gsteigwiler. Automatic train stop system ZSI-127 had already been in place but not yet in use, awaiting final completion and approval.

== Operations ==
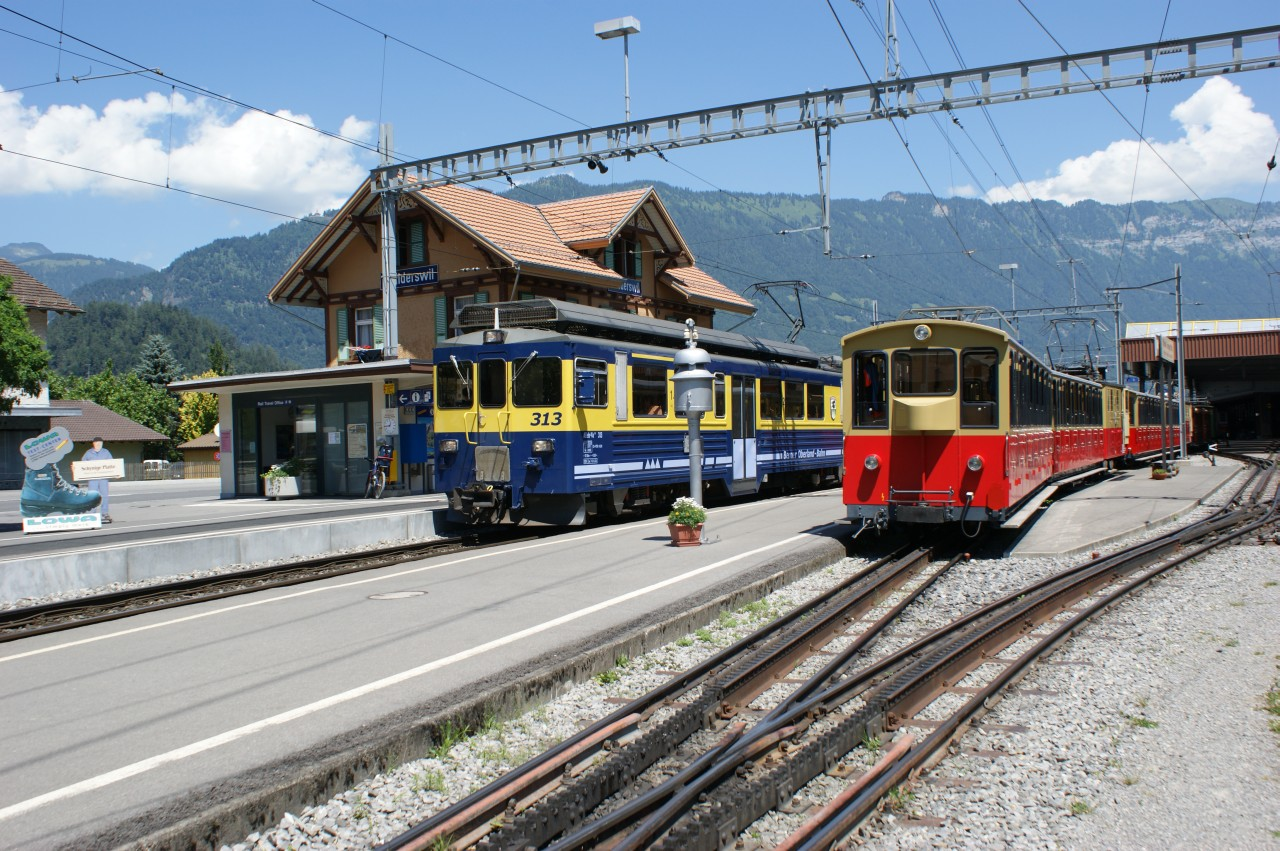
A train at the Wilderswil station with the track of the Schynige Platte Railway (red train) on the adjacent platform

Since 1949, railcars have predominated. Some of the older electric locomotives still survive and are used for special trains. The centre of operations is Zweilütschinen with the depot headquarters and the modern main workshops.

From the introduction of the 1999 timetable, the newly constructed 2.5 km section of dual track between Gsteigwiler and Zweilütschinen allows trains to pass without one having to wait in a loop, off the main line. This means that a half-hour timetable can be operated with only five train compositions. Since 2005, every composition has been equipped with an articulated (three-part) low-floor driving trailer as standard.

Two train compositions are usually coupled together to travel to Zweilütschinen where they are then split. The front portion travels to Lauterbrunnen, the other one to Grindelwald. The motor coach (power unit) is always positioned on the uphill side, a driving trailer (coach with a driver's cab) being positioned on the downhill side, to avoid any running round manoeuvres at the terminus stations.

=== Stations ===
Station	Distance (km)	Height (m)	Information
Interlaken Ost	−0.18	567	connections to the Zentralbahn, BLS and Swiss Federal Railways
Matten bei Interlaken	2.1	577	opened December 2023
Wilderswil	3.24	584	connections to the Schynige Platte Railway
Zweilütschinen	8.18	652	trains divide with front portion for Lauterbrunnen and the rear portion for Grindelwald
Lauterbrunnen	12.28	795	connections to the Wengernalpbahn for Kleine Scheidegg via Wengen and the Bergbahn Lauterbrunnen-Mürren to Mürren
Lutschental	12.29	714	Request stop
Burglauenen	14.43	896	Request stop
Schwendi	16.82	920	Request stop
Grindelwald Terminal	18.34	1001	opened 15 December 2019 to serve the Männlichen cableway and later the new cableway to the Eigergletscher station on the Jungfrau Railway.
Grindelwald	19.41	1034	connections to the Wengernalpbahn for Kleine Scheidegg

== Timetable ==
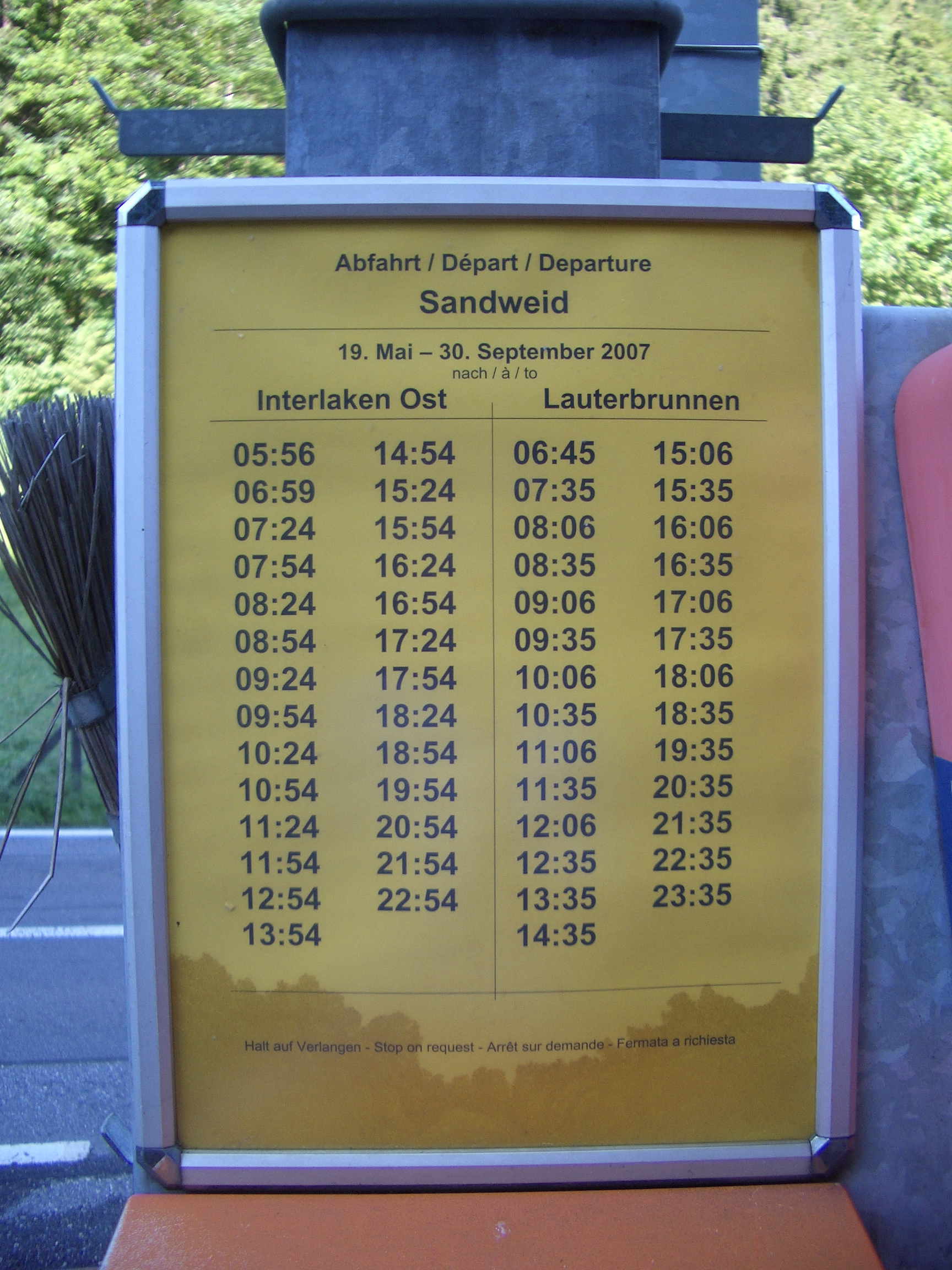
A departure board showing clock-face scheduling on the line

Like all Swiss railways the BOB operates to a clock – face timetable offering connections from the main line at Interlaken and, at its upper terminals, to the Wengernalpbahn.

Throughout the year the BOB offers a service every hour in each direction on both its lines, the trains leaving Interlaken Ost coupled together and dividing at Zweilütschinen. From mid December to late October, additional trains give a 30-minute service frequency in the morning and afternoon. The last services are often timetabled to be operated by buses.

== Locomotives / Railcars ==
No.	Name	Class	Seats: 1st/2nd	Builders Details	Date Built	Notes.
1		Tm		Stadler/Sr/BBC/ MFO/SIG	1946	Rebuilt 1980; 6-cyl/110 kW
21		Xm1/2		P&T	1979	6-cyl diesel/123 kW
24		HGe3/3		SLM/MFO/BBC	1914	Rebuilt 1940
29		HGe3/3		SLM/MFO	1926	2013 transfer to the Blonay–Chamby museum railway (BC)
31		HGm2/2		Steck/Deutz/SLM	1985	6-cyl diesel/296 kW
301		ABDeh4/4	10/32	SLM/BBC	1949	Leased to MIB, 1995 scrapped
302		ABDeh4/4	10/32	SLM/BBC	1949	Engineers Dept.
303		ABDeh4/4	10/32	SLM/BBC	1949	Engineers Dept.
304		ABeh4/4	12/32	SIG/SLM/BBC	1965	Brown/Cream livery at 9.2007.
305	Gündlischwand	ABeh4/4	12/32	SIG/SLM/BBC	1965	Rebuilt 1998
306	Lütschental	ABeh4/4	12/32	SIG/SLM/BBC	1965	Rebuilt 1997
307	Wilderswil	ABeh4/4	12/32	SIG/SLM/BBC	1965	Rebuilt 2002
308	Gsteigwiler	ABeh4/4	12/32	SIG/SLM/BBC	1979	
309		ABeh4/4	12/32	SIG/SLM/BBC	1979	1999 sold to BZB
310	Matten	ABeh4/4	12/32	SIG/SLM/BBC	1979	Rebuilt 2007
311	Grindelwald	ABeh4/4	12/24	SLM 5296/BBC	1986	
312	Interlaken	ABeh4/4	12/24	SLM 5297/BBC	1986	
313	Lauterbrunnen	ABeh4/4	12/24	SLM 5298/BBC	1986	
(321)		BDe4/4	0/34	SIG/SAAS	1953	2003 ex-CJ No.601*), 2006 sold to LEB No.28**)
(322)		BDe4/4	0/34	SIG/SAAS	1953	2003 ex-CJ No.604*), 2005 sold to MIB No.10
321		ABDeh 8/8	12/96	Stadler Bussnang	2017	
322		ABDeh 8/8	12/96	Stadler Bussnang	2017	
323		ABDeh 8/8	12/96	Stadler Bussnang	2017	
324		ABDeh 8/8	12/96	Stadler Bussnang	2017	
325		ABDeh 8/8	12/96	Stadler Bussnang	2017	
326		ABDeh 8/8	12/96	Stadler Bussnang	2017	

- Rebuild 1997–2008 of 304–310 included fitting of equipment for push–pull trains, available from delivery on 311–313
- *) for use on the then-planned but finally not built branch line to Mystery Park
- **) arrived on LEB still numbered 601 on 22 February 2006 and was used together with Bt 702 arriving directly from CJ. LEB finally purchased the two vehicles.

== Rolling stock ==
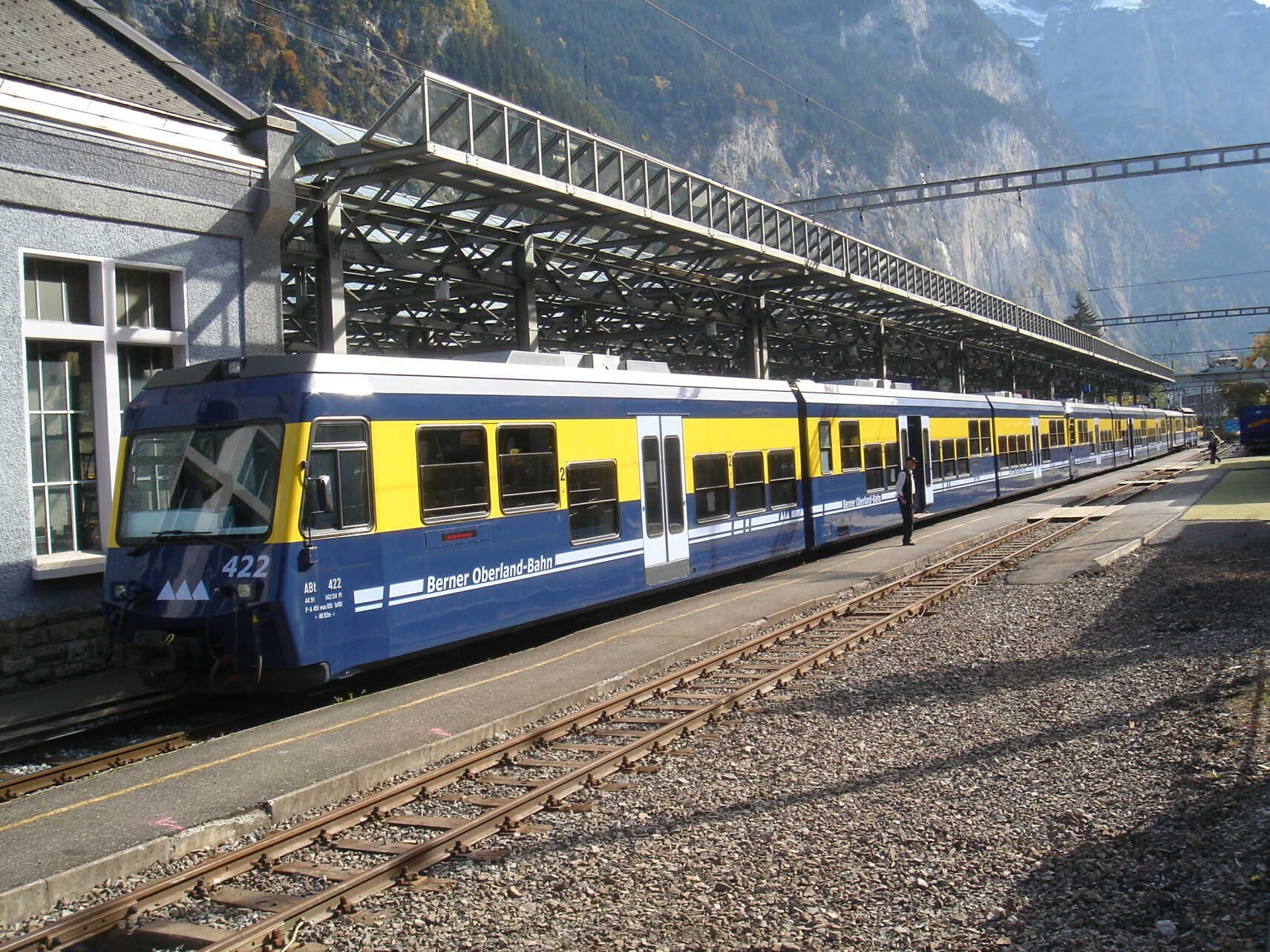
A train in Lauterbrunnen with Stadler ABt, low floor 3-car set nearest the camera.

The passenger rolling stock of the line can be divided into that in regular use and that which is historic in nature. Present day passenger stock is painted in striking a blue/yellow livery.

That in regular use can be divided as follows:

- Series A, First class open saloon bogie coaches with 36 seats, numbered 181 and 182, built by SIG in 1971, with 182 being rebuilt in 1999, MU-wired, and 181 sold to SBB, now Zentralbahn A 217.
- Series AB, First/Second Composite bogie saloon open platform coaches with 18 first and 48 second class seats, originally numbered 205–210, built by SIG and delivered, the first two in 1952, the second pair in 1954 and the final pair in 1956. No.209 is the only member to be found on the line and still carrying (October 2009) the Brown and Cream BOB livery. It is not regularly working and can usually be found in Interlaken. (See Preservation Notes (Below).
- Series AB, First/Second Composite bogie saloon coaches with 24 first and 23 second class seats, numbered 211–215, built by SIG and delivered in 1970. All have since been fitted with MU wiring, 211, 213 and 214 sold to Zentralbahn.
- Series AB, First/Second Composite bogie coach with 23 first and 22 second class seats, numbered 221, built by SIG in 1946 and purchased from SBB (Brünig) in 1997, scrapped 2006.
- Series B, Second class open saloon bogie coaches with 72 seats, numbered 232–237, built by SIG between 1952 and 1956. Five members of this group are preserved,(See notes below). Number 232 is still on the line and shown in stock lists but is presently (2009) to be found in Interlaken in Brown/Cream livery.
- Series B, Second class saloon open platform bogie coaches with 64 seats, numbered 241–256, built by SIG between 1967 and 1970, most have been rebuilt but five members have been scrapped. 253–256 originally Zentralbahn. Repainted and MU-wired: 241, 245, 247, 250–256. 242 was MU-wired but is still in Brown/Cream livery and permanently sitting in Interlaken.
- Series B, Second class open saloon bogie coaches with 62 seats, numbered 261 and 262, built by ACMV/SIG and delivered in 1987. MU-wired.
- Series B, Second class open saloon, bogie coach with 52 seats, numbered 271, built by SIG for the SBB in 1954 as AB477 and rebuilt in 2001, scrapped 2006.
- Series B, Second class open saloon bogie coaches with 60 seats, numbered 271–274, built by SIG for the SBB as B861/B863/B846 and delivered in 1954, being purchased and repainted in 1998, scrapped 1999/2006/2003/2006.
- Series BD, Second class open saloon bogie coaches (40 seats) with guards/parcels compartment, numbered 501–503. These were built by SIG and delivered to the SBB, adapted for push-pull trains as numbers 512-4 / 511-6 / 510-8 in 1968/9. They were rebuilt 2003/4.
- Series BDt, Second class driving trailer (40 seats) with guards/parcel compartment, numbered 401–403, built by ACMV/SIG/BBC in 1987.
- Series ABt, First/Second composite driving trailer with 18 first and 31 second class seats, numbered 411 to 415 inclusive, built for the RBS as ABt 207/3/6/4/5 by FFA/SWP in 1982, being rebuilt by the BOB in 2003–06.
- Series ABt, First/Second composite driving trailer three-car sets with low floor access built by Stadler. These were delivered in 2005 and now form part of every train. They are numbered from 421 to 425 inclusive.
- Series D, Guards/Luggage bogie coach built by SIG in 1971 numbered 531 to 535 inclusive. 532 sold to CJ, 535 scrapped, 532 MU wired, still brown/cream

Historical stock includes the following items, which still carry the former brown/cream livery for coaches and all-over brown for guards/parcels vehicles.

- Series A3, First Class saloon, double verandah with 30 seats, No.102. repairs required to one end due to accident.
- Series BC4, First/second class open saloon coach with 14 first and 38 second class seats, numbered 203, built by SIG in 1938 and rebuilt in 1988.
- Series C3, Second class open saloon coach numbered 29.
- Series D3, Guards/parcels carriage, numbered 515 and 516, built by SIG in 1911.

Goods stock is a varied collection, much of which would not be out of place in a museum. The earliest wagon shown on the BOB stock list dates from 1888 and was rebuilt by the BOB in 1990. The collection of goods stock totals over 30 assorted wagons, most pre-First World War, many built by SIG and much rebuilt by the BOB over the years. More recently a few additions have been made, most of which are second-hand from CFF/SBB/FFS. The line is home to a snowplough (Series Xrot e) with was built in 1954 by SIG/BBC and rebuilt in 1990 at the BOB workshops.

== Preservation ==
Several items of rolling stock have been sold (transferred) to metre gauge preserved railways.

- Series B, Second class open saloon bogie coaches with 52 seats, numbered 201 and 202, built by SIG in 1930 are preserved by the La Traction group. Both were rebuilt, 201 in 1965, 202 in 1972 and both again in 1997.
- Series AB, First/Second Composite saloon bogie coach No. 204, with 24 first and 23 second class seats, built by SIG in 1938 and rebuilt in 1997 can also be found at the depot of La Traction.
- Series AB, First/Second Composite saloon bogiecoaches with 18 first and 48 second class seats, numbered 205–210, built by SIG and delivered, the first two in 1952, the second pair in 1954 and the final pair in 1956. All, except 206 and 208 have been rebuilt. No. 205 is preserved and works on the Brohltalbahn whilst 207, 208 and 210 can be found on the Chemin de Fer de la Baie de Somme (CFBS).
- Series B has five preserved members, No's 234 and 235 are to be found on the Brohltalbahn with 205, whilst 231, 236 and 237 are in northern France working on the CFBS.
- Series D, Guards / parcels carriages, No. 521, built by SIG in 1916 and rebuilt by BOB in 1973/4 can be found working on the Brohltalbahn, whilst No. 522, again built by SIG in 1916 and rebuilt by BOB in 1973/4 together with No. 523, built in 1908 by SIG and rebuilt by BOB in 1976 are to be found on the CFBS. Vehicle No. 522 is undergoing, (at Spring 2007), a rebuilt into a catering car for use on the CFBS dining car train.

== See also ==
- List of narrow-gauge railways in Switzerland

== Sources ==
Items shown in the above list are taken from official BOB listings, last issue September 2004, and have been updated by personal observations made during September 2007 (plus visit to Grindelwald in December 2019).
