= Gsteig (disambiguation) =

Gsteig may refer to:

- Gsteig, Germany in Ostallgäu, Bavaria
- Gsteig bei Gstaad, a municipality in the district Saanen, Canton of Berne, Switzerland
- The church Gsteig bei Interlaken (municipality of Gsteigwiler, Switzerland)

.
