= Lütschine =

River in the Bernese Oberland region of Switzerland

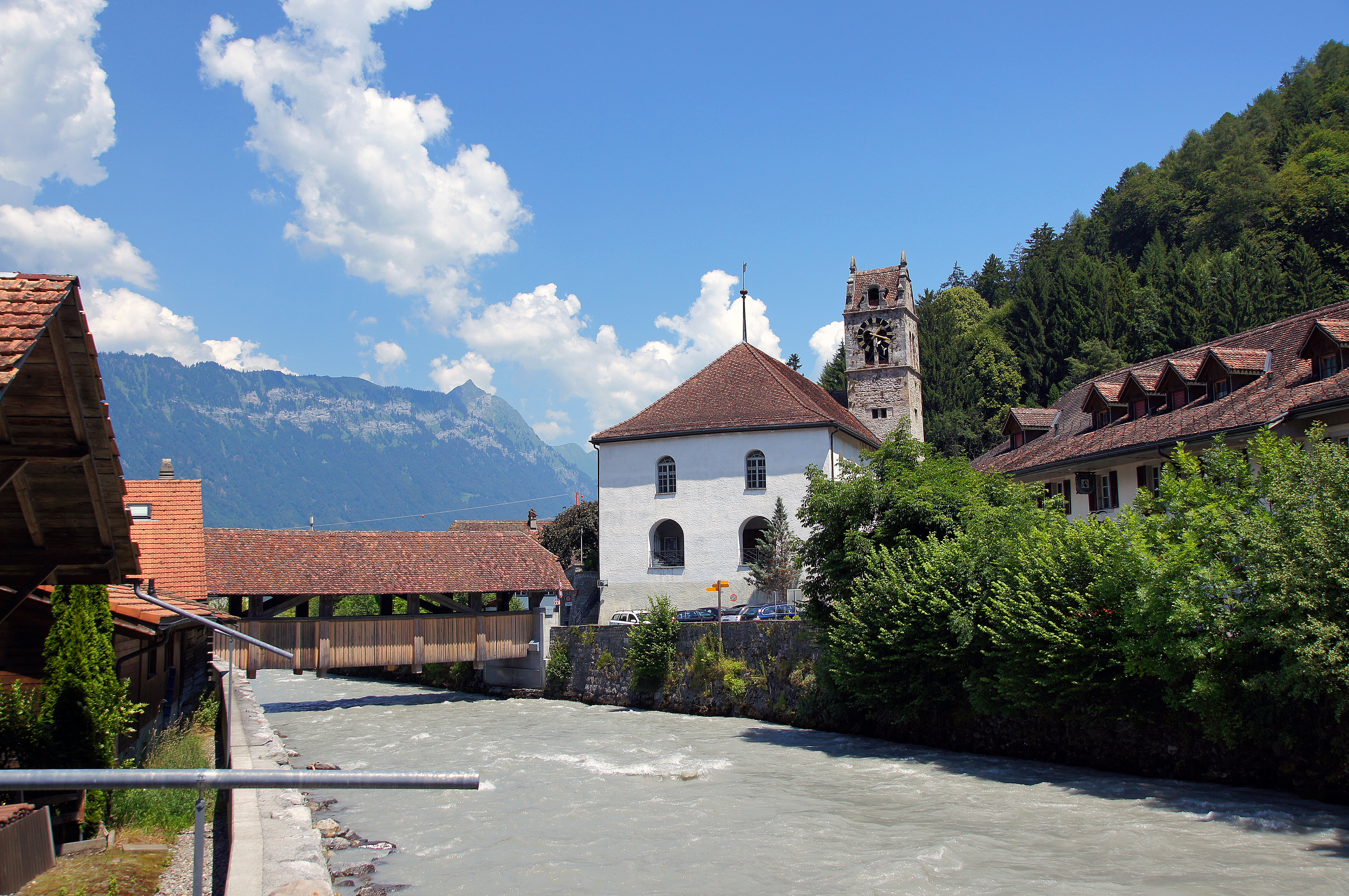
- Lütschine in Wilderswil

Location
- Country: Switzerland

Physical characteristics
- Mouth: Lake Brienz
  - coordinates: 46.6911°N 7.8984°E

Basin features
- Progression: Lake Brienz→ Aare→ Rhine→ North Sea

The Lütschine (German pronunciation: [ˈlʏtʃinə]) is a river in the Bernese Oberland region of Switzerland. The Lütschine proper runs from Zweilütschinen, where its two tribututaries join, to Lake Brienz at Bönigen. The Schwarze Lütschine, or Black Lütschine, flows from Grindelwald to Zweilütschinen. The Weisse Lütschine, or White Lütschine, flows from the Lauterbrunnen Valley to Zweilütschinen. The common stretch of the river has a length of 8.6 kilometres (5.3 mi), whilst the Schwarze Lütschine is 12.3 kilometres (7.6 mi) long and the Weisse Lütschine is 13.1 kilometres (8.1 mi) long.

Both branches of the Lütschine include a large number of mountain streams as tributaries. A notable tributary of the Schwarze Lütschine, emerging from the gorge of the Lower Grindelwald Glacier, is confusingly referred to as "Weisse Lütschine". The highest point of the drainage basin is the Jungfrau.

A story passed on by word of mouth showing friendly banter between villagers that lived on the two rivers is that the people on the Weisse Lütschine said the others "were so dirty it turned the river black" and the villagers on the Schwarze Lütschine claimed the others "never even washed so the other tributary remained perfectly white".

A modern observer standing at Zweilütschinen in winter might note that during the day the Schwarze Lütschine valley to the east is dark, shaded and cold, whereas the south facing Weisse Lütschine valley to the south (the Lauterbrunnen Valley) is sunny and light.

From Wilderswil to Lauterbrunnen and Grindelwald, the banks of the Lütschine are closely followed by the tracks of the Berner Oberland Railway.

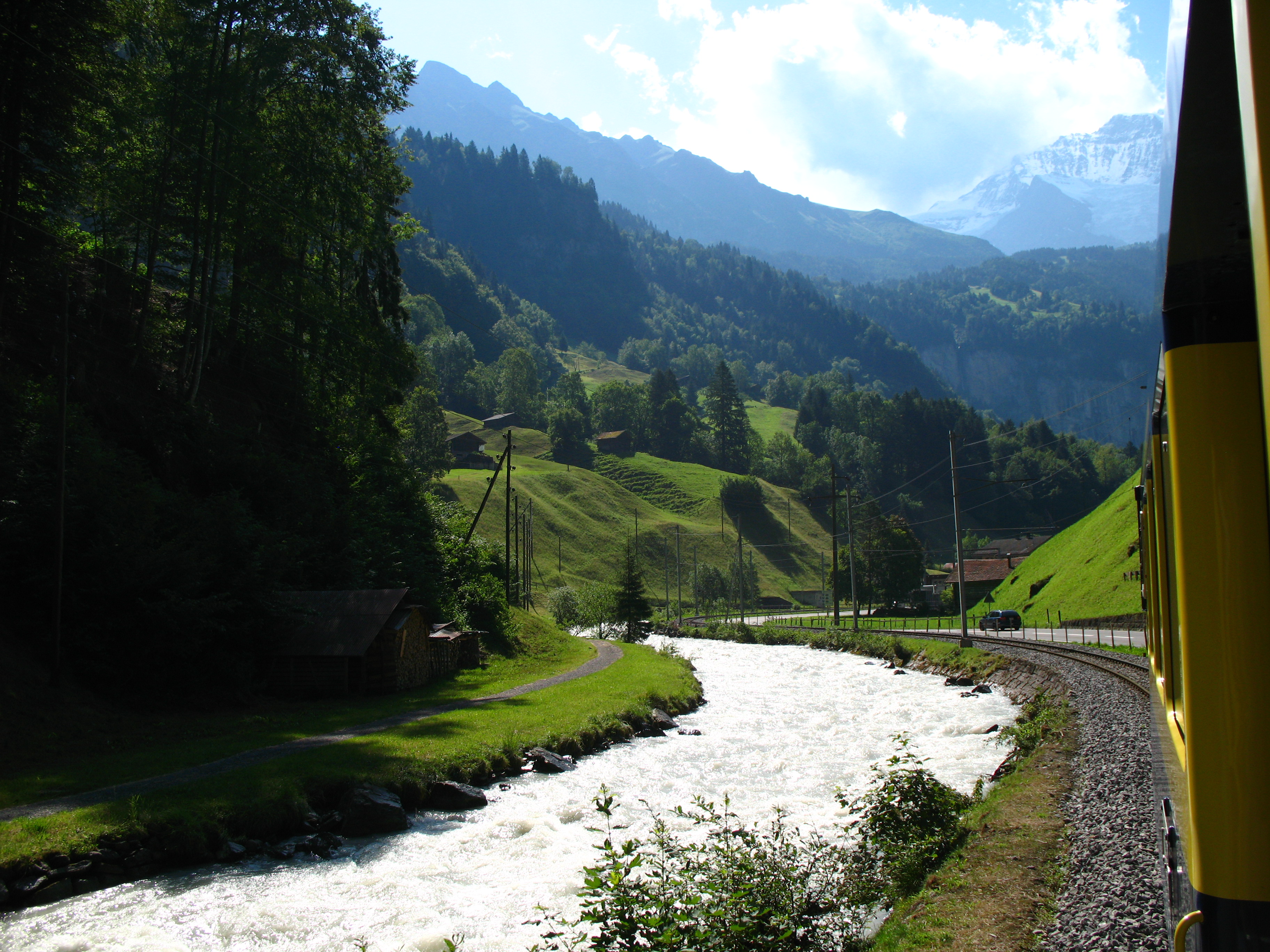
The Weisse Lütschine at Schmitsmatta

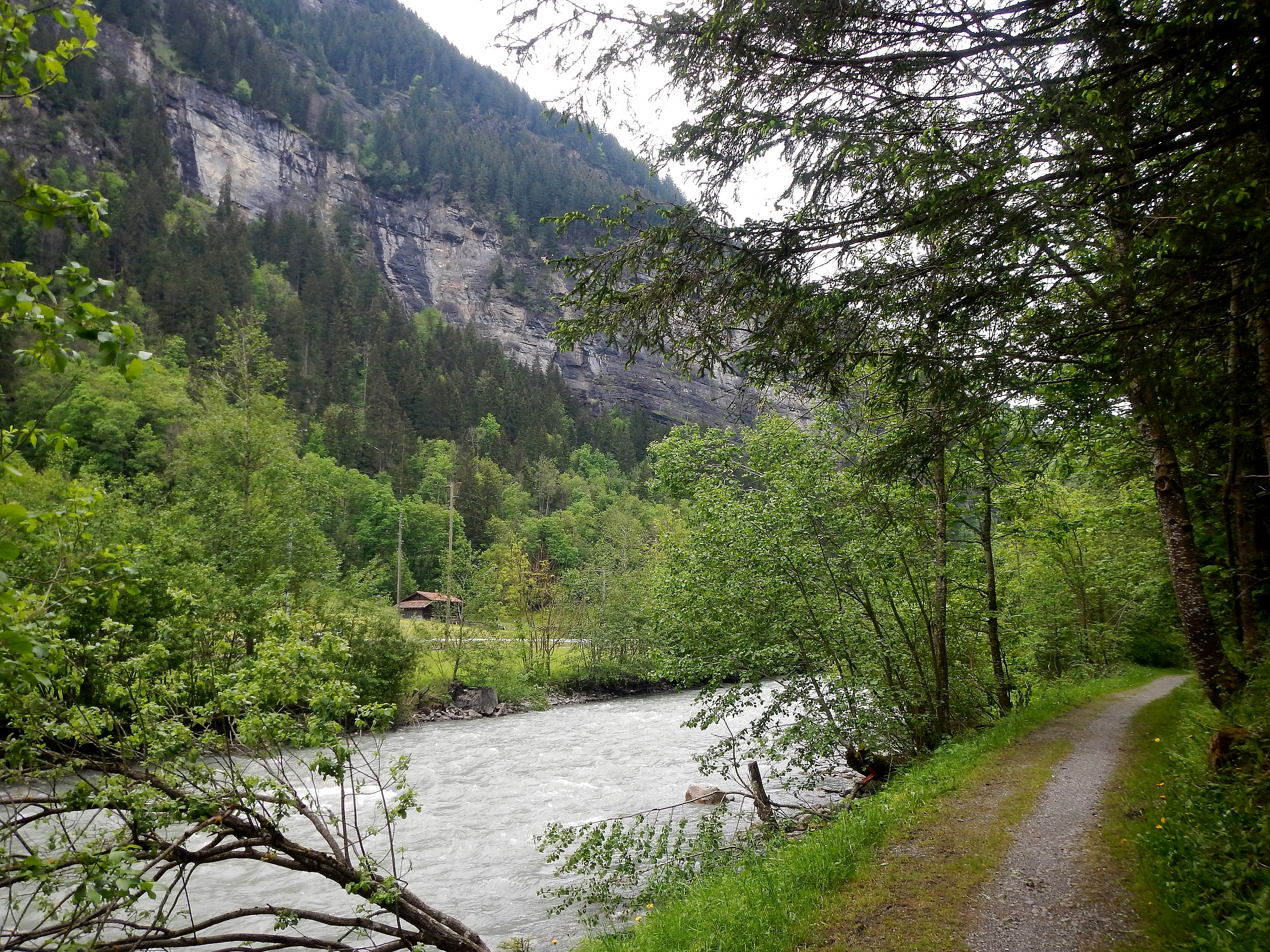
The Schwarze Lütschine at Burglauenen

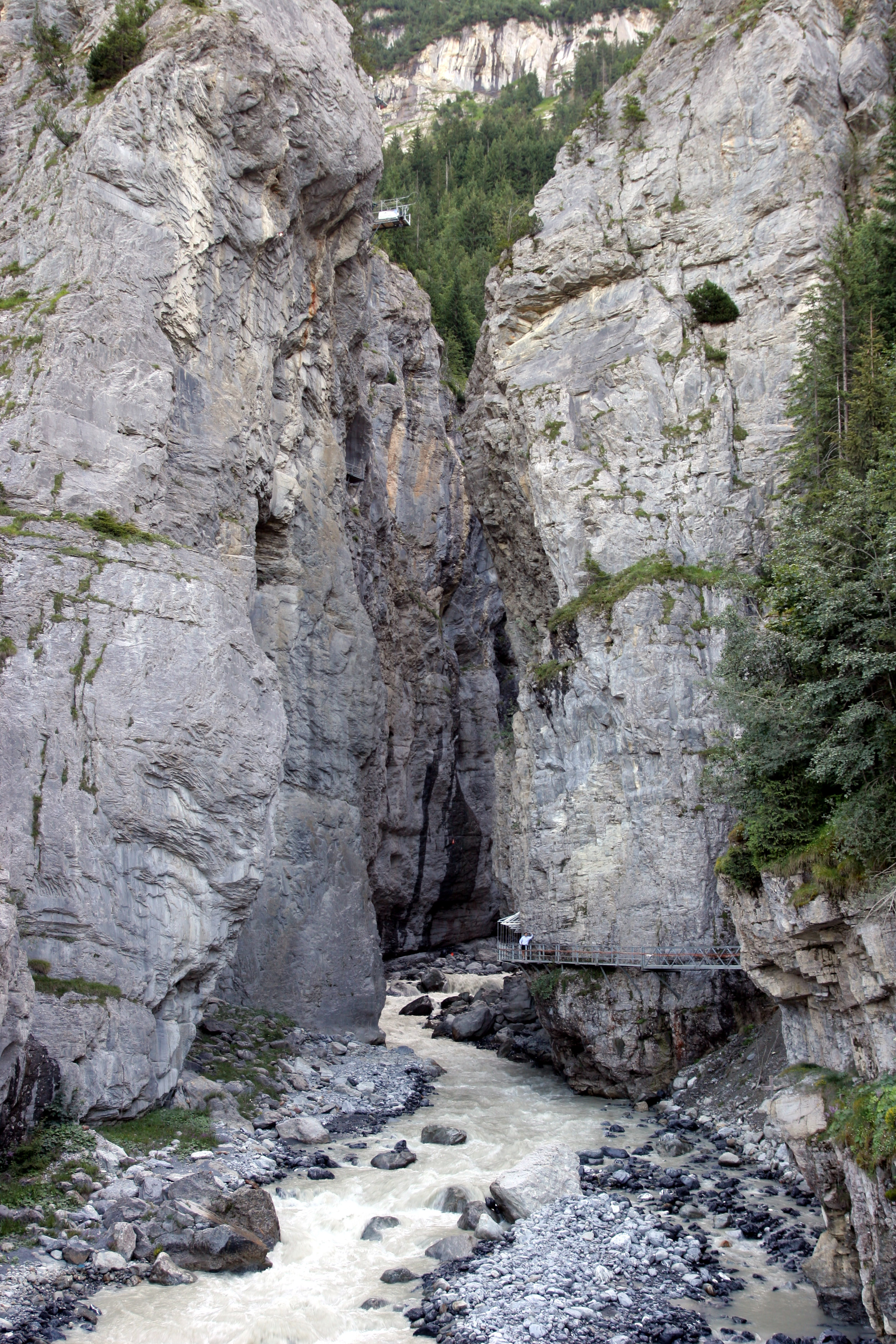
The minor "Weisse Lütschine" of the Schwarze Lütschine in the Grindelwald glacier gorge

== See also ==
- List of rivers of Switzerland
