= Interlaken Ost railway station =

Railway station in Interlaken, Switzerland

Interlaken Ost
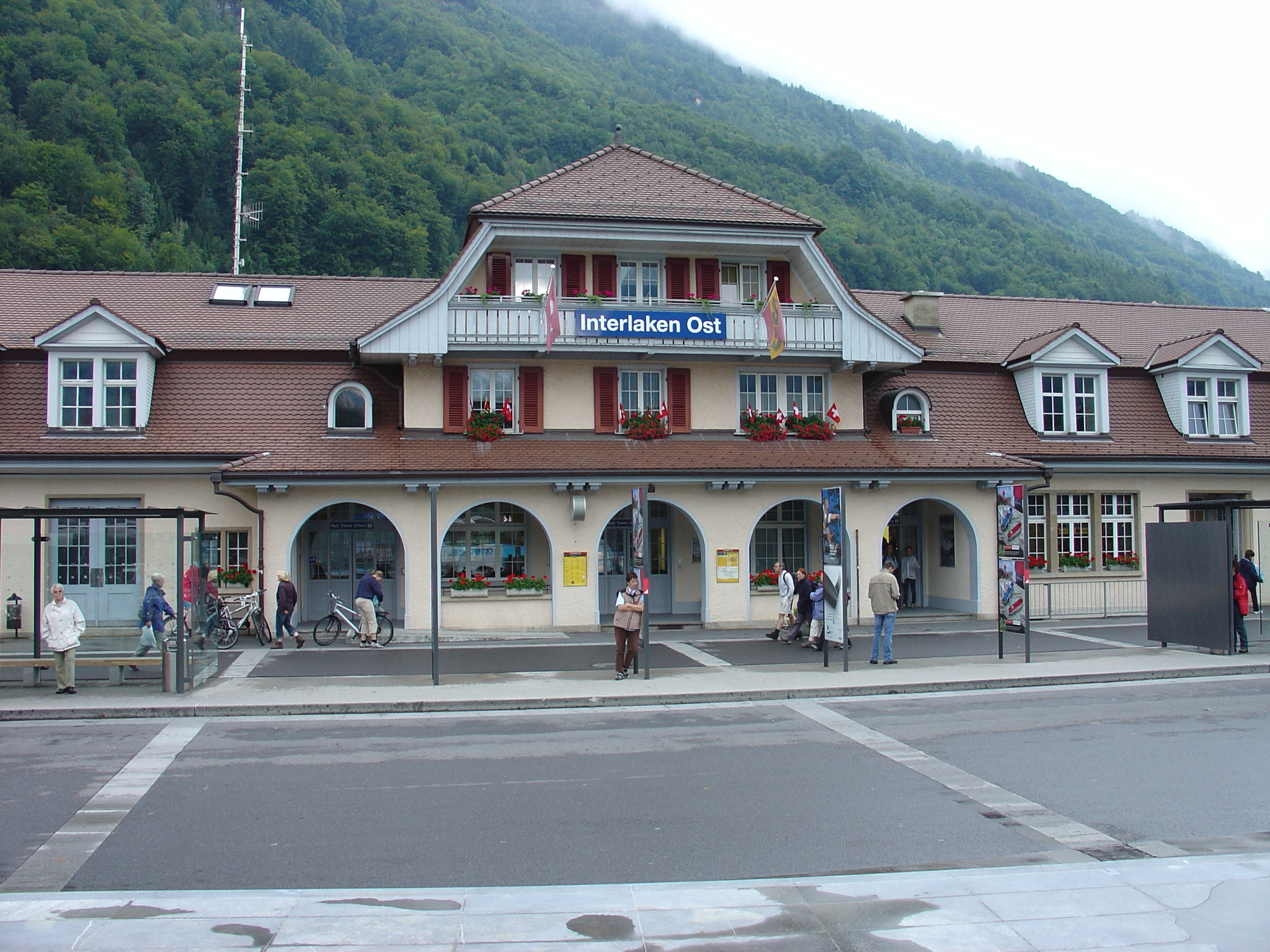
- The station building in 2007

General information
- Location: Untere Bönigstrasse; Interlaken, Bern; Switzerland
- Coordinates: 46°41′24″N 7°52′08″E
- Elevation: 567 m (1,860 ft)
- Owner: Bernese Oberland Railway; Bödelibahn (1874-?)
- Lines: Bernese Oberland line; Brünig line; Thunersee line; Bödelibahn line (originally)
- Distance: 28.0 km (17.4 mi) from Thun; 74.0 km (46.0 mi) from Lucerne
- Platforms: 8 (3 island platforms)
- Tracks: 9
- Train operators: Berner Oberland-Bahnen; BLS AG; Deutsche Bahn; Swiss Federal Railways; Zentralbahn
- Connections: BLS AG ferries on Lake Brienz; PostAuto Schweiz and Verkehrsbetriebe STI bus lines

Construction
- Parking: Yes (200 spaces)
- Accessible: Yes

Other information
- Station code: 8507492 (IO)
- IATA code: ZIN
- Fare zone: 750 (Libero)

History
- Opened: 1874
- Former names: Interlaken Zollhaus

Passengers
- 2025: 17,700 per day (BLS, SBB, Zentralbahn (excluding BOB))
- Rank: 45 out of 1,095 (Note: Tied with Thalwil railway station.)

Services
Preceding station	Berner Oberland-Bahnen AG	Following station
Terminus	Bernese Oberland Railway	Matten bei Interlaken towards Lauterbrunnen or Grindelwald
Preceding station	DB Fernverkehr	Following station
Interlaken West towards Berlin Ostbahnhof	ICE 12	Terminus
Preceding station	Zentralbahn	Following station
Terminus	Panorama Express Luzern-Interlaken Express	Brienz towards Lucerne
Terminus	Panorama Express Luzern-Interlaken Express	Oberried am Brienzersee towards Lucerne
Terminus	Regio	Ringgenberg towards Meiringen
Preceding station	BLS	Following station
Interlaken West towards Spiez	RE9	Terminus
Interlaken West towards Montreux	GoldenPass Express	Terminus
Preceding station	SBB CFF FFS	Following station
Interlaken West towards Basel SBB	IC 61	Terminus
Interlaken West towards Romanshorn	IC 81	Terminus
Location
- Location within Switzerland Location within Canton of Bern

Interlaken Ost or Interlaken East is a railway station in the resort town of Interlaken in the Swiss canton of Bern. The station was previously known as Interlaken Zollhaus. The town has one other station, Interlaken West.

Interlaken Ost is an important railway junction at the meeting point of three railway lines, the Thunersee line of the BLS AG, the Brünig line of the Zentralbahn, and the Bernese Oberland railway (BOB). In addition to trains operated directly by the owners of these lines, the station is also reached by passenger trains of the Swiss Federal Railways, Deutsche Bahn, all of which operate over the Thunersee line.

The station provides an interchange with the local bus network provided by PostBus Switzerland and the regional bus line to Thun provided by Verkehrsbetriebe STI. Ships of the BLS-owned fleet on Lake Brienz serve a quay at Interlaken Ost, which they access via a navigable reach of the Aar river.

== History ==
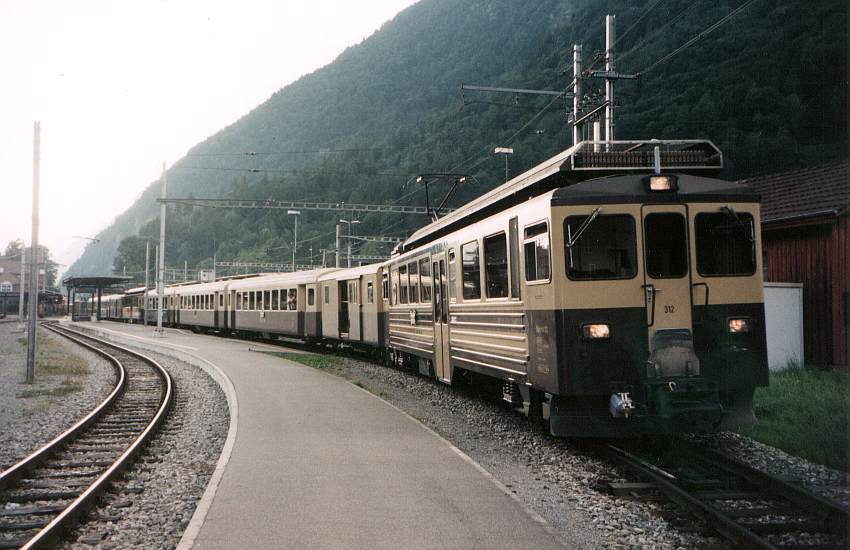
A BOB train at Interlaken Ost, note the former brown / cream livery

In 1872, the standard gauge Bödelibahn railway opened from Därligen, on Lake Thun, to Interlaken, as Interlaken West station was then known. Two years later it was extended to Bönigen, on Lake Brienz, via a new station that was at first known as Interlaken Zollhaus. Initially this line was unconnected to the rest of the Swiss railway system, and merely served as a link between the steamships on both lakes. In 1893, the line reached Thun, with onward connections to Bern and beyond, eventually becoming part of the BLS.

In 1890, the metre gauge Berner Oberland railway opened, adopting Interlaken Zollhaus as the terminus of its route to the tourist destinations of Lauterbrunnen and Grindelwald. As a consequence, Interlaken Zollhaus became more important, and was renamed Interlaken Ost. At the same time the original Interlaken station became Interlaken West.

Meanwhile, in 1888, the metre gauge Brünig railway had opened between Brienz, on Lake Brienz, and Alpnachstad, on Lake Lucerne, thus providing a through steamer and rail connection from Interlaken to Lucerne. By 1916 the Brünig railway had reached Interlaken Ost from Brienz, and, together an earlier extension at its eastern end, provided a through rail route to Lucerne.

Standard gauge passenger service between Interlaken Ost and Bönigen ceased in 1969, although much of the line still exists in order to provide access to the BLS workshops as described above.

== Operation ==
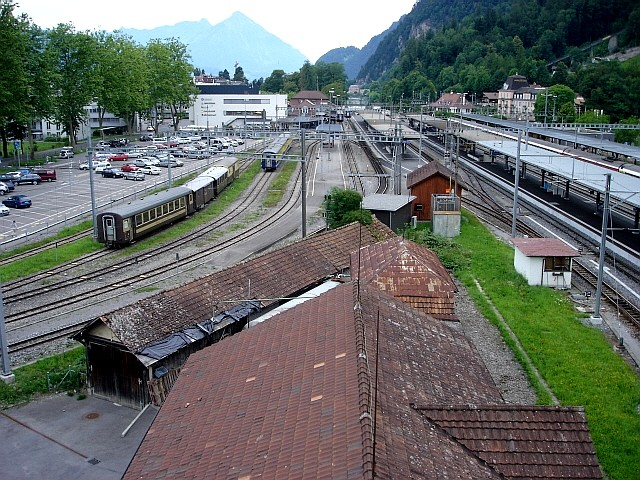
The station seen from the east. The BOB line curves in from the left, serving the leftmost platforms. The Brünig line arrives from the right and serves the central platforms. The Thunersee line arrives from the far end of the station, and serves the rightmost platforms.

=== Layout ===
The station is notable in that although lines converge on it from three directions, it is the terminus of every passenger service which enters it. There are no through services due to incompatibilities in gauge and electrical systems. The Thunersee line is standard gauge while the BOB and Brünig tracks are metre gauge. Additionally, there are two electrical systems; 1500 V DC for the BOB services and 15 kV AC for all the rest.

The platforms used by the Brünig line and BOB are terminal platforms and no metre gauge track exists west of the station. Whilst no standard gauge passenger trains now run to the east of the station, that section of the station is configured for through traffic, and the tracks continue for about 1 kilometre (0.62 mi) to the east in order to provide access to the BLS workshops at Bönigen.

None of the eight platform tracks are dual-gauge or dual-system, from the south side of the station, where the station building is located, the first three platform tracks are used by the BOB, the next two by the Brünig line, and the final three by the Thunersee line.

=== Services ===
As of the December 2025 timetable change, the following services stop at Interlaken Ost:

- InterCity / Intercity Express (ICE): hourly or better service to Basel SBB. Most northbound trains terminate in Basel; a single ICE continues to Hamburg-Altona and two ICE continue to Berlin Ostbahnhof or Dortmund Hauptbahnhof.
- InterCity: service every two hours to Romanshorn.
- GoldenPass Express: 4 daily round-trips to Montreux.
- Panorama Express / Regio: half-hourly service to Meiringen and hourly service to Lucerne.
- InterRegio : two daily round trips to Lucerne between May and October.
- RegioExpress: service every two hours to Spiez.
- Regio: half-hourly service to Lauterbrunnen and Grindelwald; trains operate combined between here and Zweilütschinen.

== See also ==
- Rail transport in Switzerland
