= Grindelwald railway station =

Railway station in the canton of Bern, Switzerland

Grindelwald
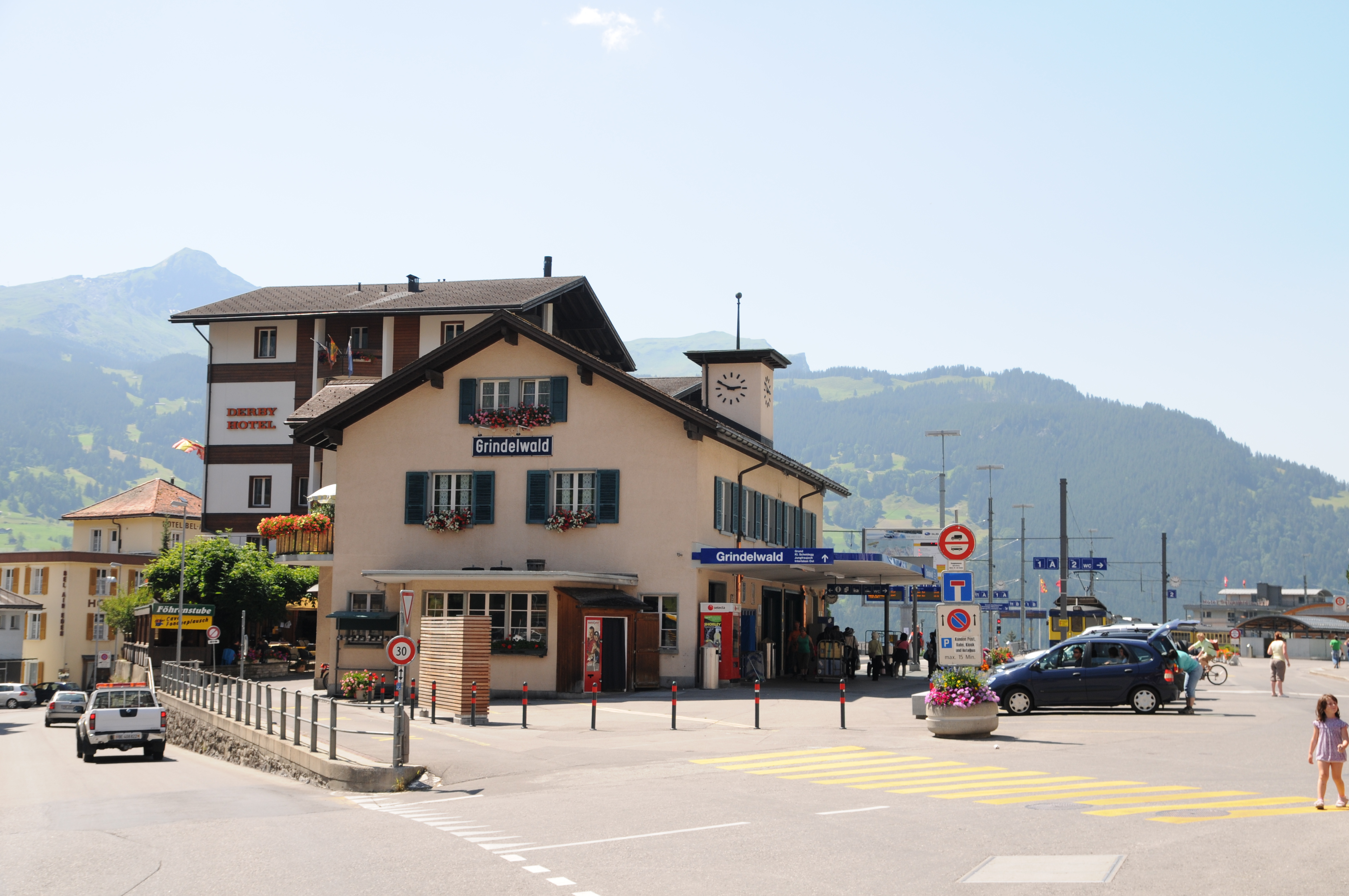
- The station in 2012

General information
- Location: Dorfstrasse; Grindelwald, Bern; Switzerland
- Coordinates: 46°37′28″N 8°02′00″E
- Elevation: 1,034 m (3,392 ft)
- Owner: Berner Oberland-Bahnen
- Lines: Bernese Oberland line; Wengernalp line
- Distance: 19.1 km (11.9 mi) from Lauterbrunnen; 19.4 km (12.1 mi) from Interlaken Ost
- Train operators: Berner Oberland-Bahnen; Wengernalpbahn AG
- Connections: Autoverkehr Grindelwald bus lines

Other information
- Fare zone: 821 (Libero)

History
- Opened: 1 July 1890
- Electrified: 17 March 1914

Services
Preceding station	Jungfraubahn AG	Following station
Terminus	Wengernalp Railway	Grindelwald Grund towards Kleine Scheidegg
Preceding station	Berner Oberland-Bahnen AG	Following station
Grindelwald Terminal towards Interlaken Ost	Bernese Oberland Railway	Terminus
Location

Grindelwald railway station (German: Bahnhof Grindelwald) is a railway station in the village and municipality of Grindelwald in the Swiss canton of Bern. The station is the terminus of both the Berner Oberland Bahn (BOB), whose trains operate services to Interlaken Ost, and of the Wengernalpbahn (WAB), whose trains operate to Kleine Scheidegg via Grindelwald Grund.

The BOB and WAB lines use different gauges, and there is no physical connection between them. However the trains operate from adjacent platforms within the same station. Trains of both lines enter the station from its western end. Counter-intuitively, the WAB commences its ascent to Kleine Scheidegg by descending steeply to Grindelwald Grund, where it reverses and commences its climb.

== Services ==
As of the December 2020 timetable change, the following rail services stop at Grindelwald:

- Regio:
  - half-hourly service to Interlaken Ost.
  - hourly to half-hourly service to Kleine Scheidegg.

Post bus services connect Grindelwald station to other local places, including a service to Meiringen over the Grosse Scheidegg Pass, using a road closed to most other traffic.

== See also ==
- Rail transport in Switzerland
