= Gsteigwiler =

- Municipality
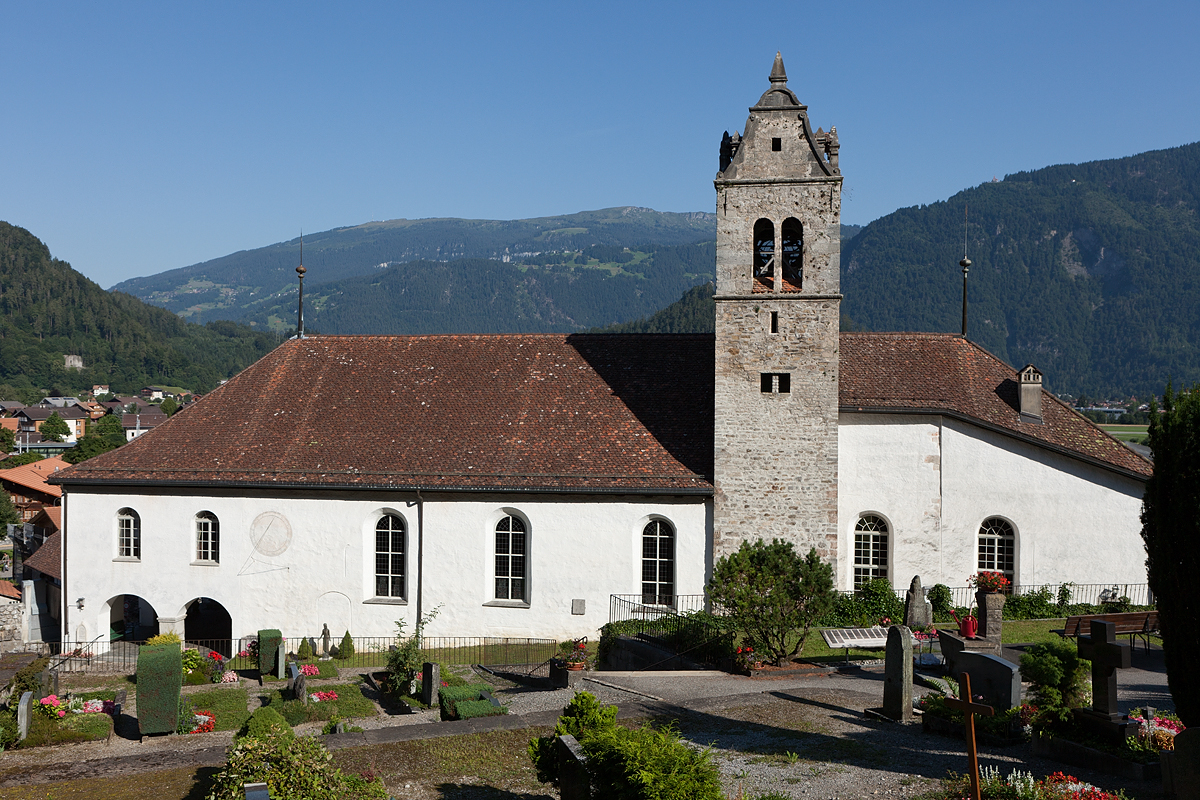
- Gsteig bei Interlaken village church

- Flag Coat of arms
- Location of Gsteigwiler
- Location within Switzerland Location within Canton of Bern
- Coordinates: 46°39′N 7°52′E
- Country: Switzerland
- Canton: Bern
- District: Interlaken-Oberhasli

Government
  - Executive: Gemeinderat with 5 members
  - Mayor: Gemeindepräsident(in); Bernhard Seiler (as of 2026)

Area
  - Total: 7.0 km^{2} (2.7 sq mi)
- Elevation: 645 m (2,116 ft)

Population (December 2020)
  - Total: 402
  - Density: 57/km^{2} (150/sq mi)
- Time zone: UTC+01:00 (CET)
  - Summer (DST): UTC+02:00 (CEST)
- Postal code: 3814
- SFOS number: 577
- ISO 3166 code: CH-BE
- Surrounded by: Matten bei Interlaken, Bönigen, Gündlischwand and Wilderswil
- Website: www.gsteigwiler.ch

Gsteigwiler is a municipality in the Interlaken-Oberhasli administrative district in the canton of Bern in Switzerland.

Gsteigwiler belongs to the Small Agglomeration of Interlaken with 25,522 inhabitants (2024).

== History ==
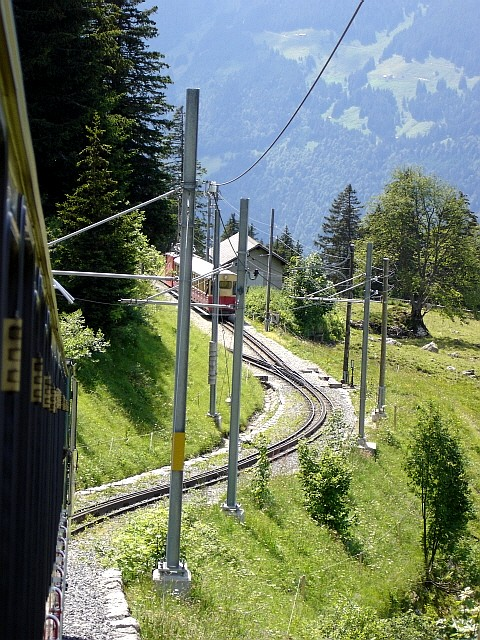
Schynige Platte rack railway from Gsteigwiler

Gsteigwiler is first mentioned in 1333 as Wiler.

The village first appears during the Middle Ages when it was owned by local nobles. In 1310 they donated the village to Interlaken Monastery. It remained in the hands of the monastery until Bern accepted the Protestant Reformation and secularized the monastery in 1528. Under Bernese rule it became part of the new bailiwick of Interlaken and remained part of the district of Interlaken until it was dissolved in 2009.

The village remained isolated until the Wilderswil station of the Bernese Oberland Railway was built nearby in 1890. Two years later the Schynige Platte Railway, a rack railway, was built from Wilderswil, through the village but without a station, to Breitlauenen on the Schynige Platte mountains.

Today most of the population commutes to Interlaken for work, though there is some tourism in the village.

== Geography ==
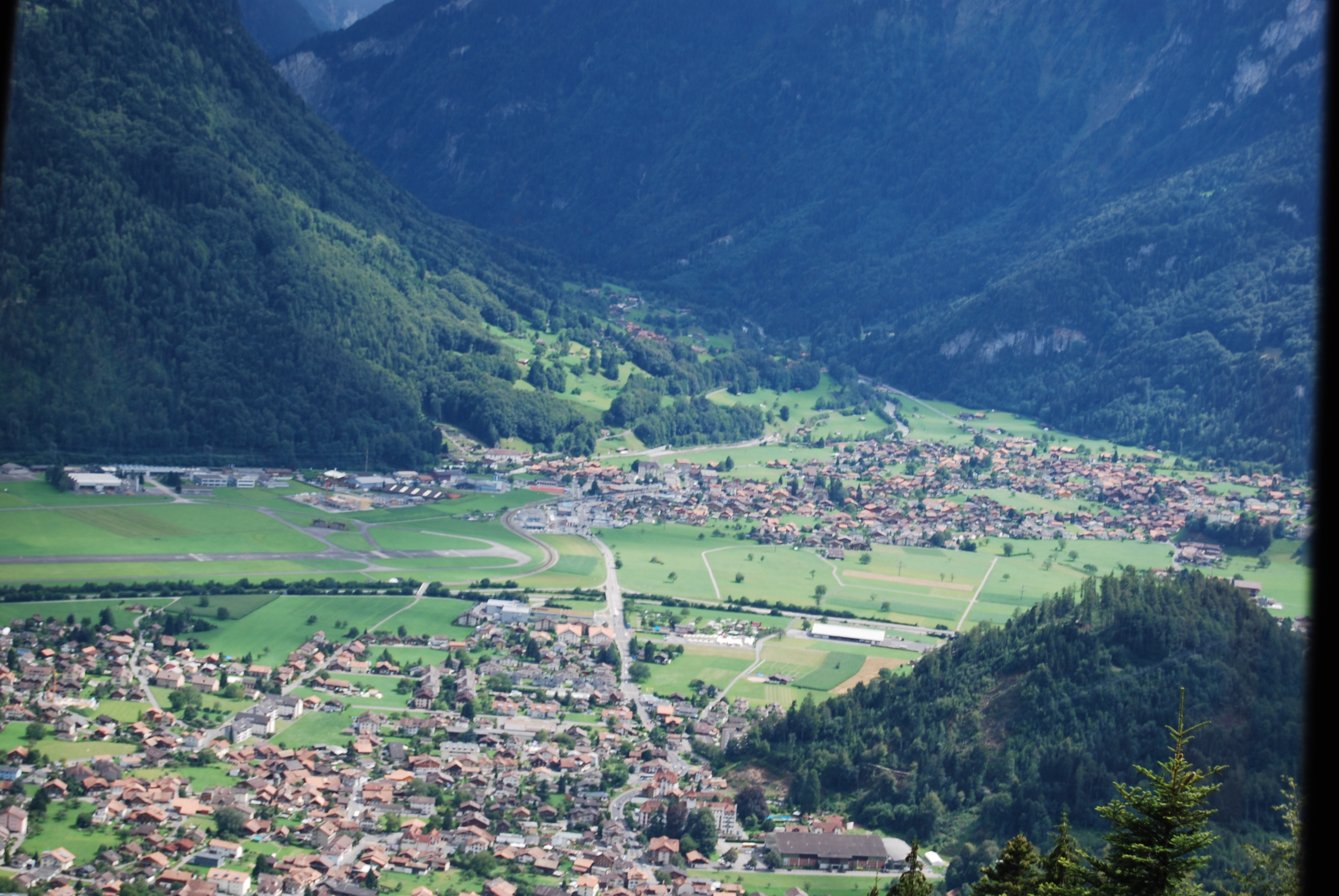
Matten bei Interlaken, Wilderswil and Gsteigwiler. Gsteigwiler is the small village in the middle background in the narrow valley.

Gsteigwiler has an area of 7.02 km^{2} (2.71 sq mi). Of this area, 1.58 km^{2} (0.61 mi^{2}) or 22.5% is used for agricultural purposes, while 4.57 km^{2} (1.76 mi^{2}) or 65.1% is forested. Of the rest of the land, 0.31 km^{2} (0.12 mi^{2}) or 4.4% is settled (buildings or roads), 0.1 km^{2} (25 acres) or 1.4% is either rivers or lakes and 0.47 km^{2} (0.18 mi^{2}) or 6.7% is unproductive land.

Of the built up area, housing and buildings made up 2.3% and transportation infrastructure made up 2.0%. Out of the forested land, 59.0% of the total land area is heavily forested and 5.4% is covered with orchards or small clusters of trees. Of the agricultural land, 10.3% is pastures and 11.7% is used for alpine pastures. All the water in the municipality is flowing water. Of the unproductive areas, 2.4% is unproductive vegetation and 4.3% is too rocky for vegetation.

The original name of the town was "Wiler," which goes back to the Old High German wilari (small town). The prefix Gsteig- was added to distinguish it from the many other Wilers, and means "abrupt mountain slope that one cannot drive a wagon on."

The municipality contains the church of the village Gsteig bei Interlaken, which is the center of the parish for this and eight nearby municipalities, one of the largest parishes in the canton. The church is noted for its murals.

The municipality is located on the western slope of the Schynige Platte mountain region and on the right bank of the Lütschine river.

On 31 December 2009 Amtsbezirk Interlaken, the municipality's former district, was dissolved. On the following day, 1 January 2010, it joined the newly created Verwaltungskreis Interlaken-Oberhasli.

== Coat of arms ==
The blazon of the municipal coat of arms is Argent a Semi Chamois rampant couped Sable.

== Demographics ==
Gsteigwiler has a population (as of December 2020) of 402. As of 2010, 8.2% of the population are resident foreign nationals. Over the last 10 years (2000-2010) the population has changed at a rate of -5.6%. Migration accounted for -5.6%, while births and deaths accounted for -0.4%.

Most of the population (as of 2000) speaks German (462 or 96.9%) as their first language, Portuguese is the second most common (4 or 0.8%) and French is the third (3 or 0.6%). There is 1 person who speaks Italian and 1 person who speaks Romansh.

As of 2008, the population was 52.9% male and 47.1% female. The population was made up of 206 Swiss men (48.5% of the population) and 19 (4.5%) non-Swiss men. There were 184 Swiss women (43.3%) and 16 (3.8%) non-Swiss women. Of the population in the municipality, 160 or about 33.5% were born in Gsteigwiler and lived there in 2000. There were 190 or 39.8% who were born in the same canton, while 89 or 18.7% were born somewhere else in Switzerland, and 28 or 5.9% were born outside of Switzerland.

As of 2010, children and teenagers (0–19 years old) make up 20% of the population, while adults (20–64 years old) make up 64% and seniors (over 64 years old) make up 16%.

As of 2000, there were 247 people who were single and never married in the municipality. There were 190 married individuals, 25 widows or widowers and 15 individuals who are divorced.

As of 2000, there were 58 households that consist of only one person and 21 households with five or more people. In 2000, a total of 160 apartments (71.1% of the total) were permanently occupied, while 46 apartments (20.4%) were seasonally occupied and 19 apartments (8.4%) were empty. The vacancy rate for the municipality, in 2011, was 0.82%.

The historical population is given in the following chart:

== Sights ==
The entire village of Gsteig bei Interlaken is designated as part of the Inventory of Swiss Heritage Sites.

== Politics ==
In the 2011 federal election the most popular party was the Swiss People's Party (SVP) which received 33.4% of the vote. The next three most popular parties were the Conservative Democratic Party (BDP) (18.6%), the Social Democratic Party (SP) (13.2%) and the Green Party (9.5%). In the federal election, a total of 161 votes were cast, and the voter turnout was 46.7%.

== Economy ==
As of 2011, Gsteigwiler had an unemployment rate of 1.86%. As of 2008, there were a total of 174 people employed in the municipality. Of these, there were 32 people employed in the primary economic sector and about 12 businesses involved in this sector. 9 people were employed in the secondary sector and there were 6 businesses in this sector. 133 people were employed in the tertiary sector, with 13 businesses in this sector. There were 212 residents of the municipality who were employed in some capacity, of which females made up 39.2% of the workforce.

In 2008 there were a total of 123 full-time equivalent jobs. The number of jobs in the primary sector was 15, of which 14 were in agriculture and 1 was in forestry or lumber production. The number of jobs in the secondary sector was 8 of which 5 or (62.5%) were in manufacturing and 3 (37.5%) were in construction. The number of jobs in the tertiary sector was 100. In the tertiary sector; 19 or 19.0% were in the movement and storage of goods, 6 or 6.0% were in a hotel or restaurant, 4 or 4.0% were in education and 55 or 55.0% were in health care.

In 2000, there were 50 workers who commuted into the municipality and 160 workers who commuted away. The municipality is a net exporter of workers, with about 3.2 workers leaving the municipality for every one entering. Of the working population, 17.5% used public transportation to get to work, and 50% used a private car.

== Religion ==
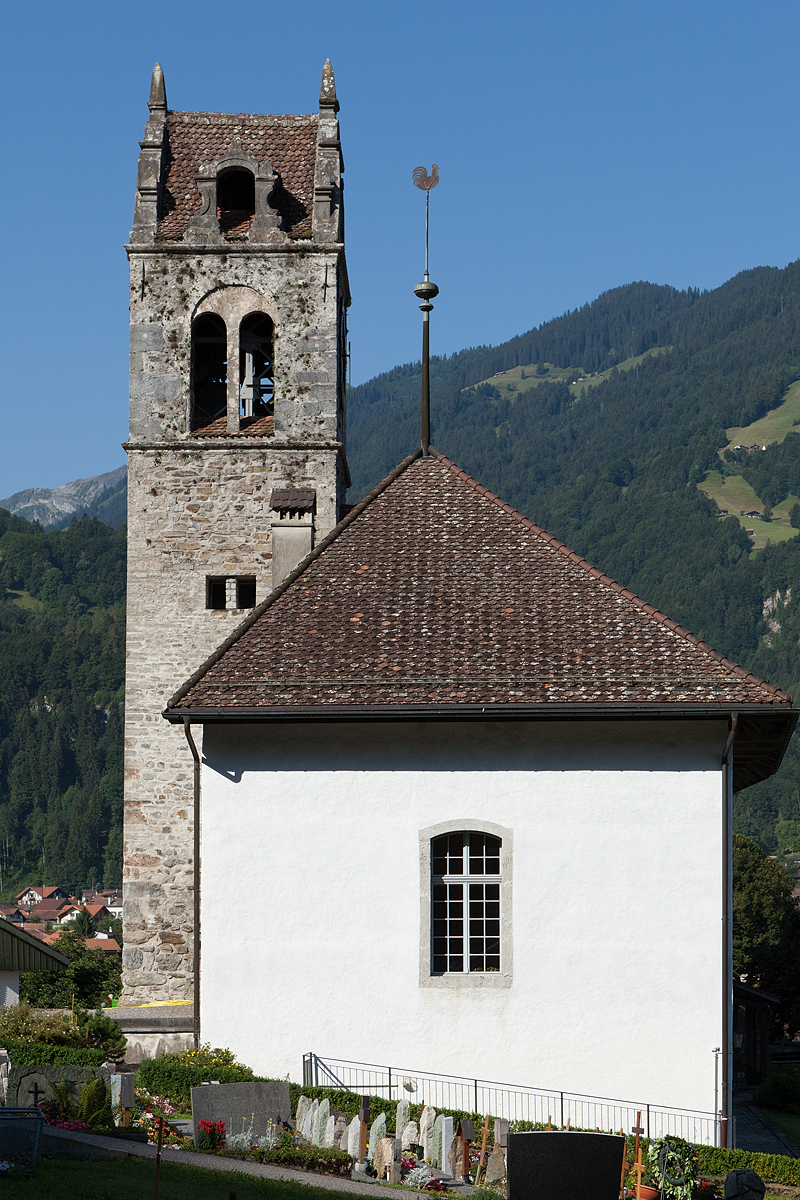
The Swiss Reformed church of Gsteigwiler

From the 2000 census, 40 or 8.4% were Roman Catholic, while 328 or 68.8% belonged to the Swiss Reformed Church. Of the rest of the population, there were 113 individuals (or about 23.69% of the population) who belonged to another Christian church. There were 5 (or about 1.05% of the population) who were Islamic. There was 1 person who was Buddhist. 36 (or about 7.55% of the population) belonged to no church, are agnostic or atheist, and 7 individuals (or about 1.47% of the population) did not answer the question.

== Education ==
In Gsteigwiler about 184 or (38.6%) of the population have completed non-mandatory upper secondary education, and 35 or (7.3%) have completed additional higher education (either university or a Fachhochschule). Of the 35 who completed tertiary schooling, 68.6% were Swiss men, 20.0% were Swiss women.

The Canton of Bern school system provides one year of non-obligatory Kindergarten, followed by six years of Primary school. This is followed by three years of obligatory lower Secondary school where the students are separated according to ability and aptitude. Following the lower Secondary students may attend additional schooling or they may enter an apprenticeship.

During the 2010-11 school year, there were a total of 90 students attending classes in Gsteigwiler. There was one kindergarten class with a total of 8 students in the municipality. Of the kindergarten students, 12.5% were permanent or temporary residents of Switzerland (not citizens). The municipality had one primary class and 21 students. Of the primary students, 9.5% have a different mother language than the classroom language. During the same year, there was one lower secondary class with a total of 8 students. 12.5% have a different mother language than the classroom language. The remainder of the students attend a private or special school.

As of 2000, there were 5 students in Gsteigwiler who came from another municipality, while 33 residents attended schools outside the municipality.

== Transportation ==
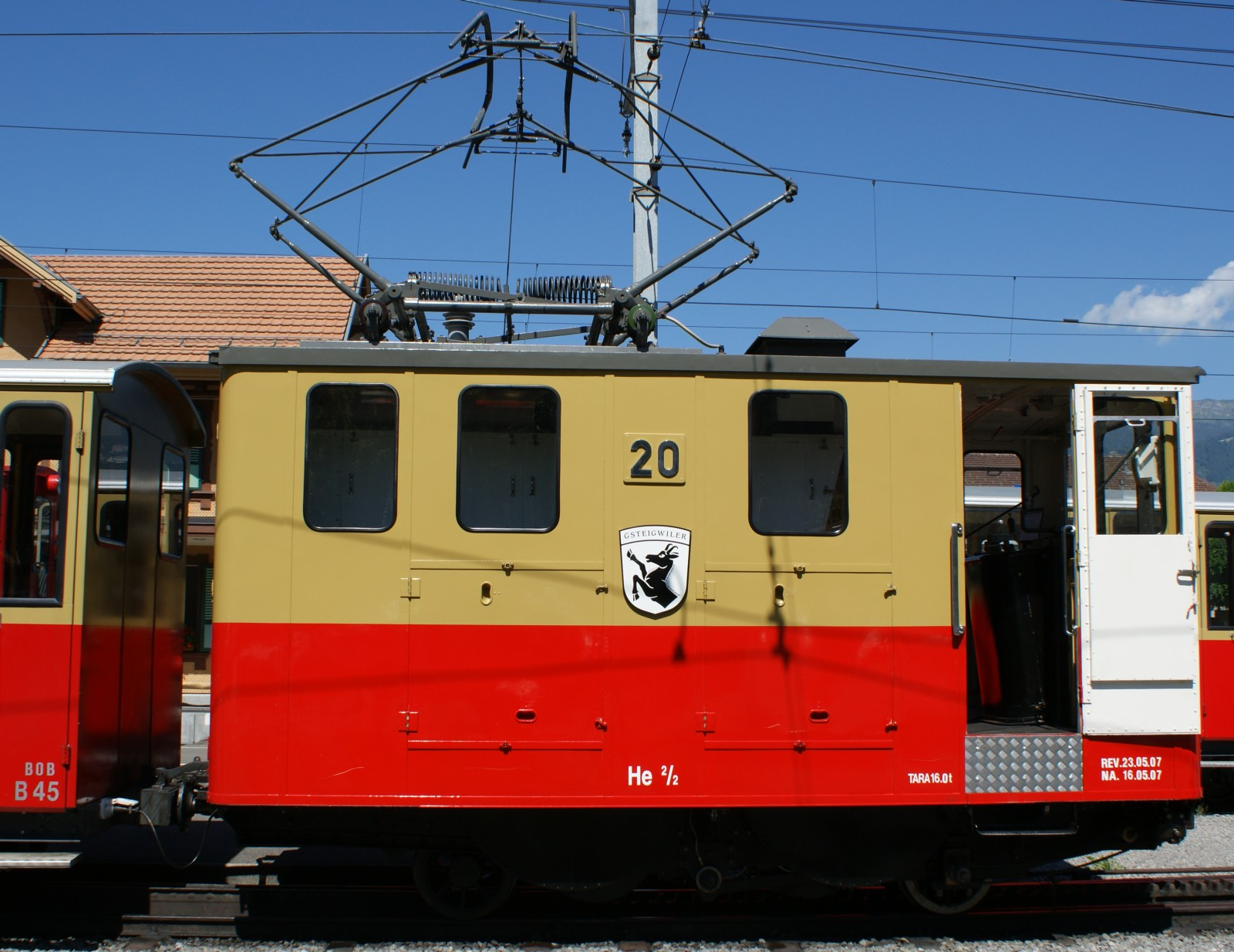
Cog wheel locomotive of the BOB-Schynige Platte railway with the Gsteigwiler Coat of Arms

The Interlaken-Zweilütschinen railway line goes along the valley, but the nearest station is in Wilderswil. In Gsteigwiler there is an interstation for the tourist road of the Schynige Platte.
