= Schynige Platte railway station =

Railway station of the Schynige Platte railway

Schynige Platte
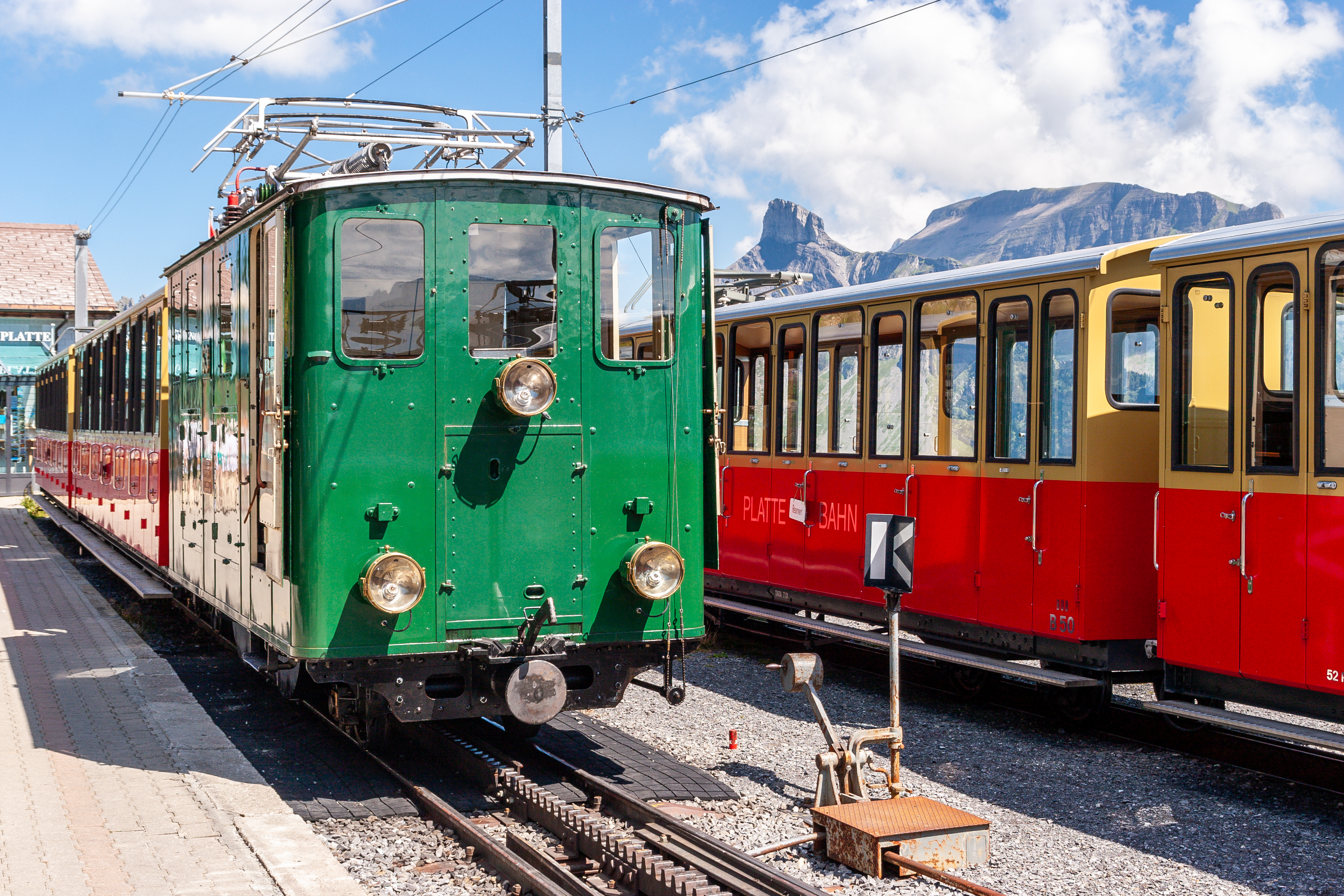
- Trains at Schynige Platte station

General information
- Location: Schynige Platte; Gündlischwand, Bern; Switzerland
- Coordinates: 46.652279°N 7.911036°E
- Elevation: 1,987 m (6,519 ft)
- Line: Schynige Platte railway

Services
Preceding station	Berner Oberland-Bahnen AG	Following station
Breitlauenen towards Wilderswil	Schynige Platte Railway	Terminus
Location
- Location within Switzerland

Schynige Platte is a railway station that is the upper terminus of the Schynige Platte railway, a rack railway that connects Wilderswil with the Schynige Platte mountain in the Bernese Oberland region of Switzerland. The Schynige Platte alpine botanical garden is accessed from the station, whilst a mountain hotel and restaurant is nearby.

Administratively, the station is in the municipality of Gündlischwand in the canton of Bern.

The station is served by the following passenger trains:

Operator	Train Type	Route	Typical Frequency	Notes
Schynige Platte Railway		Wilderswil - Breitlauenen - Schynige Platte	15 per day	Operates in summer only
