= Breitlauenen railway station =

Railway station in canton of Bern, Switzerland

Breitlauenen
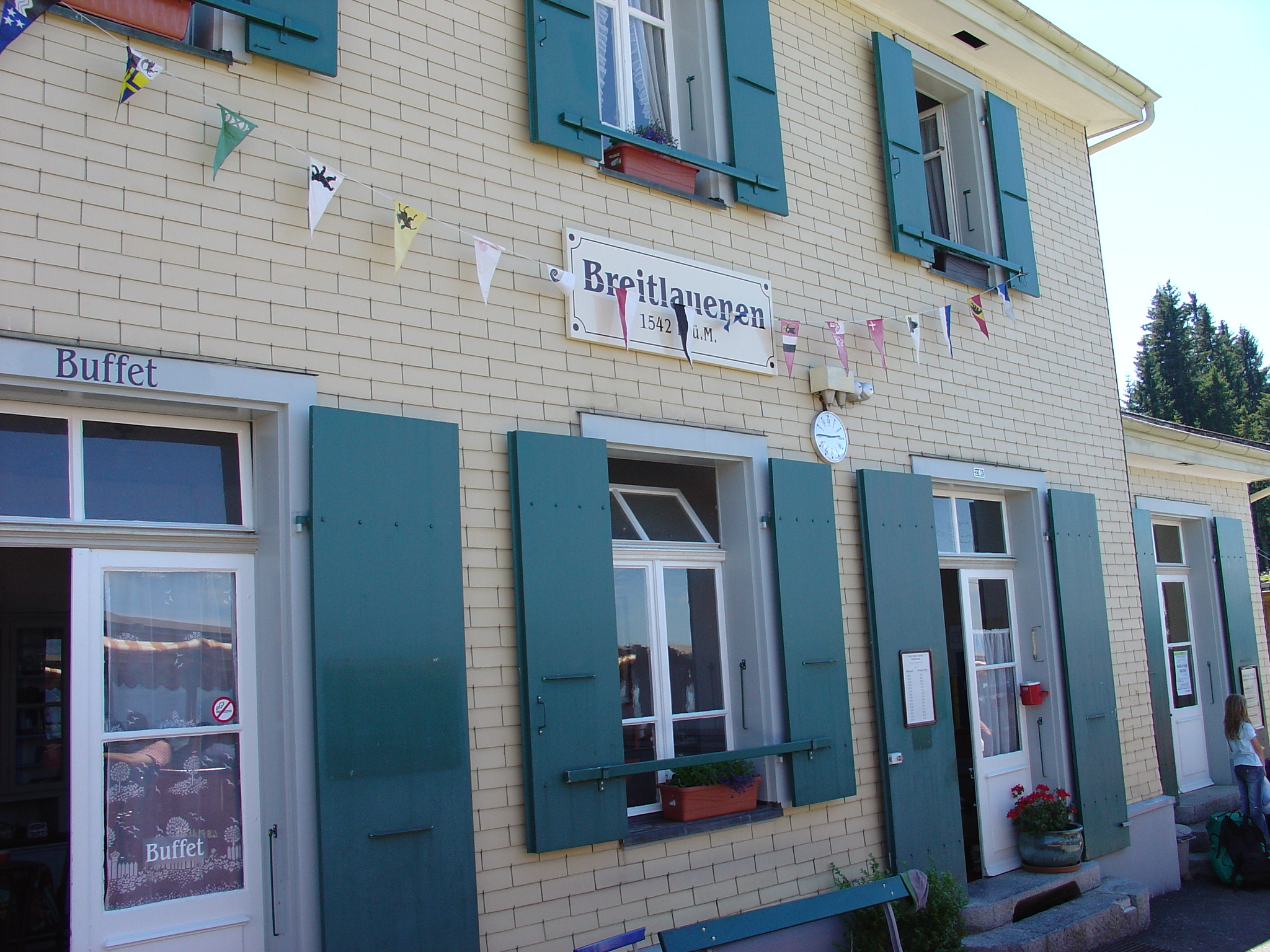

General information
- Location: Breitlauenen; Gsteigwiler, Bern; Switzerland
- Coordinates: 46.659518°N 7.896005°E
- Elevation: 1,542 m (5,059 ft)
- Line: Schynige Platte railway

Services
Preceding station	Berner Oberland-Bahnen AG	Following station
Wilderswil Terminus	Schynige Platte Railway	Schynige Platte Terminus
Location
- Location within Switzerland

Breitlauenen is a railway station on the Schynige Platte railway, a rack railway that connects Wilderswil with the Schynige Platte in the Bernese Oberland region of Switzerland. Breitlauenen is the only intermediate station on the line, and has one of the line's two passing loops.

Administratively, the station is in the municipality of Gsteigwiler in the canton of Bern.

== History ==
Breitlauenen station was created from the purchase of the inn at Breitlauenen when the Schynige Platte Railway was constructed in 1891. The station, the inn and surrounding geography, are extensively covered in late 1890s literature. The inn at the station closed in 1974.

In summer 2010, an open air theater was built at Breitlauenen for performances of Alpenrosentango by Hansjörg Schneider. In 2011, a derailing incident occurred at Breitlauenen with a passenger train impacting with a freight train heading downhill toward Wilderswil. One of the lead carriages was toppled onto its side. There were no injuries. In 2014, students from the local education establishment Bildungszentrum Interlaken, undertook a number of renovation works at Breitlauenen station. In 2015, another derailment happened just beyond the Breitlauenen station that left 100 people stranded.

== Facilities ==
Breitlauenen station retains a bistro restaurant which has a number of specialist food products including cheese from the Breitlauenen Alp and a fruit cake baked by the station manager each morning. A short walk beyond the station is Berghaus Breitlaunen, a converted mountain hut owned and operated by the Gsteigwiler Ski Club. It offers accommodation to tourists and hikers in the area.

== Services ==
The station is served by the following passenger trains:

Operator	Train Type	Route	Typical Frequency	Notes
Schynige Platte Railway		Wilderswil - Breitlauenen - Schynige Platte	15 per day	Operates in summer only
