= Schynige Platte Alpine Garden =

Botanical garden on the Schynige Platte mountain in Switzerland

Coordinates: 46.653537°N 7.911609°E

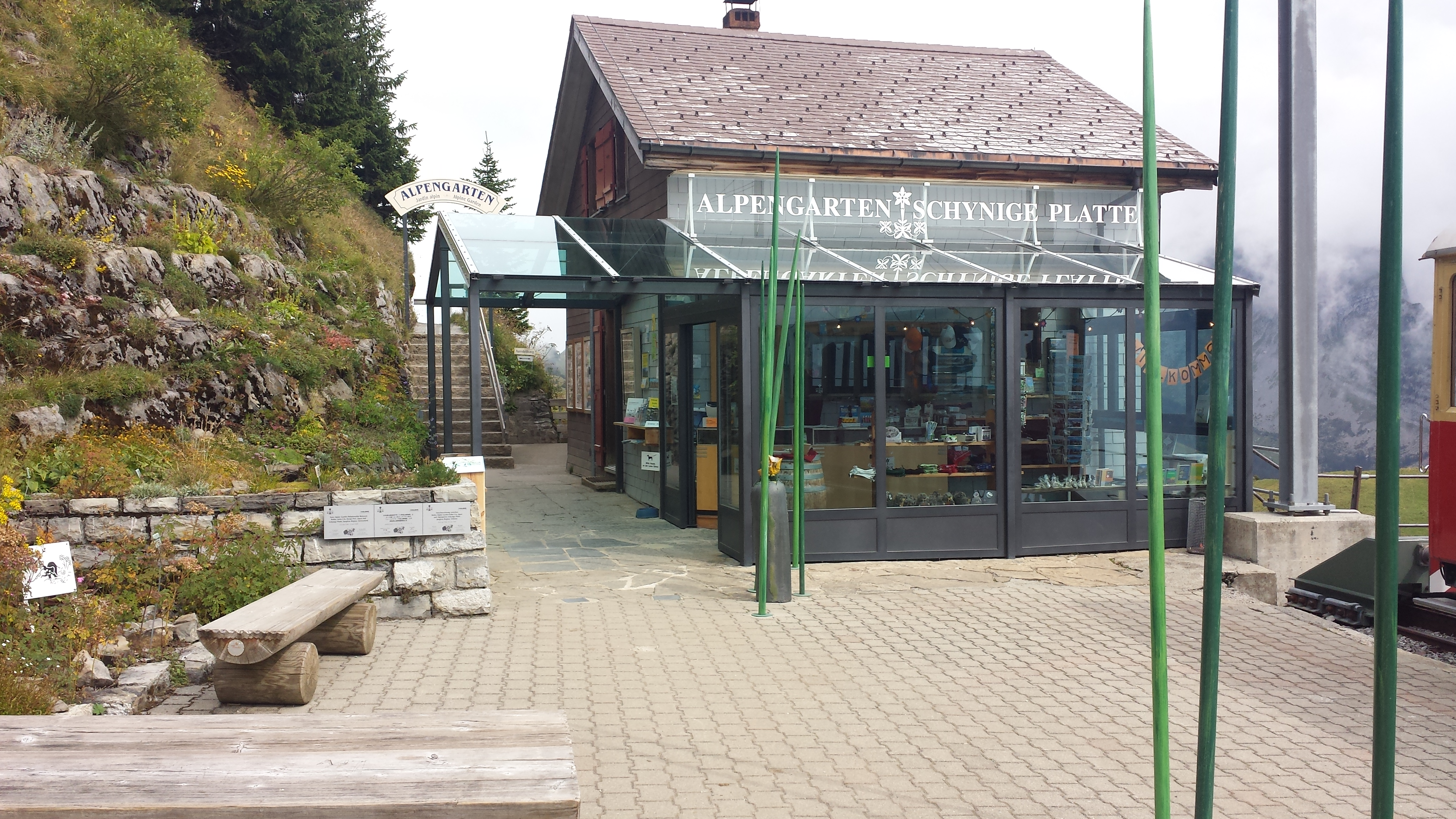
Entrance to the garden from station

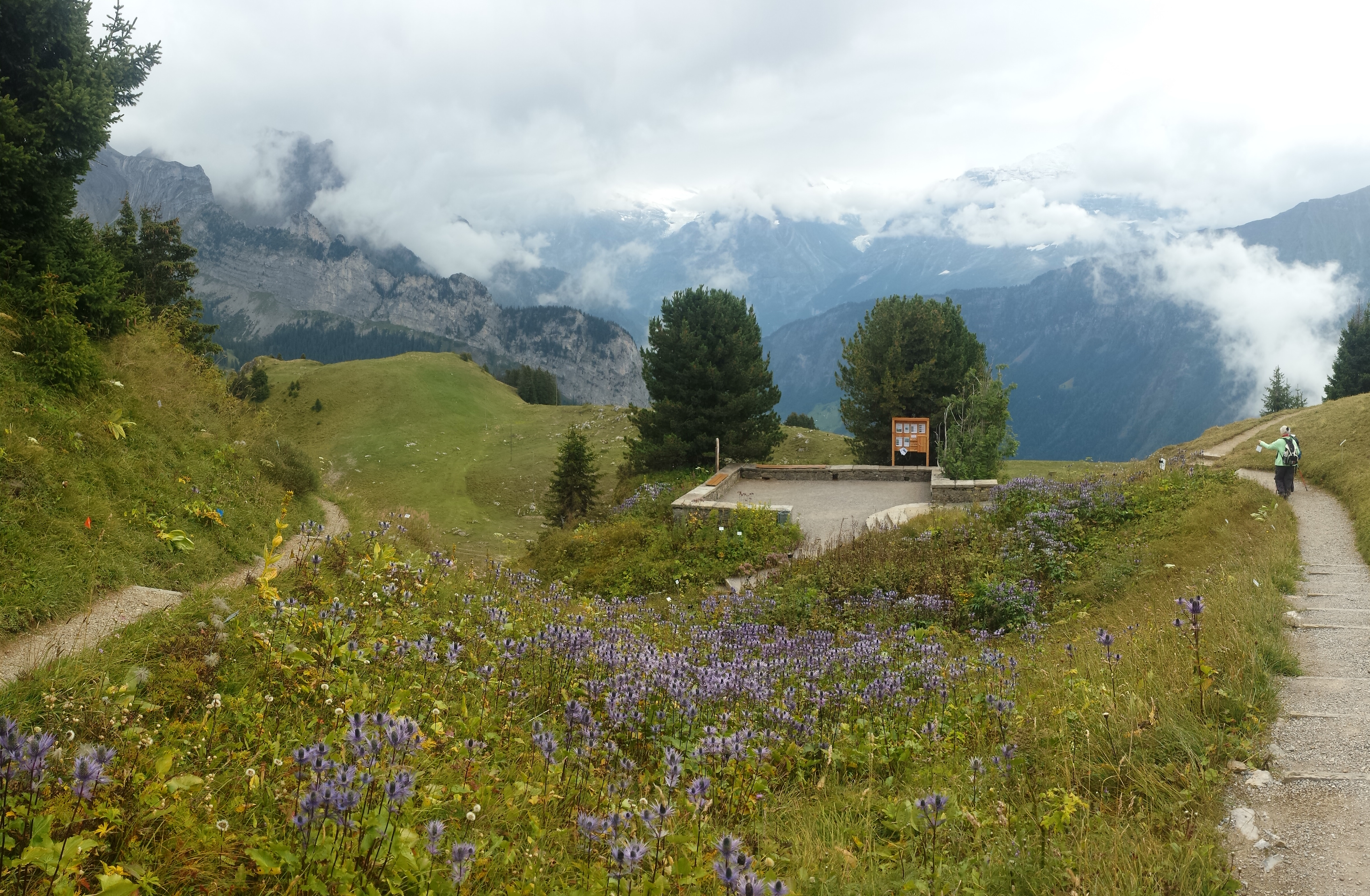
Part of the garden in September

The Schynige Platte Alpine Garden (German: Alpengarten Schynige Platte) is a botanical garden located at an altitude of about 2,000 metres (7,000 ft), near the summit of the Schynige Platte mountain in the Bernese Oberland region of Switzerland. It specialises in research into the high altitude flora of Switzerland, and has a display of over 600 species of plants native to the Swiss Alps. The garden is run by the Schynige Platte Alpine Garden Society, working closely with the Botanical Garden of Bern and the Institute for Plant Sciences at the University of Bern.

The garden was created in 1928, when an area of over 8,000 square metres (86,000 sq ft) was fenced off, ending centuries of use as alpine pasture, and it was opened to the public the following year. Since 1932, an alpine-botanical course has been held at the gardens, under the direction of the Institute of Plant Sciences at the University of Bern.

The garden is accessed directly from the platform of the Schynige Platte station of the Schynige Platte railway, which runs from Wilderswil, where connection is made with Bernese Oberland railway trains from Interlaken. Both garden and railway are open from late May to late October, and admission charges are included in the train ticket. A shop run by the garden society at the entrance sells guides to the garden and other related merchandise, and an adjacent exhibition contains information on the geology, botany and zoology of the Schynige Platte.

Administratively, the garden is in the municipality of Gündlischwand in the canton of Bern.
