= Gündlischwand =

- Municipality
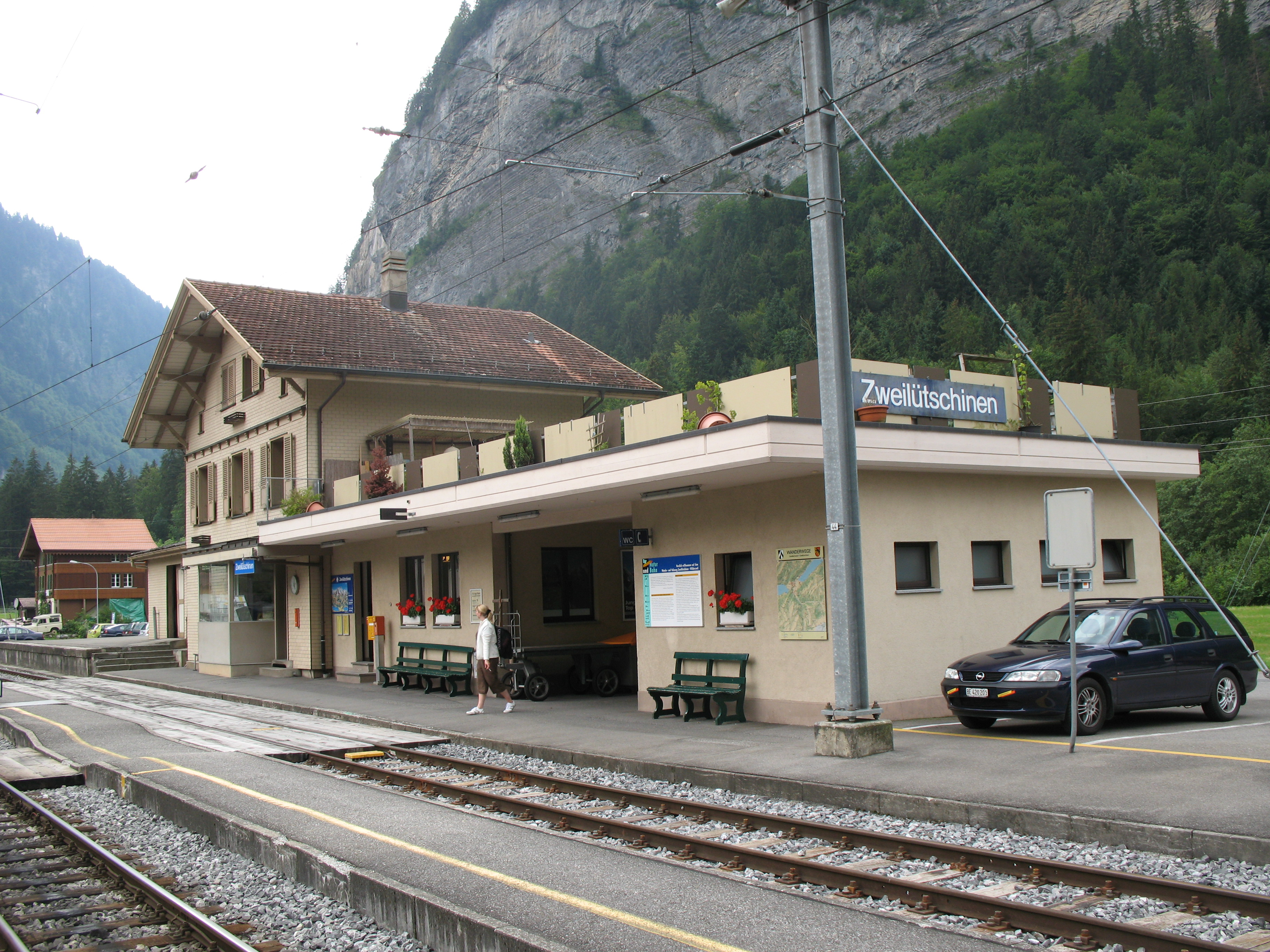
- Zweilütschinen railway station, part of Gündlischwand

- Flag Coat of arms
- Location of Gündlischwand
- Location within Switzerland Location within Canton of Bern
- Coordinates: 46°37′N 7°54′E
- Country: Switzerland
- Canton: Bern
- District: Interlaken-Oberhasli

Government
  - Executive: Gemeinderat with 5 members
  - Mayor: Gemeindepräsident(in); Susanne Gertsch (as of 2026)

Area
  - Total: 16.9 km^{2} (6.5 sq mi)
- Elevation: 660 m (2,170 ft)

Population (December 2020)
  - Total: 351
  - Density: 20.8/km^{2} (53.8/sq mi)
- Time zone: UTC+01:00 (CET)
  - Summer (DST): UTC+02:00 (CEST)
- Postal code: 3815
- SFOS number: 578
- ISO 3166 code: CH-BE
- Localities: Zweilütschinen
- Surrounded by: Iseltwald, Lütschental, Lauterbrunnen, Gsteigwiler and Bönigen
- Website: https://guendlischwand.ch/

Gündlischwand is a village and municipality in the Interlaken-Oberhasli administrative district in the canton of Bern in Switzerland. Besides the village of Gündlischwand, the municipality also includes the hamlet of Zweilütschinen.

== History ==
Gündlischwand is first mentioned in 1331 as Gundlisswant.

During the Middle Ages parts of the Lütschine valley were owned by a variety of local nobles. By 1331, Interlaken Monastery acquired the land and rights to the village of Gündlischwand. It remained under the monastery's control until 1528 when Bern adopted the new faith of the Protestant Reformation and secularized the monastery and all its land. The modern municipality also includes the village of Zweilütschinen at the confluence of the White and Black Lütschine rivers. In 1580 a bridge was built over the rivers at Zweilütschinen, allowing more local trade to flow through the village.

In the late 16th century rich ore deposits were discovered in the Lauterbrunnen valley. After the ore was mined, it was moved to the blast furnace at Schmelziwald near Gündlischwand for smelting. The mine closed in 1715 and the furnace, hammer mill, foundry and village fell into ruin, though parts are still visible. In 1890 the Bernese Oberland railway built a station and depot at Zweilütschinen, providing an easy, year round transportation connection.

== Geography ==
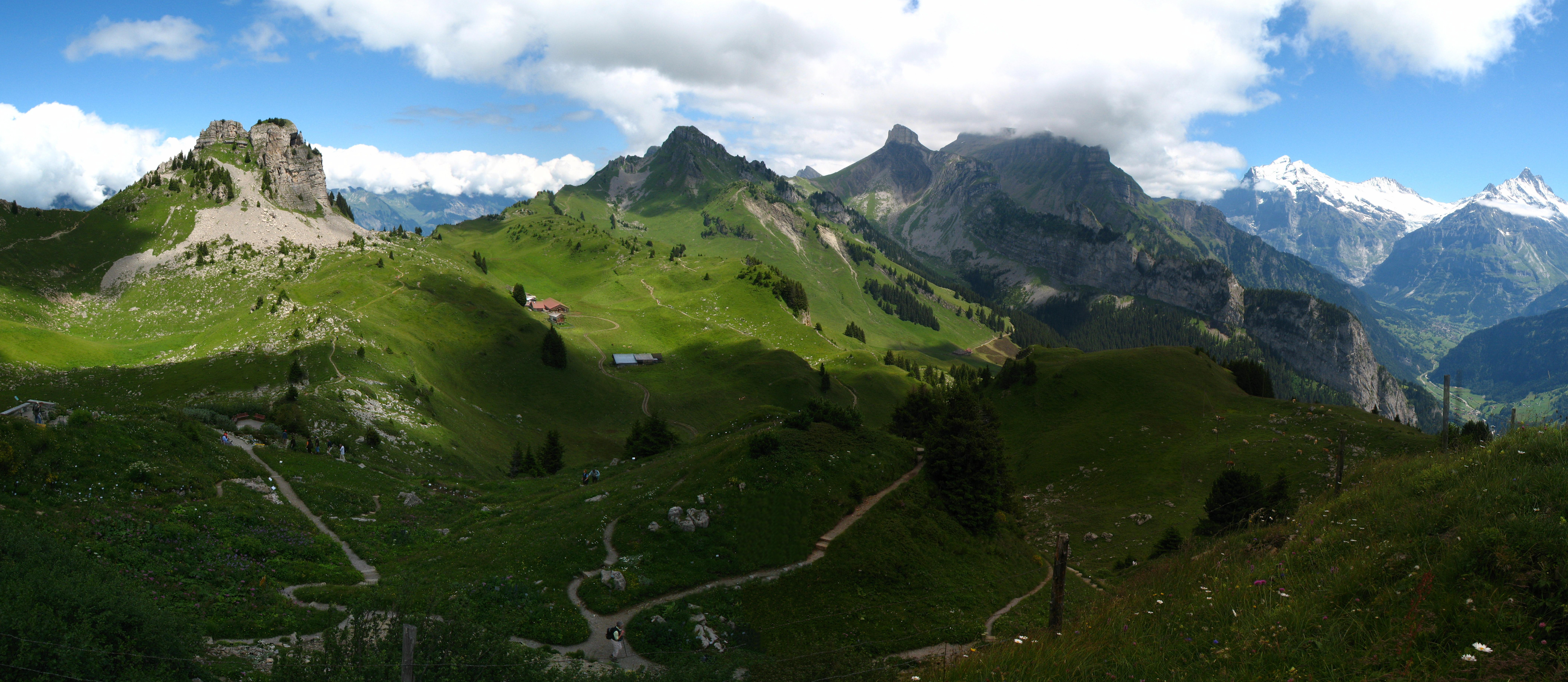
Looking from the Schynige Platte toward the Lütschine river valley

Gündlischwand lies in the Bernese Oberland in the Alps on the Black Lütschine river. The municipality includes the hamlet of Zweilütschinen, so named because it is the point of confluence of the White and Black Lütschine rivers. To the north of the Black Lütschine, the municipality extends up the Sägis Valley and its small lake, and includes the slopes up to the summits of the Schynige Platte, Loucherhorn, Roteflue, Faulhorn and Sägissa (2,465 m (8,087 ft)) mountains. Both the Schynige Platte Alpine Garden and the adjoining summit station of the Schynige Platte railway are within the municipality. To the south of the Black Lütschine, the municipality includes the north-western slopes of the Männlichen.

Gündlischwand has an area of 16.84 km^{2} (6.50 sq mi). Of this area, 5.47 km^{2} (2.11 mi^{2}) or 32.4% is used for agricultural purposes, while 6.73 km^{2} (2.60 mi^{2}) or 39.8% is forested. Of the rest of the land, 0.28 km^{2} (0.11 mi^{2}) or 1.7% is settled (buildings or roads), 0.2 km^{2} (0.077 mi^{2}) or 1.2% is either rivers or lakes and 4.2 km^{2} (1.6 mi^{2}) or 24.9% is unproductive land.

Of the built up area, housing and buildings made up 0.5% and transportation infrastructure made up 0.7%. Out of the forested land, 35.3% of the total land area is heavily forested and 2.7% is covered with orchards or small clusters of trees. Of the agricultural land, 3.1% is pastures and 29.2% is used for alpine pastures. Of the water in the municipality, 0.4% is in lakes and 0.8% is in rivers and streams. Of the unproductive areas, 8.9% is unproductive vegetation and 15.9% is too rocky for vegetation.

On 31 December 2009 Amtsbezirk Interlaken, the municipality's former district, was dissolved. On the following day, 1 January 2010, it joined the newly created Verwaltungskreis Interlaken-Oberhasli.

Along with eight other municipalities, Gündlischwand belongs to the church parish of Gsteig bei Interlaken in the municipality of Gsteigwiler.

== Coat of arms ==
The blazon of the municipal coat of arms is Per pale Sable and Argent overall a Chevron wavy reaching the Chief counterchanged.

== Demographics ==
Gündlischwand has a population (as of December 2020) of 351. As of 2010, 3.6% of the population are resident foreign nationals. Over the last 10 years (2000-2010) the population has changed at a rate of -2.4%. Migration accounted for 0.7%, while births and deaths accounted for -1%.

Most of the population (as of 2000) speaks German (253 or 96.2%) as their first language, Serbo-Croatian is the second most common (4 or 1.5%) and English is the third (3 or 1.1%). There are 2 people who speak French.

As of 2008, the population was 49.6% male and 50.4% female. The population was made up of 133 Swiss men (47.5% of the population) and 6 (2.1%) non-Swiss men. There were 137 Swiss women (48.9%) and 4 (1.4%) non-Swiss women. Of the population in the municipality, 93 or about 35.4% were born in Gündlischwand and lived there in 2000. There were 117 or 44.5% who were born in the same canton, while 32 or 12.2% were born somewhere else in Switzerland, and 16 or 6.1% were born outside of Switzerland.

As of 2010, children and teenagers (0–19 years old) make up 22.9% of the population, while adults (20–64 years old) make up 58.9% and seniors (over 64 years old) make up 18.2%.

As of 2000, there were 108 people who were single and never married in the municipality. There were 125 married individuals, 20 widows or widowers and 10 individuals who are divorced.

As of 2000, there were 44 households that consist of only one person and 6 households with five or more people. In 2000, a total of 101 apartments (64.3% of the total) were permanently occupied, while 47 apartments (29.9%) were seasonally occupied and 9 apartments (5.7%) were empty. The vacancy rate for the municipality, in 2011, was 1.12%.

The historical population is given in the following chart:

== Politics ==
In the 2011 federal election the most popular party was the Swiss People's Party (SVP) which received 39.1% of the vote. The next three most popular parties were the Conservative Democratic Party (BDP) (25.8%), the Green Party (9.3%) and the FDP.The Liberals (9%). In the federal election, a total of 100 votes were cast, and the voter turnout was 44.8%.

== Economy ==
As of 2011, Gündlischwand had an unemployment rate of 1%. As of 2008, there were a total of 116 people employed in the municipality. Of these, there were 3 people employed in the primary economic sector and about 3 businesses involved in this sector. 9 people were employed in the secondary sector and there were 4 businesses in this sector. 104 people were employed in the tertiary sector, with 11 businesses in this sector. There were 139 residents of the municipality who were employed in some capacity, of which females made up 42.4% of the workforce.

In 2008 there were a total of 101 full-time equivalent jobs. There was one job in agriculture. The number of jobs in the secondary sector was 7 of which 2 or (28.6%) were in manufacturing and 5 (71.4%) were in construction. The number of jobs in the tertiary sector was 93. In the tertiary sector; 2 or 2.2% were in wholesale or retail sales or the repair of motor vehicles, 67 or 72.0% were in the movement and storage of goods, 18 or 19.4% were in a hotel or restaurant, 4 or 4.3% were in education.

In 2000, there were 80 workers who commuted into the municipality and 88 workers who commuted away. The municipality is a net exporter of workers, with about 1.1 workers leaving the municipality for every one entering. Of the working population, 25.2% used public transportation to get to work, and 38.8% used a private car.

== Religion ==
From the 2000 census, 25 or 9.5% were Roman Catholic, while 214 or 81.4% belonged to the Swiss Reformed Church. Of the rest of the population, there were 4 members of an Orthodox church (or about 1.52% of the population), there was 1 individual who belongs to the Christian Catholic Church, and there were 12 individuals (or about 4.56% of the population) who belonged to another Christian church. 5 (or about 1.90% of the population) belonged to no church, are agnostic or atheist, and 8 individuals (or about 3.04% of the population) did not answer the question.

== Education ==
In Gündlischwand about 127 or (48.3%) of the population have completed non-mandatory upper secondary education, and 11 or (4.2%) have completed additional higher education (either university or a Fachhochschule). Of the 11 who completed tertiary schooling, 72.7% were Swiss men, 18.2% were Swiss women.

The Canton of Bern school system provides one year of non-obligatory Kindergarten, followed by six years of Primary school. This is followed by three years of obligatory lower Secondary school where the students are separated according to ability and aptitude. Following the lower Secondary students may attend additional schooling or they may enter an apprenticeship.

During the 2010-11 school year, there were a total of 31 students attending classes in Gündlischwand. There was one kindergarten class with a total of 9 students in the municipality. The municipality had one primary class and 16 students. During the same year, there was one lower secondary class with a total of 6 students.

As of 2000, there were 5 students in Gündlischwand who came from another municipality, while 4 residents attended schools outside the municipality.

== Transport ==
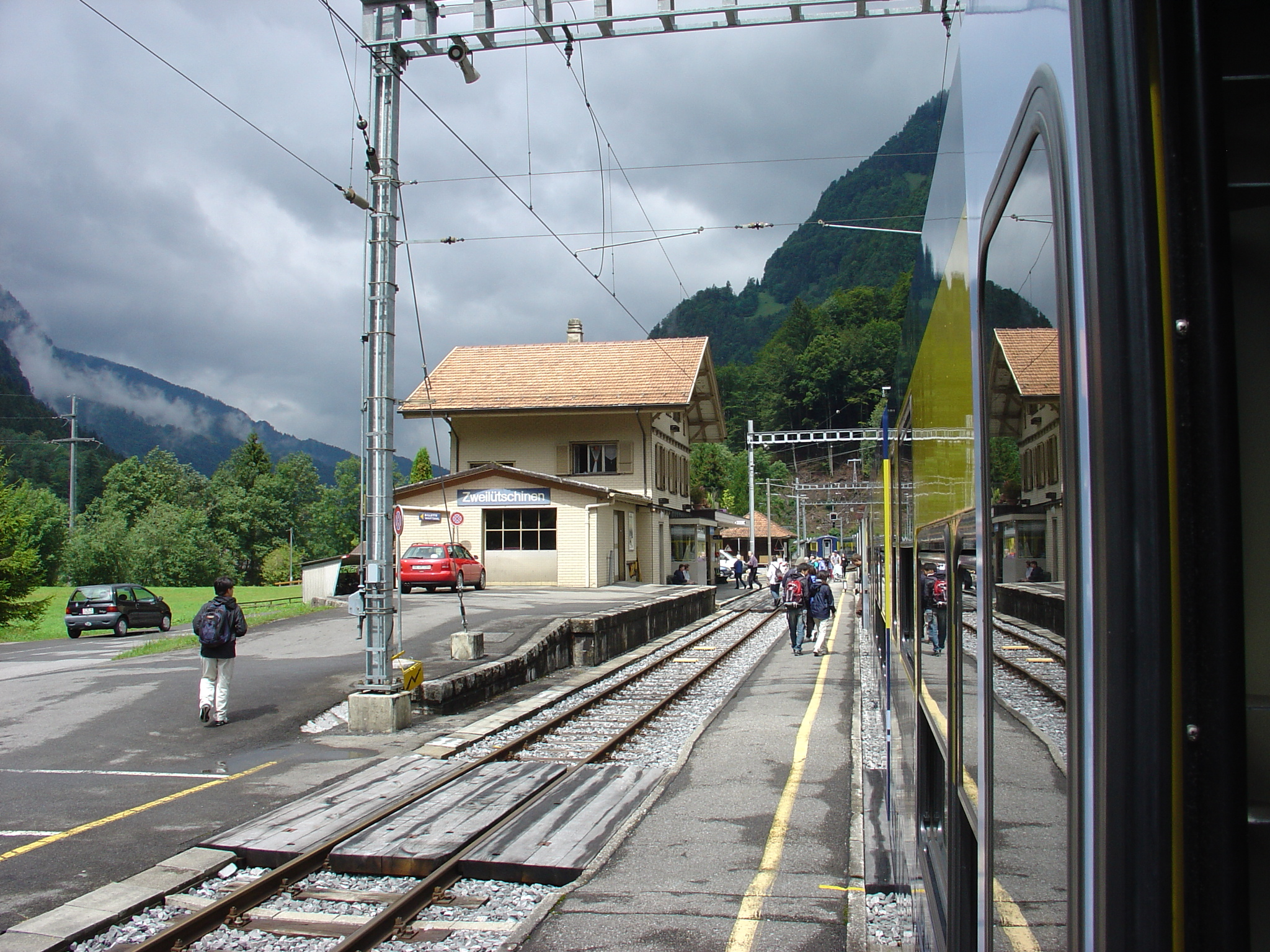
Zweilütschinen railway station

The Zweilütschinen railway station is on the Berner Oberland Bahn, whose trains operate services to Interlaken Ost, Grindelwald and Lauterbrunnen on an hourly or half-hourly frequency.

Zweilütschinen is the operating centre of the Berner Oberland Bahn, with its depot and workshop adjacent to the station.
