= Schynige Platte Railway =

Railway in Switzerland

Coordinates: 46°39′24.69″N 7°54′17.87″E

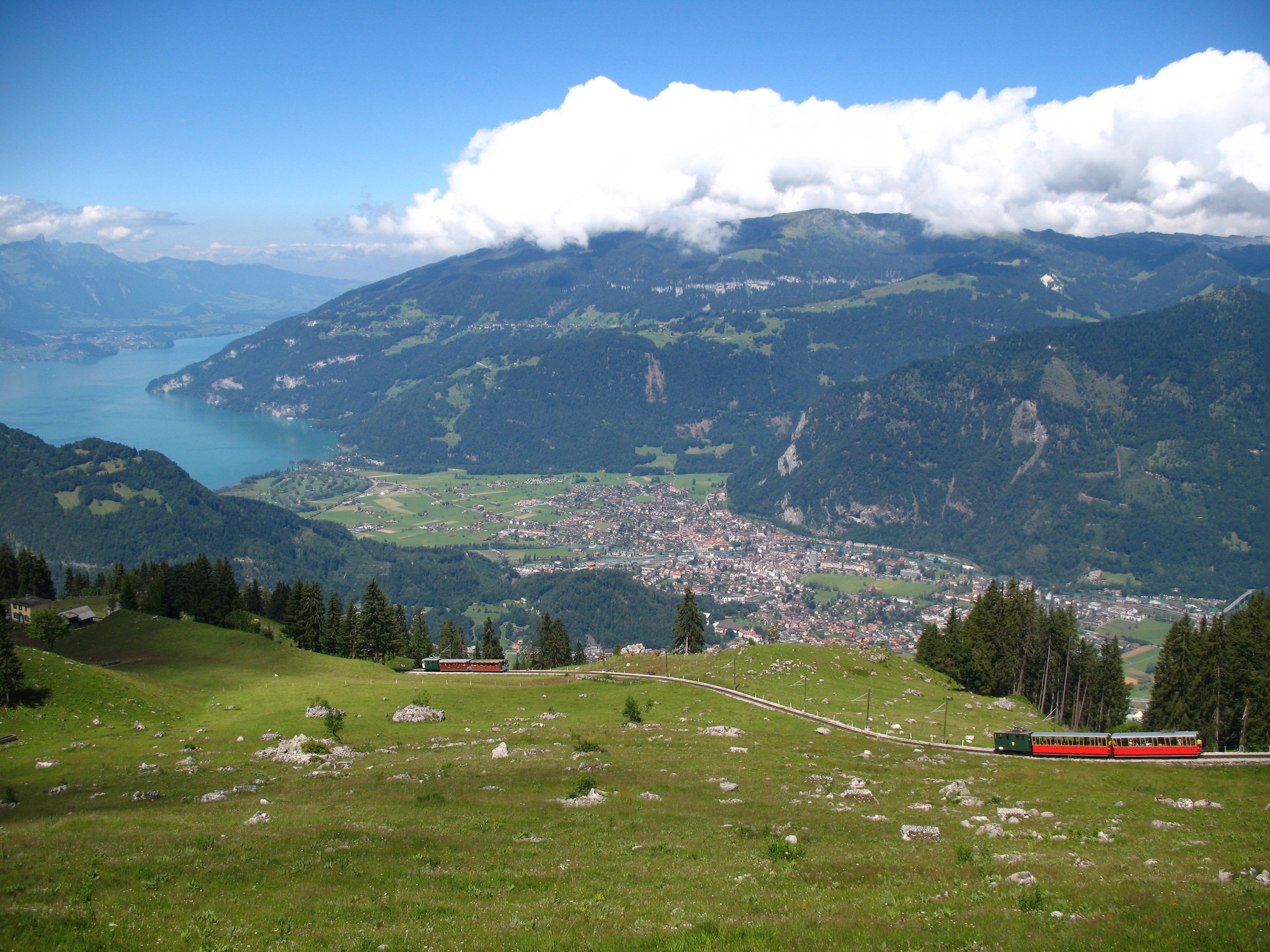
- Trains on the Schynige Platte above Interlaken and Lake Thun

Overview
- Native name: Schynige Platte-Bahn SPB
- Status: Operating in summer season
- Owner: Berner Oberland-Bahnen AG
- Locale: Bernese Highlands
- Termini: Wilderswil; Schynige Platte
- Stations: 4
- Website: SPB

Service
- Type: Mountain rack railway
- Services: 1
- Operator(s): BOB

History
- Opened: 1893

Technical
- Line length: 7.26 km (4.51 mi)
- Number of tracks: Single track with passing loops
- Character: Touristic railway
- Rack system: Riggenbach rack
- Track gauge: 800 mm (2 ft 7 1/2 in)
- Electrification: 100%, 1500 V DC, overhead wire
- Highest elevation: 1,967 m (6,453 ft)
- Maximum incline: 1 in 4 (250‰ or 25%)

The Schynige Platte Railway (German: Schynige Platte-Bahn, SPB) is a mountain railway in the Bernese Highlands area of Switzerland, which connects the town of Wilderswil, near Interlaken, with the famous wildflower gardens of the Schynige Platte.

An impressively and varied natural landscape unfolds on the journey, including forests, Alpine pastures and views of the Bernese Oberland. Towards the top of the line, there are also views of the imposing peaks of the Eiger, Mönch and Jungfrau. The line opened, using steam traction, in May 1893, and was electrified in 1914.

The line is owned by the Berner Oberland-Bahnen AG, a company that also owns the Berner Oberland-Bahn. Through that company it is part of the Allianz - Jungfrau Top of Europe marketing alliance, which also includes the separately owned Wengernalpbahn, Jungfraubahn, Bergbahn Lauterbrunnen–Mürren, Harderbahn, and Firstbahn.

== History ==
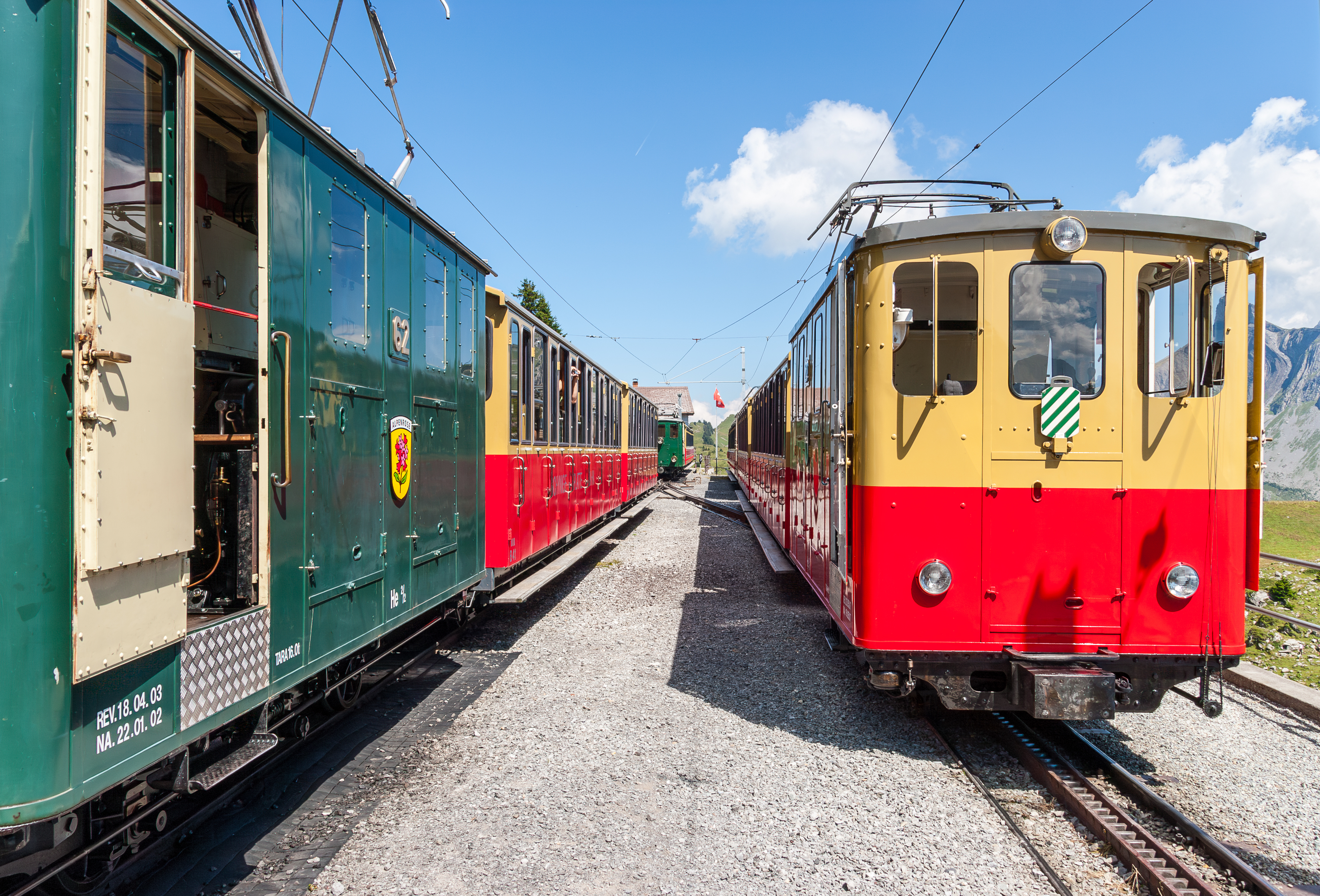
Trains at Schynige Platte station

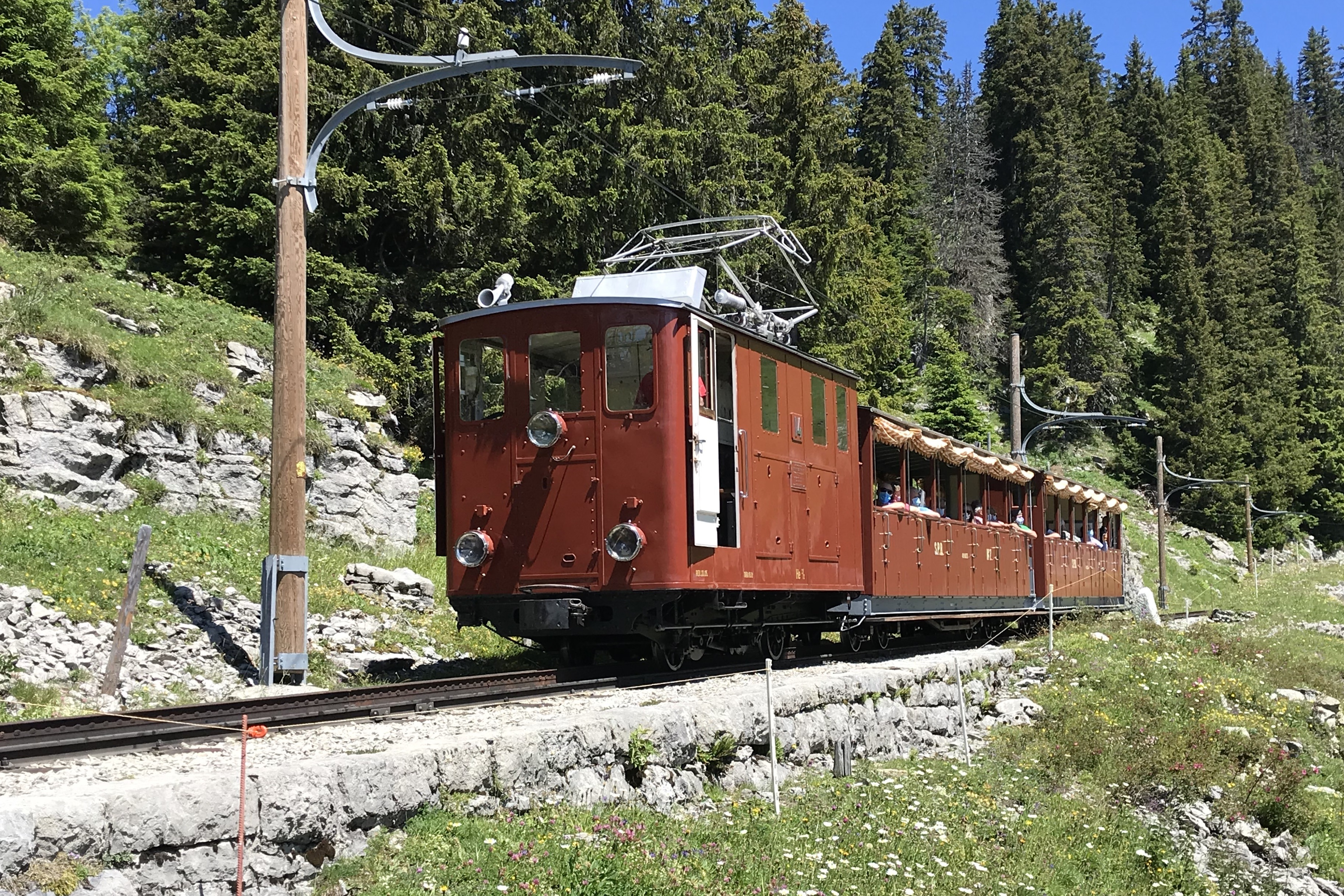
No. 14, one of the original locomotives built for the line's electrification, in heritage livery by Bigelti, 2020

The key milestones in the history of the line are:

- 1890 The concession for the line was given and the company is founded on 16 September.
- 1891 Construction starts.
- 1893 A train with special guests reaches the top on 5 May and the line opens to the public on 14 June.
- 1896 The Berner Oberland-Bahn become the new owners.
- 1913 The first electric trial run operates on 15 October.
- 1914 Public electric services start on 9 May.
- 1928 The Schynige Platte Alpine Garden opens on the Schynige Platte.
- 1964 The Schynige Platte Railway receives 4 locomotives from the Wengernalpbahn.
- 1970 The Schynige Platte Railway receives 2 more locomotives from the Wengernalpbahn.
- 1978 The Schynige Platte Railway receives another locomotive from the Wengernalpbahn.
- 2001 Teddyland opens on the Schynige Platte on 7 June.

== Route ==
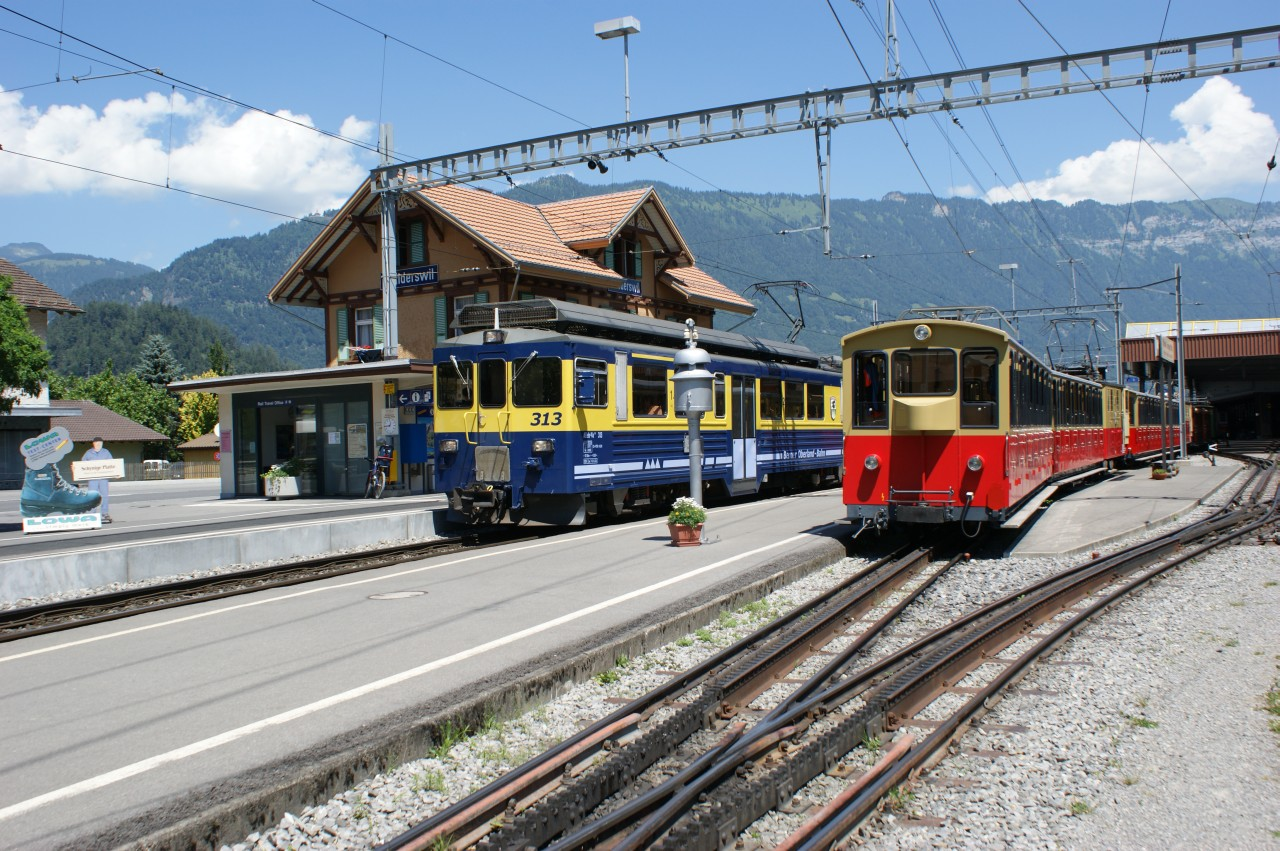
Interchange between lines at Wilderswil

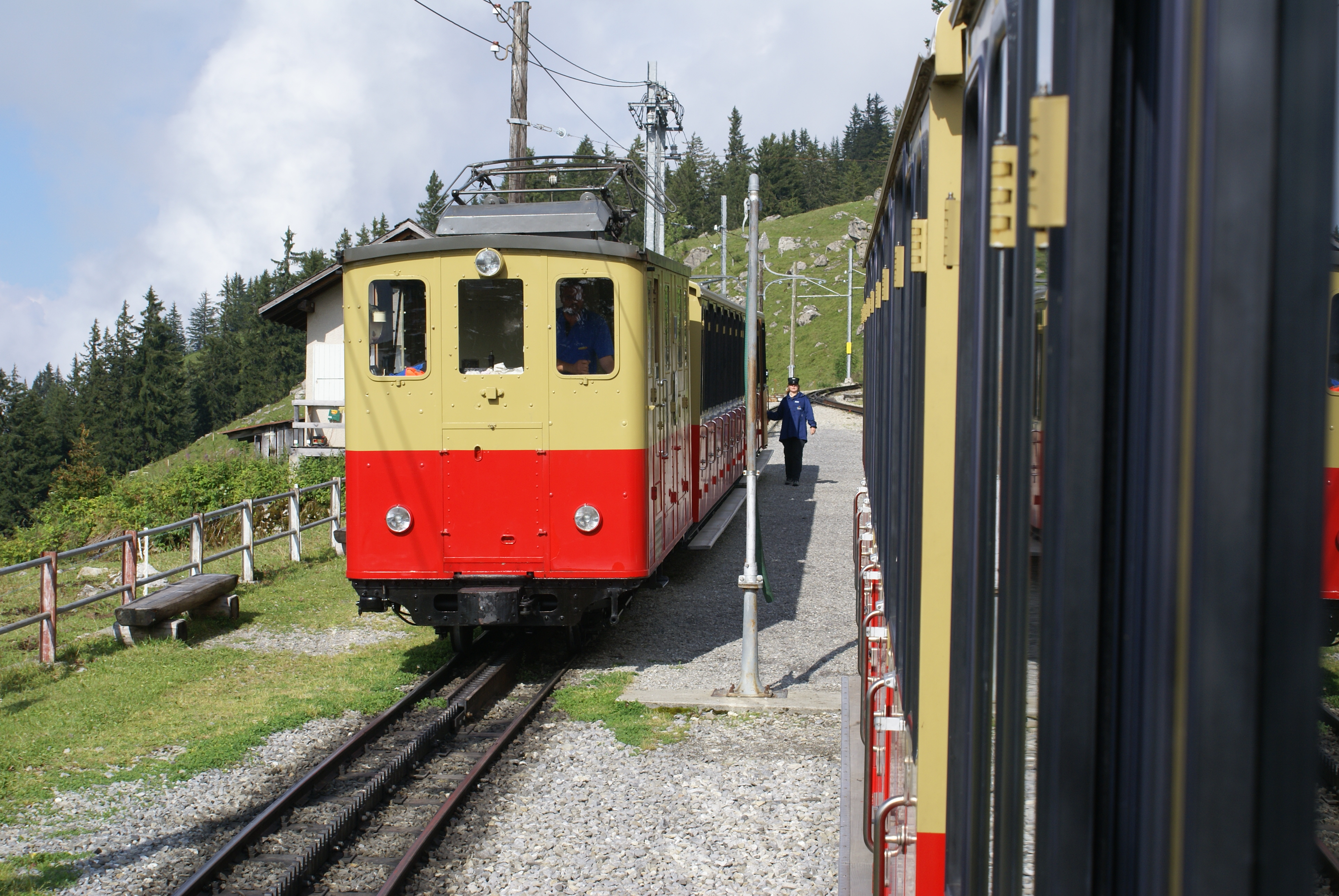
Trains pass at Breitlauenen

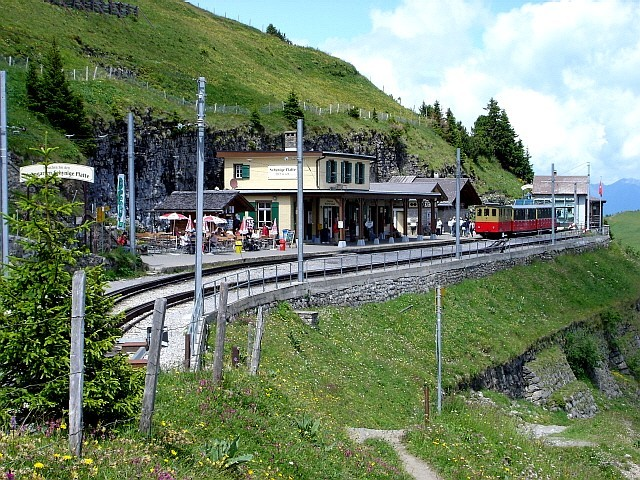
The terminus at Schynige Platte

The Schynige Platte Railway commences from Wilderswil station at an altitude of 584 m (1,916 ft), where it connects with the 1,000 mm (3 ft 3 3/8 in) metre gauge line of the Berner Oberland-Bahn (BOB), which operates to Interlaken Ost, Lauterbrunnen and Grindelwald. Wilderswil is within the built-up area around Interlaken, and buses also provide a connection from the station to the town centre and Interlaken West station.

The line initially runs alongside the BOB for just over 0.5 km (0.31 mi) before crossing the Lütschine river and starting its climb up the valley side. Initially it passes through forest, with a passing loop at Rotenegg at an altitude of 886 m (2,907 ft). The forest is followed by alpine pastures which offer views of the Bernese Oberland including the town of Interlaken bracketed by Lake Thun and Lake Brienz. Another passing loop is located at Breitlauenen station, the line's only intermediate station at an altitude of 1,542 m (5,059 ft).

In the final stretch of the ascent, views open up of the glistening giants of the Eiger, Mönch and Jungfrau mountains to the south. The line terminates at Schynige Platte station at an altitude of 1,987 m (6,520 ft), after a journey of 7.25 km (4.50 mi) and a height gain of 1,420 m (4,659 ft). The Schynige Platte alpine botanical garden, a hotel and a mountain restaurant are all located near the summit station.

== Operation ==
The Schynige Platte Railway is built to 800 mm gauge (2 ft 7 1/2 in gauge) and is electrified using a 1500 V DC overhead supply. It is a rack railway, using the Riggenbach rack with a maximum gradient of 25% (1 in 4). The line's depot and workshops are located adjacent to Wilderswil station.

The line is timetabled to only operate in summer months, from the beginning of June to the middle of October. As the upper section of the route, between Breitlauenen and the summit, is subject to heavy winter snowfall and occasional avalanches, the overhead catenary on this section is dismantled after the last train of the year, and reinstated before the first train of the next year can run. The process of removal or replacement normally takes a team of six employees a day to complete, and employs the line's one remaining steam locomotive.

The line provides some 15 return services per day, with services every 40 minutes and a journey time of 52 minutes. Any given service may be operated by a convoy of more than one train, with each train usually comprising an electric rack locomotive and two coaches. The locomotive always operates at the lower end of the train, pushing the train up the mountain and leading it down.

== Rolling stock ==
The line still operates one of its original steam locomotives, together with the four electric locomotives built for the line's electrification. A number of additional similar locomotives, together with matching coaches, were bought from the Wengernalpbahn but had (until the recent delivery of additional train sets) often returned to this line to help in winter sports traffic.

The line uses, or has used, the following locomotives:

No.	Name	Arms	Type	Power	Weight	Builder	Date	With SPB	Notes
5			H 2/3		13t / 16.7t	SLM	1894	1894-	Steam locomotive (0-4-2RT). Used in the seasonal installation or removal of the catenary on the upper section of the line. Also operates a small number of public trains and is available for charter trains.
11	Wilderswil		He 2/2	220KW	16.3t	SLM/BBC	1914	1914-	now (2014) painted dark grey
12	(Gsteigwiler)		He 2/2	220KW	16.3t	SLM/BBC	1914	1914-	Operated the first electric service on the Schynige Platte line; a trial run in October 1913. Has been refurbished and carries a colour scheme representative of that period.
13	Matten		He 2/2	220KW	16.3t	SLM/BBC	1914	1914-	
14	(Gündlischwand)		He 2/2	220KW	16.3t	SLM/BBC	1914	1914-	
15			He 2/2	220KW	16t	SLM/Alioth	1910	1964–1992	Originally WAB 55, 1992 back to WAB as shunter Lauterbrunnen, 1997 monument in Münchenstein BL as WAB 55 (former Alioth factory)
16	Anemone		He 2/2	220KW	16t	SLM/Alioth	1910	1964-	Originally WAB 56
17			He 2/2	220KW	16t	SLM/Alioth	1910	1964–1996	Originally WAB 57, withdrawn 1996
18	(Krokus); Gündlischwand		He 2/2	220KW	16t	SLM/Alioth	1910	1964-	Originally WAB 58
19	Flühbluhme		He 2/2	220KW	16t	SLM/Alioth	1911	1964-	Originally WAB 59
20	(Edelweiss); Gsteigwiler		He 2/2	220KW	16t	SLM/Alioth	1911	1970-	Originally WAB 60
61	Enzian		He 2/2	220KW	16t	SLM/Alioth	1912	1991	Originally WAB 61, also on the SPB as number 21 between 1970 and 1981, rebuilt 1992
62	Alpenrose		He 2/2	220KW	16t	SLM/Alioth	1912	1989-	Originally WAB 62, rebuilt 1989
63	(Silberdistel)		He 2/2	220KW	16t	SLM/Alioth	1912	1996-	Originally WAB 63, rebuilt 1996

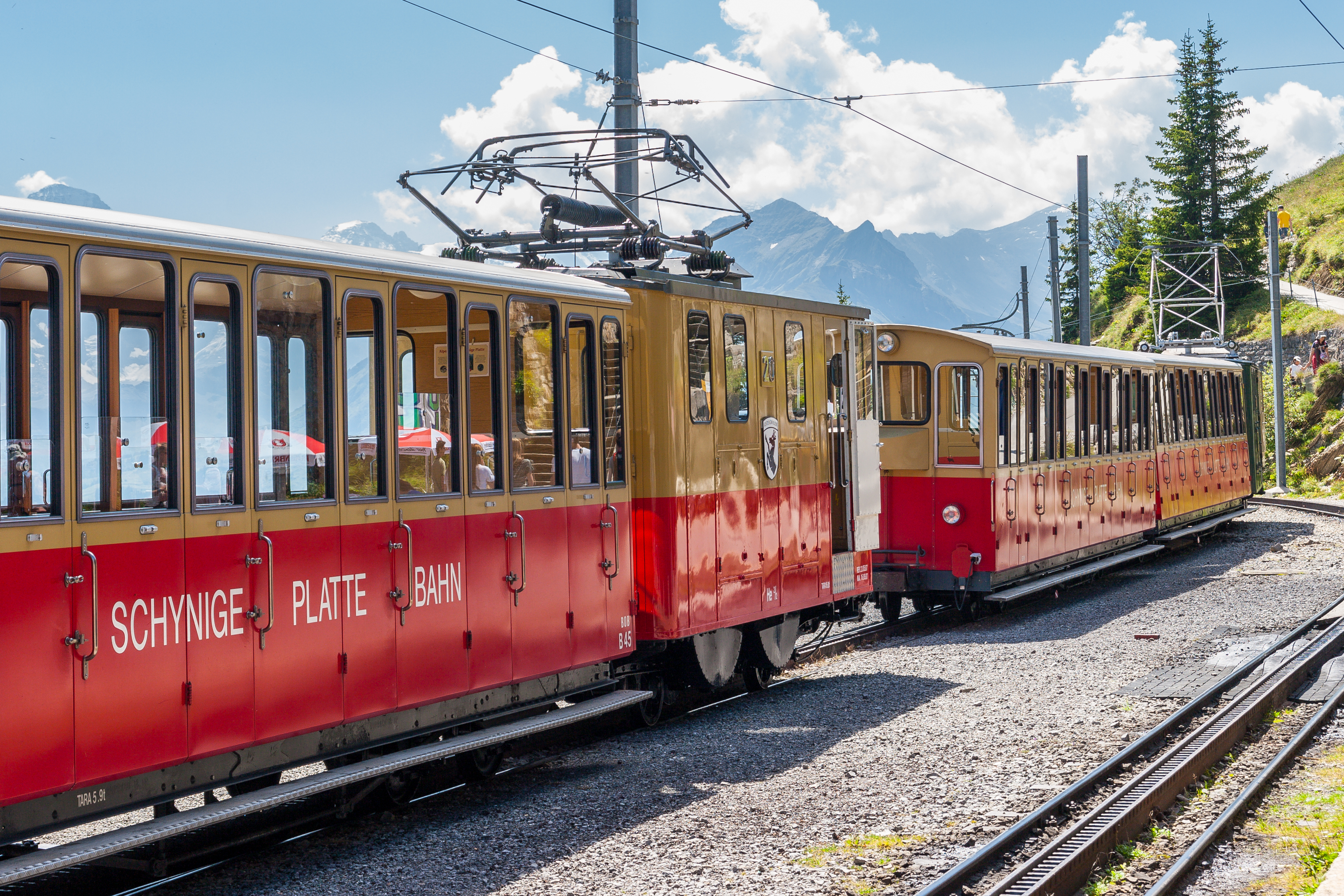
Modern steel coach with owner inscription BOB B 45

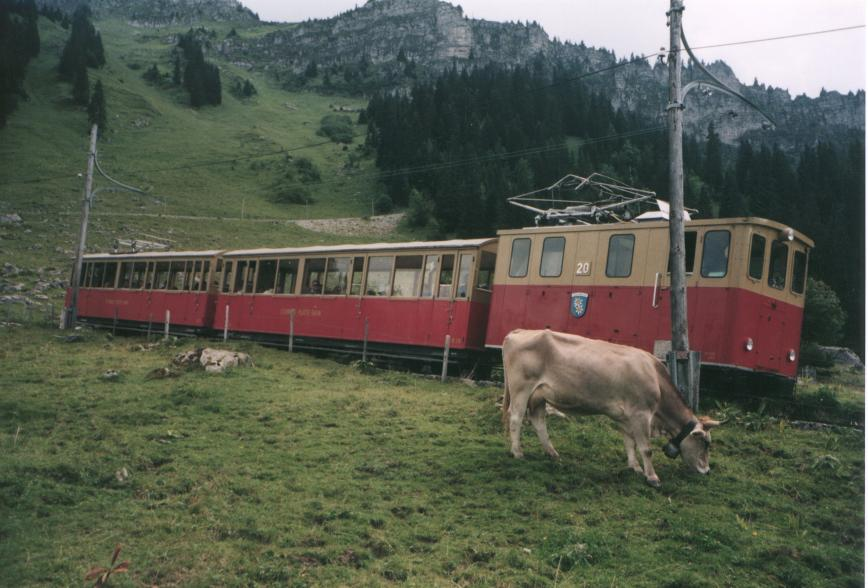
A descending Schynige Platte train

In 1992, the company started a rebuilding program for 12 coaches. On old underframes, brought to a unified length of 10.695 m (35.09 ft) over buffers, Ramseyer+Jenzer built a new steel body in the old compartment style. These coaches carry the numbers 41–52 (41–42 sit on the original underframes number 2 and 4, the others on underframes ex-WAB). Of the original stock numbers 6–8 (1894, 1924, 1929) with open compartments and 21–22 (1929, 1931) fully closed compartment coaches were kept and complemented with numbers 3 (open, 1893), 23 and 24 (closed, 1898, 1901) ex-WAB (last WAB numbers 3, 22, 24). This allows to build 10 consists of a locomotive with 2 coaches (see above, Operations). Original coaches 1 and 5 were scrapped in 1970 and 68, number 3 rebuilt as flat car (new number 91).

== See also ==
- List of mountain railways in Switzerland
- List of heritage railways and funiculars in Switzerland

== Bibliography ==
- Brawand Hansruedi, Schynige Platte-Bahn, Die Bergstrecke der Berner Oberland-Bahnen, Mit nostalgischem Cachet. Prellbock Verlag, Leissigen, 2003, ISBN 3-907579-26-7
- Book Tramways and Light Railways of Switzerland and Austria, ISBN 0-900433-96-5, by R.J.Buckley, published by the Light Rail Transit Association, 1984.
