= Wilderswil railway station =

Railway station in Switzerland

Wilderswil
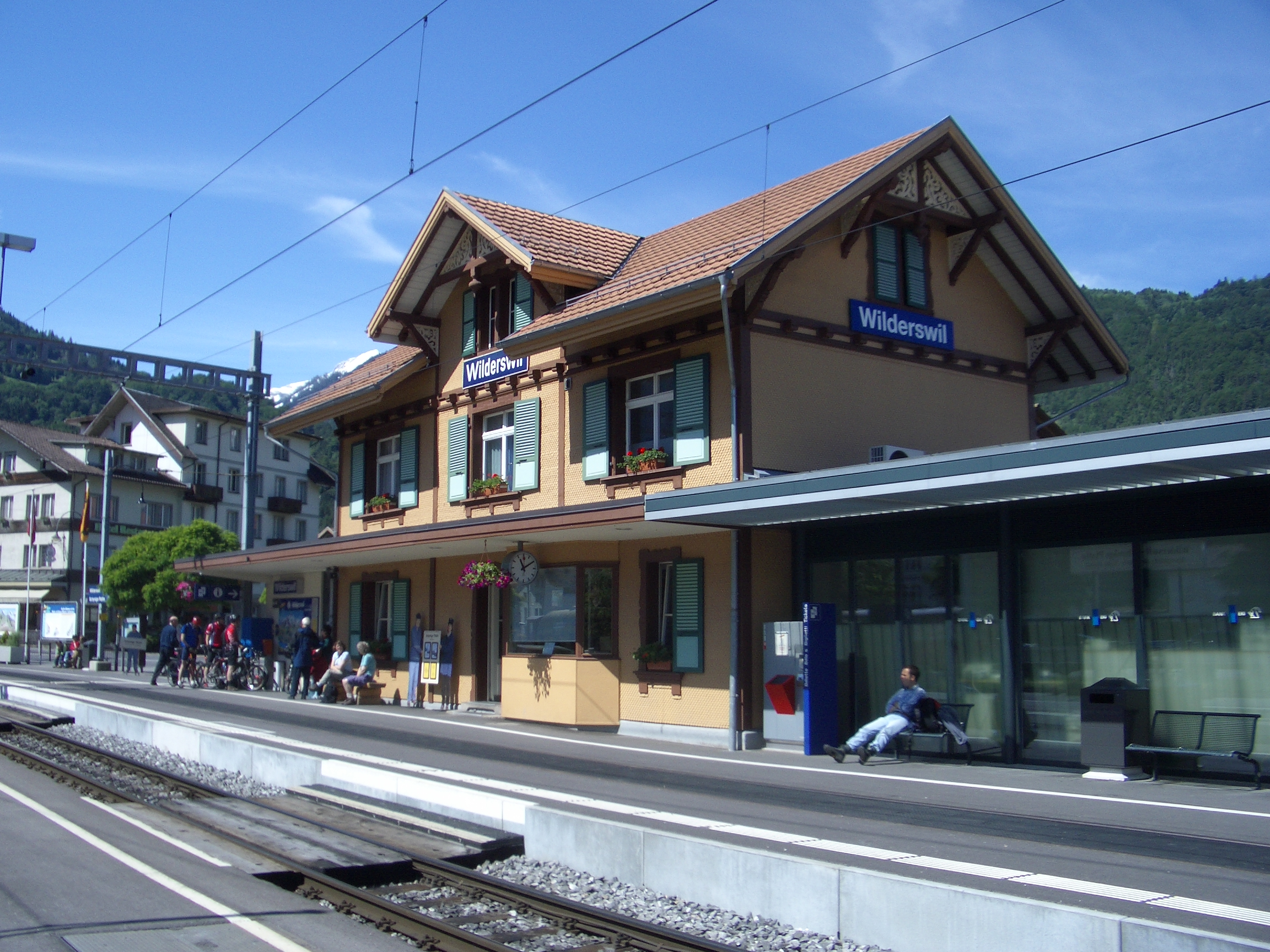
- The station building in 2007

General information
- Location: Bahnhofstrasse; Wilderswil, Bern; Switzerland
- Coordinates: 46°39′57″N 7°52′10″E
- Elevation: 584 m (1,916 ft)
- Owner: Berner Oberland-Bahnen
- Lines: Bernese Oberland line; Schynige Platte line
- Distance: 3.2 km (2.0 mi) from Interlaken Ost
- Platforms: 2
- Train operators: Berner Oberland-Bahnen
- Connections: PostAuto Schweiz bus lines

Other information
- Fare zone: 750 (Libero)

History
- Opened: 1 July 1890
- Electrified: 17 March 1914

Services
| Preceding station | Berner Oberland-Bahnen AG | Following station |
|---|---|---|
| Matten bei Interlaken towards Interlaken Ost | Bernese Oberland Railway | Zweilütschinen towards Lauterbrunnen or Grindelwald |
| Terminus | Schynige Platte Railway | Breitlauenen towards Schynige Platte |
Location

Wilderswil railway station (German: Bahnhof Wilderswil) is a railway station in the village and municipality of Wilderswil in the Swiss canton of Bern. The station is on the Berner Oberland Bahn, whose trains operate services to Interlaken Ost, Grindelwald and Lauterbrunnen. It is also the valley terminus of the Schynige Platte Railway, whose trains operate to the Schynige Platte and are stabled at a depot bordering the station.

The two lines use different gauges, and there is no physical connection between them. However the trains operate from adjacent platforms within the same station.

Trains in both directions on the Berner Oberland Bahn are scheduled to use Platform 2 alternately. There is a passing loop at the station, which, due to space constraints runs along the top of the platform with the rails embedded in the surface. This line is designated as Platform 1 but is not normally used by trains.

== Services ==
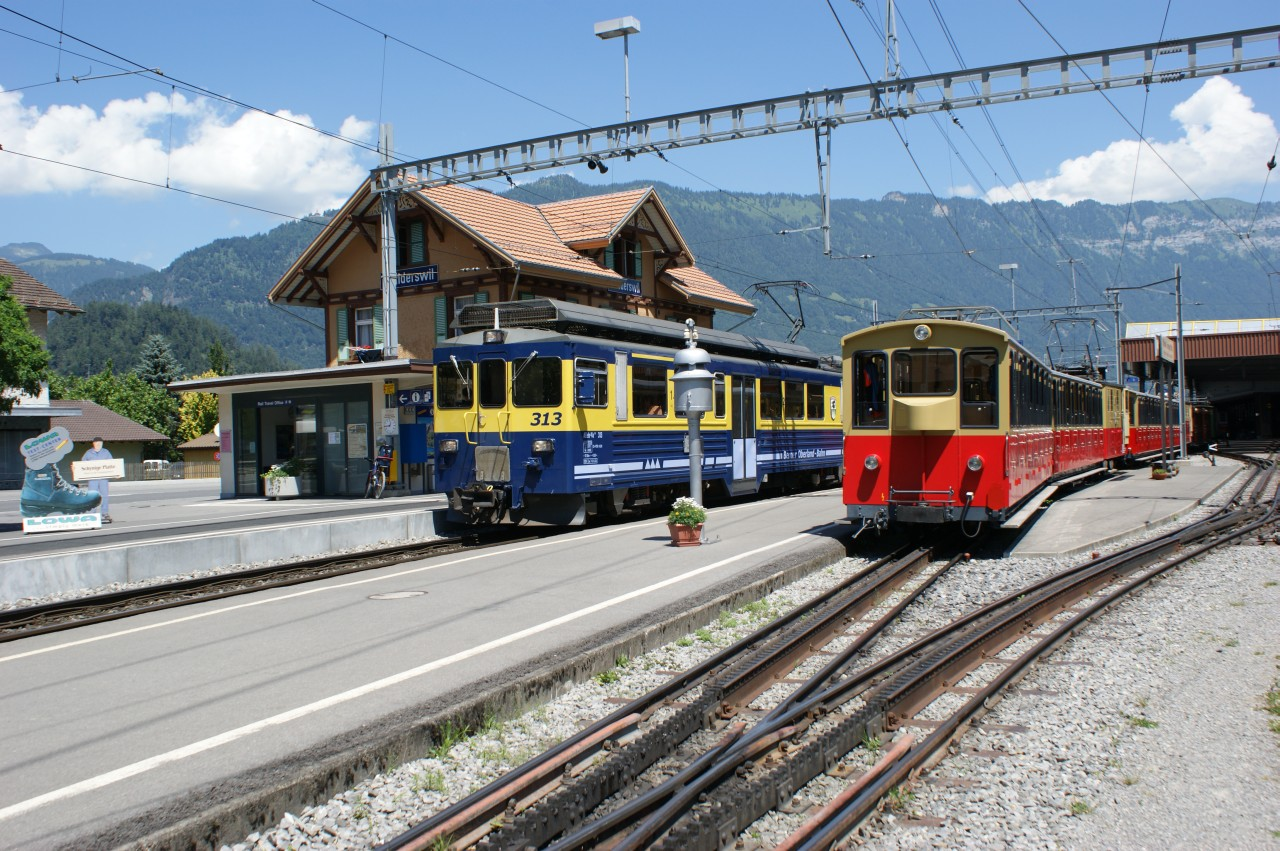
Trains of both lines in the station; Berner Oberland Bahn to the left; Schynige Platte Railway to the right. The passing loop on the Berner Oberland Bahn runs along the platform surface between the train and the station building.

As of the December 2020 timetable change, the following rail services stop at Wilderswil:

- Regio:
  - half-hourly service between Interlaken Ost and Lauterbrunnen or Grindelwald; trains operate combined between Interlaken Ost and Zweilütschinen.
  - fifteen trains per day to Schynige Platte; service operates in the summer only.

Post bus services connect Wilderswil station to other local places, including a half-hourly service to Interlaken West via Matten bei Interlaken.
