= Wilderswil =

- Municipality
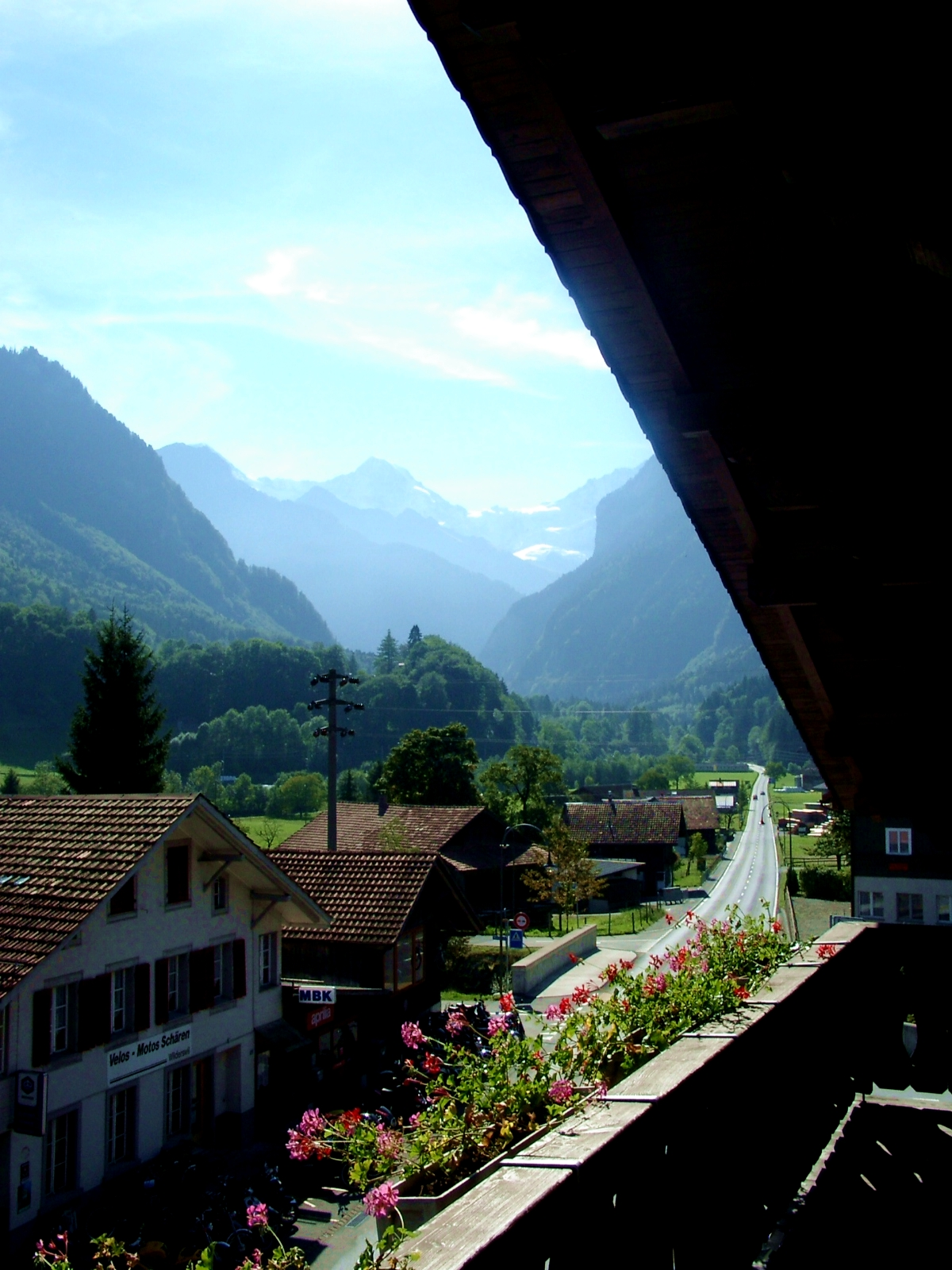
- The valley of the Lütschine river, seen from Wilderswil

- Flag Coat of arms
- Location of Wilderswil
- Location within Switzerland Location within Canton of Bern
- Coordinates: 46°40′N 7°52′E
- Country: Switzerland
- Canton: Bern
- District: Interlaken-Oberhasli

Government
  - Executive: Gemeinderat with 7 members
  - Mayor: Gemeindepräsident(in); Rolf Herren Ind. (as of 2026)

Area
  - Total: 13.5 km^{2} (5.2 sq mi)
- Elevation: 586 m (1,923 ft)

Population (December 2020)
  - Total: 2,638
  - Density: 195/km^{2} (506/sq mi)
- Time zone: UTC+01:00 (CET)
  - Summer (DST): UTC+02:00 (CEST)
- Postal code: 3812
- SFOS number: 594
- ISO 3166 code: CH-BE
- Surrounded by: Bönigen, Därligen, Gsteigwiler, Gündlischwand, Lauterbrunnen, Matten bei Interlaken, Saxeten
- Website: https://www.wilderswil.ch

Wilderswil is a village and a municipality in the Interlaken-Oberhasli administrative district in the canton of Bern in Switzerland.

Wilderswil belongs to the Small Agglomeration Interlaken with 23,300 inhabitants (2014).

== Geography ==
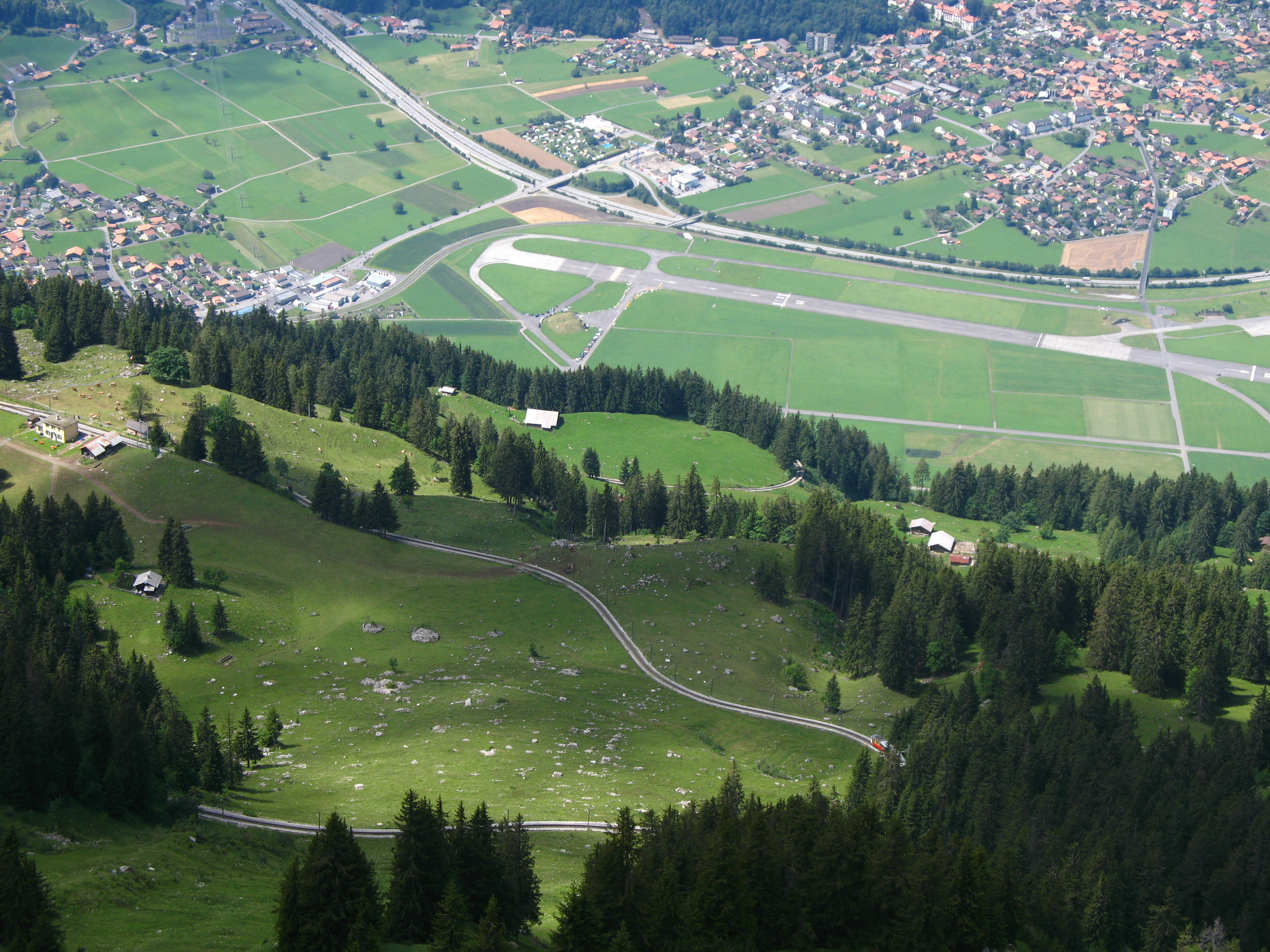
View from the Schynige Platte down toward Wilderswil

The village of Wilderswil is situated at the southern border of the Bödeli, the tongue of land between Lake Thun and Lake Brienz in the Bernese Oberland region. It lies at the entrance to the mountain valleys containing the Lütschine river and its tributary the Saxetenbach, and is some 4 km (2.5 mi) south of Interlaken, the main town of the Bödeli.

The municipality extends for some 8 km (5.0 mi) from the village, along the west bank of the Lütschine river, and includes the flanks of the mountains that border that valley to the west. Its altitude ranges from some 580 m (1,900 ft), on the Bödeli plain, to 2,413 m (7,917 ft), at the summit of Sulegg. It consists of the villages of Wilderswil, Mülenen and Gsteigallmend.

Wilderswil has an area of 13.19 km^{2} (5.09 sq mi). Of this area, 2.67 km^{2} (1.03 mi^{2}) or 19.7% is used for agricultural purposes, while 7.77 km^{2} (3.00 mi^{2}) or 57.4% is forested. Of the rest of the land, 1.35 km^{2} (0.52 mi^{2}) or 10.0% is settled (buildings or roads), 0.18 km^{2} (0.069 mi^{2}) or 1.3% is either rivers or lakes and 1.57 km^{2} (0.61 mi^{2}) or 11.6% is unproductive land.

Of the built up area, housing and buildings made up 3.8% and transportation infrastructure made up 4.4%. Out of the forested land, 53.8% of the total land area is heavily forested and 2.7% is covered with orchards or small clusters of trees. Of the agricultural land, 2.2% is used for growing crops and 7.7% is pastures and 9.5% is used for alpine pastures. All the water in the municipality is flowing water. Of the unproductive areas, 6.7% is unproductive vegetation and 4.9% is too rocky for vegetation.

On 31 December 2009, Amtsbezirk Interlaken, the municipality's former district, was dissolved. On the following day, 1 January 2010, it joined the newly created Verwaltungskreis Interlaken-Oberhasli.

== History ==
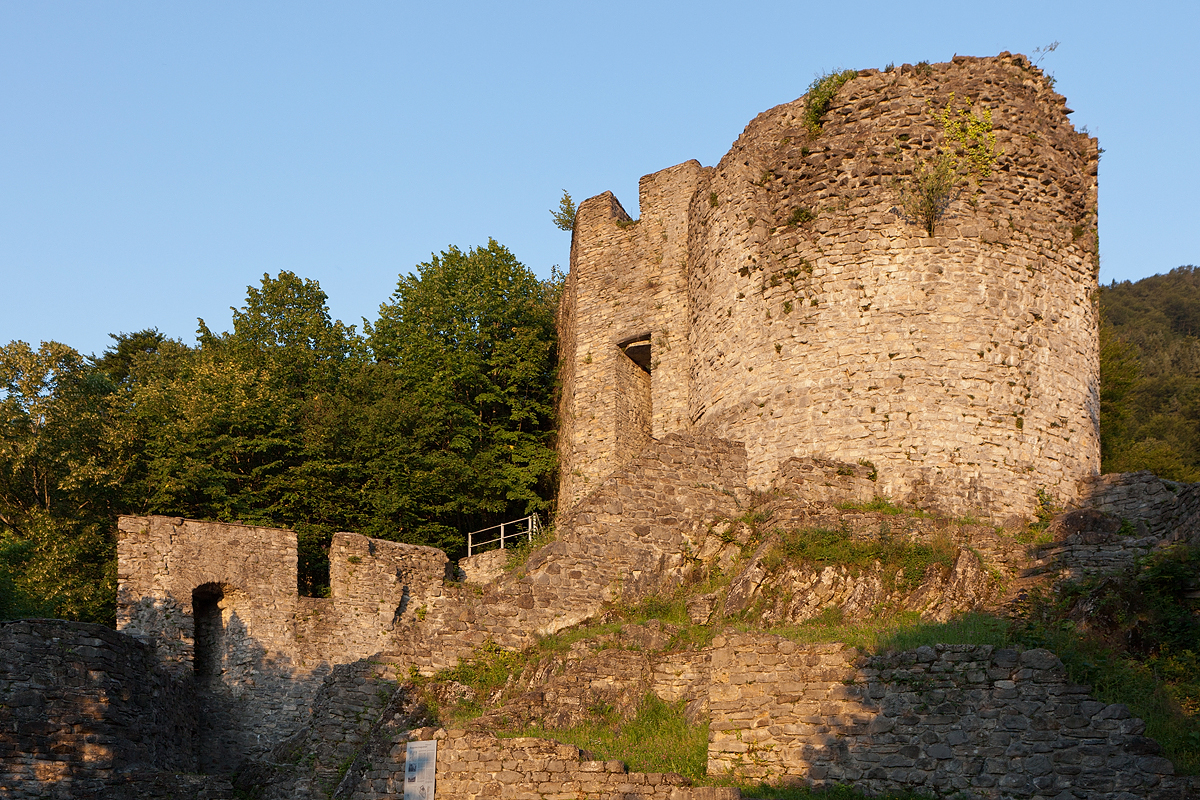
Ruins of Unspunnen Castle

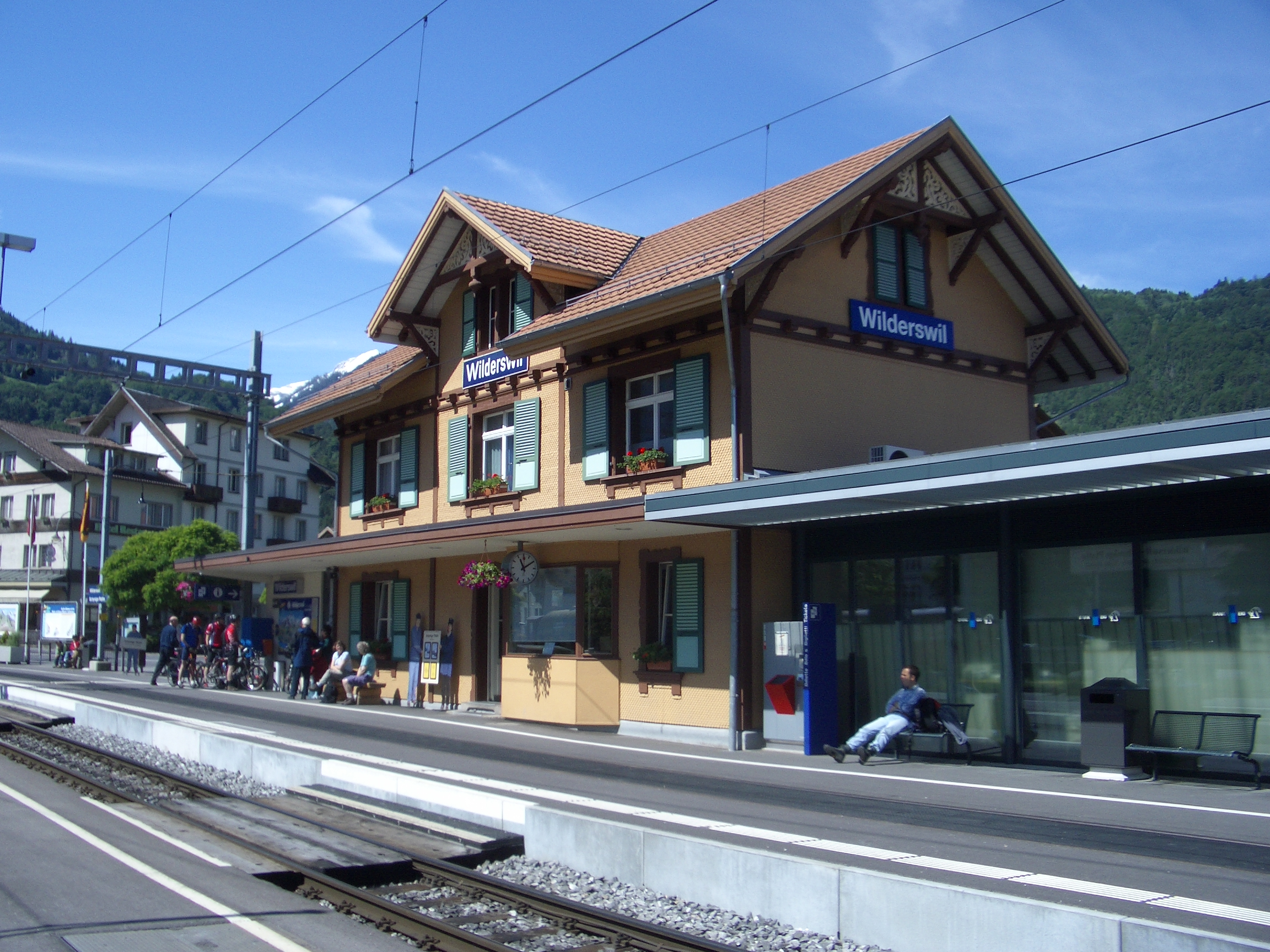
Wilderswil railway station

Aerial view (1952)

The area was settled by Alamanni around the year 600. The name also comes from this period. In 1895, in excavations for the construction of a hotel, a graveyard of 15 graves from the seventh century, with 18 skeletons and burial objects, was discovered.

Wilderswil is first mentioned in the year 1224 as Wilderswile. Unspunnen Castle, within the municipality, was first mentioned in 1232.

Wilderswil was governed by the barons of Rotenfluh-Wilderswil, later also by the barons of Waediswil, Weissenburg and Scharnachtal. During the Middle Ages, the villages of Mülenen and Grenchen (now part of the municipality) were part of the Herrschaft of Weissenau Castle. Around 1334, the Freiherr of Weissenau joined other local nobles in a war against the growing power of the city of Bern. After the defeat of the nobles, Weissenau was forced to sell the castle and his Herrschaft to Interlaken Monastery to pay his debts. In 1528, the city of Bern adopted the new faith of the Protestant Reformation and began imposing it on the Bernese Oberland. The monastery and its villages, including Mülenen and Grenchen, joined in an unsuccessful rebellion against the new faith. After Bern imposed its will on the Oberland, they secularized the monastery and annexed all the monastery lands. The two villages became a part of the Bernese bailiwick of Interlaken. During the 15th century, the alpine village of Gsteigallmend was built above the village of Grenchen. In the following century, Grenchen was gradually abandoned.

Wilderswil village was part of the Herrschaft of Unspunnen and had a history different from the other two villages. It remained under Unspunnen until the late 15th century. Between 1488 and 1515, the city of Bern gradually acquired rights and land in Unspunnen until they owned the entire Herrschaft. Under Bernese rule, Wilderswil was incorporated into the municipality of Unterseen, where it remained until 1798.

Since 1805, the Unspunnenfest, a festival that highlights traditional Swiss culture, has been held at regular intervals in the grounds of the now-ruined, Unspunnen Castle.

The tourism industry began in Wilderswil in the 19th century with the construction of a road from Interlaken to the Lütschine river valleys. The Bernese Oberland Railway built a station in the municipality in 1890, followed by the base station of a funicular railway to the Schynige Platte two years later. These easy transportation links encouraged the construction of hotels and resorts. By 1910, there were a dozen hotels in the municipality. The tourism industry suffered during the World Wars and the Great Depression, but in 1941 the Swiss Army built an airfield in Wilderswil. The airfield and the railroad became the largest employers in Wilderswil. The airfield closed in 2003 and, as of 2014, is used for racing and concerts.

== Coat of arms ==
The blazon of the municipal coat of arms is Per bend sinister Argent and Sable overall a Buck counterchanged.

== Demographics ==
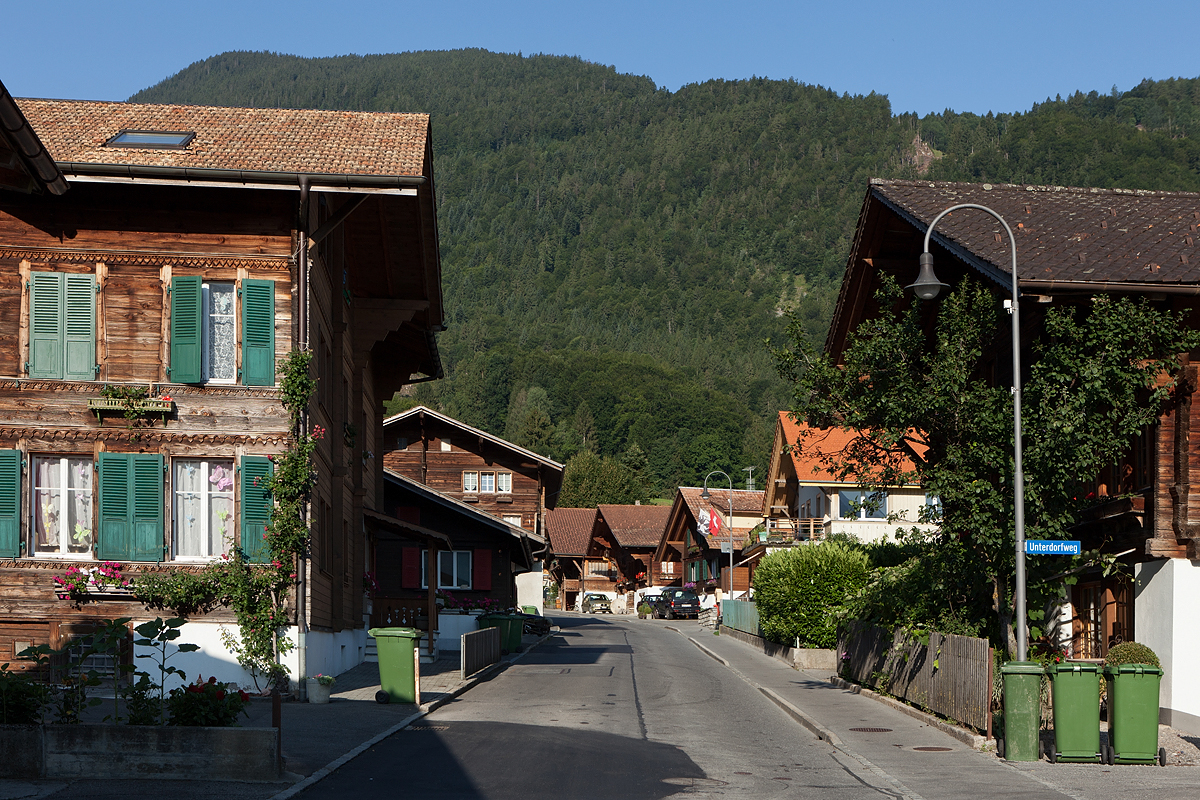
Kirchgasse in Wilderswil Oberdorf

Wilderswil has a population (as of December 2020) of 2,638. As of 2010, 10.0% of the population are resident foreign nationals. In the period from 2000 to 2010, the population changed at a rate of 12.7%. Migration accounted for 12%, while births and deaths accounted for −1%.

Most of the population (as of 2000) speaks German (2,116 or 94.5%) as their first language, Serbo-Croatian is the second most common (23 or 1.0%) and Italian is the third (20 or 0.9%). There are 19 people who speak French and one person who speaks Romansh.

As of 2008, the population was 49.8% male and 50.2% female. The population was made up of 1,108 Swiss men (44.3% of the population) and 137 (5.5%) non-Swiss men. There were 1,143 Swiss women (45.7%) and 113 (4.5%) non-Swiss women. Of the population in the municipality, 668 or about 29.8% were born in Wilderswil and lived there in 2000. There were 970 or 43.3% who were born in the same canton, while 298 or 13.3% were born somewhere else in Switzerland, and 234 or 10.5% were born outside of Switzerland.

As of 2010, children and teenagers (0–19 years old) made up 21% of the population, while adults (20–64 years old) made up 61.5%, and seniors (over 64 years old) made up 17.6%.

As of 2000, there were 927 people who were single and never married in the municipality. There were 1,094 married individuals, 125 widows or widowers and 92 individuals who were divorced.

As of 2000, there were 283 households that consist of only one person and 63 households with five or more people. In 2000, a total of 911 apartments (76.4% of the total) were permanently occupied, while 211 apartments (17.7%) were seasonally occupied and 71 apartments (6.0%) were empty. As of 2010, the construction rate of new housing units was 8.8 new units per 1,000 residents. The vacancy rate for the municipality, in 2011, was 0.95%.

The historical population is given in the following chart:

== Sights ==
The entire urbanized village of Wilderswil and the village of Gsteig bei Interlaken, which is shared with Gsteigwiler, are part of the Inventory of Swiss Heritage Sites.

== Politics ==
In the 2011 federal election, the most popular party was the Swiss People's Party (SVP) which received 36.1% of the vote. The next three most popular parties were the Conservative Democratic Party (BDP) (15.9%), the Social Democratic Party (SP) (14.5%) and the FDP.The Liberals (9.7%). In the federal election, a total of 868 votes were cast, and the voter turnout was 46.6%.

== Economy ==
As of 2011, Wilderswil had an unemployment rate of 1.57%. As of 2008, there were a total of 989 people employed in the municipality. Of these, there were 43 people employed in the primary economic sector and about 20 businesses involved in this sector. 380 people were employed in the secondary sector and there were 25 businesses in this sector. 566 people were employed in the tertiary sector, with 77 businesses in this sector. There were 1,167 residents of the municipality who were employed in some capacity, of which females made up 43.7% of the workforce.

In 2008 there were a total of 843 full-time equivalent jobs. The number of jobs in the primary sector was 27, of which 26 were in agriculture and one was in forestry or lumber production. The number of jobs in the secondary sector was 364 of which 288 or (79.1%) were in manufacturing and 76 (20.9%) were in construction. The number of jobs in the tertiary sector was 452. In the tertiary sector, 167 or 36.9% were in wholesale or retail sales or the repair of motor vehicles, 30 or 6.6% were in the movement and storage of goods, 156 or 34.5% were in a hotel or restaurant, nine or 2.0% were technical professionals or scientists, 30 or 6.6% were in education and 26 or 5.8% were in health care.

In 2000, there were 300 workers who commuted into the municipality and 811 workers who commuted away. The municipality was a net exporter of workers, with about 2.7 workers leaving the municipality for every one entering. Of the working population, 16.9% used public transportation to get to work, and 46.4% used a private car.

== Religion ==
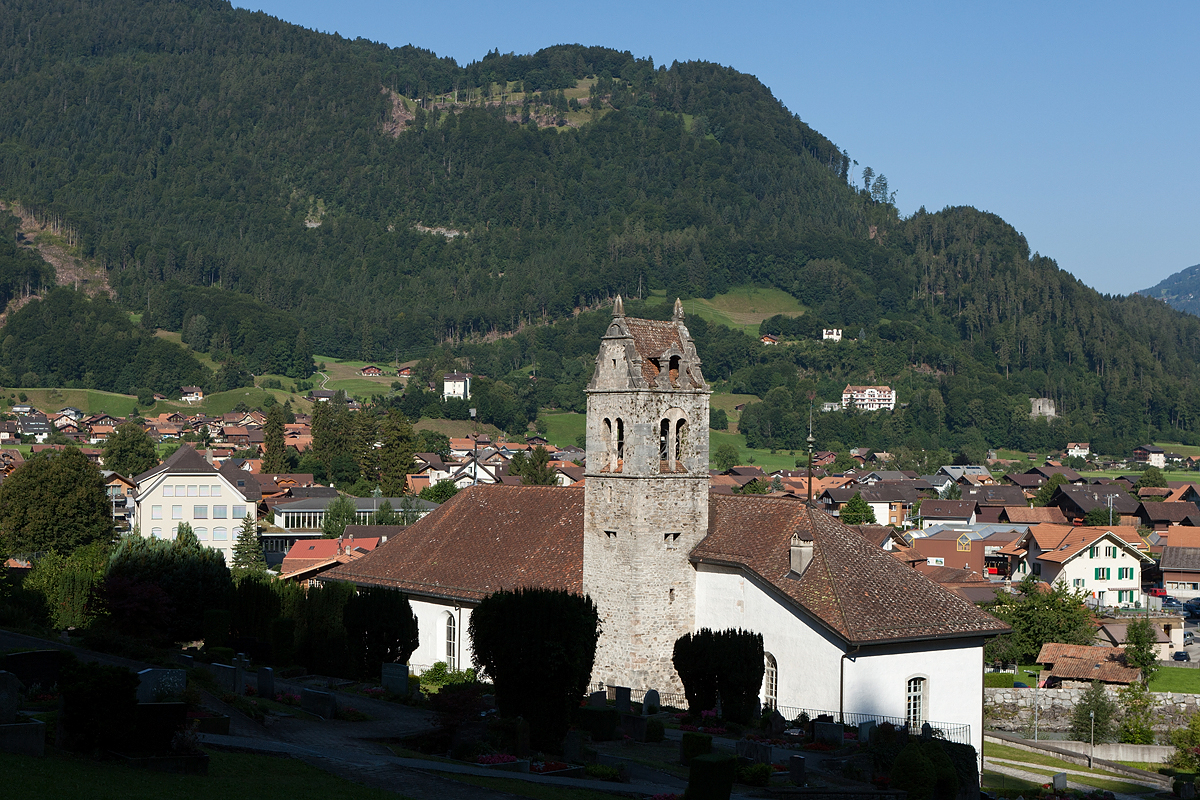
Gsteig parish church with Wilderswil in the background

All three villages that make up Wilderwil belong to the large parish of Gsteigwiler.

From the 2000 census, 267 or 11.9% were Roman Catholic, while 1,642 or 73.4% belonged to the Swiss Reformed Church. Of the rest of the population, there were 13 members of an Orthodox church (or about 0.58% of the population), there were two individuals (or about 0.09% of the population) who belonged to the Christian Catholic Church, and there were 119 individuals (or about 5.32% of the population) who belonged to another Christian church. There were 38 (or about 1.70% of the population) who were Muslims. There were three individuals who were Buddhist, six individuals who were Hindu and six individuals who belonged to another church. 148 (or about 6.61% of the population) belonged to no church, are agnostic or atheist, and 53 individuals (or about 2.37% of the population) did not answer the question.

== Education ==
In Wilderswil, about 998 or (44.6%) of the population have completed non-mandatory upper secondary education, and 200 or (8.9%) have completed additional higher education (either university or a Fachhochschule). Of the 200 who had completed tertiary schooling, 69.5% were Swiss men, 22.5% were Swiss women, 5.5% were non-Swiss men and 2.5% were non-Swiss women.

The canton of Bern school system provides one year of non-obligatory Kindergarten, followed by six years of primary school. This is followed by three years of obligatory lower secondary school where the students are separated according to ability and aptitude. Following the lower secondary, students may attend additional schooling, or they may enter an apprenticeship.

During the 2010−11 school year, there were a total of 322 students attending classes in Wilderswil. There were two kindergarten classes with a total of 26 students in the municipality. Of the kindergarten students, 3.8% were permanent or temporary residents of Switzerland (not citizens) and 11.5% had a mother language different from the classroom language. The municipality had nine primary classes and 183 students. Of the primary students, 5.5% were permanent or temporary residents of Switzerland (not citizens) and 5.5% had a mother language different from the classroom language. During the same year, there were five lower secondary classes with a total of 97 students. There were 2.1% who were permanent or temporary residents of Switzerland (not citizens) and 4.1% had a mother language different from the classroom language. The remainder of the students attended a private or special school.

As of 2000, there were 113 students in Wilderswil who came from another municipality, while 69 residents attended schools outside the municipality.

== Transportation ==
Wilderswil railway station is the primary connection in the town, Wilderswil with Berner Oberland Bahn trains passing through between Interlaken and up to Lauterbrunnen and Grindelwald. The station is the terminus of the Schynige Platte Railway.

The town has main road access to the A8 motorway. In August 2023, a project was completed to construct a new 2km bypass to reduce traffic in Wilderswil. The new road system included links to the airfield, along with a tunnel which can be utilised as a drainage corridor in the event of severe flooding of the Lütschine River. The construction cost at 70million CHF.

== Tourism ==
Because of its location, it is the point of departure for many excursions to the heart of the Jungfrau region. The town has 16 hotels, motels and hotels with 900 guest beds, 300 vacation homes, and one camping site (open in the summer).

== Famous people ==
- Urs Räber, skier
- Eugenie Schumann, pianist and daughter of the composer Robert Schumann and the great pianist Clara Wieck Schumann
