= Daniel Hösli =

- Born: 3 December 1957 (age 68); Switzerland
- Military career
- Allegiance: Switzerland
- Branch: Swiss Air Force
- Service years: 1980–2015
- Rank: Lieutenant colonel German: Oberstleutnant NATO-Code: OF-4.
- Nicknames: Dani, Tiger Zero
- Commands: Commander of the Patrouille Suisse

Daniel "Dani" Hösli is a former Swiss Air Force pilot. He was a professional officer who gained the rank of lieutenant colonel.

== Career ==
In 1980, Daniel Hösli entered training as a military pilot and subsequently became a de Havilland Vampire pilot. In 1983 he transitioned to the Fliegerstaffel 1 (fighter squadron 1) at Dübendorf Air Base and became an F-5 Tiger pilot. From 1987 to 1998, Hösli was a member of the Patrouille Suisse. In 1997 he transitioned to flying the F/A-18 Hornet.

From 2001 to mid-2015, he was commander of the Patrouille Suisse, carried the radio call sign 'Tiger Zero', and coordinated the flight program of the Patrouille Suisse from the ground. Hösli served as the shooting controller for aviator shooting at Axalp, known as 'Fliegerdemonstration Axalp', and as the Swiss Air Force fleet chief for the F-5 Tiger fleet.

In 2015, he was succeeded by Nils Hämmerli as Commander of the Patrouille Suisse, prior to his retirement.

== Life ==
Daniel Hösli grew up in Bad Ragaz before attending middle school in Zürich. At age 17, Hösli earned a glider pilot license. Daniel Hösli is married and has three sons.

== Aircraft endorsements ==
- Hösli trained as a combat pilot on Pilatus P-3 and de Havilland Vampire, and as a professional pilot flew the Swiss Air Force Pilatus PC-6 Porter, Pilatus PC-7, F-5E, F-5F, F/A-18C and F/A-18D.

== Bibliography ==
- Swissness 50 years Patrouille Suisse & 25 years PC-7 TEAM ISBN 978-3-906562-43-8
- Aridio Pellanda: Ueberwachungsgeschwader 30 Jahre Patrouille Suisse Max Huber, Kerzers ISBN 3906401219
- "Patrouille Suisse Backstage" ISBN 978-3-909111-76-3
- Patrouille Suisse Booklet 2014
- Patrouille Suisse Booklet 2015
- Air14 Booklet Historie Hommage Innovation
- Schweizer Luftwaffe Jahrespublikation 2012
- Schweizer Luftwaffe Jahrespublikation 2015
- Insider PS Fanclub 2014
- Armee.ch 2/2014
