= Axalphorn =

Mountain in Switzerland

Coordinates: 46.710333°N 8.060817°E

1929 aerial photograph of Axalphorn, Oltschiburg and Schwarzhorn.

Axalphorn (locally, Axalphoren) is a peak of the Bernese Oberland, at an altitude of 2321 m. The summit is on the municipal border between Brienz and Brienzwiler. The Axalp ski resort is on the northern slope of Axalphorn. On the Axalphorn ridge, west of the summit, is the Axalp-Ebenfluh installation of the Swiss Air Force. Installed in 1942, it is the site of the yearly live fire demonstration.

== See also ==
- Axalp
- Fliegerschiessen Axalp
- Wildgärst
