= Oltschiburg =

Mountain in Switzerland

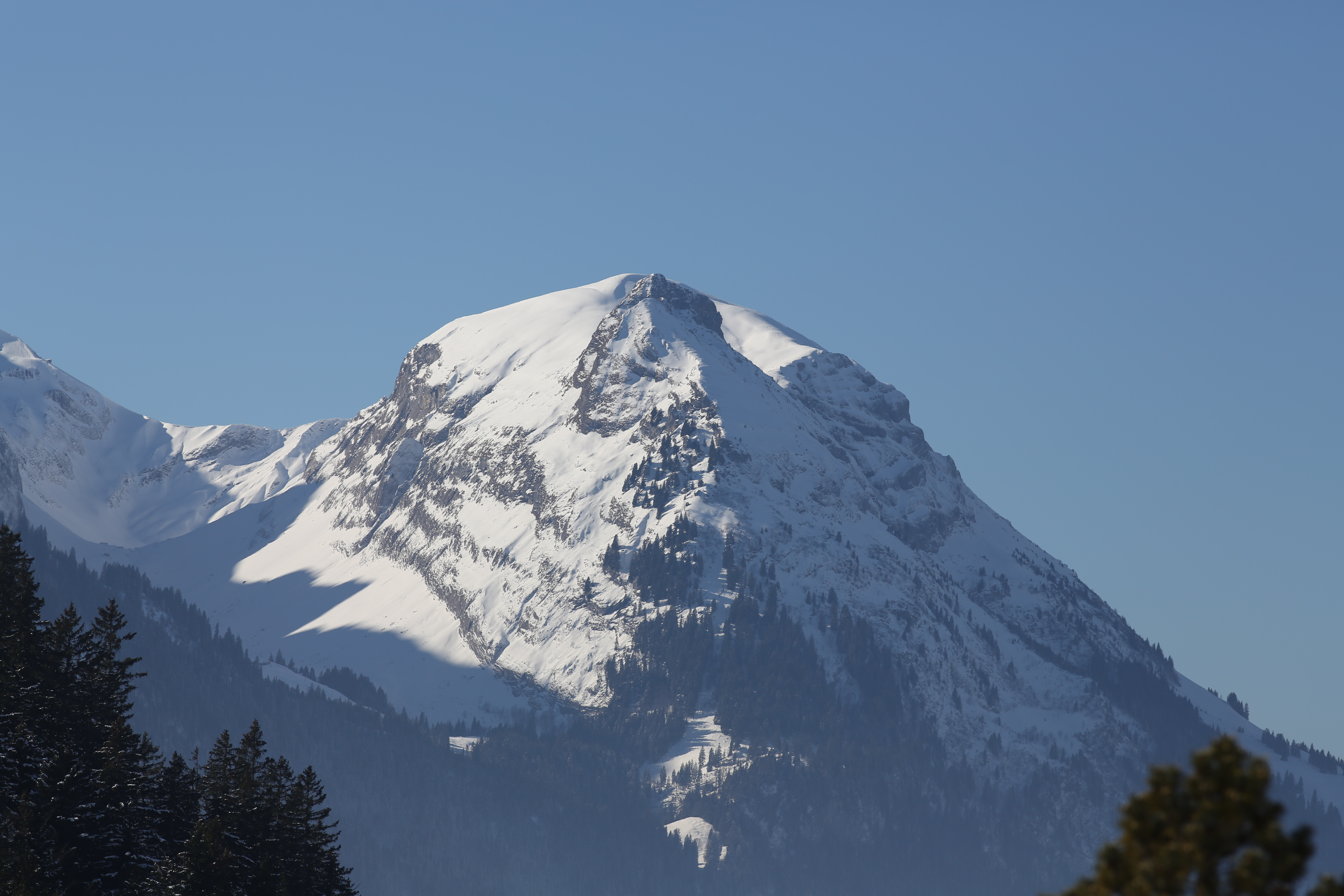

Highest point
- Elevation: 2,234 m (7,329 ft)
- Prominence: 291 m (955 ft)
- Coordinates: 46°42′58.3″N 8°4′44.7″E

Geography
- Location within Switzerland
- Location: Bern, Switzerland
- Parent range: Bernese Alps

The Oltschiburg is a mountain of the Bernese Alps Switzerland, overlooking Lake Brienz in the Bernese Oberland. It lies on the chain that lies north of the Grosse Scheidegg and that culminates at the Schwarzhorn. The closest locality is Axalp. The elevation of oltschiburg is at 2237 meters (7,329 feet) with a Prominence of 1010 feet.
