= Bönigen =

- Municipality
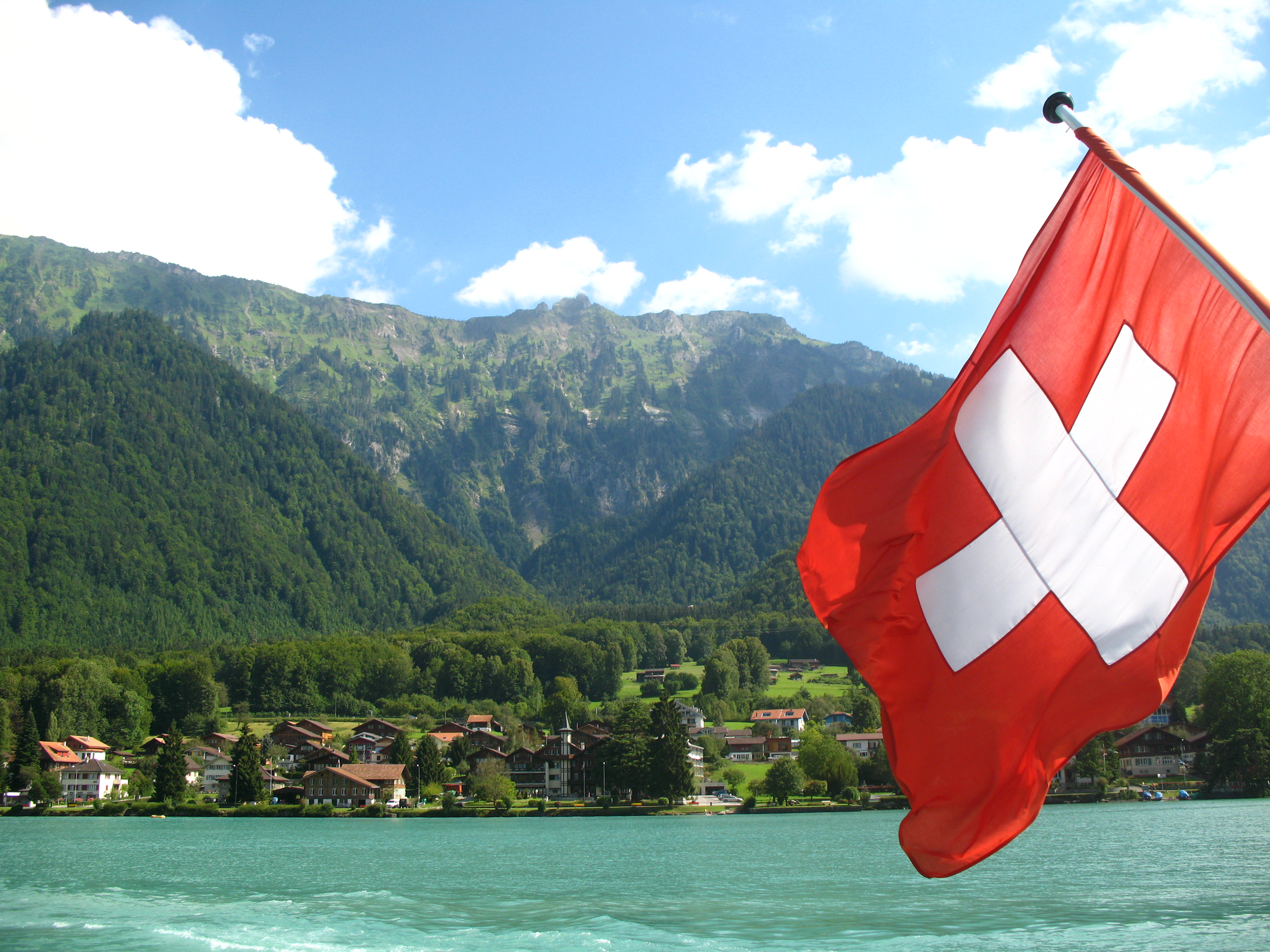
- Bönigen from Lake Brienz

- Flag Coat of arms
- Location of Bönigen
- Location within Switzerland Location within Canton of Bern
- Coordinates: 46°41′N 7°53′E
- Country: Switzerland
- Canton: Bern
- District: Interlaken-Oberhasli

Government
  - Executive: Gemeinderat with 7 members
  - Mayor: Gemeindepräsident(in); Michel Ueli (as of 2026)

Area
  - Total: 15.1 km^{2} (5.8 sq mi)
- Elevation: 568 m (1,864 ft)

Population (December 2020)
  - Total: 2,569
  - Density: 170/km^{2} (441/sq mi)
- Time zone: UTC+01:00 (CET)
  - Summer (DST): UTC+02:00 (CEST)
- Postal code: 3806
- SFOS number: 572
- ISO 3166 code: CH-BE
- Surrounded by: Iseltwald, Gündlischwand, Gsteigwiler, Matten bei Interlaken, Wilderswil, Interlaken
- Website: www.boenigen.ch

Bönigen (German pronunciation: [ˈbøːnɪɡn̩]) is a village and municipality in the Interlaken-Oberhasli administrative district in the Swiss canton of Bern. It lies on the shore of Lake Brienz, near to the mouth of the river Lütschine, and adjacent to the resort town of Interlaken.

Bönigen belongs to the Small Agglomeration Interlaken with 23,300 inhabitants (2014).

Bönigen belongs to the church parish of Gsteig bei Interlaken, which includes eight other nearby municipalities.

== History ==
Aerial view by Walter Mittelholzer (1925)

Bönigen is first mentioned in 1261 as villa Boningen. The name Bönigen ("of the people of the Bono clan") is composed of the Old High German personal name Bono and the toponymic suffix -ingun.

The village was first mentioned in 1261 then the Freiherr of Eschenbach gave part of the village to Interlaken Monastery. He gave the monastery additional lands in the village in 1275., the 1261 and 1275 it gave with Iselten and Künzlenalp the Interlaken monastery. Throughout its history, Bönigen was often at the center of unsuccessful conflicts in the Bernese Oberland. In 1330, the Oberhasli valley rebelled against their overlord in what came to be known as the Weissenburger War. The Oberhasli army was destroyed outside Bönigen. About two decades later, in 1349, Bönigen joined an unsuccessful rebellion against the growing power of Interlaken Monastery. In 1528, Bern adopted the Protestant Reformation and ordered all the surrounding districts to convert to the new faith. Bönigen joined the unsuccessful Oberland resistance to this conversion. Once Bern had enforced its will on the Oberland, they secularized Interlaken Monastery and annexed all the monastery's land. Bönigen became part of the Bernese bailiwick of Interlaken. Following the 1798 French invasion, Bönigen became part of the Helvetic Republic Canton of Oberland. The new Canton only lasted a few years and was reintegrated into the Canton of Bern with the Act of Mediation in 1803. In 1814 and again in 1836, Bönigen led attempts to recreate the Canton of Oberland.

The village was originally perched on a hill above the flood level of the lake and local streams. In the 19th century, the river course was corrected and flood control measures put in place. Around 1860, these projects stabilized the lake shore and lowered the water level. These improvements allowed the village to spread down toward the streams and the lake.

In 1874, Bönigen was reached by the Bödelibahn railway from Därligen, on Lake Thun, via Interlaken. Until 1893, this line was unconnected to the rest of the Swiss railway system, and served as a link between the steamships on both lakes. Bönigen remained the eastern terminus of the line, which eventually became part of the Bern–Lötschberg–Simplon railway (BLS), until 1969, when passenger service was cut back to Interlaken Ost station. However the BLS had built its main workshops alongside the line at Bönigen's western edge, and these remain open, along with the track between Interlaken and the workshops. The rest of line was removed, although the site of the lakeside terminus can still be identified.

== Geography ==
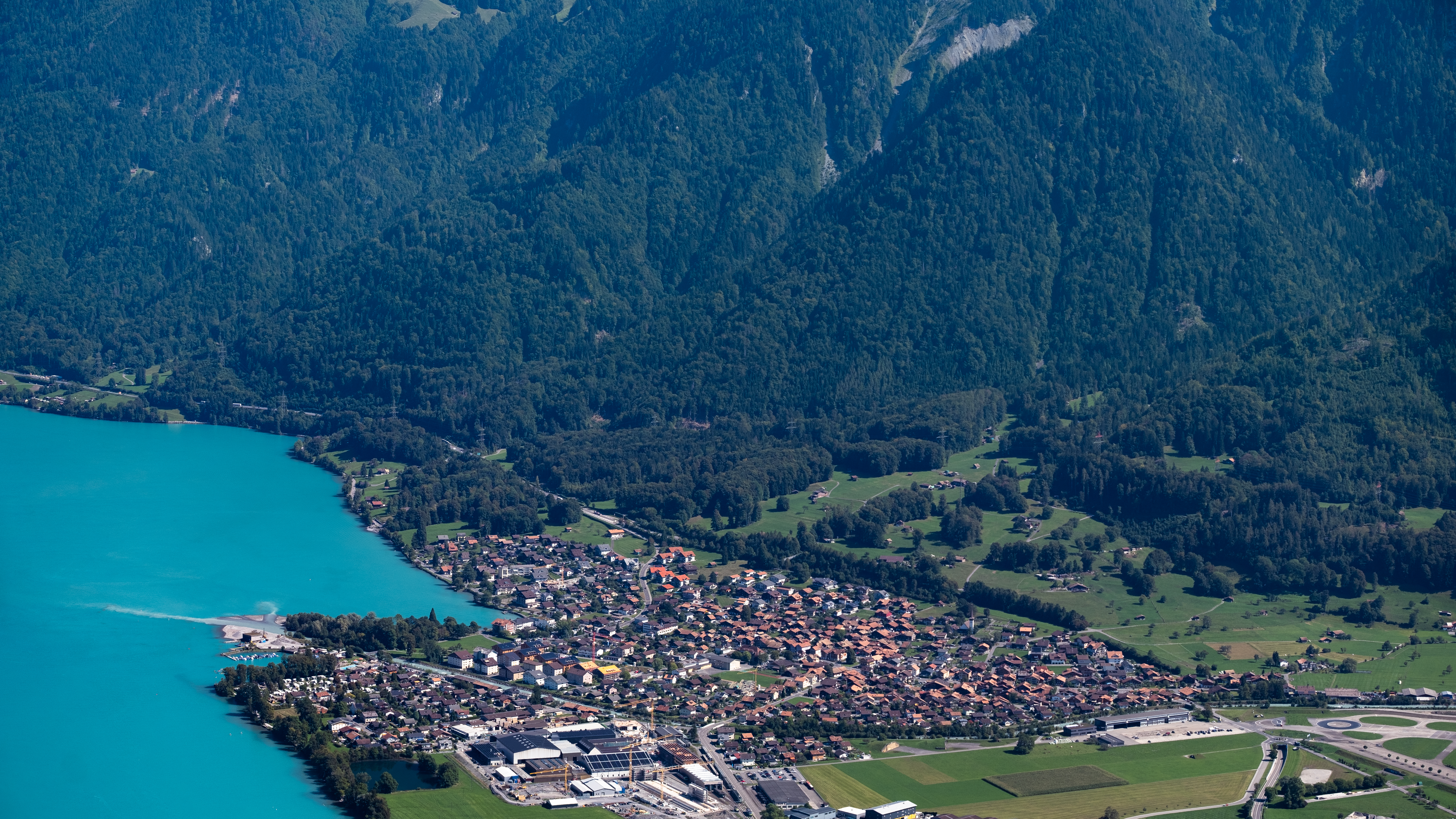
Bönigen from Harderkulm

Bönigen lies in the Bernese Oberland on the south-west side of Lake Brienz, near to the point where the Lütschine flows into the lake. The village centre lies in the northwest part of the municipality along the Lütschine and up to the lake. The village has grown towards the nearby resort town of Interlaken, and the built-up areas are nearly contiguous. The majority of the municipal area is located on the steep mountainsides, where such peaks as the Loucherhorn (2,230 m (7,320 ft)), the Roteflue (2,296 m (7,533 ft)) and the Schynige Platte are found.

Bönigen has an area of 15.1 km^{2} (5.83 sq mi). Of this area, 2.48 km^{2} (0.96 mi^{2}) or 16.4% is used for agricultural purposes, while 8.66 km^{2} (3.34 mi^{2}) or 57.3% is forested. Of the rest of the land, 0.93 km^{2} (0.36 mi^{2}) or 6.2% is settled (buildings or roads), 0.17 km^{2} (0.066 mi^{2}) or 1.1% is either rivers or lakes and 2.83 km^{2} (1.09 mi^{2}) or 18.7% is unproductive land.

Of the built up area, housing and buildings made up 3.2% and transportation infrastructure made up 1.9%. Out of the forested land, 49.7% of the total land area is heavily forested and 3.9% is covered with orchards or small clusters of trees. Of the agricultural land, 1.0% is used for growing crops and 6.5% is pastures and 8.7% is used for alpine pastures. Of the water in the municipality, 0.4% is in lakes and 0.7% is in rivers and streams. Of the unproductive areas, 10.8% is unproductive vegetation and 7.9% is too rocky for vegetation.

On 31 December 2009 Amtsbezirk Interlaken, the municipality's former district, was dissolved. On the following day, 1 January 2010, it joined the newly created Verwaltungskreis Interlaken-Oberhasli.

== Coat of arms ==
The blazon of the municipal coat of arms is Per fess Or an Eagle displayed Sable crowned Or and Argent a Semi Ibex rampant couped Sable langued Gules.

== Demographics ==
Bönigen has a population (as of December 2020) of 2,569. As of 2010, 6.2% of the population are resident foreign nationals. Over the last 10 years (2000-2010) the population has changed at a rate of 10.2%. Migration accounted for 13.6%, while births and deaths accounted for -2.8%.

Most of the population (as of 2000) speaks German (2,086 or 95.6%) as their first language, English is the second most common (17 or 0.8%) and Italian is the third (16 or 0.7%). There are 14 people who speak French and 1 person who speaks Romansh.

As of 2008, the population was 49.3% male and 50.7% female. The population was made up of 1,126 Swiss men (46.1% of the population) and 78 (3.2%) non-Swiss men. There were 1,166 Swiss women (47.7%) and 74 (3.0%) non-Swiss women. Of the population in the municipality, 735 or about 33.7% were born in Bönigen and lived there in 2000. There were 918 or 42.1% who were born in the same canton, while 275 or 12.6% were born somewhere else in Switzerland, and 183 or 8.4% were born outside of Switzerland.

As of 2010, children and teenagers (0–19 years old) make up 21.2% of the population, while adults (20–64 years old) make up 61.3% and seniors (over 64 years old) make up 17.5%.

As of 2000, there were 840 people who were single and never married in the municipality. There were 1,120 married individuals, 125 widows or widowers and 97 individuals who are divorced.

As of 2000, there were 281 households that consist of only one person and 59 households with five or more people. In 2000, a total of 893 apartments (84.4% of the total) were permanently occupied, while 133 apartments (12.6%) were seasonally occupied and 32 apartments (3.0%) were empty. As of 2010, the construction rate of new housing units was 1.2 new units per 1000 residents. The vacancy rate for the municipality, in 2011, was 0.64%.

The historical population is given in the following chart:

== Sights ==
The entire village of Bönigen is designated as part of the Inventory of Swiss Heritage Sites.

== Politics ==
In the 2011 federal election the most popular party was the Swiss People's Party (SVP) which received 32.3% of the vote. The next three most popular parties were the Social Democratic Party (SP) (21%), the Conservative Democratic Party (BDP) (17.5%) and the FDP.The Liberals (7.7%). In the federal election, a total of 865 votes were cast, and the voter turnout was 46.1%.

== Economy ==
As of 2011, Bönigen had an unemployment rate of 1.45%. As of 2008, there were a total of 682 people employed in the municipality. Of these, there were 43 people employed in the primary economic sector and about 17 businesses involved in this sector. 350 people were employed in the secondary sector and there were 34 businesses in this sector. 289 people were employed in the tertiary sector, with 49 businesses in this sector. There were 1,074 residents of the municipality who were employed in some capacity, of which females made up 41.2% of the workforce.

In 2008 there were a total of 580 full-time equivalent jobs. The number of jobs in the primary sector was 18, of which 15 were in agriculture and 3 were in forestry or lumber production. The number of jobs in the secondary sector was 336 of which 180 or (53.6%) were in manufacturing, 3 or (0.9%) were in mining and 152 (45.2%) were in construction. The number of jobs in the tertiary sector was 226. In the tertiary sector; 45 or 19.9% were in wholesale or retail sales or the repair of motor vehicles, 4 or 1.8% were in the movement and storage of goods, 75 or 33.2% were in a hotel or restaurant, 6 or 2.7% were the insurance or financial industry, 13 or 5.8% were technical professionals or scientists, 19 or 8.4% were in education and 26 or 11.5% were in health care.

In 2000, there were 304 workers who commuted into the municipality and 741 workers who commuted away. The municipality is a net exporter of workers, with about 2.4 workers leaving the municipality for every one entering. Of the working population, 13.8% used public transportation to get to work, and 47.1% used a private car.

== Religion ==
From the 2000 census, 253 or 11.6% were Roman Catholic, while 1,639 or 75.1% belonged to the Swiss Reformed Church. Of the rest of the population, there were 9 members of an Orthodox church (or about 0.41% of the population), there was 1 individual who belongs to the Christian Catholic Church, and there were 149 individuals (or about 6.83% of the population) who belonged to another Christian church. There were 3 individuals (or about 0.14% of the population) who were Jewish, and 30 (or about 1.37% of the population) who were Islamic. There was 1 person who was Buddhist, 7 individuals who were Hindu and 1 individual who belonged to another church. 101 (or about 4.63% of the population) belonged to no church, are agnostic or atheist, and 61 individuals (or about 2.80% of the population) did not answer the question.

== Education ==
In Bönigen about 1,008 or (46.2%) of the population have completed non-mandatory upper secondary education, and 184 or (8.4%) have completed additional higher education (either university or a Fachhochschule). Of the 184 who completed tertiary schooling, 75.0% were Swiss men, 19.6% were Swiss women, 3.8% were non-Swiss men.

The Canton of Bern school system provides one year of non-obligatory Kindergarten, followed by six years of Primary school. This is followed by three years of obligatory lower Secondary school where the students are separated according to ability and aptitude. Following the lower Secondary students may attend additional schooling or they may enter an apprenticeship.

During the 2010-11 school year, there were a total of 218 students attending classes in Bönigen. There were 2 kindergarten classes with a total of 43 students in the municipality. Of the kindergarten students, 7.0% were permanent or temporary residents of Switzerland (not citizens) and 7.0% have a different mother language than the classroom language. The municipality had 7 primary classes and 145 students. Of the primary students, 4.1% were permanent or temporary residents of Switzerland (not citizens) and 2.1% have a different mother language than the classroom language. During the same year, there were 2 lower secondary classes with a total of 30 students. and 3.3% have a different mother language than the classroom language.

As of 2000, there was one student in Bönigen who came from another municipality, while 84 residents attended schools outside the municipality.

Bönigen is home to the Schul- und Gemeindebibliothek Bönigen (municipal library of Bönigen). The library has (as of 2008) 6,799 books or other media, and loaned out 14,581 items in the same year. It was open a total of 300 days with average of 8 hours per week during that year.

== Literature ==
- Paul Michel: Bönigen. Bönigen, 1989, ISBN 3-905454-01-7
