= Gumihorn =

Mountain in Switzerland

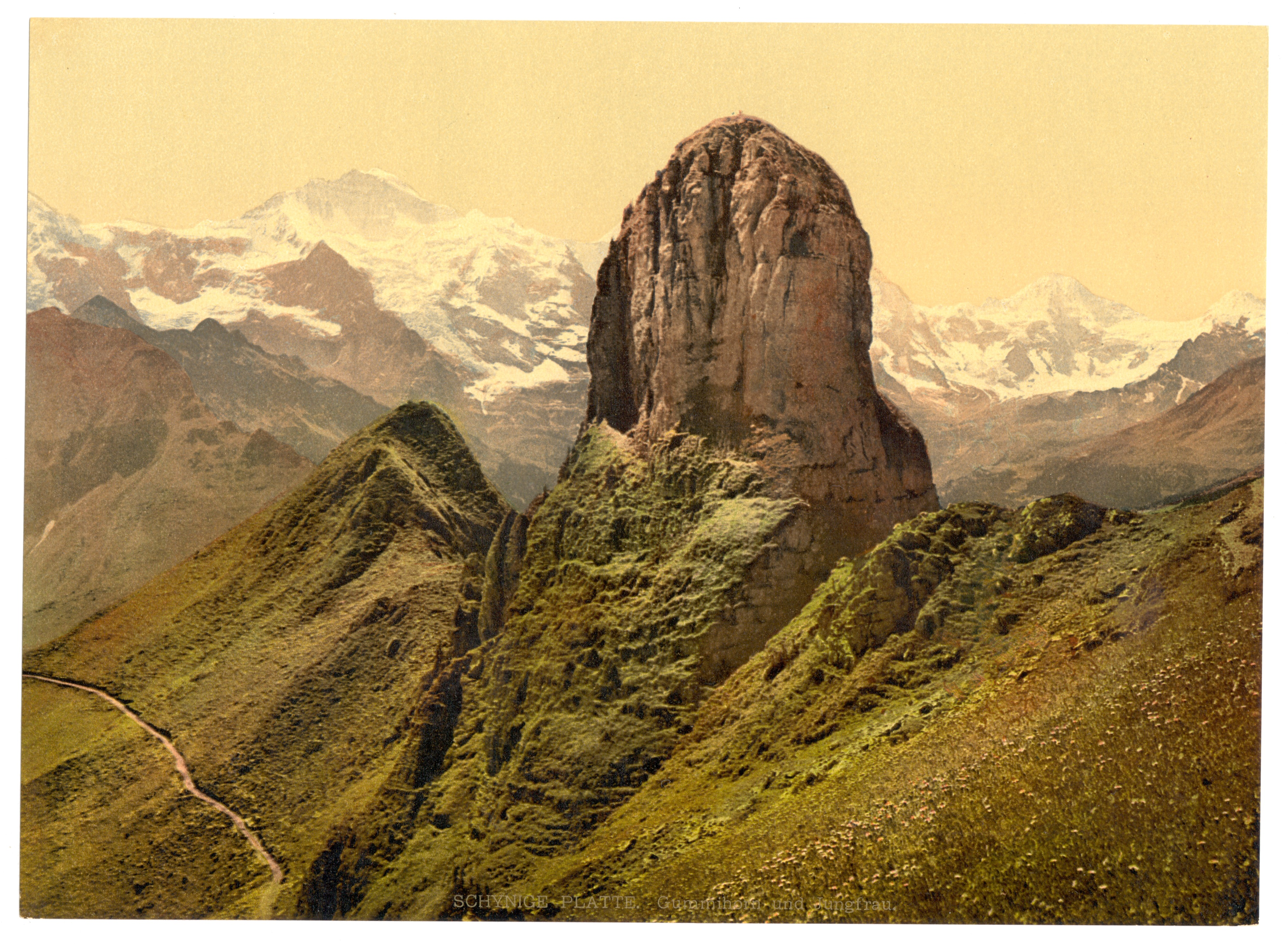
- View from the north

Highest point
- Elevation: 2,099 m (6,886 ft)
- Prominence: 167 m (548 ft)
- Coordinates: 46°39′19″N 07°54′29″E

Geography
- Location within Switzerland
- Country: Switzerland
- Canton: Bern
- Parent range: Bernese Alps
- Topo map: Swiss Federal Office of Topography swisstopo

The Gumihorn is a mountain of the Bernese Alps, the highest point of the Schynige Platte ridge, located at the western end of the Schwarzhorn group. It forms a limestone tower, overlooking the valley of the Lütschine. At 2,099 metres (6,886 ft), it is the highest summit lying west of the Loucherhorn.

The Gumihorn lies between the municipalities of Gsteigwiler and Gündlischwand, in the canton of Bern. Although its summit cannot be easily climbed, two other slightly lower summits on both sides of the peak can be easily reached from the Schynige Platte railway station, hence allowing a 360-degree view of the region. The highest is named Tuba or Daube (2,076 m; to the north) and the other, directly above the railway station, is named Geiss (2,067 m; to the south).

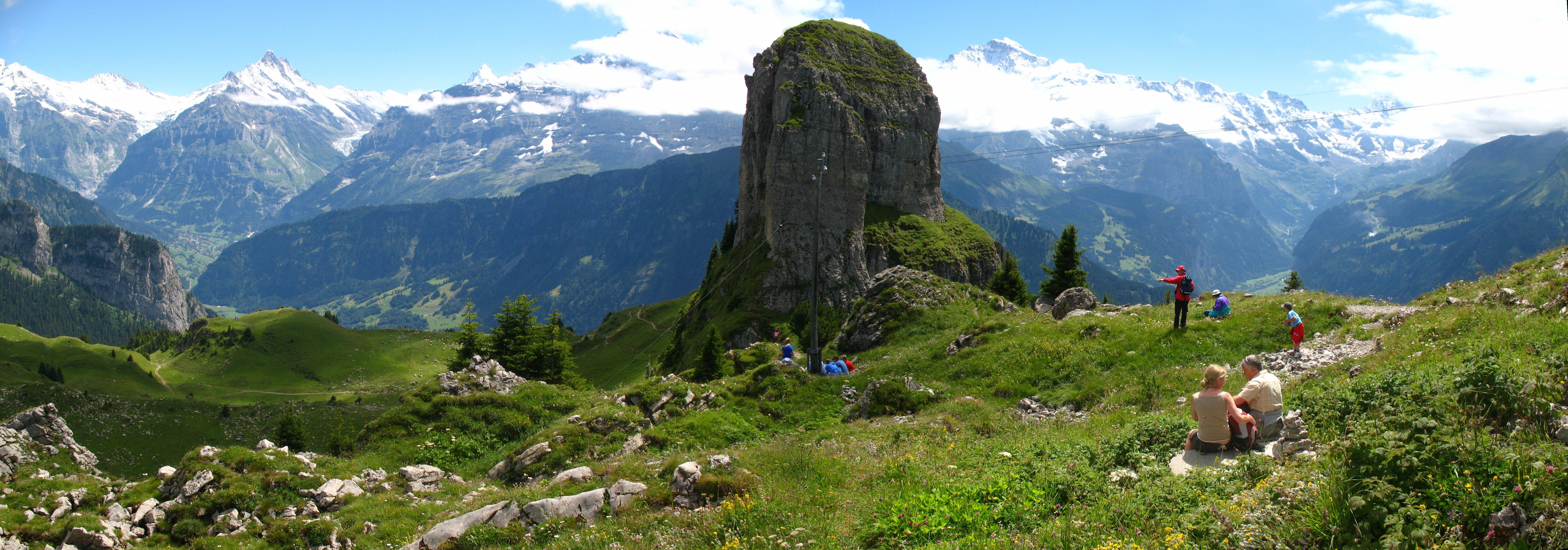
View from the Tuba summit with the massif of the Jungfrau in background
