= Schynige Platte =

Mountain ridge in the Bernese Highlands

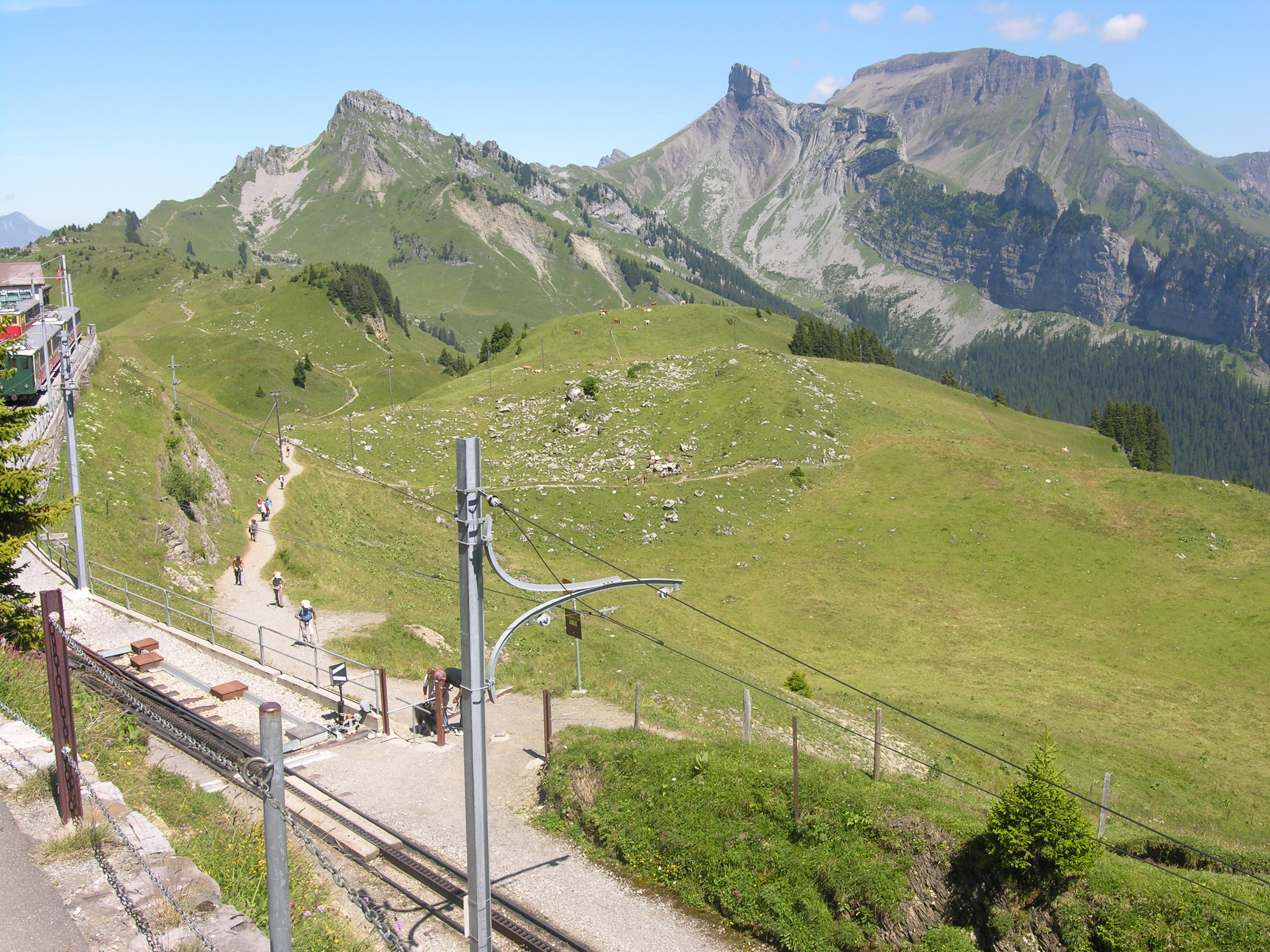
- Schynige Platte view (the railway station is visible)

Highest point
- Peak: Gumihorn
- Elevation: 2,099 m (6,886 ft)
- Coordinates: 46°39′22″N 7°54′25″E

Naming
- Language of name: German

Geography
- Location within Switzerland
- Country: Switzerland
- Canton: Bern
- Parent range: Bernese Alps
- Topo map: Swiss Federal Office of Topography swisstopo

Geology
- Mountain type: mountain ridge

Climbing
- Easiest route: Railway

The Schynige Platte (Scheinige Platte on the old Siegfried Map) is a small mountain ridge and a viewpoint in the Bernese Highlands and belongs to the Schwarzhorn group. The mountain range consists of three peaks: Gumihorn (2,099 m (6,886 ft)), Tuba (2,076 m (6,811 ft)), and the closest summit next to the viewpoint, Geiss (2,067 metres (6,781 ft)). The viewpoint lies at an altitude of about 2,000 metres (7,000 ft), at the western end of a prominent ridge of the Schwarzhorn group, which separates the valley of the Schwarze Lütschine from Lake Brienz.

It is notable for its hotel and, since 1893, its mountain railway, one of the highest in Switzerland. In good weather conditions there are views to many surrounding mountains, including the Eiger, Mönch, Jungfrau, and others giants of the Bernese Alps. Also, the town of Interlaken and the two great lakes of Thun and Brienz are visible to the north, 1,500 metres (4,900 ft) lower.

The area is accessible via the Schynige Platte railway, which runs from Wilderswil, where connection is made with Bernese Oberland railway trains from Interlaken. The railway reaches a height of 1,967 metres (6,453 ft) at the terminus station, on the south-facing slopes of Geiss summit. Southwest of the station is a hotel and mountain restaurant, at a height of 1,983 metres (6,506 ft). Northeast of the station is the Schynige Platte alpine botanical garden, specialising in the display of, and research into, the high altitude flora of Switzerland.

A number of short loop trails extend north from the train station, reaching several view points, all within one kilometre from each other. Directly above the station and hotel, and overlooking the valleys of Lauterbrunnen and Grindelwald, is the Geiss summit (2,067 metres (6,781 ft)). Further north, and overlooking Interlaken and the two great lakes, are the Tuba (2,076 metres (6,811 ft)) and Oberberghorn (2,069 metres (6,788 ft)) summits. The highest summit in the Schynige Platte area, between the Daube and Geiss summits, the tower-like Gumihorn peak (2,099 metres (6,886 ft)), cannot be reached by pedestrians. The Schynige Platte is also the starting point for the popular hiking trails to Loucherhorn, Faulhorn or First which is connected to Grindelwald by a gondola lift.

Administratively, the area is shared between the municipalities of Gündlischwand and Gsteigwiler, the tripoint between the municipalities of Bönigen, Gündlischwand and Gsteigwiler being on the Tuba summit. All the municipalities are in the canton of Bern.

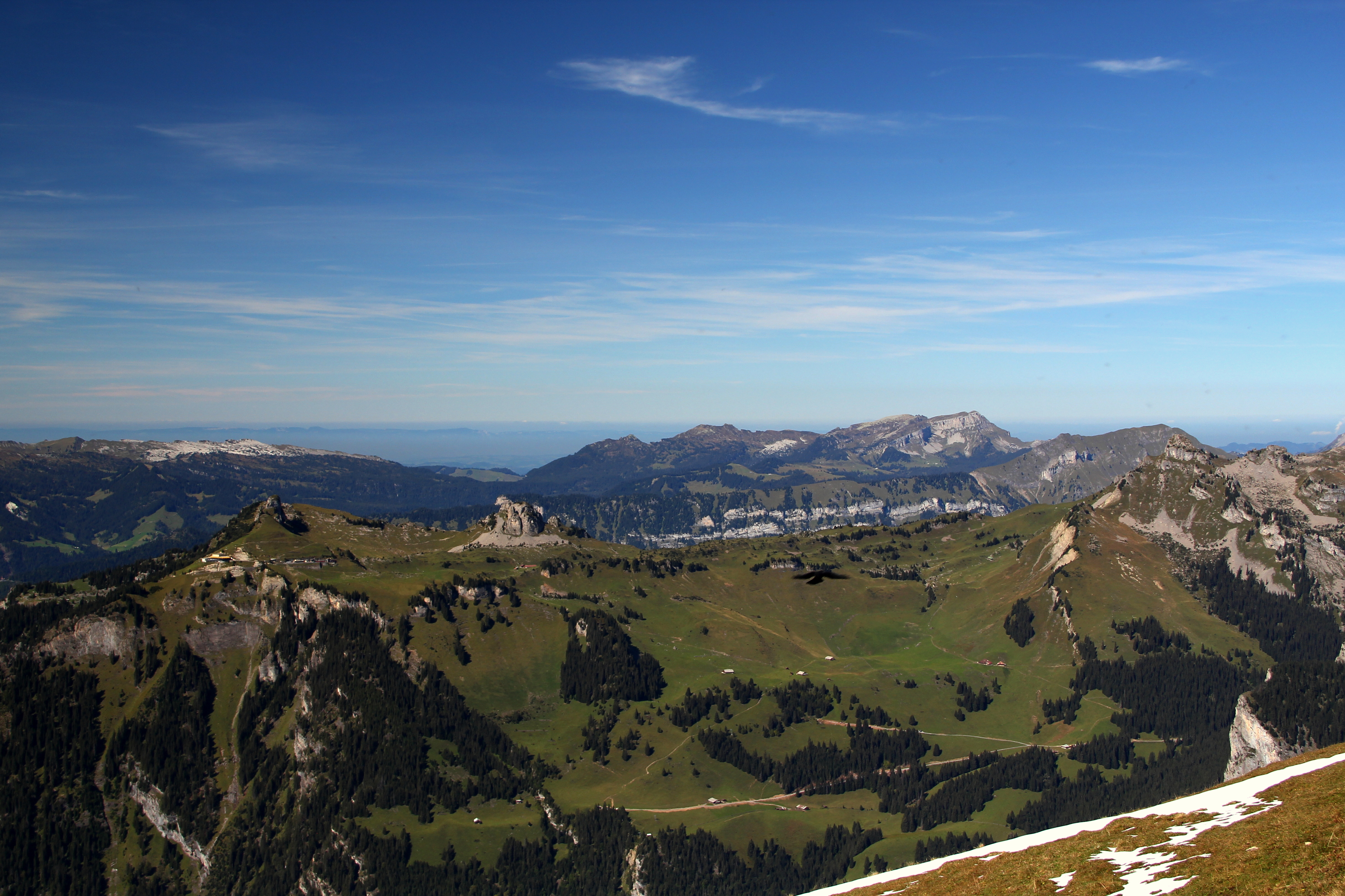
Schynige Platte from the south, with the railway station at the left (western) end of the ridge, and the Oberberghorn and Loucherhorn to the right.

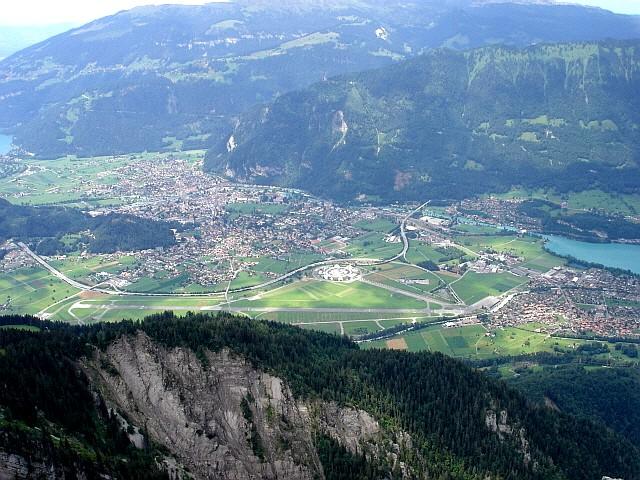
View from the Schynige Platte over the Bödeli and Interlaken, with the Thunersee to the left and the Brienzersee to the right.

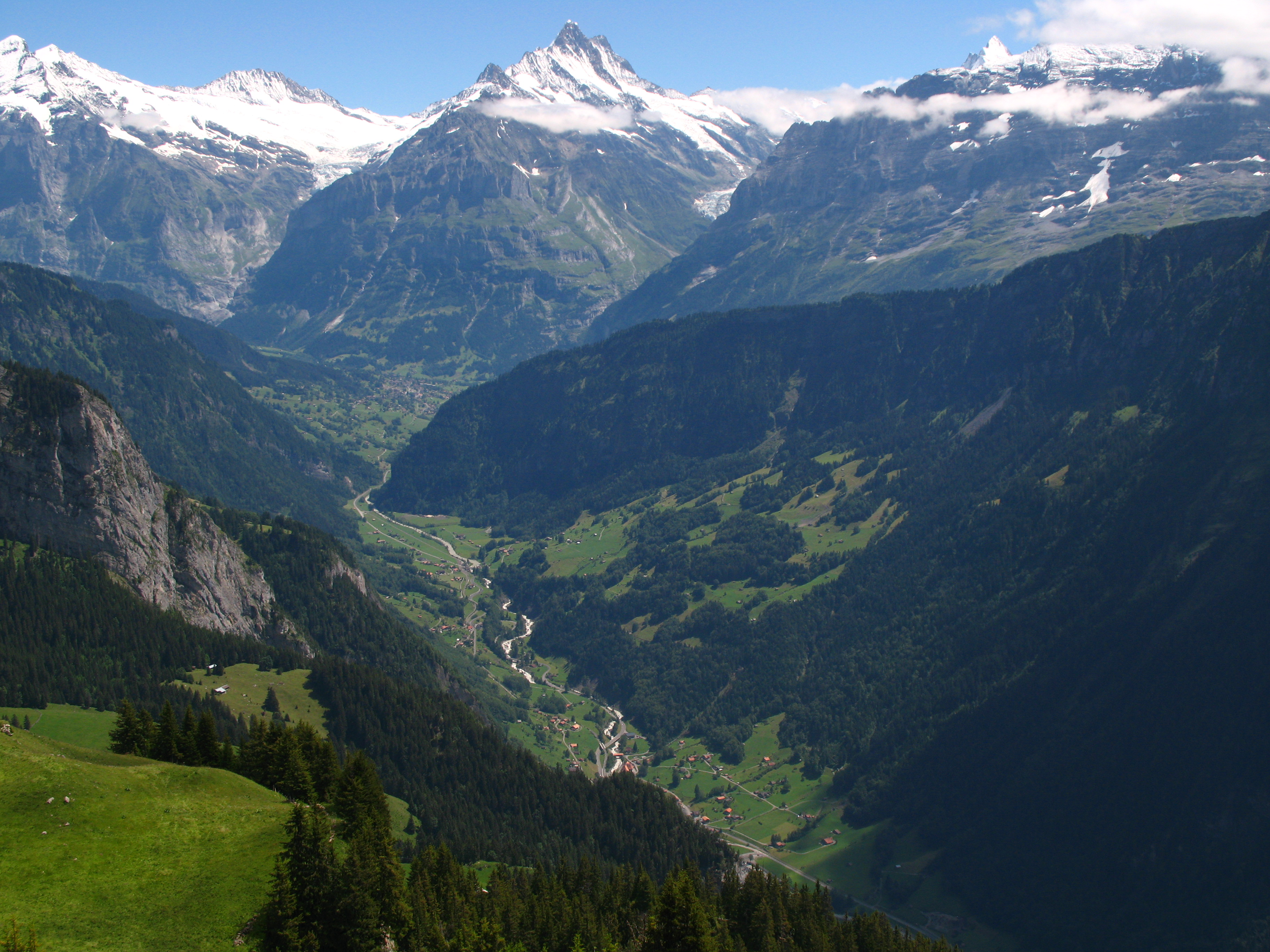
View from the Schynige Platte up the valley of the Schwarze Lütschine, with the Wetterhorn, Mettenberg, Schreckhorn and Finsteraarhorn behind.

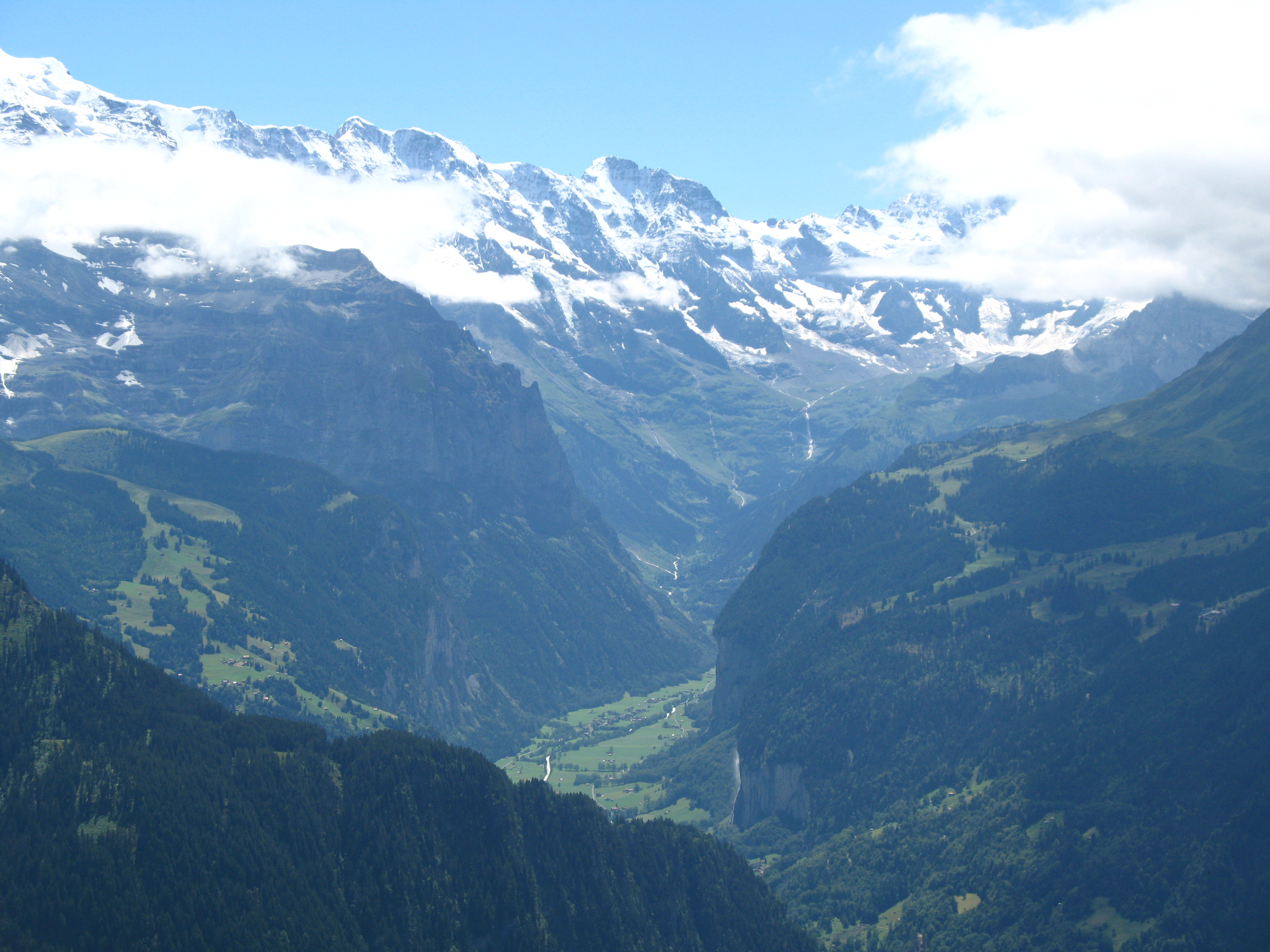
View from the Schynige Platte up the Lauterbrunnen Valley, with the Ebnefluh, Mittaghorn, Grosshorn and Breithorn behind.
