= Wildgärst =

Mountain of the Bernese Alps

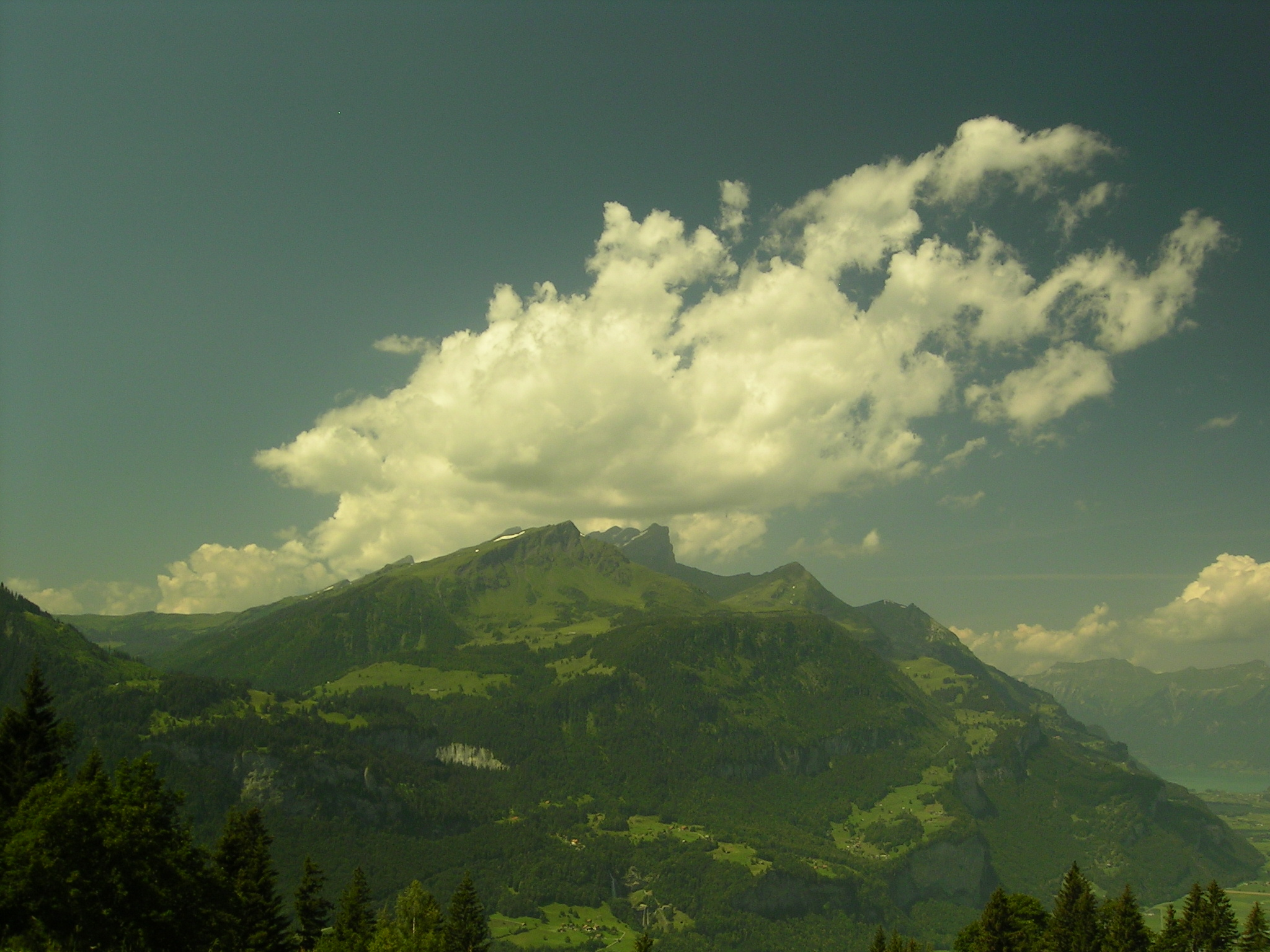
- The Wildgärst (centre background) from the east side

Highest point
- Elevation: 2,891 m (9,485 ft)
- Prominence: 187 m (614 ft)
- Parent peak: Schwarzhorn
- Coordinates: 46°41′33.1″N 8°4′27.6″E

Geography
- Location within Switzerland
- Location: Bern, Switzerland
- Parent range: Bernese Alps

The Wildgärst is a mountain of the Bernese Alps, overlooking Lake Brienz in the Bernese Oberland. It lies north of the Schwarzhorn, on the range between Lake Brienz and the Grosse Scheidegg.
