= Roteflue =

Mountain of the Bernese Alps

- Location within Switzerland

Highest point
- Elevation: 2,296 m (7,533 ft)
- Prominence: 171 m (561 ft)
- Parent peak: Schwarzhorn
- Coordinates: 46°40′53.1″N 7°57′27.7″E

Geography
- Location: Bern, Switzerland
- Parent range: Bernese Alps

The Roteflue (also spelled Rotefluh) is a mountain of the Bernese Alps, overlooking Lake Brienz in the Bernese Oberland. It is located west of the Faulhorn.
