= Loucherhorn =

Mountain of the Bernese Alps

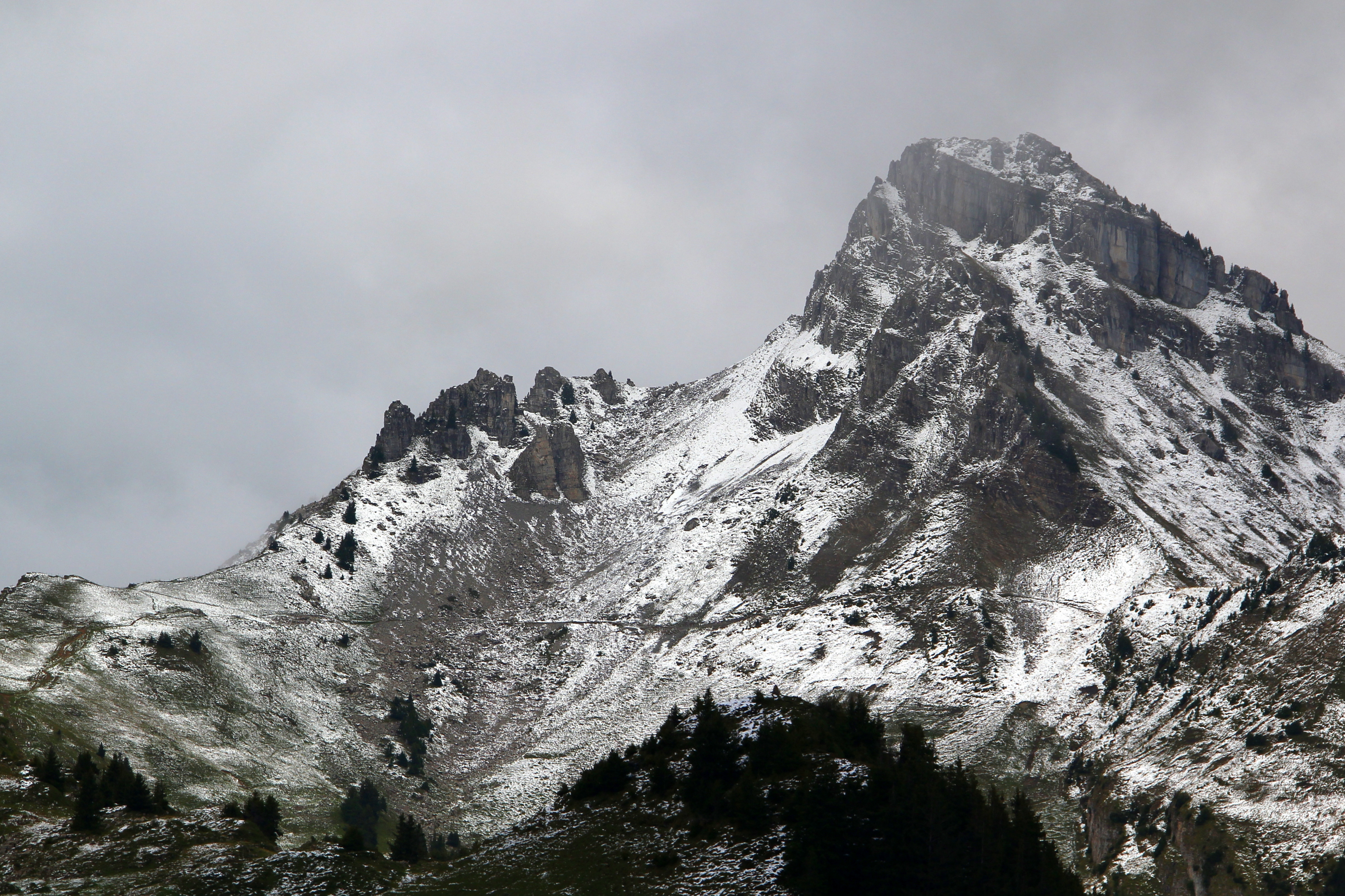

Highest point
- Elevation: 2,230 m (7,320 ft)
- Prominence: 80 m (260 ft)
- Parent peak: Roteflue
- Coordinates: 46°39′59.2″N 7°56′5.6″E

Geography
- Location within Switzerland
- Location: Bern, Switzerland
- Parent range: Bernese Alps

The Loucherhorn is a mountain of the Bernese Alps, overlooking Lake Brienz in the Bernese Oberland. It is located east of the Schynige Platte.
