= Axalp =

High alpine pasture in the Bernese Oberland

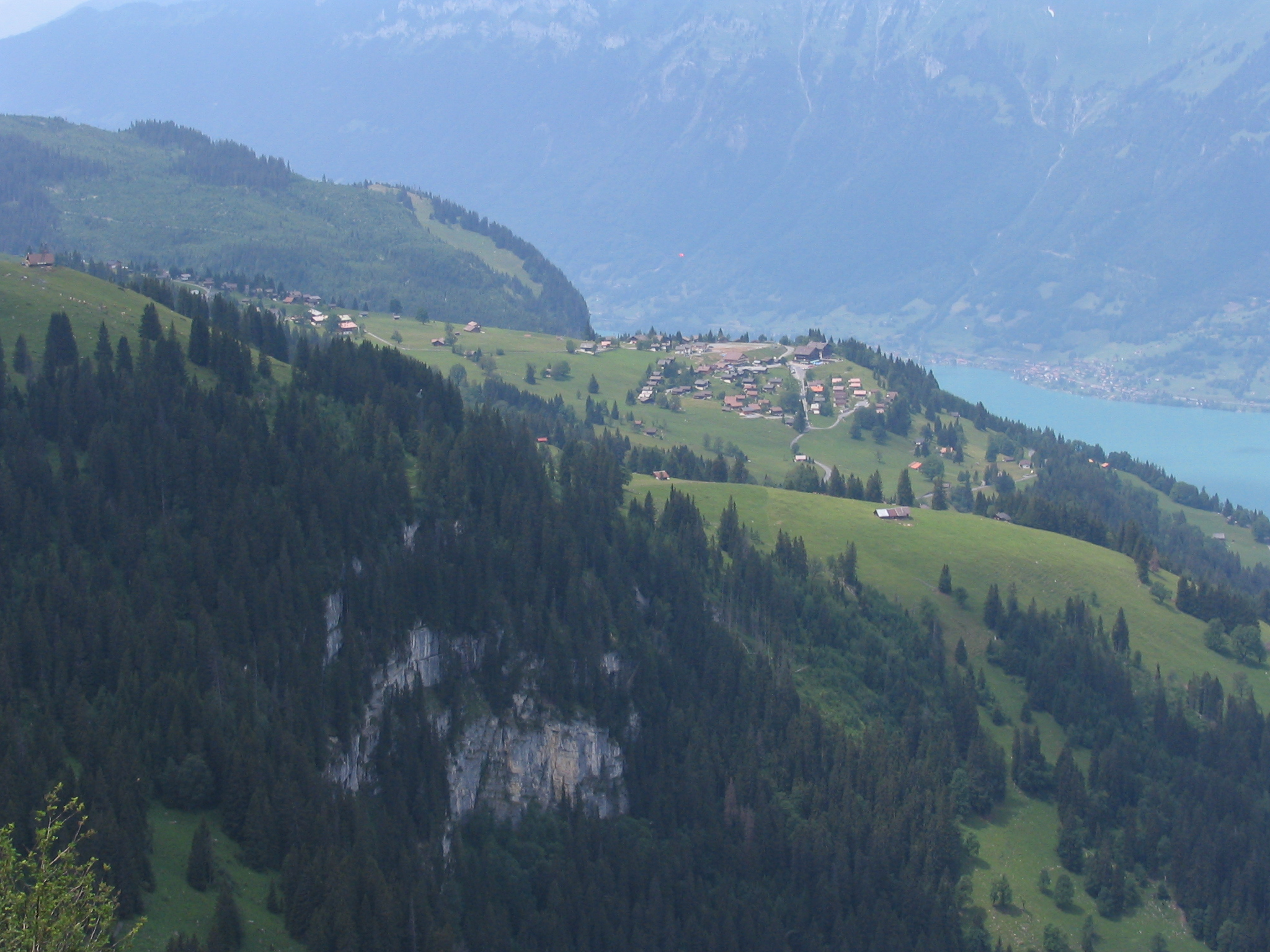
Axalp and Lake Brienz seen from below Oltschiburg.

Axalp is a high alpine pasture in the Bernese Oberland, on the northern slope of Axalphorn, overlooking Lake Brienz, today part of Brienz municipality.

Axalp was historically the name of the high pastures (alps), on the northern slopes of the Axalpburg, Tschingel and Axalphorn peaks, between c. 1500 m and 1900 m (46.712°N 8.046°E). Axalp was developed as a tourist resort since the late 19th century, and as a ski resort since the 1960s. In the later 20th century, the name of the pasture has been transferred to the ski resort, including the infrastructure, hotels and chalets built up below Axalp proper, between 1400 m and 1500 m.

== History ==
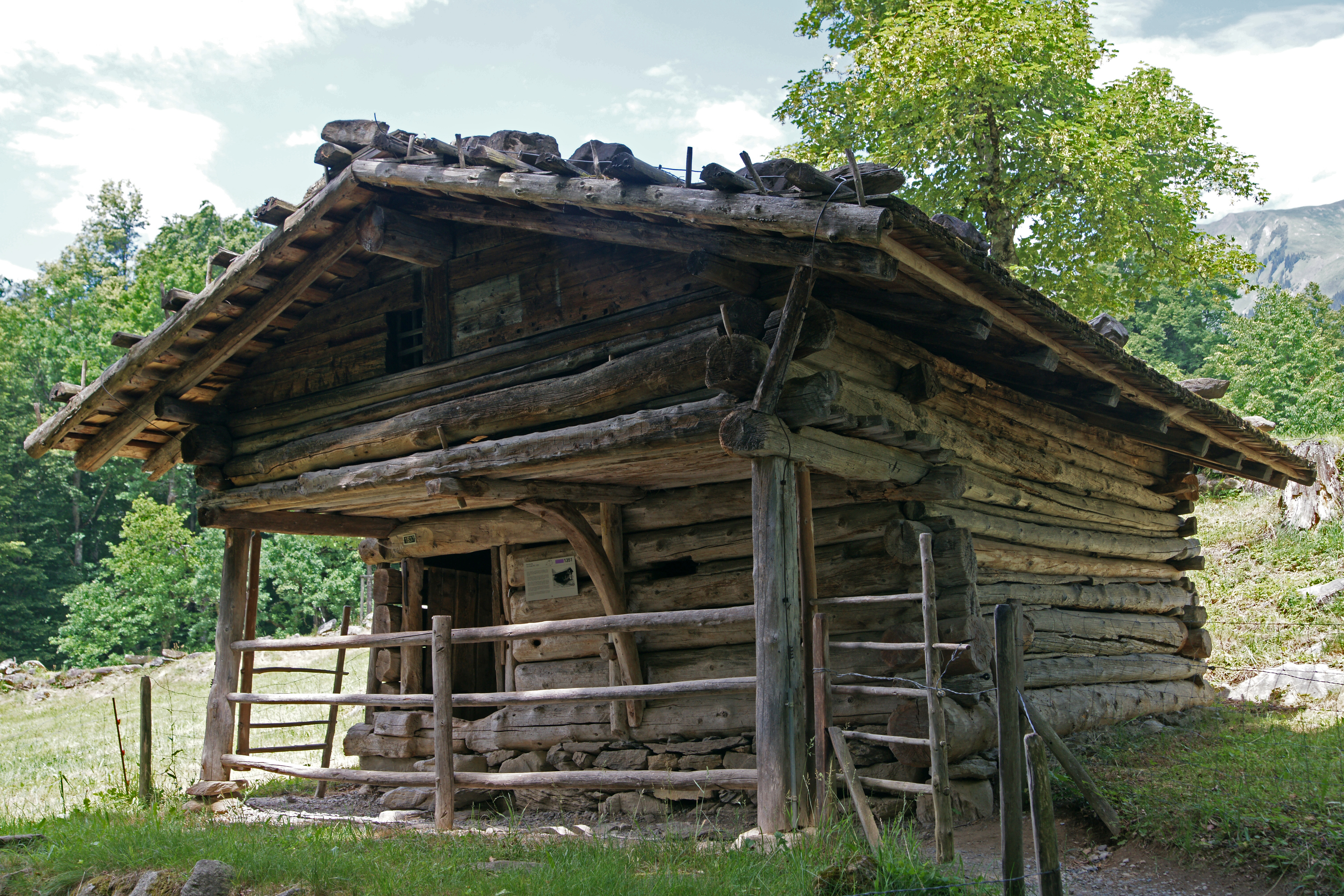
The 16th-century cottage from Lütschentälti (Litschentellti), now in the Ballenberg open air museum.

Axalp is one of three traditional alpine cooperatives south of Brienz, the other two being Hinterburg (46.724°N 8.078°E, 1550 m to 1900 m) and Tschingelfeld (46.685°N 8.038°E, 1620 m to 2100 m), to the east and south of Axalp, respectively. Archaeological finds at Axalp Chüemad (46.708°N 8.035°E, 1800 m) date to the Bronze Age. The toponym Axalp is from Celtic *ask- "pasture" (a regular cognate of Latin pasco "to feed, pasture").

Axalp has been continuously cultivated since it was reached by the Walser migration of the 12th to 13th centuries. The alp Hinterburg is on record for the year 1275. As part of the Walser sphere, traditional economy and culture is closely related to that of the Upper Valais. The production of the Mutschler (Mutschli) cheese of Brienz is closely related to the alpine cheese of Obergoms (which latter cheese has been developed into the Raclette cheese of the modern period). Alpine transhumance continues to be practised, but has been somewhat reduced in intensity during the first half of the 20th century. Lütschentälti, south of the Tschingel ridge, used to be part of Axalp but in 1931 was discontinued as cattle pasture, reducing cattle transhumance from three to two seasonal levels. One of the historical buildings, dated c. 1520, was moved to the Ballenberg open air museum in 2003.

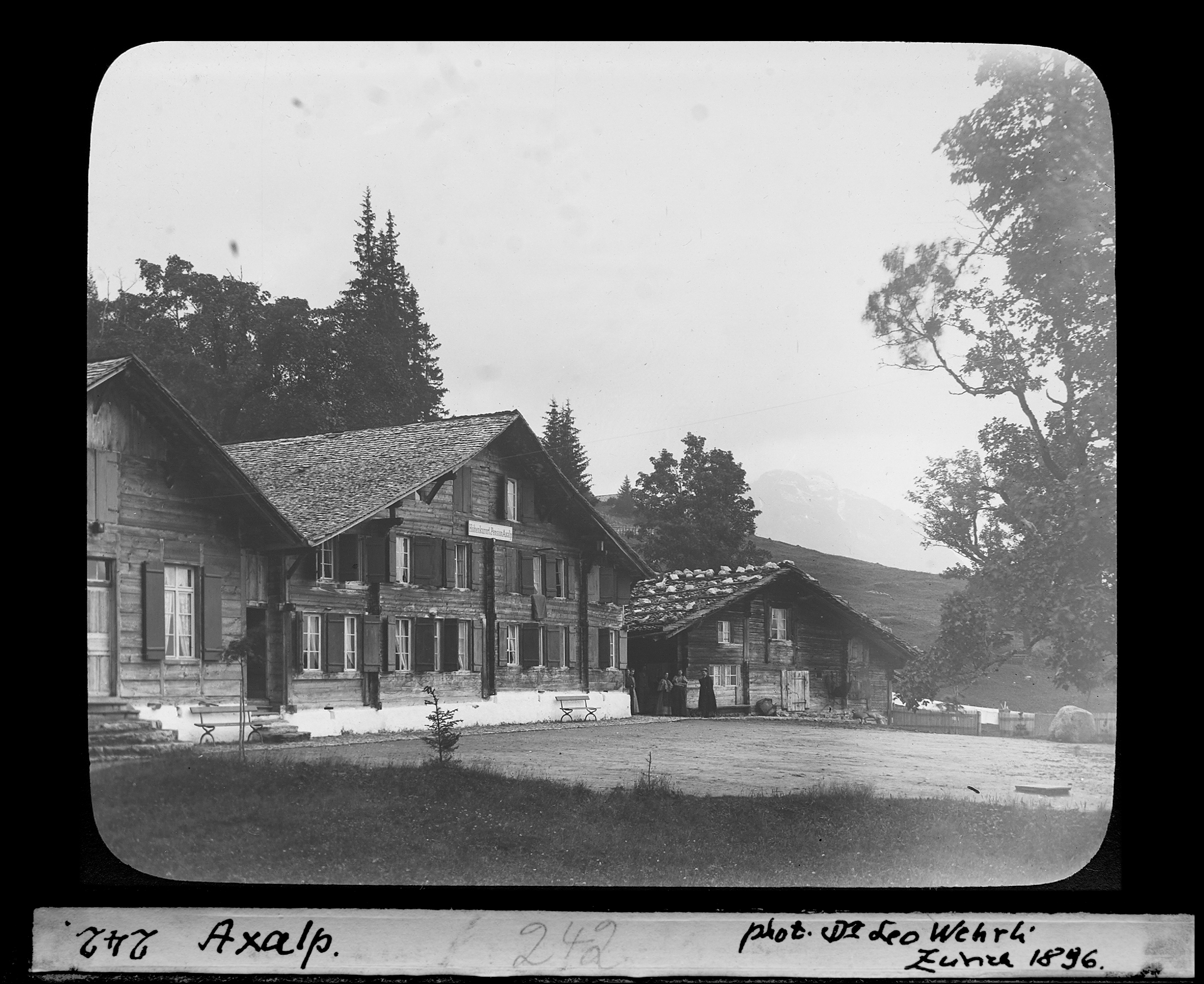
Höhenkurort Pension Axalp in 1896

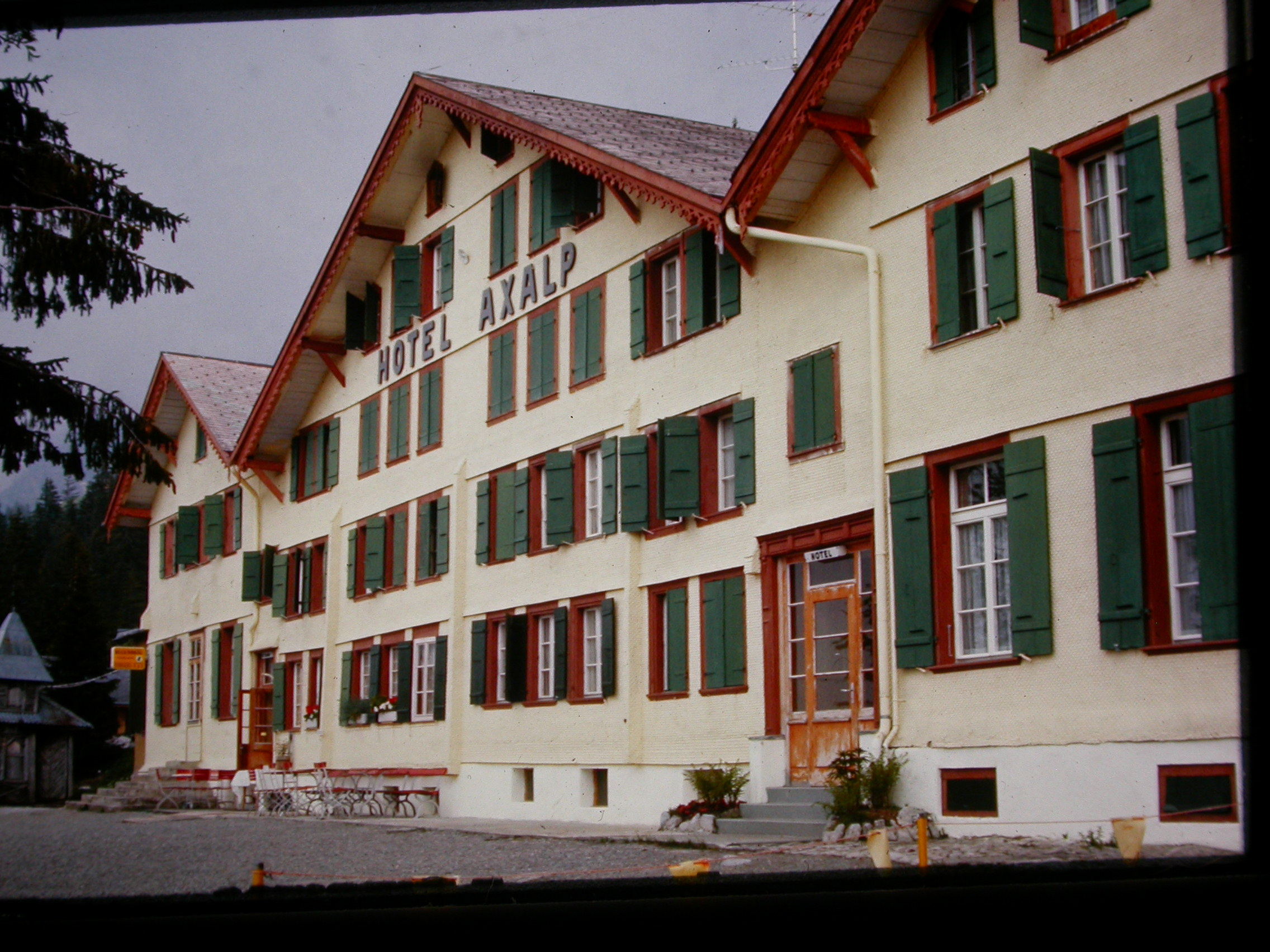
Hotel Axalp in 1975

With the development of tourism in the region in the late 19th century, two hotels were built below Axalp, near Hüttboden hamlet. Two Brienz teachers, Peter Flück-Eggler and Johann Michel Eggler opened Pension Axalp in 1879, at 1535 m. The hotel was a commercial success and quickly grew into a large establishment advertised as health resort, also known as Kurhaus Axalp from the 1890s (later known as Alpengasthof Axalp). Two other Brienz entrepreneurs, Peter Kuster and Johannes von Bergen-Fuchs, opened a second hotel, hotel Bellevue, at 1460 m. The hotels were made accessible by road in the 1920s. An Axalp ski club was founded in 1935. However, tourism lagged during the World Wars period.

The Swiss Air Force shooting range Axalp-Ebenfluh (46.707°N 8.054°E, 2240 m) was installed during World War II under Henri Guisan, in combination with Meiringen Air Base. It was created for the purpose of combined arms exercises of close air support of infantry in alpine environment. The first exercise took place on 7 October 1942.

After the end of World War II, the ski resort began to be developed. The first ski lift opened in 1957, connecting Widerberg, at 1300 m, with hotel Bellevue at 1460 m. The company Sportbahnen Axalp Windegg AG was established in 1967. A bus service was offered by a private company from 1964, since 1970 the road has also been maintained during winter. The bus service was incorporated into PostBus Switzerland in 2006. The bus connection from Brienz to Axalp, Sportbahnen takes 40 minutes, running three times a day (five times on weekends.) The Axalp-Windegg cable car (1540 m to 1910 m) was built in 1996/7, replacing the 1970s ski lift. A third hotel, Chemihüttli, opened in 2006.

However, with the reduced snowfall since the 1990s, the ski resort came into financial difficulties. Sporthotel Axalp AG, the former Alpengasthof, was liquidated in 2011, bought by Gastro Oberland AG. The main building was torn down in 2012, while part of the premises were converted into a restaurant, Axalp Stübli, and a self-catering hostel, Cheminée Stübli. Zukunft Axalp, a private association with the purpose of saving the ski resort was formed in 2017.

== Fliegerschiessen Axalp ==
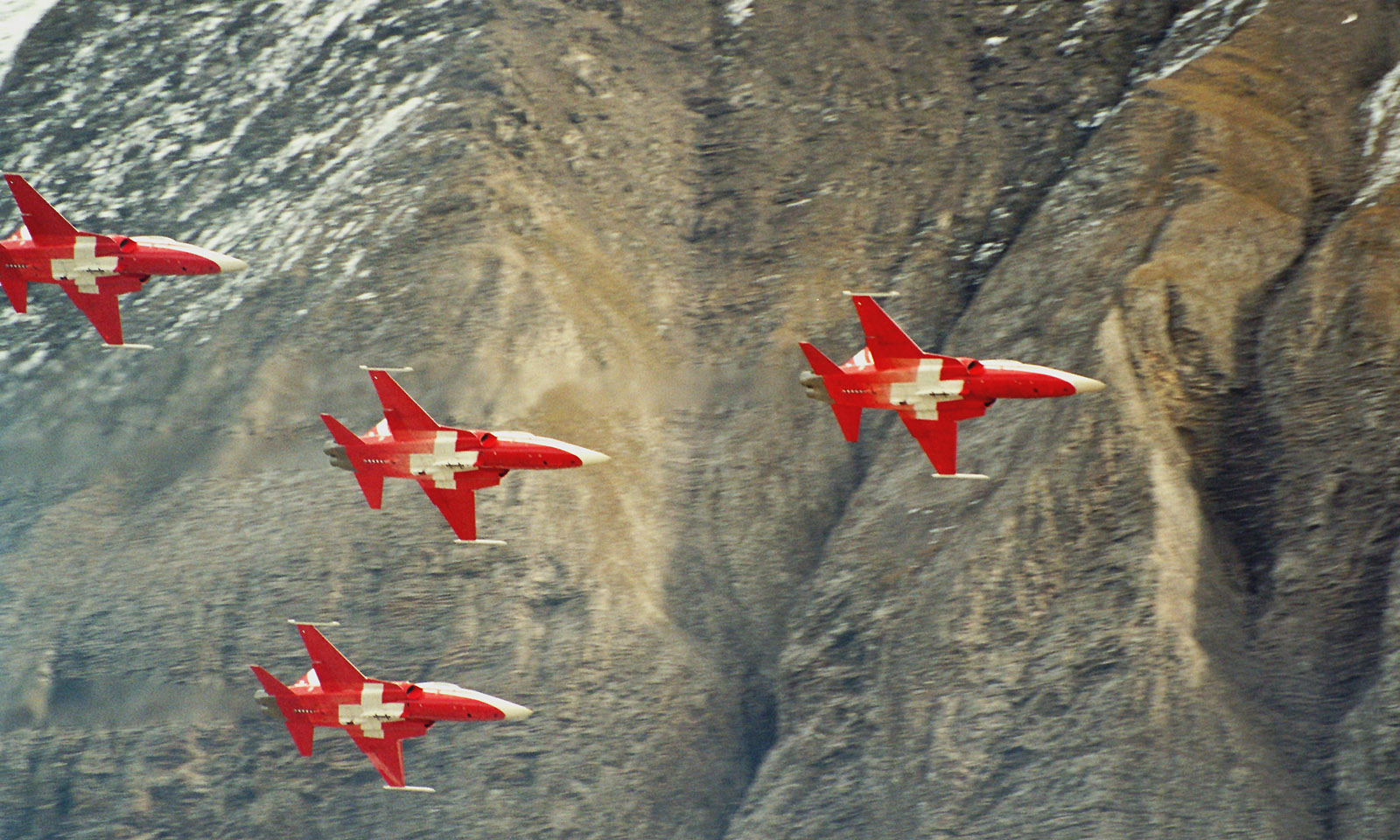
Patrouille Suisse passing in front of the Ebenfluh rock face (2006).

The aviation live fire demonstration Axalp (known as Fliegerschiessen or "aviator shooting") is an air show of the Swiss Air Force on the shooting range Axalp-Ebenfluh (also called Äbeflue). There is a designated spectator area at the summit of Tschingel (46.7066°N 8.0476°E, 2240 m), about 1 km west of the target area.

Initially a wartime exercise arena, in use during 1942–1945, Axalp-Ebenfluh was retained as an air force training ground after 1945. The first shooting exercise with jet engine planes, de Havilland Vampire, was held in 1949. Exercises were not public, and observation was by invitation. British Field Marshal Bernard Montgomery and Marshal of the Royal Air Force Lord Tedder were present at the exercise of February 1950. The exercises are usually held annually over two days on the beginning of October. Fighter planes no longer do bombing runs with exercise bombs, as was the original main purpose of the wartime exercise range. The event was extended into a public air show in the 1990s, in addition to the live fire exercises also including aerobatic displays, including performances by Patrouille Suisse. The "live fire" involves the use of aircraft cannons on ground targets mounted on the rock face. Depending on weather conditions, there are also exercises involving army helicopters, parachutists or landing troops.

The event was cancelled in 2001 due to an accident with an air force Alouette III a few days before the scheduled date. The number of spectators was estimated at 6,500 in 2005, 9,000 in 2006 and 2009, and at 11,000 in 2012 The event was cancelled due to bad weather conditions in 2013 and 2015, and not scheduled in 2014 due to the Air14 show in Payerne. It was again cancelled in 2016 due to several accidents suffered by the Swiss Air Force. It was again held in 2017, 2018 and 2021.
