= Fliegerstaffel 1 =

Fliegerstaffel 1 1ème Escadrille Squadriglia d'aviazione 1
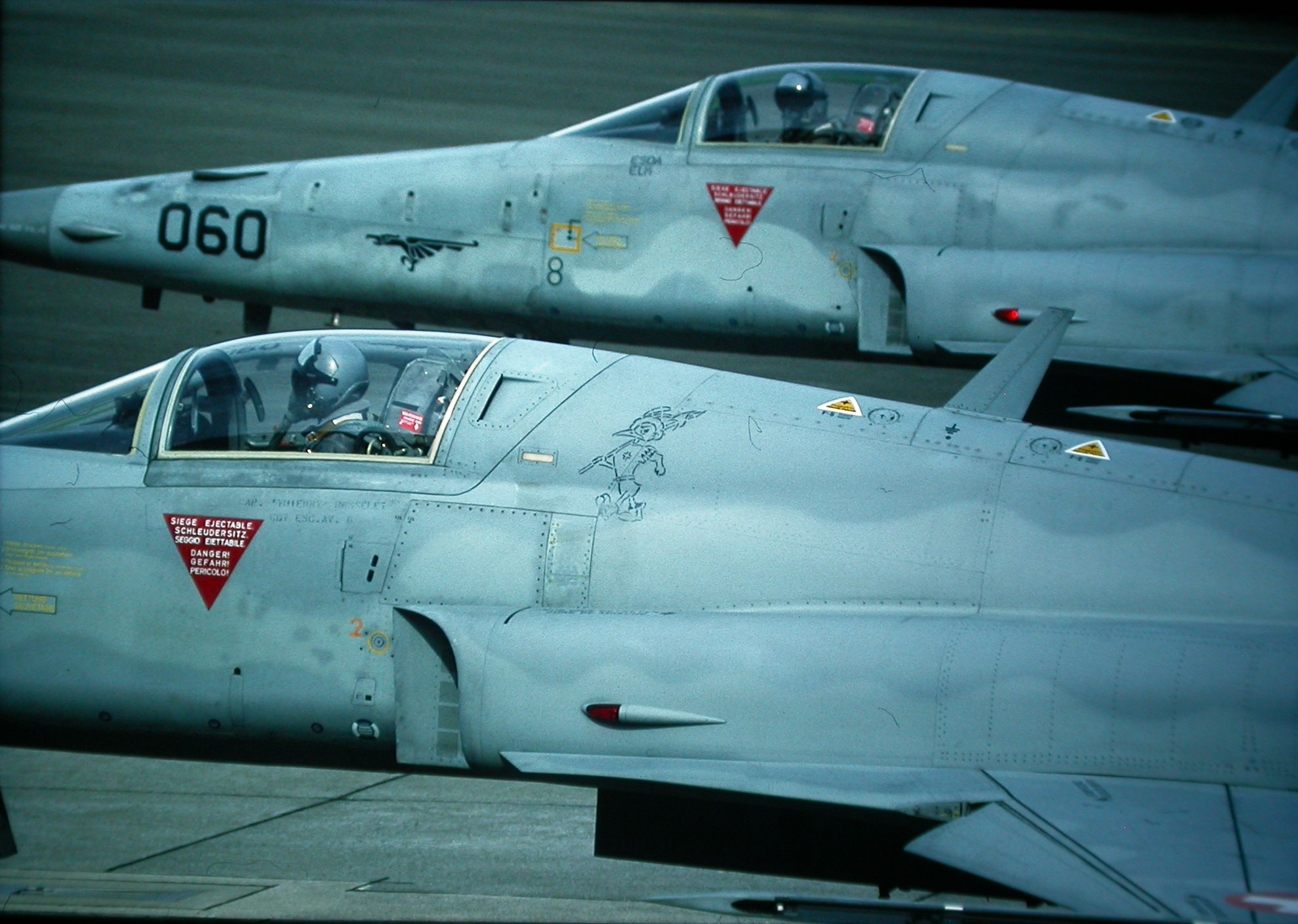
- F-5E J-3052 with low Visibility squadron emblem Fliegerstaffel 1
- Active: 1913-2003
- Country: Switzerland
- Branch: Swiss Air Force
- Role: Fighter squadron
- Garrison/HQ: military airfield of Turtmann

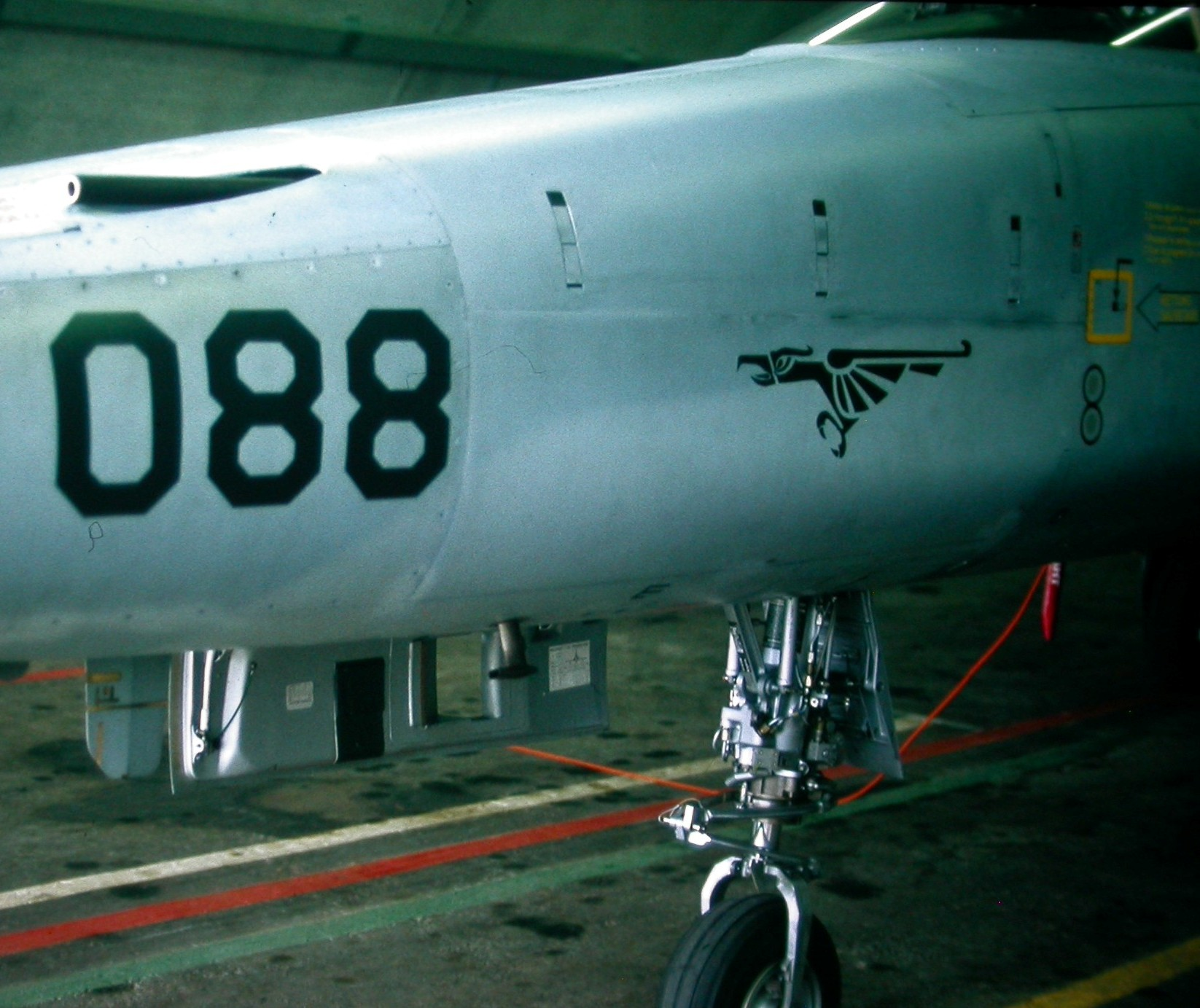
Fliegerstaffel 1 emblem on F-5E Tiger II with the number J-3088; On the aircraft is only the bird Rokh, without red background.

Fliegerstaffel 1 (No. 1 Squadron) was a professional military pilots squadron, belonging to the Überwachungsgeschwader of the Swiss Air Force until its last service in 2003. At that point, it was equipped with Northrop F-5 and used the military airfield of Turtmann as a designated war base. Fliegerstaffel 1 carried a stylized Vogel Rokh as its coat of arms, a red background and a white figure 1 completed their emblem.

== History ==
=== Early years ===
A first precursor was set up in 1913 as a pioneer company 1. At that time, the Kriegstechnische Abteilung (KTA) rented some machines from private ownership for experimental and evaluation purposes, e.g. A Blériot XI owned by Oskar Bider. On the outbreak of the First World War, the aircraft groups, now designated as Military Aircraft Division 1, did not have a single aircraft of their own. Imports from abroad were no longer possible because of the war. The first commander of the aircraft groups, Hptm (Captain) Theodor Real, had to requisition aircraft from private ownership. The first real combat aircraft was a German aircraft who made an emergency landing 1916 in Bettlach, an interned Fokker D.II. In 1917, five Nieuport 23 aircraft, built in France, were bought and remained operational until 1921. From 1920 a total of 27 used Fokker D.VII were bought, which together with the Häfeli DH-5, developed and built in Switzerland, formed the stock for the first two aircraft squadrons.

=== Development from 1924 ===
In 1924, the Fliegerkompanie 1 was set up and started with the Häfeli DH-5 and Fokker D-VII to operate from airfields at Lucerne, Payerne, Seedorf and La Chaux-de-Fonds. In 1933, the Fokker CV was added, and the C-3603 in 1942. The renaming into Fliegerstaffel 1 took place 1945 and but soon the name changed into the French designation Escadrille 1 in 1946, after moving to Payerne. Until 1951 the aircraft used was the Morane D-3800 was in use. From 1951 to 1959 the Escadrille 1 used its first jet aircraft, the De Havilland D.H. 100 Vampire, at the Payerne Air Base.

In 1955, the return to Dübendorf and the change of name back to Fliegerstaffel 1 took place. Near the main entrance of the Dübendorf Air Base is located a monument with the emblem of Fliegerstaffel 1, Vogel Rokh.

In 1959, the Hawker Hunter was re-trained on the wartime airbase. Fliegerstaffel 1 was chosen to show the Hawker Hunter in formation flight to the public until 1964. The team consisted of Hptm Brunold, Oblt Pellanda, Lt Spychiger and Adj Brülhart. The aerobatics team of the Fliegerstaffel 1 was renamed Patrouille Suisse in 1964 on the occasion of the Expo 64. In 1981, the Fliegerstaffel 1 got equipped with the Tiger F-5 and moved to the military airfield of Turtmann, where the aircraft was operated from the aircraft cavern, while the Patrouille Suisse still used the Hawker Hunter. 2003 was the last service course in Turtmann. On completion of that course in 2003, the military airfield Turtmann was closed, Fliegerstaffel 1 disbanded.

== Aircraft ==
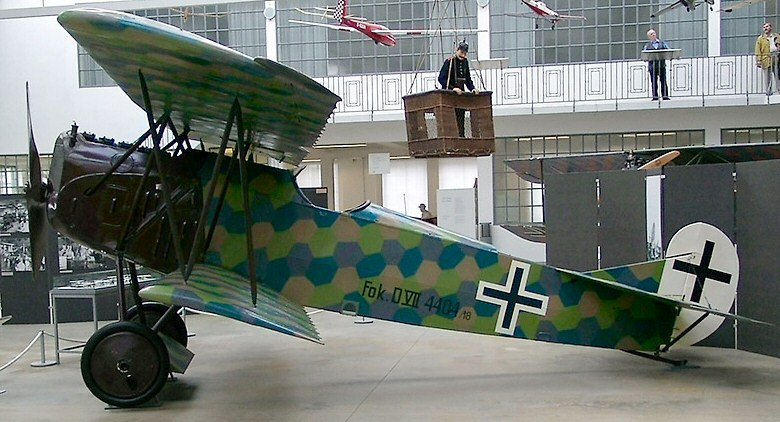
Fokker D-VII

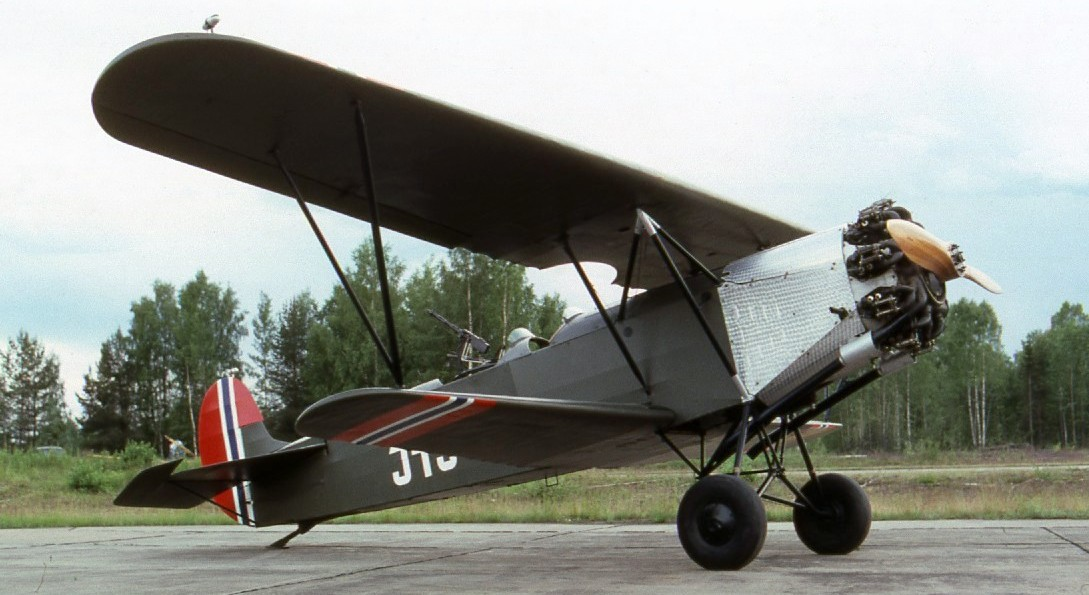
Fokker CV

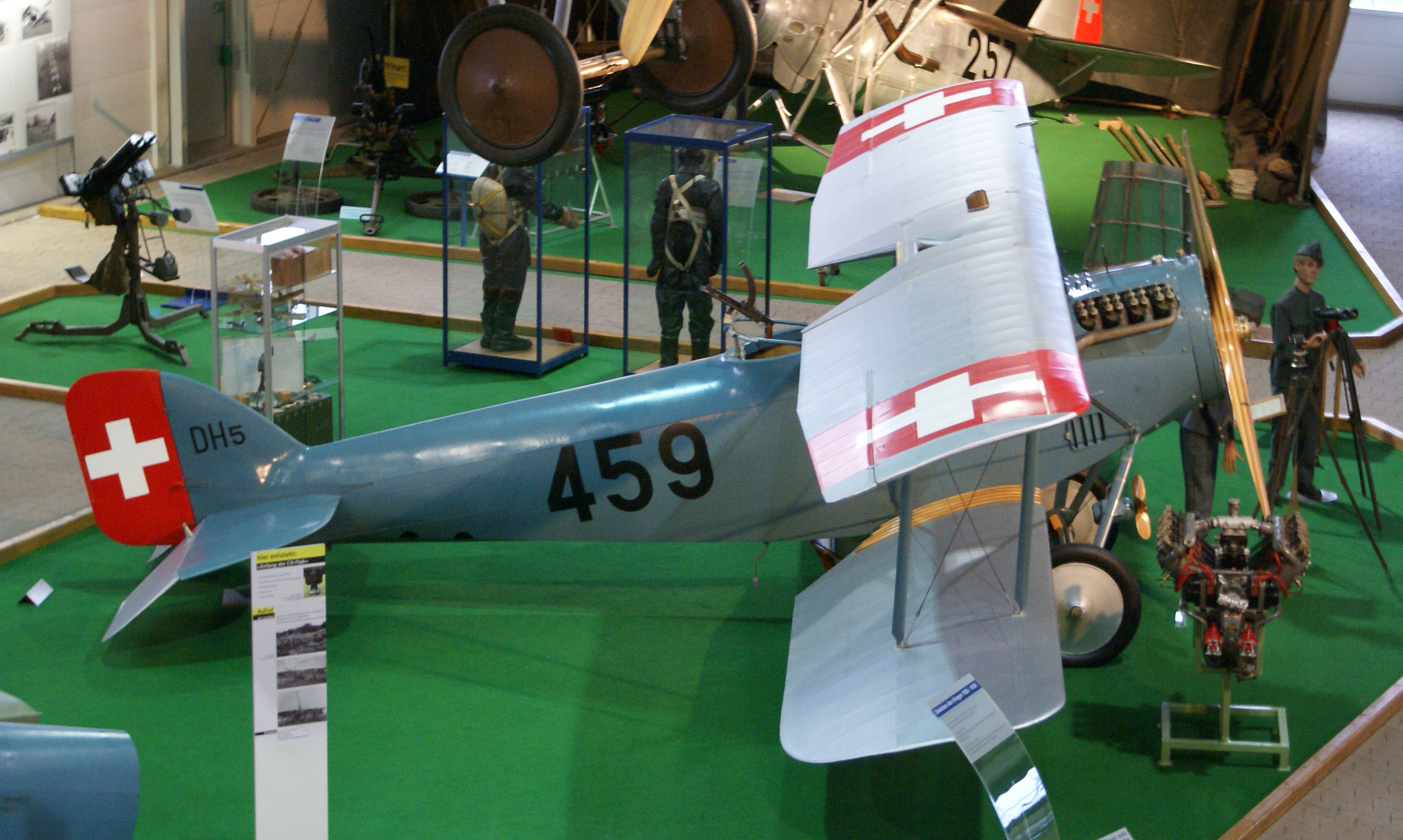
Häfeli DH-5

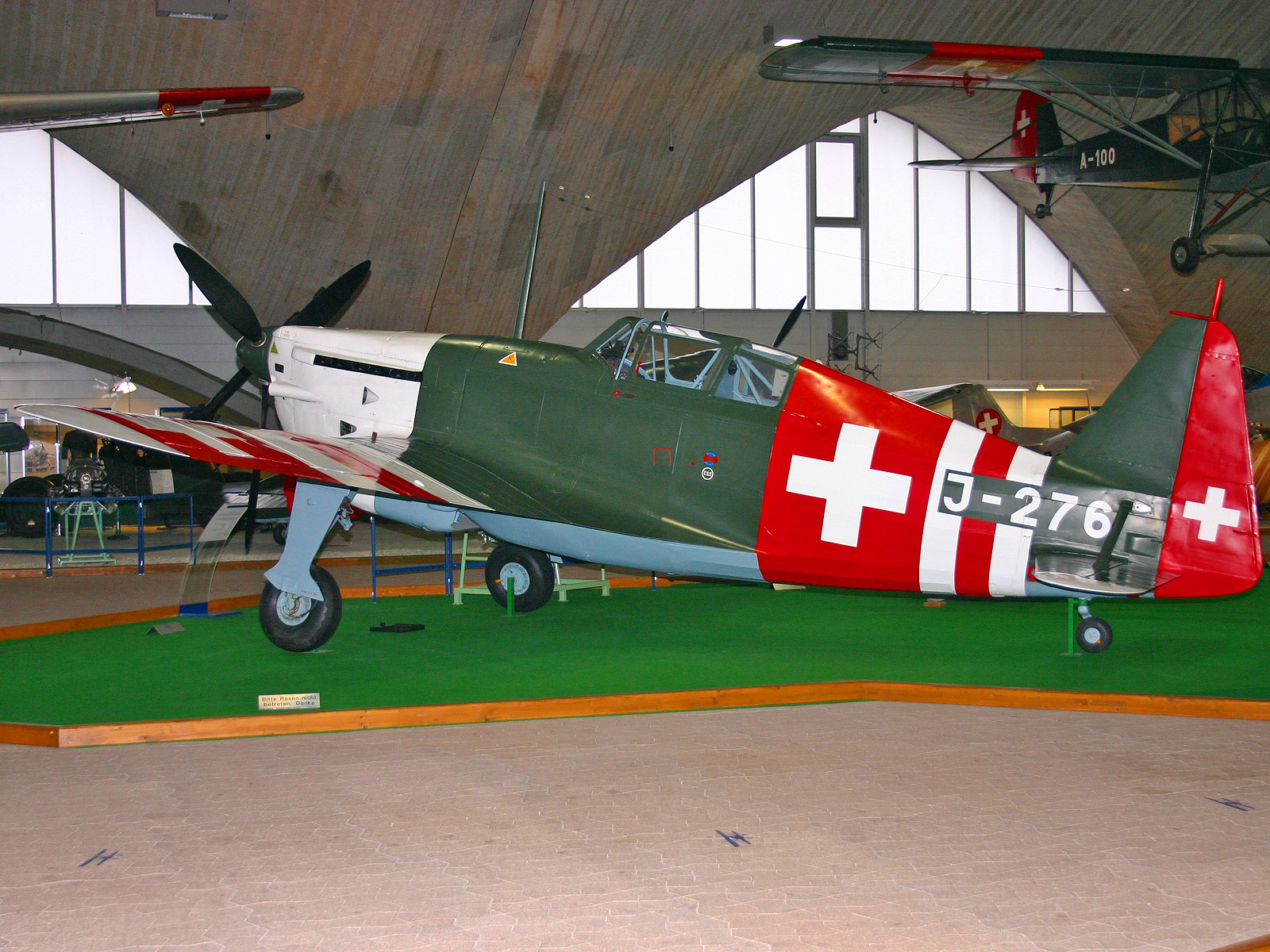
Morane D-3800

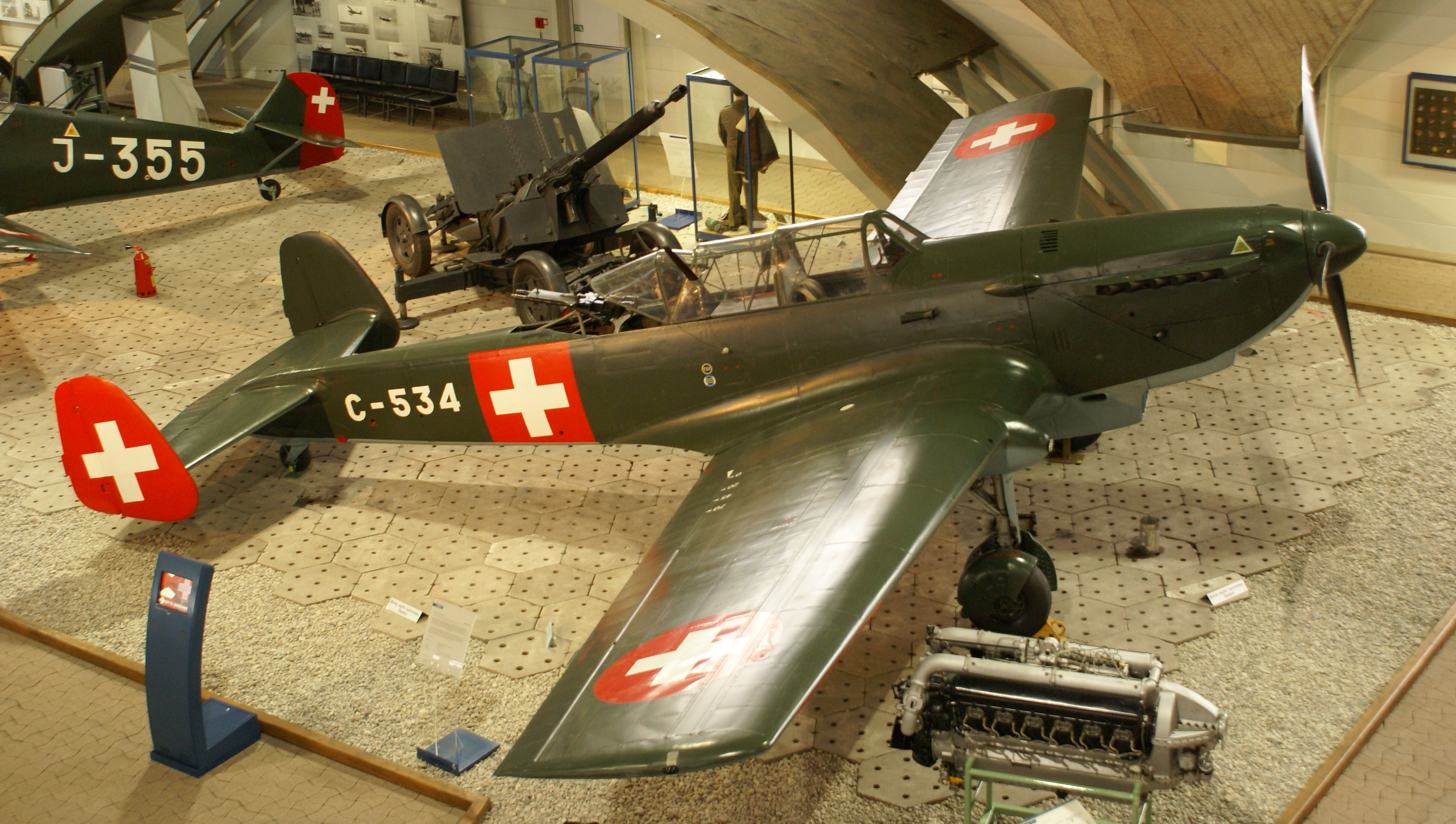
C-3603

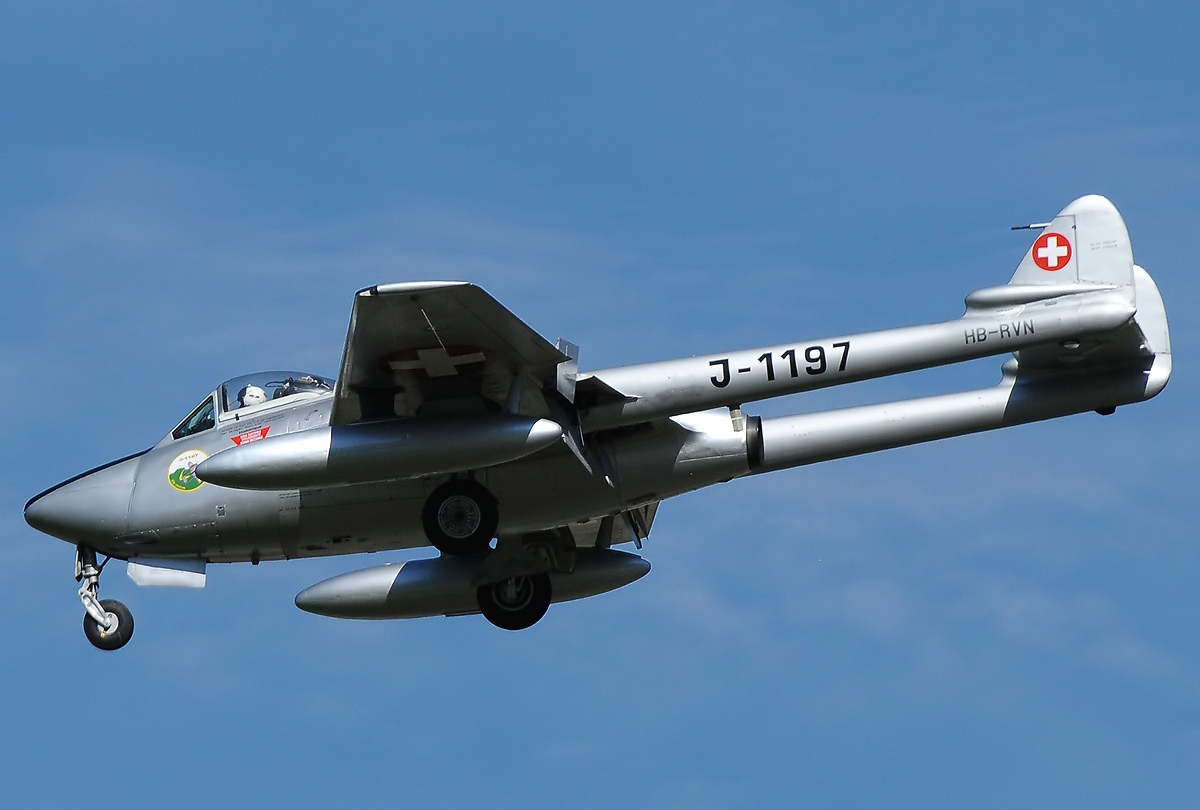
de Havilland Vampire

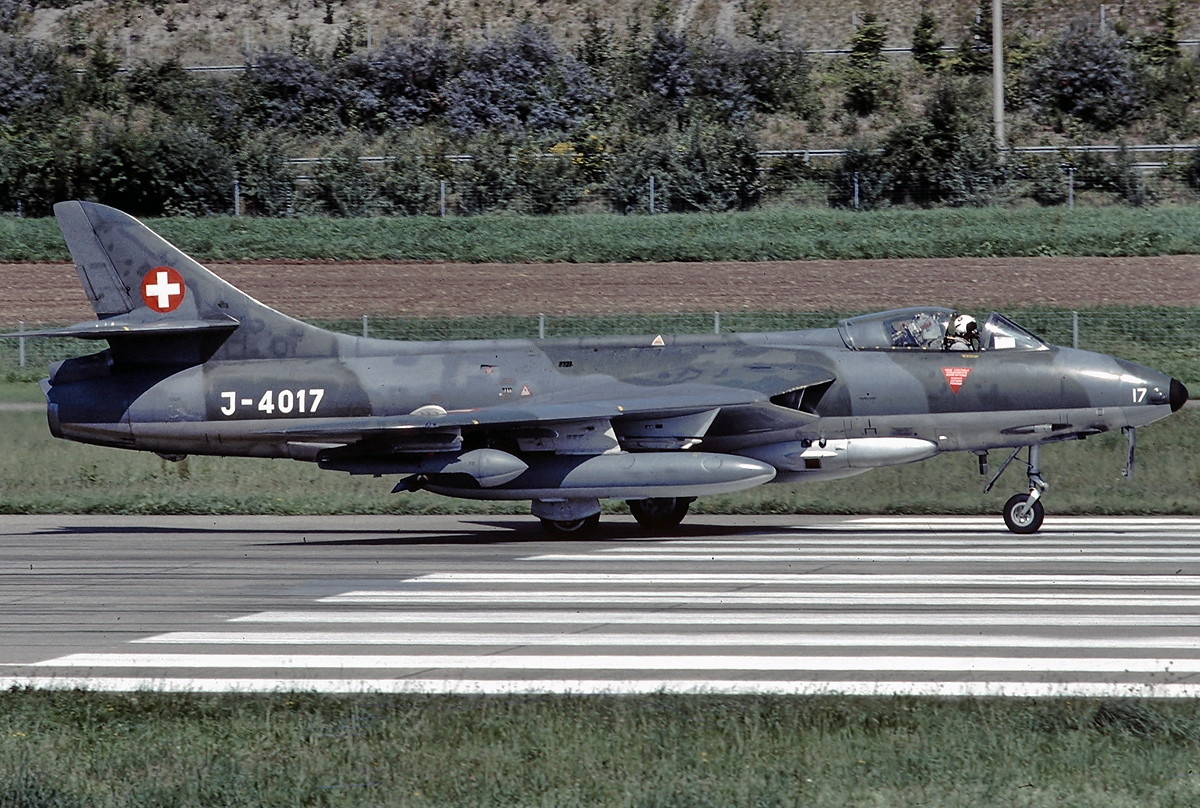
Hawker Hunter

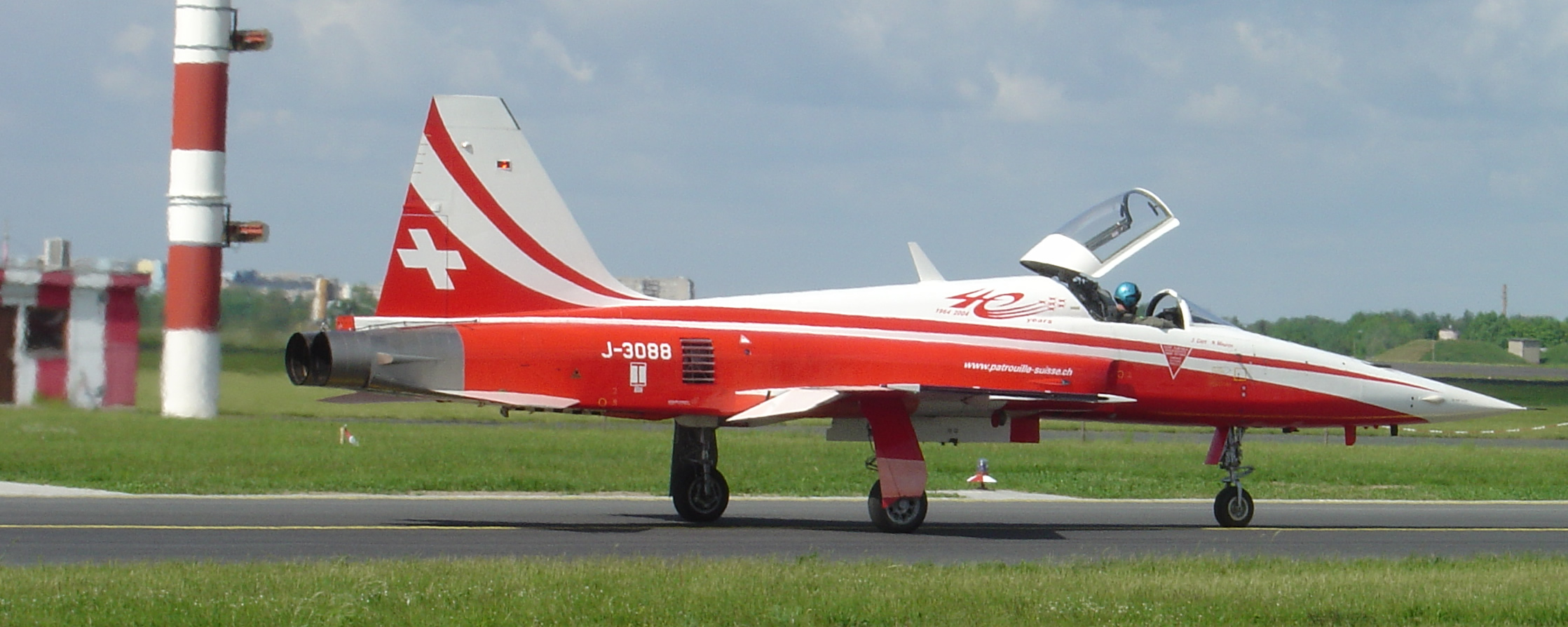
Northrop F-5
