= Grosse Scheidegg =

Mountain pass in the Bernese Alps

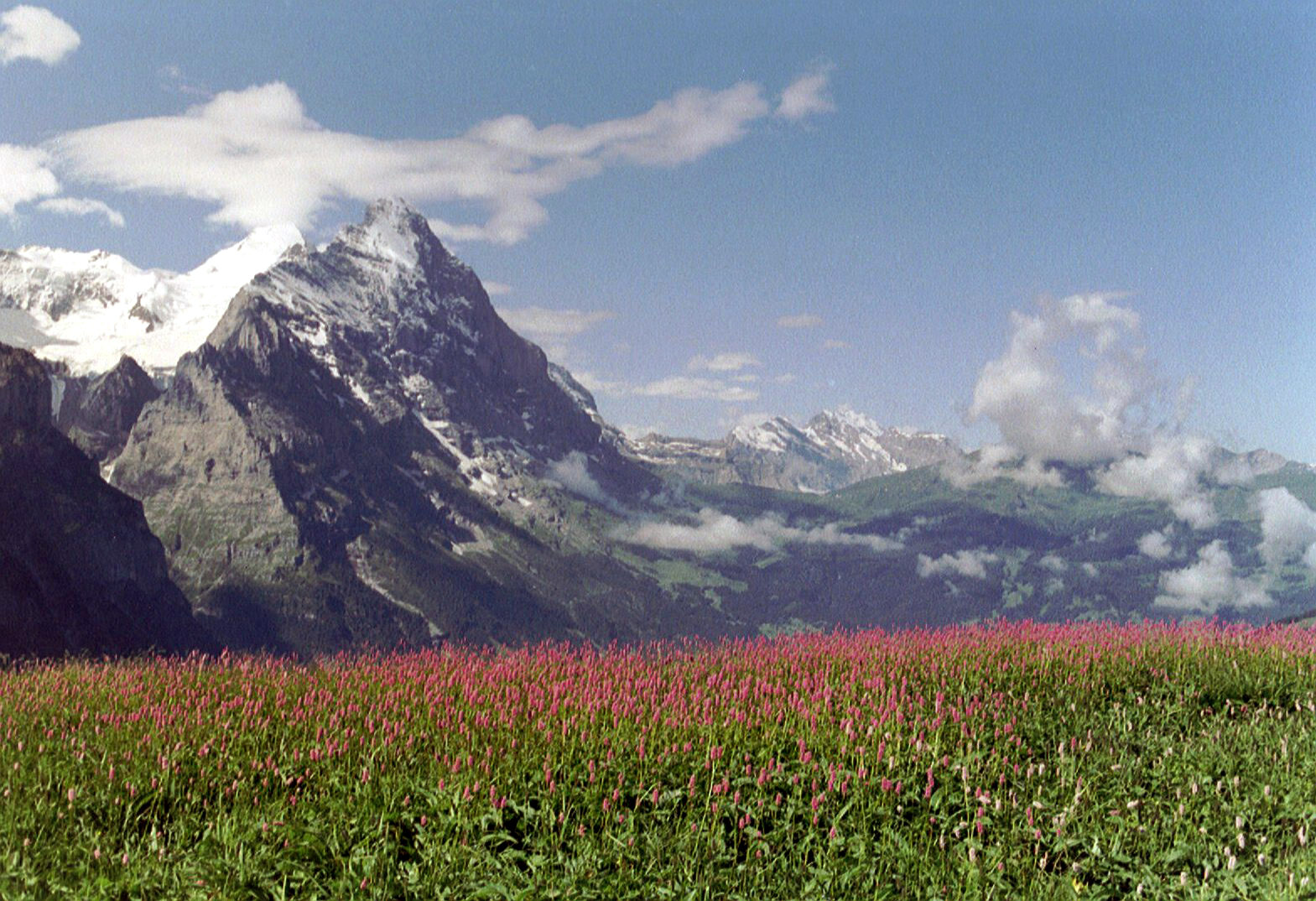
- View from Grosse Scheidegg towards the Eiger and Kleine Scheidegg

- Location within Switzerland
- Elevation: 1,962 metres (6,437 ft)
- Traversed by: Road (bus traffic only)

Third Approach
- Location: Bern, Switzerland
- Range: Alps
- Coordinates: 46°39.54′N 08°06.78′E

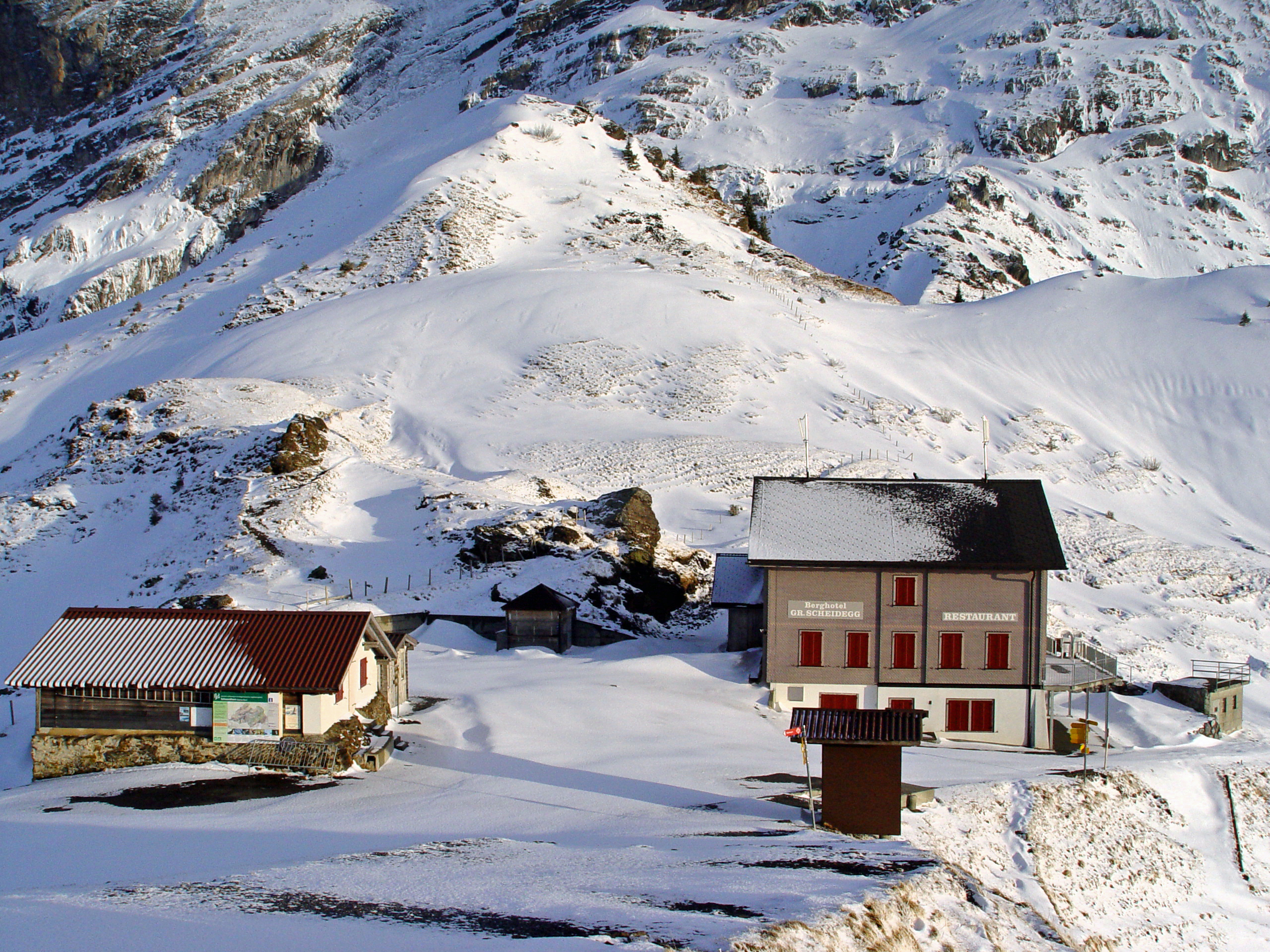
The summit of the Grosse Scheidegg in winter

The Grosse Scheidegg (Swiss Standard German pronunciation: [ˈɡroːsə ˈʃaɪdɛg]) is a mountain pass in the Bernese Alps of Switzerland, The pass crosses the col between the Schwarzhorn and the Wetterhorn mountains at an elevation of 1,962 m (6,437 ft).

The pass is traversed by a road connecting the town of Meiringen, at an elevation of 595 m (1,952 ft), with the village of Grindelwald, at an elevation of 1,034 m (3,392 ft). The road is closed to most traffic, but is used by a PostBus Switzerland service from Grindelwald to the summit of the pass, with some buses continuing to Meiringen. Bus services operate between May and October, with between four and ten buses a day depending on time of year and section of the route. Hiking over the pass is popular, and it forms part of the cross-country Alpine Pass Route between Sargans and Montreux.

From the Meiringen side, the approach to the pass runs through the valley of the Reichenbach stream above the Reichenbach Falls, best known as the place of the last fight between Holmes and Moriarty. The falls can be visited from the pass road, or by using the Reichenbachfall Funicular from the valley bottom.

The Berghotel, a restaurant and hotel, is situated at the summit of the Grosse Scheidegg.

Prior to the coming of the railways and the introduction of tourism to the area, the Grosse Scheidegg provided access for local livestock and dairy farmers to the important export route to Italy over the Grimsel Pass. With the coming of the railways, the importance of the pass as a trade route disappeared, and the pass never achieved the level of tourist visitors achieved by its neighbour, the Kleine Scheidegg.

== See also ==
- List of highest paved roads in Switzerland
- List of highest road passes in Switzerland
- List of mountain passes in Switzerland
