= Schwarzhorn (Bernese Alps) =

Mountain of the Bernese Alps

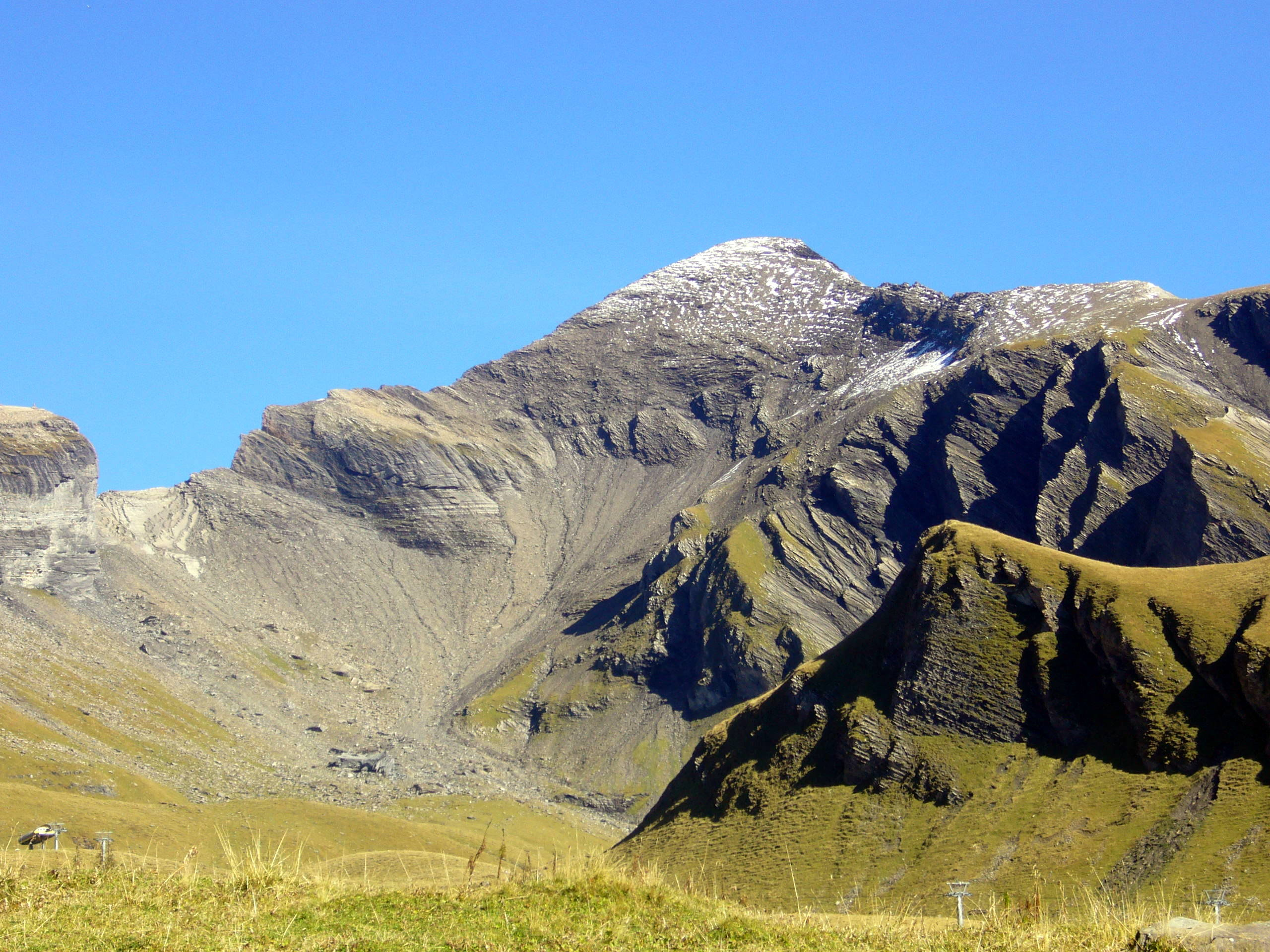
- View from First (south side)

Highest point
- Elevation: 2,928 m (9,606 ft)
- Prominence: 966 m (3,169 ft)
- Listing: Alpine mountains 2500-2999 m
- Coordinates: 46°41′10.7″N 8°04′32.4″E

Geography
- Location within Switzerland
- Location: Bern, Switzerland
- Parent range: Bernese Alps

The Schwarzhorn is a mountain of the Bernese Alps, located between Brienz and Grindelwald in the Bernese Oberland. With a height of 2,928 metres above sea level, it is the highest summit of the group north of the Grosse Scheidegg Pass. The Schwarzhorn is also the highest point in the municipality of Brienz.

A small glacier named Blau Gletscherli lies on the north side of the mountain.

The Schwarzhorn is regarded as one of the most stunning look-out peaks in the Bernese Oberland. Its summit can be accessed by a trail on the southern ridge.
