= Lordship of Wolhusen =

Former lordship in Lucerne, Switzerland

Lordship of Wolhusen Herrschaft Wolhusen
- Lordship of the Holy Roman Empire
- Capital: Wolhusen

The Lordship of Wolhusen (German: Herrschaft Wolhusen) was a lordship and later an office (Amt) in what is now the canton of Lucerne, Switzerland. It formed from the possessions of the barons (Freiherren) of Wolhusen, whose center of power in the 12th and 13th centuries lay at the crossing of the Emme near Wolhusen, and extended over the Entlebuch and parts of the Swiss Plateau. Around 1234 the family split into an elder line at the inner castle and a younger line at the outer castle of Wolhusen. At the end of the 13th century the elder line sold the inner castle, the market of Wolhusen and the Entlebuch to the Habsburgs; in 1313 the younger line converted its lordship into a Habsburg fief, which the Habsburgs took back in 1369. Lucerne took over the lordship by conquest in 1386 and by treaty in 1394.

== History ==
The lordship of Wolhusen formed from the possessions of the barons of Wolhusen. The dynasties and their possessions can be traced only late. Estates of the first known member, Seliger, point to an early center of power on the Swiss Plateau (Mittelland) around Ettiswil. In the 12th and 13th centuries the center of the lordship can be traced at the crossing of the Emme near Wolhusen, from where the barons expanded toward the Entlebuch and the Plateau. They also held the comital rights (Grafschaftsrechte).

In the upper Entlebuch (the upper office), the barons displaced the lords of Lützelflüh, Sumiswald and Trachselwald from their positions in Escholzmatt and Marbach in the 12th century. There they held the low and high courts, serfs (Eigenleute) and Escholzmatt Castle (probably built by lords from the Emmental), but hardly any landed property. In the parish of Trub they exercised the high and low jurisdiction, and in Schangnau the high jurisdiction. In the lower office they held the church patronage rights (Kirchensätze) of Schüpfheim and Entlebuch, each linked with a pulpit court (Kanzelgericht), as well as the churches of Hasle and Romoos. The pulpit courts were a peculiarity of the lordship of Wolhusen: the barons had given the rectors (Kirchherren) in the offices of Entlebuch and Wolhusen and in Grossdietwil the powers of a local lord (jurisdiction over adultery, the fields, and measures and weights). In Hasle, Romoos, Doppleschwand and Wolhusen-Markt the barons exercised the high jurisdiction and the jurisdiction over debts. In the high forest (Hochwald) all rights belonged to the lordship of Wolhusen as a whole. In the 12th century the barons gave estates and the right of collation in Entlebuch to St. Blasien Abbey in the Black Forest, but later took the right of collation back.

On the Plateau the office (Amt) of Wolhusen comprised the high court and the court for rent charges (Gültengericht) in the parishes of Ruswil, Buttisholz, Grossdietwil, Grosswangen and Geiss, as well as serfs in the high-court district of Willisau, estates in the parish of Ruswil and the stronghold of Grosswangen. In Unterwalden, as advocates (Kastvögte) of the monastery of Lucerne, the barons held rights of use, rents and rent charges (Gülten). Their recorded ministeriales included the families von Kapfenberg and von Bergstoss, the stewards (Truchsessen) of Wolhusen, the Rust family and the von Rüediswil family.

Ruins of the outer castle of Wolhusen (Wolhusen-Wiggern)

Around 1223, after the death of the last member of the Wolhusen family, a branch of the barons of Rotenburg, who were related to them by marriage, continued the family under the old name. This branch split around 1234 into an elder line at the inner castle and a younger line at the outer castle of Wolhusen. The high court remained with the elder line, together with the lordship over the Entlebuch and Grosswangen. The younger line took over essentially the area of the later office of Ruswil and Escholzmatt Castle. The rights of the two lines, however, were territorially intermixed. At the end of the 13th century the elder line sold the inner castle and the market of Wolhusen, together with the Entlebuch, to the Habsburgs and withdrew to Grosswangen Castle (with the patronage of Grossdietwil), which probably became an Austrian fief in the 14th century. In 1313 the younger line had its lordship with the outer castle (Wolhusen-Wiggern) converted into a Habsburg fief. The last holders of this fief were Margarethe von Wolhusen and her husband Imer von Strassberg. After their death the Habsburgs took the fief back in 1369 under a repurchase clause. The Inner Office (Inneres Amt) of Wolhusen was a Habsburg bailiwick (Landvogtei) from 1313, and the Outer Office (Äusseres Amt) from 1370.

Before 1350 the Entlebuch and the inner castle were pledged as a bailiwick to Peter von Thorberg; they were redeemed in 1358. In 1363 Peter von Grünenberg acquired the Inner Office as a pledge, and in 1370 the whole Wolhusen complex became a lordship pledged to Thorberg. In 1386 the lordship of Wolhusen, together with that of Grosswangen, passed to Lucerne de facto by conquest, and in 1394 by treaty. In 1405 Lucerne acquired the lordship as an Austrian pledge, and in 1415 it became an imperial fief. In 1419 a Lucerne office of Wolhusen briefly appears (probably Wolhusen-Wiggern with Menznau); it was absorbed into the bailiwick of Ruswil.

== Bibliography ==
- F. Glauser, J. J. Siegrist, Die Luzerner Pfarreien und Landvogteien, 1977
- A. Bickel, Willisau, 2 vols., 1982
- G. P. Marchal, Sempach 1386, 1986
- F. Glauser, "Das Entlebuch im Mittelalter", in Der Geschichtsfreund 142, 1989, pp. 49–66
