= Escholzmatt-Marbach =

- Municipality
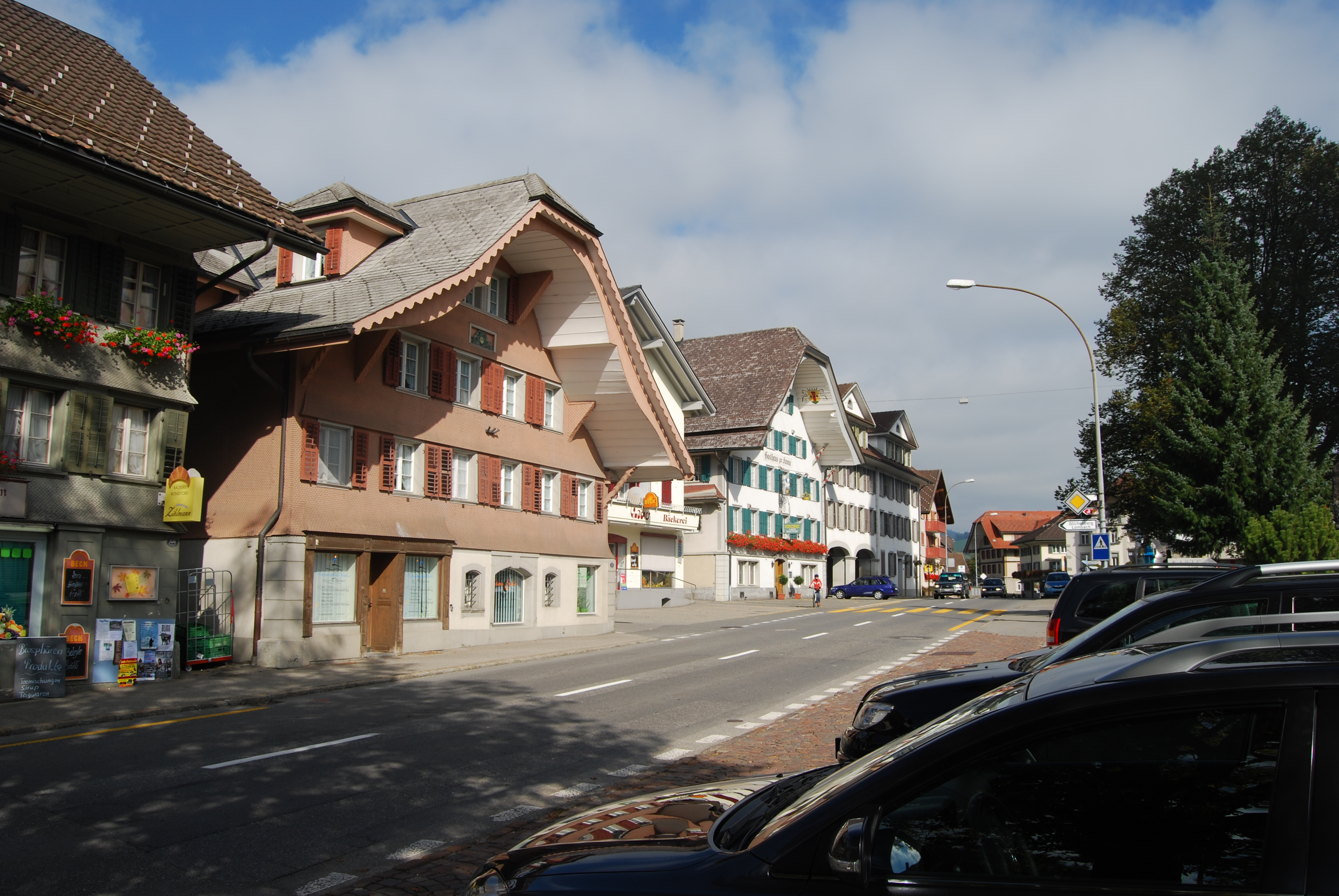
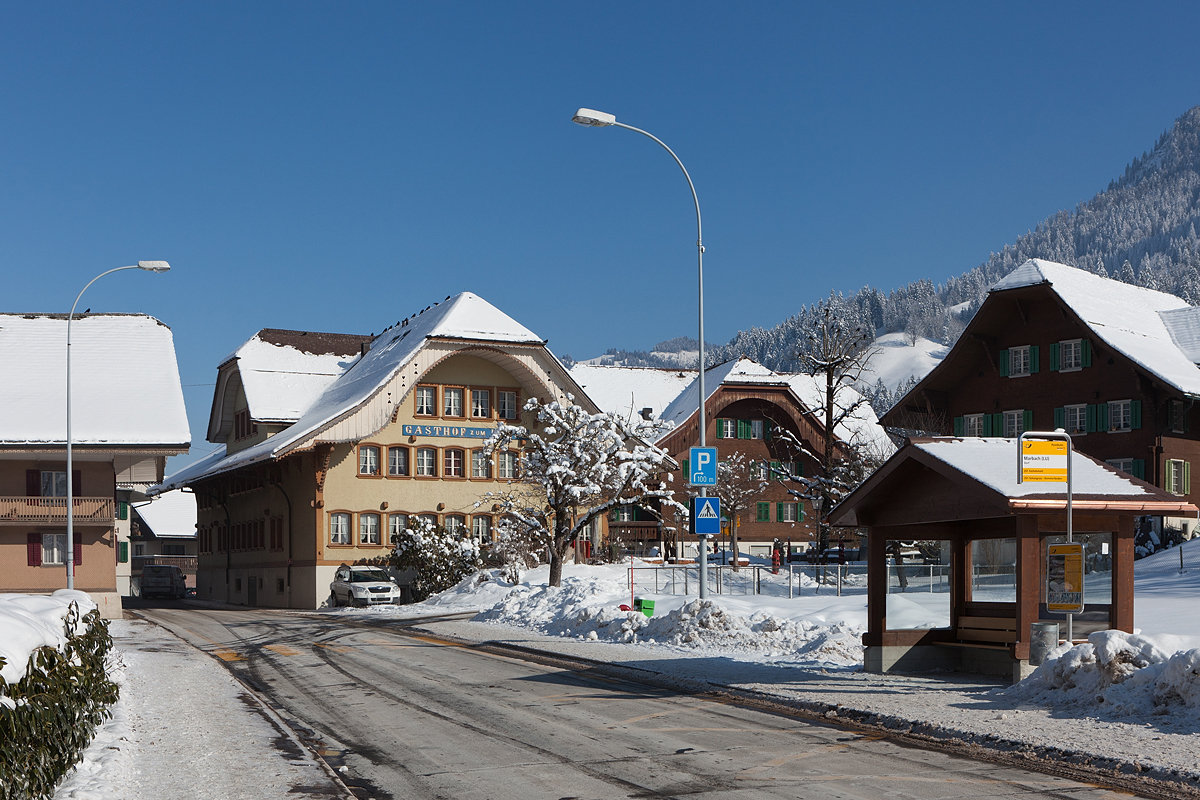
- Escholzmatt village Marbach village

- Flag Coat of arms
- Location of Escholzmatt-Marbach
- Location within Switzerland Location within Canton of Lucerne
- Coordinates: 46°55′N 7°56′E
- Country: Switzerland
- Canton: Lucerne
- District: Entlebuch

Area
  - Total: 106.37 km^{2} (41.07 sq mi)
- Elevation: 852 m (2,795 ft)

Population (Dec 2011)
  - Total: 4,355
  - Density: 40.94/km^{2} (106.0/sq mi)
- Time zone: UTC+01:00 (CET)
  - Summer (DST): UTC+02:00 (CEST)
- Postal code: 6182
- SFOS number: 1010
- ISO 3166 code: CH-LU
- Surrounded by: Flühli, Romoos, Schüpfheim, Trub (BE)
- Website: www.escholzmatt.ch

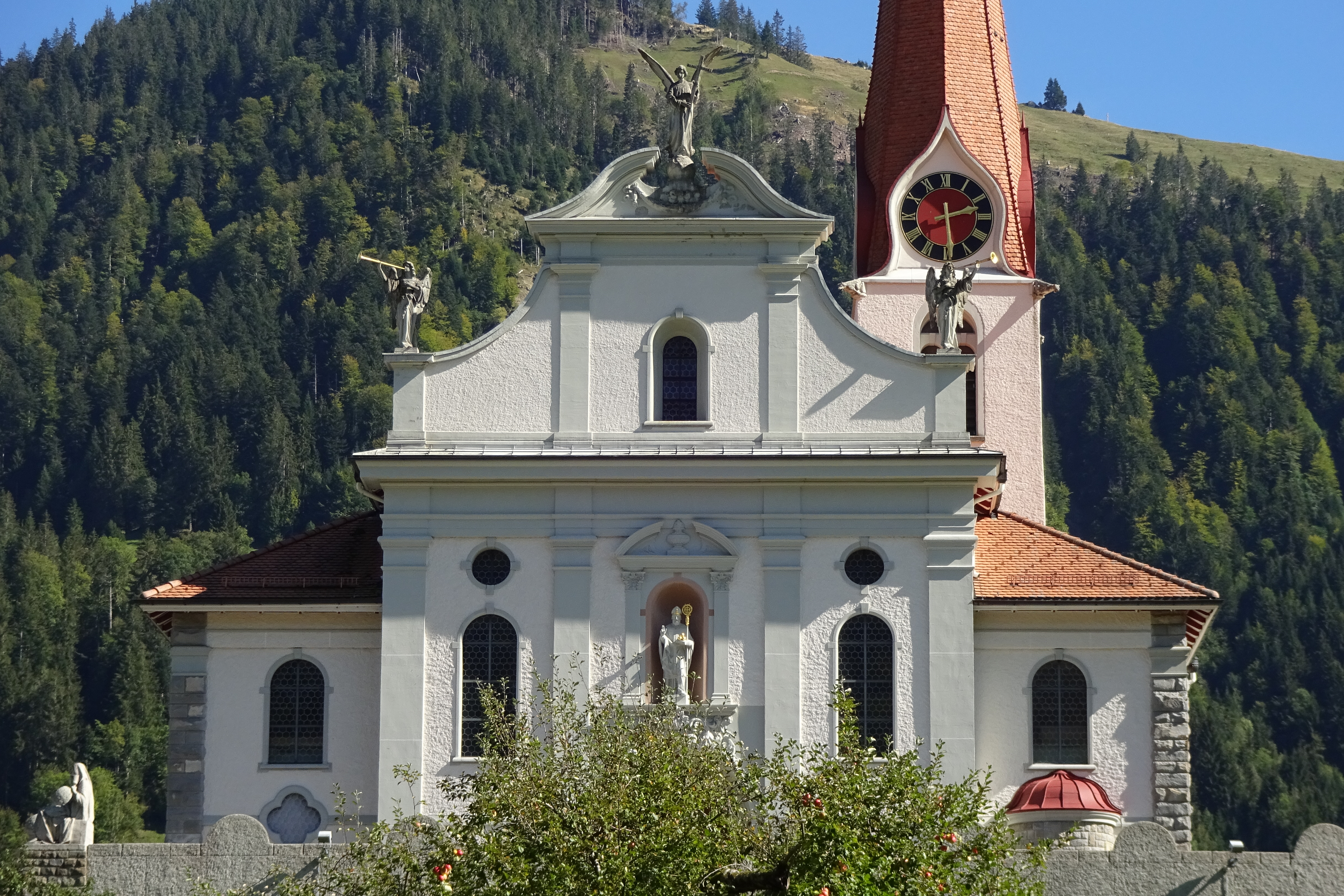
Marbach : Parish Church of Saint Nicholas - façade

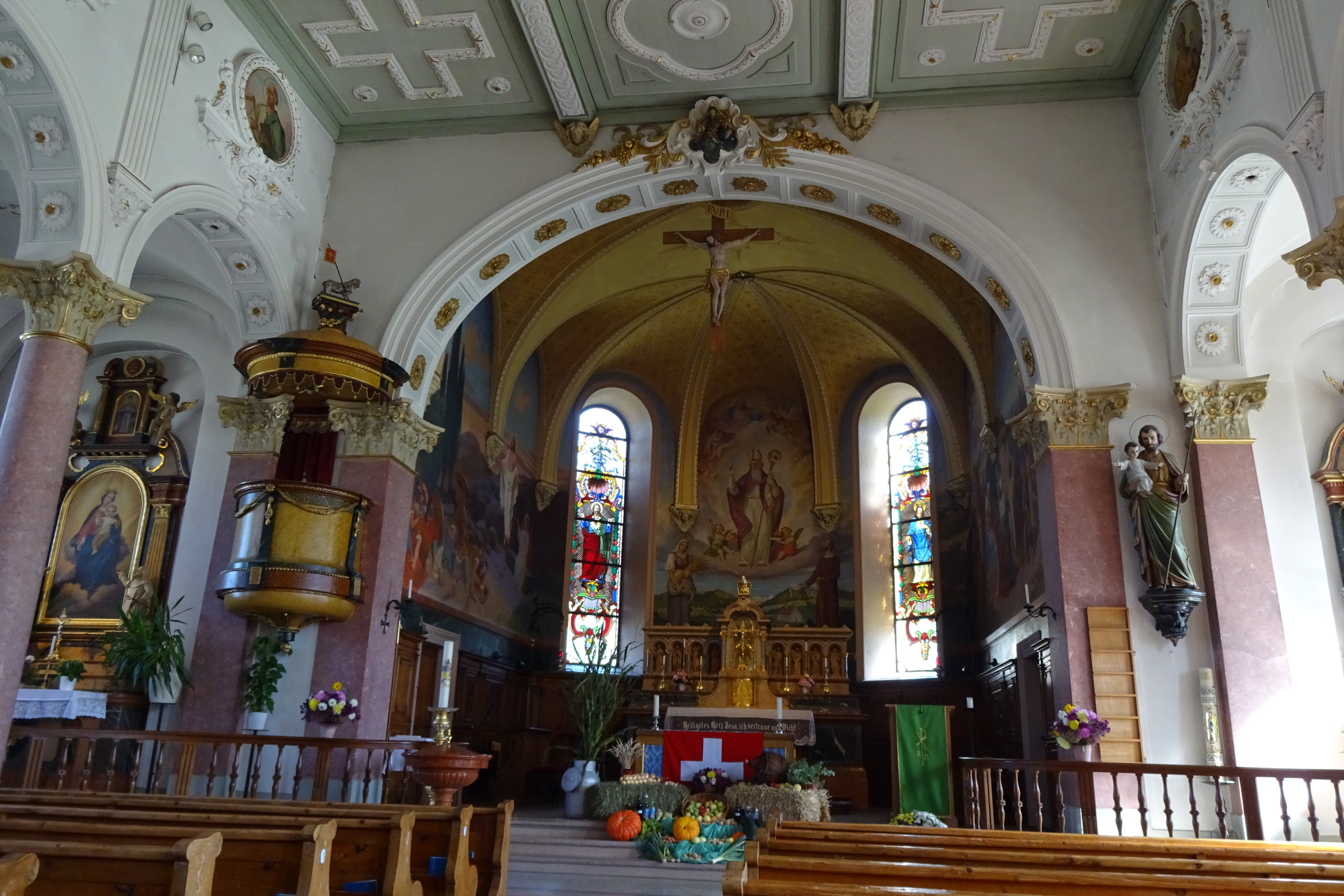
Marbach : Parish Church of Saint Nicholas - interior view

Escholzmatt-Marbach is a municipality in the district of Entlebuch in the canton of Lucerne in Switzerland. On 1 January 2013 the former municipalities of Escholzmatt and Marbach merged to form the new municipality of Escholzmatt-Marbach.

== History ==
Escholzmatt is first mentioned in 1160 as Askolvismatte. In 1240 it was mentioned as Askoltispach and Asholtismate, in 1275 it was mentioned as Aeschelsmat. Marbach is first mentioned in 1306 as Marpach.

== Geography ==
The former municipalities that now make up Escholzmatt-Marbach have a total combined area of 106.4 km^{2} (41.08 sq mi).

Escholzmatt had an area of 61.3 km^{2} (23.7 sq mi). Of this area, 50% is used for agricultural purposes, while 44.1% is forested. Of the rest of the land, 3.1% is settled (buildings or roads) and the remainder (2.7%) is non-productive (rivers, glaciers or mountains). The former municipality is located on the watershed between the Grosse and Kleine Emme rivers. The lowest elevation in the municipality is 753 m (2,470 ft) while the highest is 2,090 m (6,860 ft) on the Schrattenfluh by Hengst. It consists of the village of Escholzmatt and the hamlets of Lehn, Feldmoos, Wiggen, and Dürrenbach.

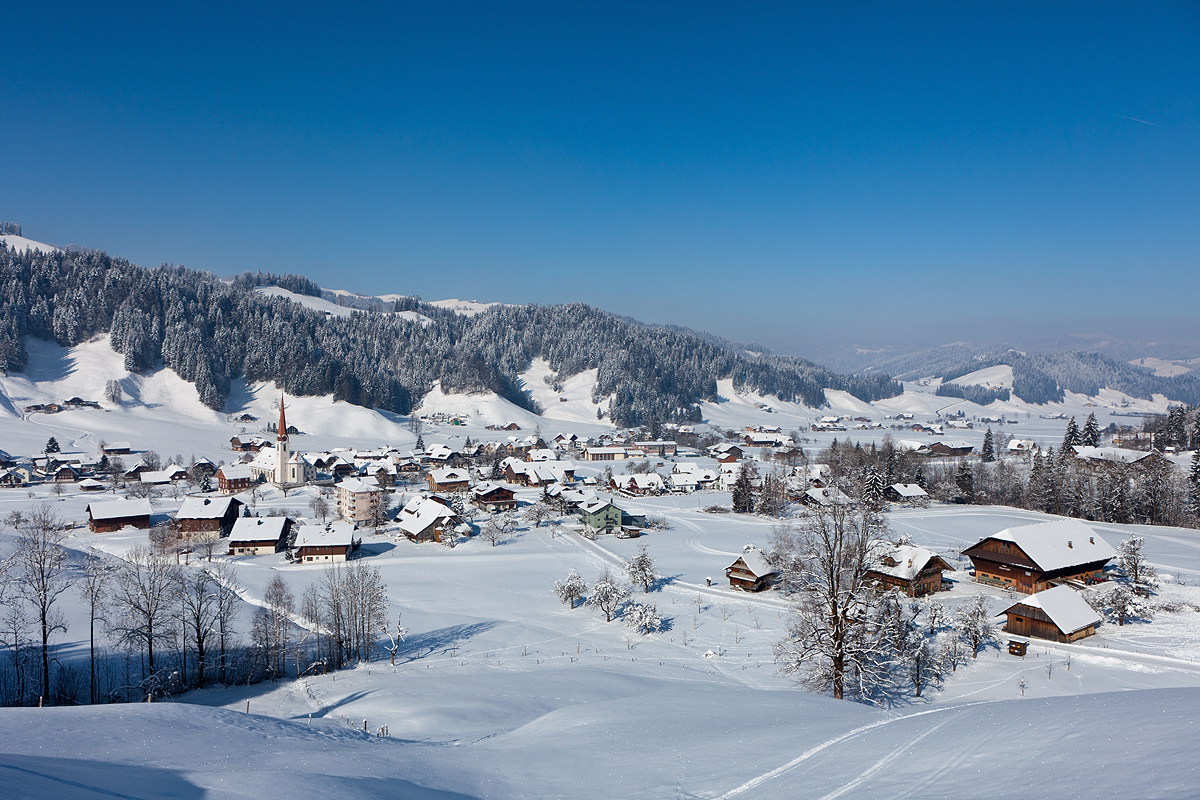
Marbach village and the surrounding mountains

Marbach had an area of 45.1 km^{2} (17.4 sq mi). Of this area, 45.3% is used for agricultural purposes, while 47.4% is forested. Of the rest of the land, 2.6% is settled (buildings or roads) and the remainder (4.7%) is non-productive (rivers, glaciers or mountains). The former municipality is located in the southwest corner of the Canton.

== Demographics ==
The total population of Escholzmatt-Marbach (as of December 2020) is 4,349.

== Historic population ==
The historical population is given in the following chart:

== Weather ==
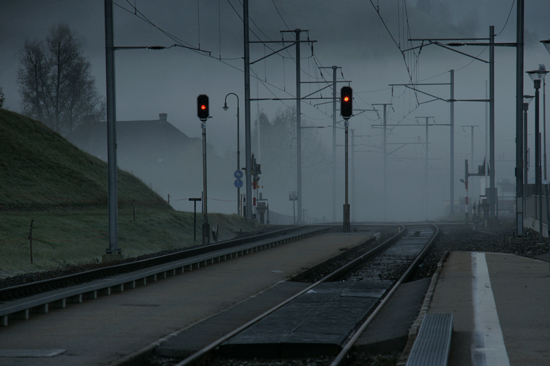
Escholzmatt train station in the fog.

Escholzmatt has an average of 153 days of rain per year and on average receives 1,424 mm (56.1 in) of precipitation. The wettest month is June during which time Escholzmatt receives an average of 172 mm (6.8 in) of precipitation. During this month there is precipitation for an average of 15.1 days. The month with the most days of precipitation is May, with an average of 15.5, but with only 150 mm (5.9 in) of precipitation. The driest month of the year is February with an average of 85 mm (3.3 in) of precipitation over 15.1 days.

Marbach has an average of 162.3 days of rain per year and on average receives 1,760 mm (69 in) of precipitation. The wettest month is June during which time Marbach receives an average of 218 mm (8.6 in) of precipitation. During this month there is precipitation for an average of 16.4 days. The month with the most days of precipitation is May, with an average of 16.9, but with only 179 mm (7.0 in) of precipitation. The driest month of the year is February with an average of 112 mm (4.4 in) of precipitation over 16.4 days.
