= Hasle, Lucerne =

Hasle
- Municipality
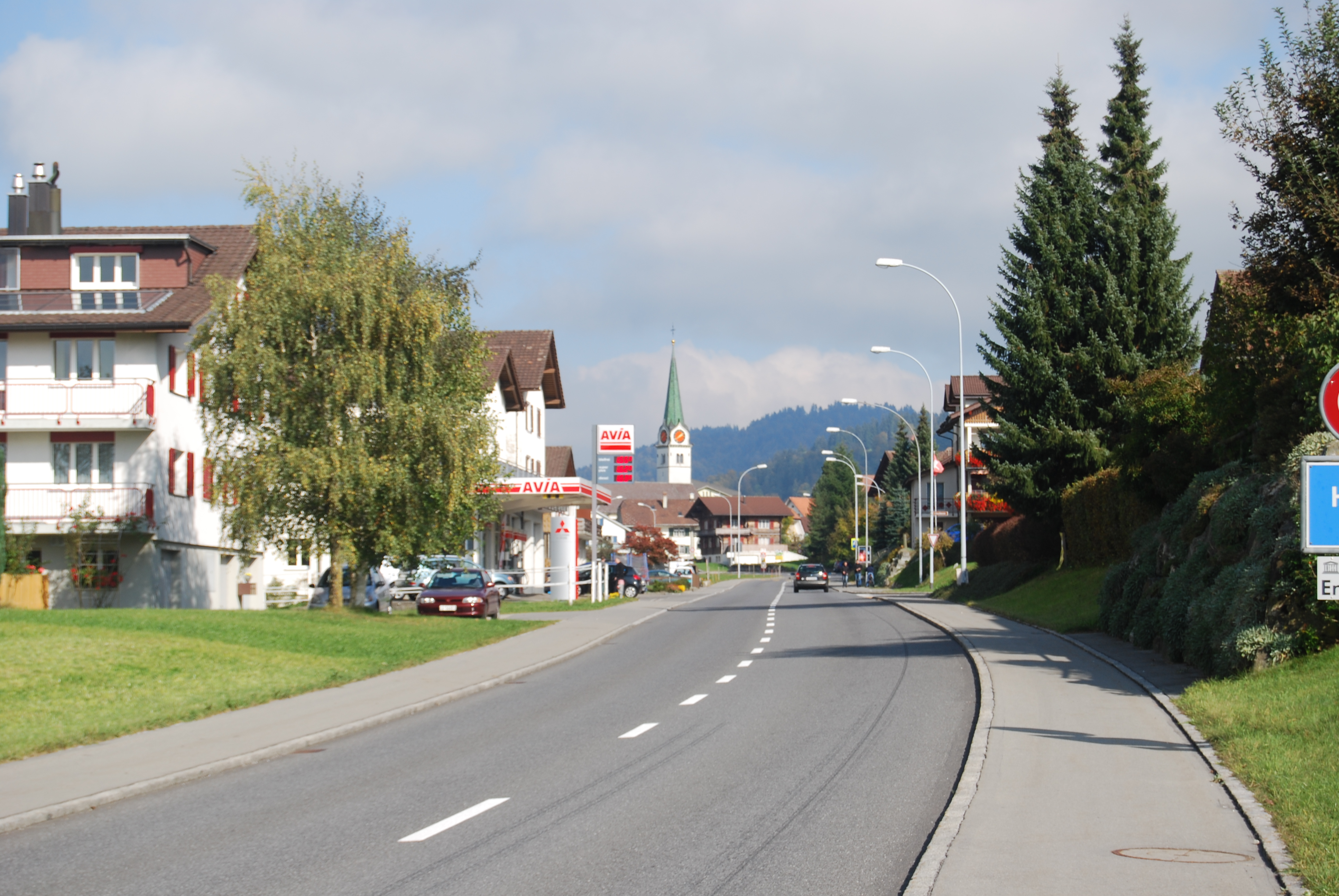

- Coat of arms
- Location of Hasle
- Location within Switzerland Location within Canton of Lucerne
- Coordinates: 46°59′N 8°3′E
- Country: Switzerland
- Canton: Lucerne
- District: Entlebuch

Area
  - Total: 40.30 km^{2} (15.56 sq mi)
- Elevation: 718 m (2,356 ft)

Population (December 2020)
  - Total: 1,739
  - Density: 43.15/km^{2} (111.8/sq mi)
- Time zone: UTC+01:00 (CET)
  - Summer (DST): UTC+02:00 (CEST)
- Postal code: 6166
- SFOS number: 1005
- ISO 3166 code: CH-LU
- Surrounded by: Doppleschwand, Entlebuch, Flühli, Romoos, Sarnen (OW), Schüpfheim
- Website: www.hasle-lu.ch

Hasle is a municipality in the district of Entlebuch in the canton of Lucerne in Switzerland. Hasle is part of the UNESCO Entlebuch Biosphere Reserve since 2001.

== History ==
Hasle is first mentioned in 1236 as Hasile in a letter by Pope Gregory IX to the monastery of Engelberg. Along with other places of the Entlebuch valley, Hasle was brought into the sphere of influence of the city of Lucerne as from 1385. In 1653 the rebellious forces of the Swiss Peasant War gathered at Heiligkreuz above the Hasle in order to swear an oath of allegiance.

== Geography ==
Aerial view by Walter Mittelholzer (1922)

Hasle has an area of 40.3 km^{2} (15.6 sq mi). Of this area, 50.6% is used for agricultural purposes, while 39.6% is forested. Of the rest of the land, 2.9% is settled (buildings or roads) and the remainder (6.9%) is non-productive (rivers, glaciers or mountains). In the 1997 land survey, 39.58% of the total land area was forested. Of the agricultural land, 50.12% is used for farming or pastures, while 0.5% is used for orchards or vine crops. Of the settled areas, 0.87% is covered with buildings, 0.05% is industrial, 0.22% is classed as special developments, 0.12% is parks or greenbelts and 1.59% is transportation infrastructure. Of the unproductive areas, 1.24% is unproductive flowing water (rivers) and 5.71% is other unproductive land.

The municipality is located on the both banks of the Kleine Emme. It consists of the linear village of Hasle and the place of pilgrimage/ski resort of Heiligkreuz on the east side of the Emme. On the western side of the river are the hamlets of Habschwanden and Änetegg.

== Demographics ==
Hasle has a population (as of 31 December 2020) of 1,739. As of 2007, 1.2% of the population was made up of foreign nationals. Over the last 10 years the population has decreased at a rate of -5.1%. Most of the population (as of 2000) speaks German (96.4%), with Albanian being second most common ( 1.9%) and Italian being third ( 0.5%).

In the 2007 election the most popular party was the CVP which received 47.5% of the vote. The next three most popular parties were the SVP (33%), the FDP (13%) and the SPS (4.2%).

The age distribution in Hasle is; 485 people or 28.4% of the population is 0–19 years old. 406 people or 23.8% are 20–39 years old, and 541 people or 31.7% are 40–64 years old. The senior population distribution is 209 people or 12.2% are 65–79 years old, 65 or 3.8% are 80–89 years old and 3 people or 0.2% of the population are 90+ years old.

62.5% of the population (between age 25-64) have completed either non-mandatory upper secondary education or additional higher education (either university or a Fachhochschule).

As of 2000 there are 583 households, 132 of which (about 22.6%) contain only a single individual. 105 or about 18.0% are large households, with at least five members. As of 2000 there were 384 inhabited buildings in the municipality, of which 211 were built only as housing, and 173 were mixed use buildings. There were 142 single family homes, 43 double family homes, and 26 multi-family homes in the municipality. Most homes were either two (140) or three (45) story structures. There were only 14 single story buildings and 12 four or more story buildings.

Hasle has an unemployment rate of 0.76%. As of 2005, there were 299 people employed in the primary economic sector and about 94 businesses involved in this sector. 285 people are employed in the secondary sector and there are 17 businesses in this sector. 221 people are employed in the tertiary sector, with 44 businesses in this sector. As of 2000 49.3% of the population of the municipality were employed in some capacity. At the same time, females made up 38.1% of the workforce.

According to a census in the year 2000, religious affiliations of the population were as follows: 1,593 inhabitants (93.7%) were Roman Catholic; 54 (3.2%) were Protestant; 8 (0.47%) were of some other Christian faith; 18 (1.06% of the population) were Muslim; 17 (1.0%) did not belong to any organized religion.

The historical population is given in the following table:

year	population
1650	520
1745	1,007
1837	1,626
1850	1,567
1900	1,294
1950	1,535
2000	1,701
2008	1,709
