= Escholzmatt =

- Former municipality
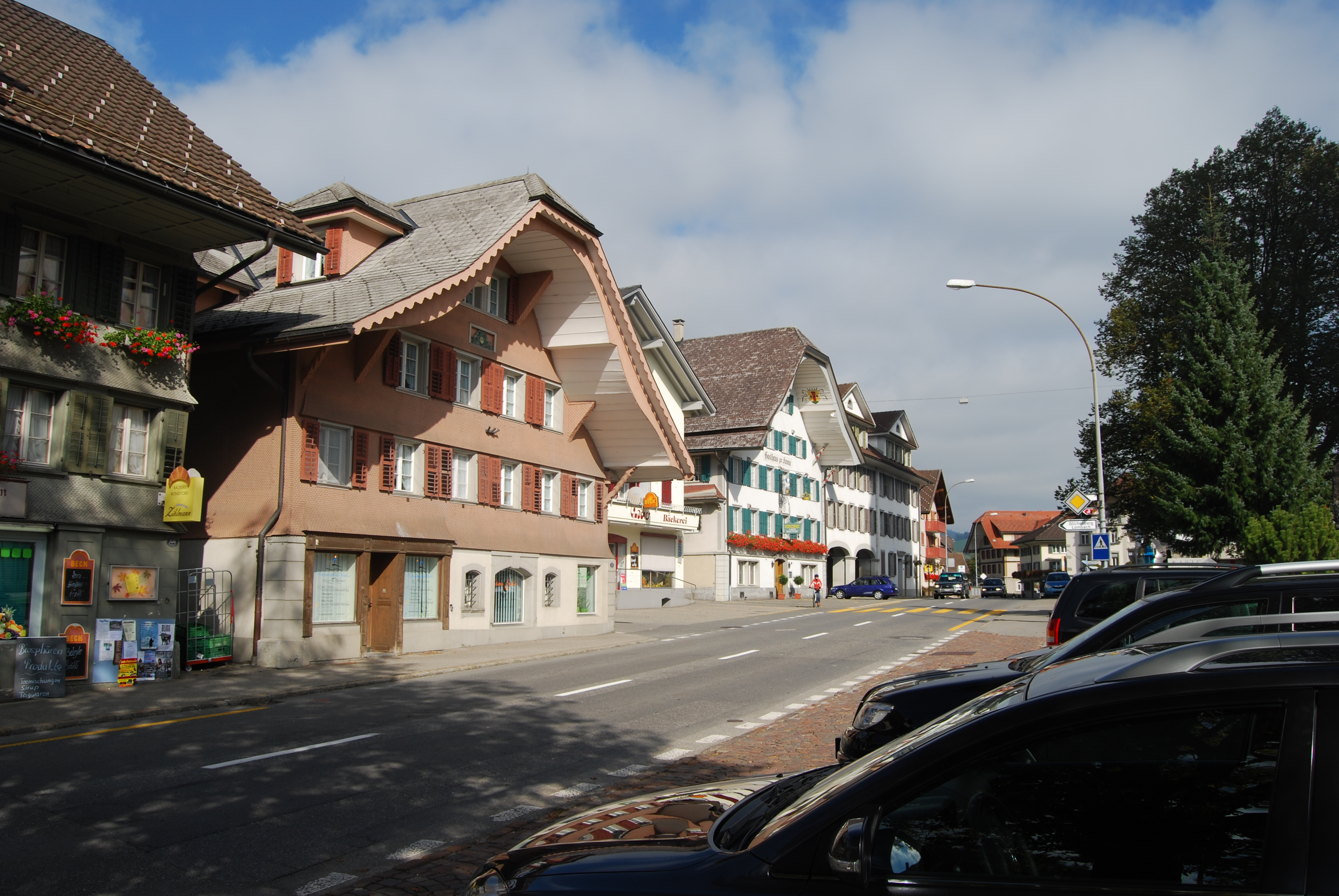

- Flag Coat of arms
- Location of Escholzmatt
- Location within Switzerland Location within Canton of Lucerne
- Coordinates: 46°55′N 7°56′E
- Country: Switzerland
- Canton: Lucerne
- District: Entlebuch

Area
  - Total: 61.29 km^{2} (23.66 sq mi)
- Elevation: 852 m (2,795 ft)

Population (Dec 2011)
  - Total: 3,138
  - Density: 51.20/km^{2} (132.6/sq mi)
- Time zone: UTC+01:00 (CET)
  - Summer (DST): UTC+02:00 (CEST)
- Postal code: 6182
- SFOS number: 1003
- ISO 3166 code: CH-LU
- Surrounded by: Flühli, Marbach, Romoos, Schüpfheim, Trub (BE)
- Website: www.escholzmatt.ch

Escholzmatt (German pronunciation: [ˈɛʃɔltsmat]) is a former municipality in the district of Entlebuch in the canton of Lucerne in Switzerland. Escholzmatt was the Canton's second largest municipality in terms of area. It is part of the UNESCO Entlebuch Biosphere Reserve since 2001. On 1 January 2013 the former municipalities of Escholzmatt and Marbach merged to form the new municipality of Escholzmatt-Marbach.

== History ==
Escholzmatt is first mentioned in 1160 as Askolvismatte. In 1240 it was mentioned as Askoltispach and Asholtismate, in 1275 it was mentioned as Aeschelsmat.

== Geography ==
Aerial view from 500 m by Walter Mittelholzer (1922)

Escholzmatt had an area of 61.3 km^{2} (23.7 sq mi). Of this area, 50% is used for agricultural purposes, while 44.1% is forested. Of the rest of the land, 3.1% is settled (buildings or roads) and the remainder (2.7%) is non-productive (rivers, glaciers or mountains). In the 1997 land survey, 44.24% of the total land area was forested. Of the agricultural land, 49.67% is used for farming or pastures, while 0.26% is used for orchards or vine crops. Of the settled areas, 1.4% is covered with buildings, 0.13% is industrial, 0.15% is classed as special developments, 0.07% is parks or greenbelts and 1.38% is transportation infrastructure. Of the unproductive areas, 0.63% is unproductive flowing water (rivers) and 2.07% is other unproductive land.

The former municipality is located on the watershed between the Grosse and Kleine Emme rivers. The lowest elevation in the municipality is 753 m (2,470 ft) while the highest is 2,090 m (6,860 ft) on the Schrattenfluh by Hengst. It consists of the village of Escholzmatt and the hamlets of Lehn, Feldmoos, Wiggen, and Dürrenbach.

== Demographics ==
Escholzmatt has a population (as of 2011) of 3138. As of 2007, 5.7% of the population was made up of foreign nationals. Over the last 10 years the population has decreased at a rate of -6.2%. Most of the population (as of 2000) speaks German (95.0%), with Albanian being second most common ( 1.7%) and Serbo-Croatian being third ( 1.0%).

In the 2007 election the most popular party was the CVP which received 46.3% of the vote. The next three most popular parties were the SVP (33.7%), the FDP (14.2%) and the Green Party (2.7%).

The age distribution in Escholzmatt is; 823 people or 26.2% of the population is 0–19 years old. 793 people or 25.2% are 20–39 years old, and 991 people or 31.6% are 40–64 years old. The senior population distribution is 369 people or 11.7% are 65–79 years old, 147 or 4.7% are 80–89 years old and 18 people or 0.6% of the population are 90+ years old.

The entire Swiss population is generally well educated. In Escholzmatt about 53.8% of the population (between age 25-64) have completed either non-mandatory upper secondary education or additional higher education (either university or a Fachhochschule). As of 2000 there are 1,133 households, of which 342 households (or about 30.2%) contain only a single individual. 200 or about 17.7% are large households, with at least five members. As of 2000 there were 667 inhabited buildings in the municipality, of which 311 were built only as housing, and 356 were mixed use buildings. There were 183 single family homes, 75 double family homes, and 53 multi-family homes in the municipality. Most homes were either two (173) or three (98) story structures. There were only 14 single story buildings and 26 four or more story buildings.

Escholzmatt has an unemployment rate of 1.07%. As of 2005, there were 564 people employed in the primary economic sector and about 230 businesses involved in this sector. 566 people are employed in the secondary sector and there are 33 businesses in this sector. 410 people are employed in the tertiary sector, with 71 businesses in this sector. As of 2000 46.6% of the population of the municipality were employed in some capacity. At the same time, females made up 38.8% of the workforce.

In the 2000 census the religious membership of Escholzmatt was; 2,532 (78.4%) were Roman Catholic, and 354 (11.%) were Protestant, with an additional 49 (1.52%) that were of some other Christian faith. There are 79 individuals (2.45% of the population) who are Muslim. Of the rest; there were 37 (1.15%) individuals who belong to another religion, 53 (1.64%) who do not belong to any organized religion, 125 (3.87%) who did not answer the question.

The historical population is given in the following table:

year	population
1650	c900
1850	3,348
1900	3,127
1950	3,509
2000	3,229

== Weather ==
Escholzmatt has an average of 153 days of rain per year and on average receives 1,424 mm (56.1 in) of precipitation. The wettest month is June during which time Escholzmatt receives an average of 172 mm (6.8 in) of precipitation. During this month there is precipitation for an average of 15.1 days. The month with the most days of precipitation is May, with an average of 15.5, but with only 150 mm (5.9 in) of precipitation. The driest month of the year is February with an average of 85 mm (3.3 in) of precipitation over 15.1 days.

== See also ==
- In 2004, the township of Escholzmatt appointed Hugo Loetscher a Citoyen d'honneur.
