= Entlebuch District =

Coordinates: 46°56′N 8°0′E

Entlebuch District Wahlkreis Entlebuch
- District
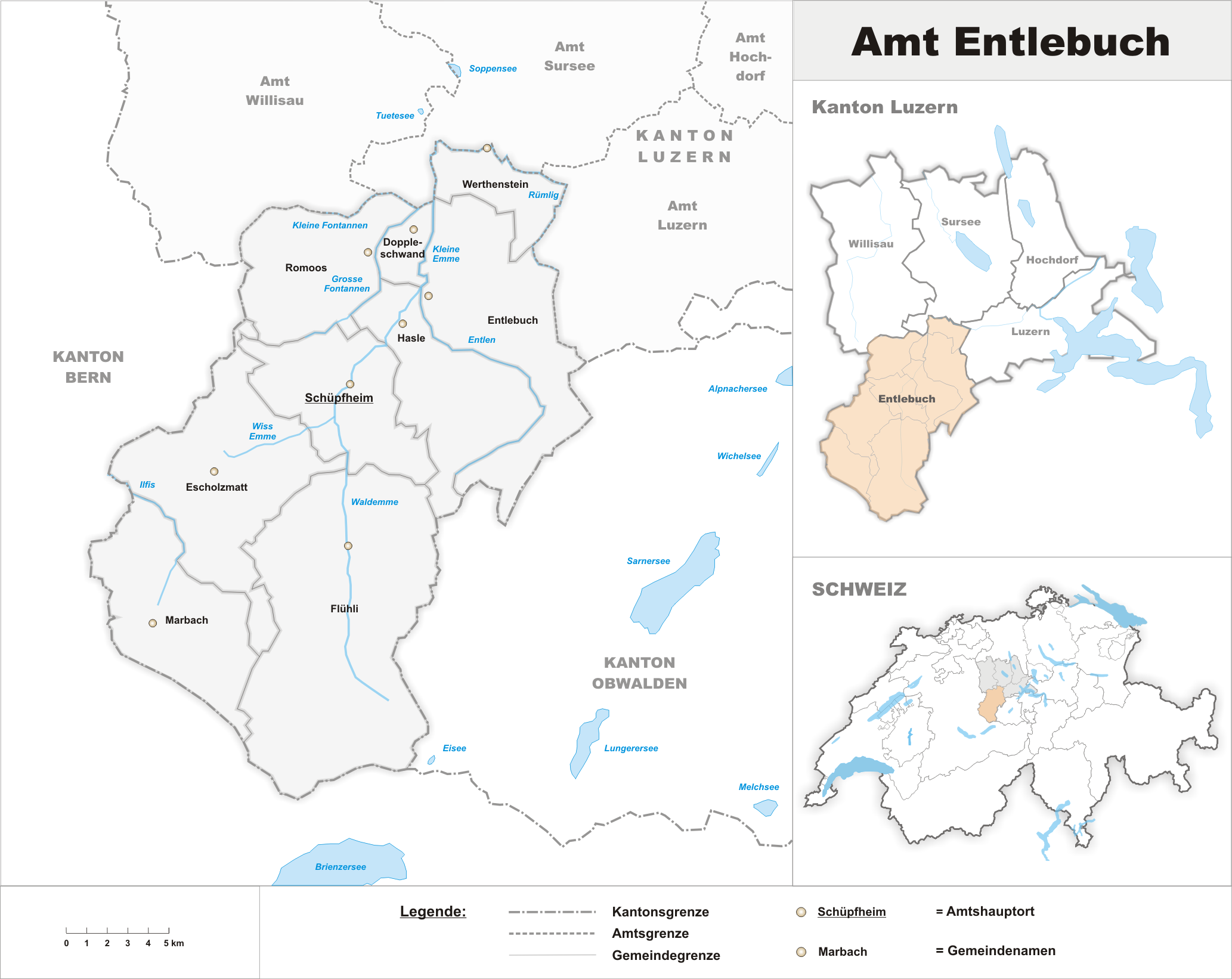
- Country: Switzerland
- Canton: Luzern
- Capital: Schüpfheim

Area
  - Total: 424.43 km^{2} (163.87 sq mi)

Population (2020)
  - Total: 23,303
  - Density: 54.904/km^{2} (142.20/sq mi)
- Time zone: UTC+1 (CET)
  - Summer (DST): UTC+2 (CEST)
- Municipalities: 9

Entlebuch District is one of six districts (German: Wahlkreise) of the canton of Lucerne, Switzerland. Its administrative center is the village of Schüpfheim. Entlebuch District roughly corresponds to the basin of the river Kleine Emme. The district receives its name from the village of Entlebuch, which is in turn named for the rivers Grosse and Kleine Entle, a right tributary of Kleine Emme.

From 1803 to 2013, it was known as Amt Entlebuch, one of five districts (Ämter) of the canton. It corresponds to the basin of the river Kleine Emme, which had been a territory of the canton of Lucerne de facto since 1385, de jure since 1405.

== History ==
Its area of 395 km² is roughly equivalent to that of the historical bailiwick of Entlebuch, first mentioned in the 12th century. The bailiwick was owned by the lords of Wolhusen in the 13th century, and passed to the House of Habsburg shortly before 1300. In the 1370s, Entlebuch was in conflict with Obwalden over the right to alpine pastures, culminating in the Battle of Sörenberg in 1380. As a result of the conflict, the Entlebuch sought an alliance with the city of Lucerne and in 1385 became a subject territory of that city. After the Battle of Sempach in 1405, when a central Swiss alliance fought an army of House Habsburg, the contract of 1385 was de jure certified. Territorial conflicts with Bern were resolved with a treaty in 1470.

Historically characterised by dispersed settlement, villages formed around churches as from the 16th century. The local population revolted repeatedly against the rule of Lucerne during the 15th to 17th century, most notably the Amstaldenhandel (1478), the Zwiebelnkrieg (1513) and the finally the Swiss Peasant War of 1653.

The modern Amt (district) Entlebuch was established in 1803 as a consequence of the restructuring of Switzerland after the dissolution of the Helvetic Republic. Werthenstein was incorporated to the district only in 1889.

The bailiwick had 2,260 inhabitants in 1453, and 5,377 in 1715. Population grew significantly in the later 18th century due to industrialisation, recorded at 12,182 as of 1795. At the height of industrialisation, population was close to 17,000 in 1850.

The region was long known as the "poorhouse of Switzerland" (also as the "Wild West of Lucerne") and is struggling for economic independence even today.

In 2001 UNESCO accepted the region of Entlebuch to become part of the World Network of Biosphere Reserves, in which conservation of the natural and cultural landscape is coupled with strengthening the local economy.

== Municipalities ==
Entlebuch consists of the following municipalities:

Municipality	Population (31 December 2020)	Area, km^{2}
Doppleschwand	816	6.95
Entlebuch	3,230	56.90
Escholzmatt-Marbach	4,349	106.4
Flühli	1,836	108.24
Hasle	1,739	40.33
Romoos	656	37.24
Schüpfheim	4,237	38.37
Werthenstein	2,125	15.80
Wolhusen	4,315	14.3
Total	23,303	424.43

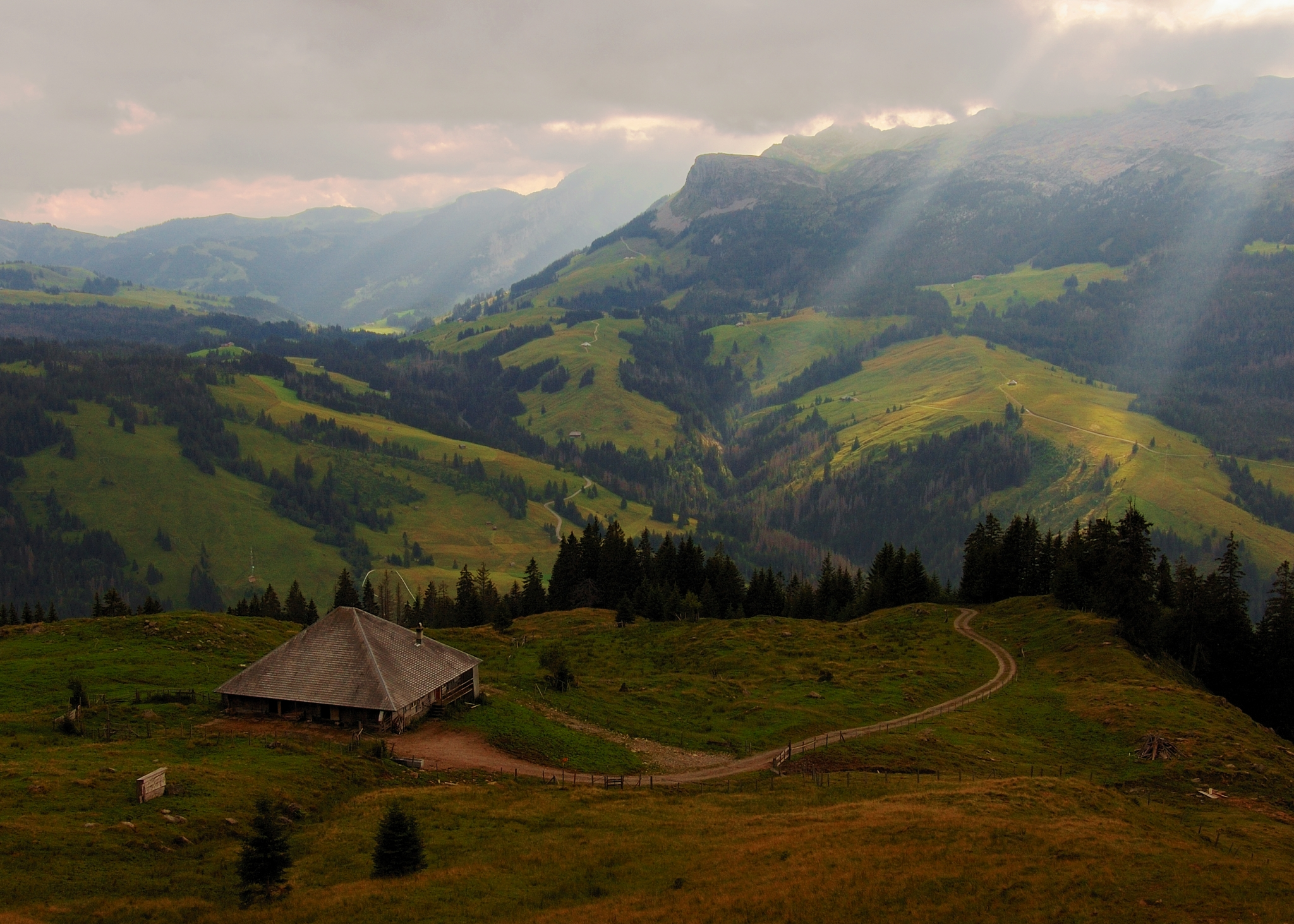
View from the Mittlist Gfäll Alp to Schrattenflue and Chemmeribodenflue in the Entlebuch region

== Mergers and name changes ==
- On 1 January 2013 the former municipalities of Escholzmatt and Marbach merged to form the new municipality of Escholzmatt-Marbach. The municipality of Wolhusen moved from the Sursee District to the Entlebuch District.

== See also ==
- Entlebuch Biosphere
