= Werthenstein =

- Municipality
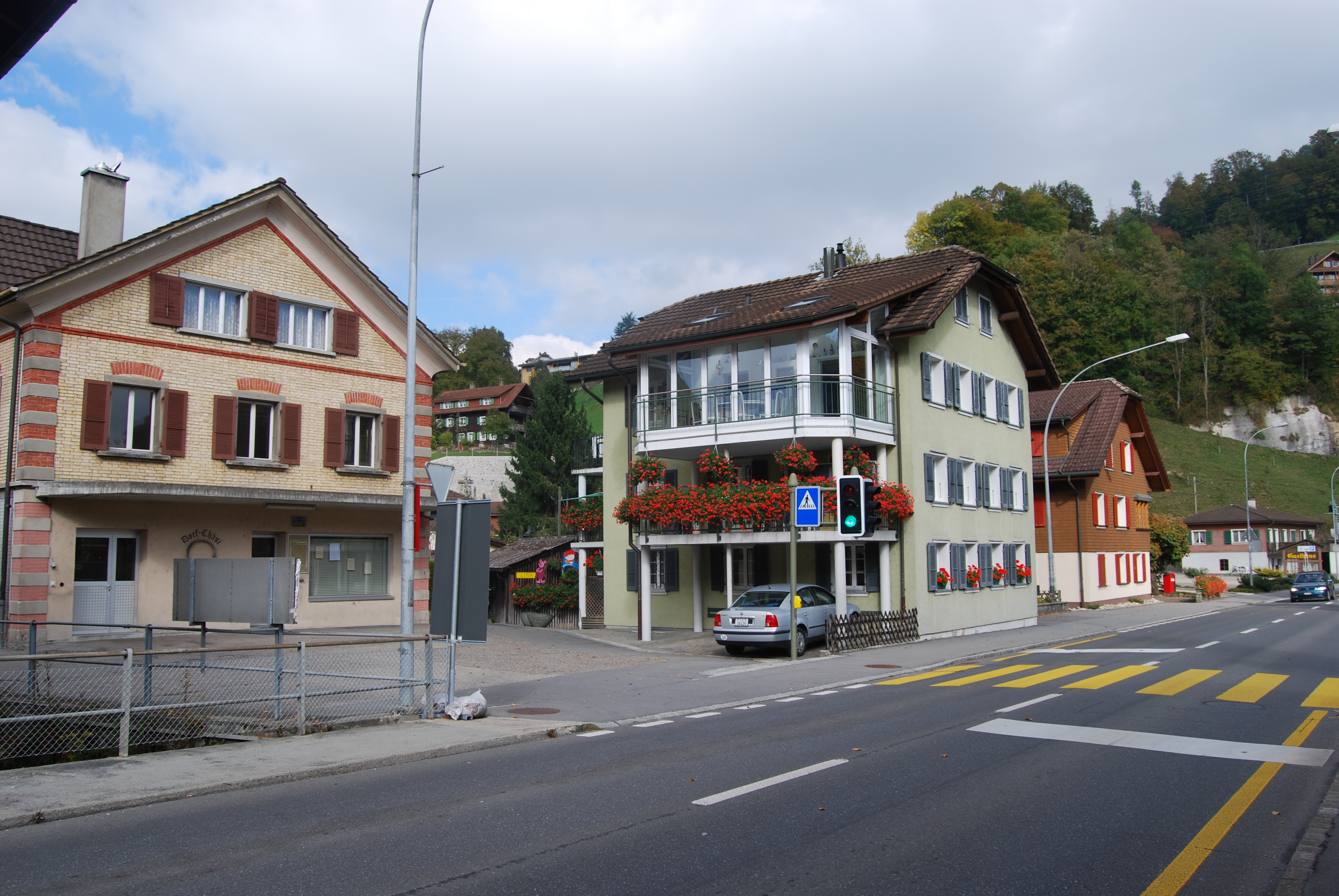

- Coat of arms
- Location of Werthenstein
- Location within Switzerland Location within Canton of Lucerne
- Coordinates: 47°3′N 8°6′E
- Country: Switzerland
- Canton: Lucerne
- District: Entlebuch

Area
  - Total: 15.80 km^{2} (6.10 sq mi)
- Elevation: 585 m (1,919 ft)

Population (December 2020)
  - Total: 2,125
  - Density: 134.5/km^{2} (348.3/sq mi)
- Time zone: UTC+01:00 (CET)
  - Summer (DST): UTC+02:00 (CEST)
- Postal code: 6106
- SFOS number: 1009
- ISO 3166 code: CH-LU
- Surrounded by: Entlebuch, Malters, Ruswil, Schwarzenberg, Wolhusen
- Website: www.werthenstein.ch

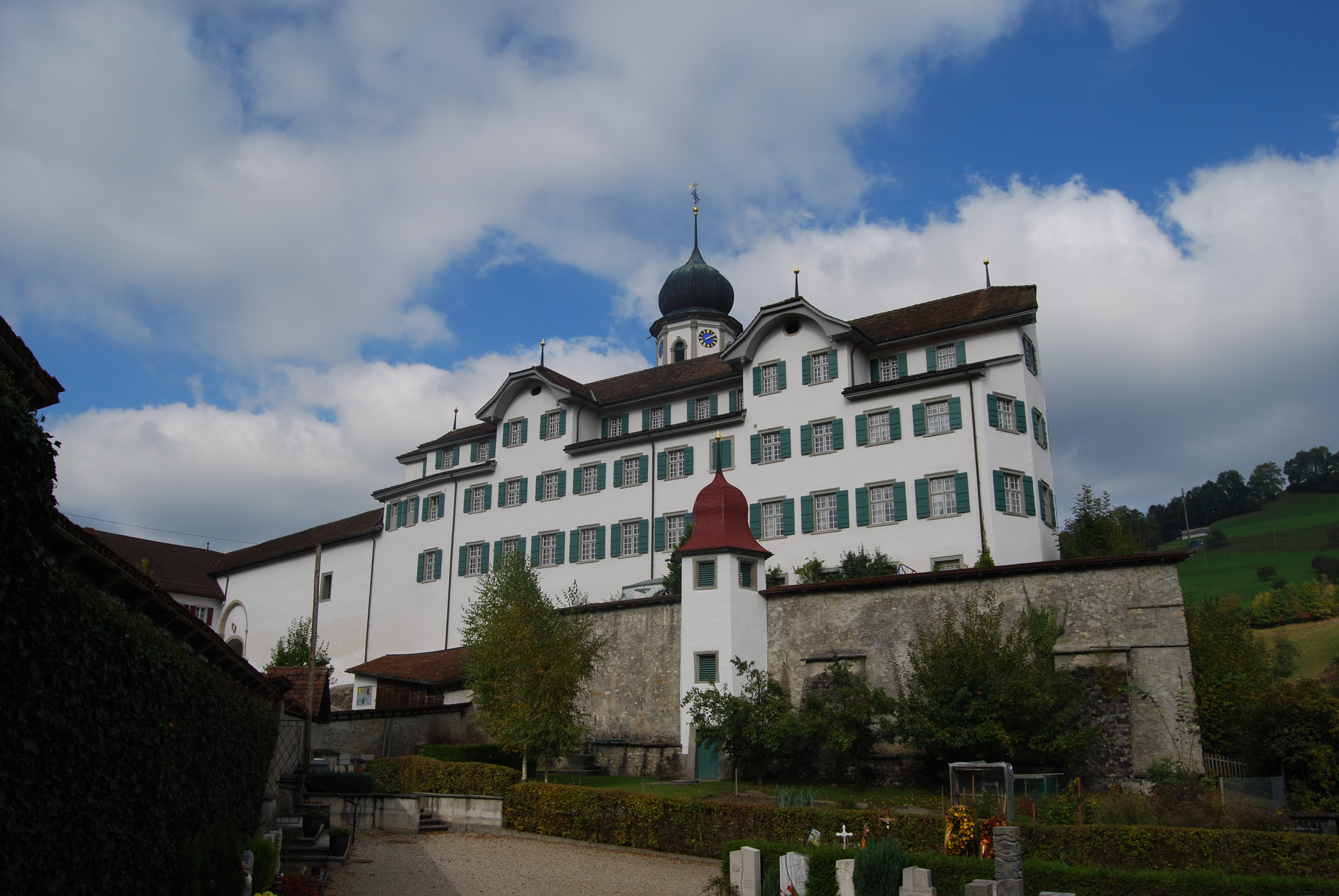
Pilgrimage church and monastery Werthenstein

Werthenstein is a municipality in the district of Entlebuch in the canton of Lucerne in Switzerland.

== Geography ==
Aerial view (1950)

Werthenstein has an area of 15.7 km^{2} (6.1 sq mi). Of this area, 59.6% is used for agricultural purposes, while 32.4% is forested. Of the rest of the land, 6.9% is settled (buildings or roads) and the remainder (1.1%) is non-productive (rivers, glaciers or mountains). In the 1997 land survey, 32.38% of the total land area was forested. Of the agricultural land, 56.28% is used for farming or pastures, while 3.31% is used for orchards or vine crops. Of the settled areas, 2.93% is covered with buildings, 1.08% is industrial, 0.38% is classed as special developments, 0.25% is parks or greenbelts and 2.29% is transportation infrastructure. Of the unproductive areas, 0.96% is unproductive flowing water (rivers) and 0.13% is other unproductive land.

== Demographics ==
Werthenstein has a population (as of 31 December 2020) of 2,125. As of 2007, 7.8% of the population was made up of foreign nationals. Over the last 10 years the population has decreased at a rate of 0%. Most of the population (as of 2000) speaks German (96.4%), with Italian being second most common ( 0.7%) and Albanian being third ( 0.6%).

In the 2007 election the most popular party was the CVP which received 42.4% of the vote. The next three most popular parties were the SVP (31.7%), the FDP (15.4%) and the SPS (4.5%).

The age distribution in Werthenstein is; 479 people or 25.5% of the population is 0–19 years old. 455 people or 24.2% are 20–39 years old, and 650 people or 34.5% are 40–64 years old. The senior population distribution is 219 people or 11.6% are 65–79 years old, 73 or 3.9% are 80–89 years old and 6 people or 0.3% of the population are 90+ years old.

In Werthenstein about 58.3% of the population (between age 25–64) have completed either non-mandatory upper secondary education or additional higher education (either university or a Fachhochschule).

As of 2000 there are 697 households, of which 188 households (or about 27.0%) contain only a single individual. 95 or about 13.6% are large households, with at least five members. As of 2000 there were 385 inhabited buildings in the municipality, of which 225 were built only as housing, and 160 were mixed use buildings. There were 148 single family homes, 38 double family homes, and 39 multi-family homes in the municipality. Most homes were either two (104) or three (86) story structures. There were only 12 single story buildings and 23 four or more story buildings.

Werthenstein has an unemployment rate of 1.45%. As of 2005, there were 230 people employed in the primary economic sector and about 88 businesses involved in this sector. 603 people are employed in the secondary sector and there are 31 businesses in this sector. 713 people are employed in the tertiary sector, with 58 businesses in this sector. As of 2000 51.3% of the population of the municipality were employed in some capacity. At the same time, females made up 37.5% of the workforce.

In the 2000 census the religious membership of Werthenstein was; 1,590 (84.%) were Roman Catholic, and 127 (6.7%) were Protestant, with an additional 33 (1.74%) that were of some other Christian faith. There are 27 individuals (1.43% of the population) who are Muslim. Of the rest; there were 5 (0.26%) individuals who belonged to another religion, 59 (3.12%) who did not belong to any organized religion, 51 (2.7%) who did not answer the question.
