= Doppleschwand =

- Municipality
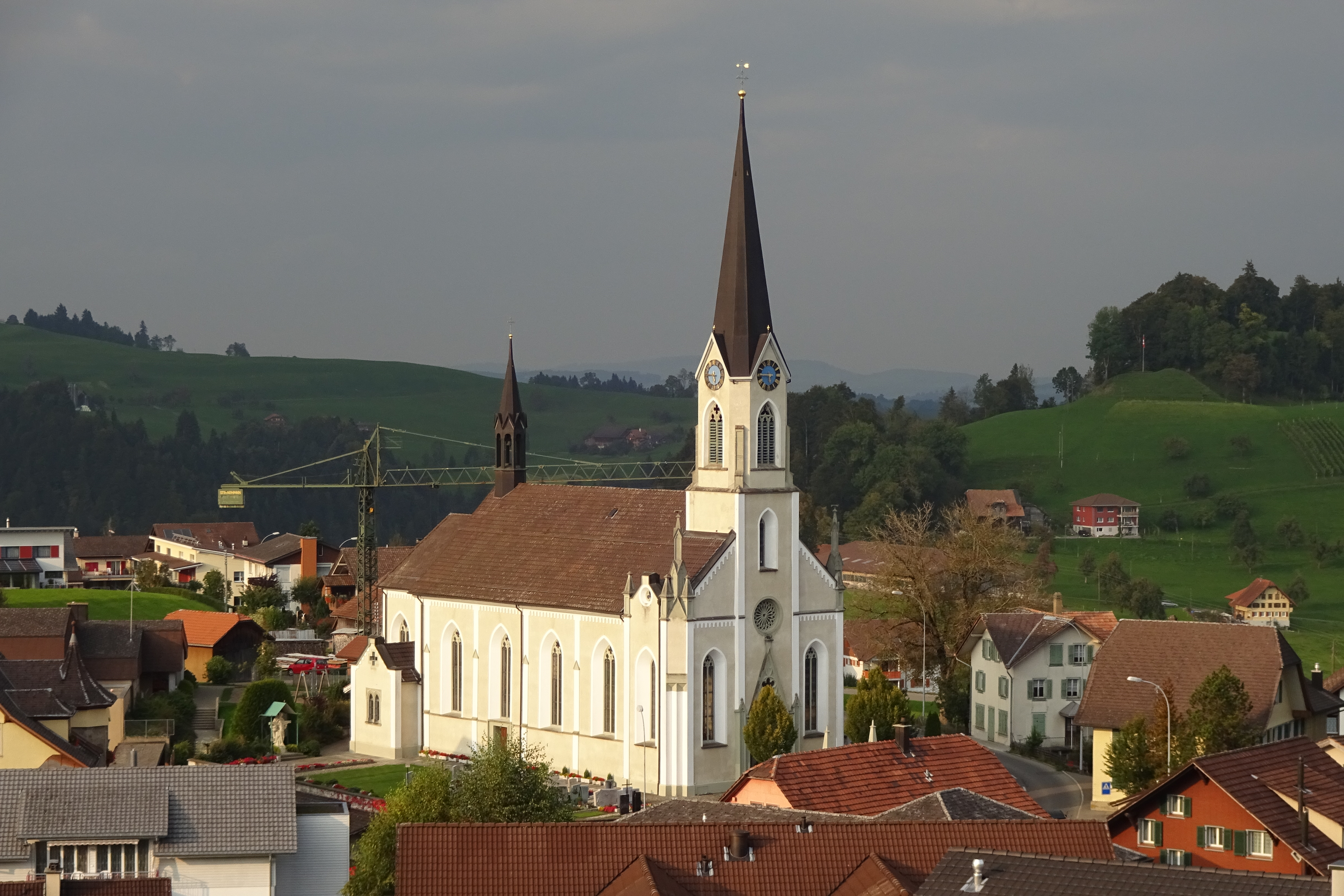

- Coat of arms
- Location of Doppleschwand
- Location within Switzerland Location within Canton of Lucerne
- Coordinates: 47°1′N 8°3′E
- Country: Switzerland
- Canton: Lucerne
- District: Entlebuch

Area
  - Total: 6.95 km^{2} (2.68 sq mi)
- Elevation: 751 m (2,464 ft)

Population (December 2020)
  - Total: 816
  - Density: 117/km^{2} (304/sq mi)
- Time zone: UTC+01:00 (CET)
  - Summer (DST): UTC+02:00 (CEST)
- Postal code: 6112
- SFOS number: 1001
- ISO 3166 code: CH-LU
- Surrounded by: Entlebuch, Hasle, Romoos, Wolhusen
- Website: www.doppleschwand.ch

Doppleschwand is a municipality in the district of Entlebuch in the canton of Lucerne in Switzerland.

== History ==
Doppleschwand is first mentioned in 1275 as Togelswande or Towenswande.

== Geography ==
Aerial view (1954)

Doppleschwand has an area of 7 km^{2} (2.7 sq mi). Of this area, 55.5% is used for agricultural purposes, while 36.3% is forested. Of the rest of the land, 5.5% is settled (buildings or roads) and the remainder (2.7%) is non-productive (rivers, glaciers or mountains). In the 1997 land survey, 36.55% of the total land area was forested. Of the agricultural land, 53.38% is used for farming or pastures, while 2.3% is used for orchards or vine crops. Of the settled areas, 2.59% is covered with buildings, 0.14% is industrial, 0.43% is classed as special developments, and 2.16% is transportation infrastructure. Of the unproductive areas, 2.3% is unproductive flowing water (rivers) and 0.14 is other unproductive land.

The municipality is made up of the linear village of Doppleschwand which is located on the terrace between the Grosse Fontanne and the Kleine Emme rivers. It consists of the village of Doppleschwand and the hamlets of Gober, Holz and Oberhüseren.

== Demographics ==
Doppleschwand has a population (as of 31 December 2020) of 816. As of 2007, 2.4% of the population was made up of foreign nationals. Over the last 10 years the population has grown at a rate of 11.9%. Most of the population (as of 2000) speaks German (97.7%), with Albanian being second most common (1.7%) and Dutch being third (0.3%).

In the 2007 election the most popular party was the CVP which received 62% of the vote. The next three most popular parties were the SVP (23%), the FDP (10.8%) and the SPS (2.8%).

The age distribution in Doppleschwand is; 215 people or 30.1% of the population is 0–19 years old. 209 people or 29.3% are 20–39 years old, and 201 people or 28.2% are 40–64 years old. The senior population distribution is 72 people or 10.1% are 65–79 years old, 12 or 1.7% are 80–89 years old and 5 people or 0.7% of the population are 90+ years old. The entire Swiss population is generally well educated. In Doppleschwand about 65.6% of the population (between age 25–64) have completed either non-mandatory upper secondary education or additional higher education (either university or a Fachhochschule).As of 2000 there are 217 households, of which 47 households (or about 21.7%) contain only a single individual. 38 or about 17.5% are large households, with at least five members. As of 2000 there were 149 inhabited buildings in the municipality, of which 91 were built only as housing, and 58 were mixed use buildings. There were 59 single family homes, 23 two family homes, and 9 multi-family homes in the municipality. Most homes were either two (63) or three (23) story structures. There were only 2 single story buildings and 3 four or more story buildings.

Doppleschwand has an unemployment rate of 0.48%. As of 2005, there were 111 people employed in the primary economic sector and about 34 businesses involved in this sector. 24 people are employed in the secondary sector and there are 7 businesses in this sector. 55 people are employed in the tertiary sector, with 17 businesses in this sector. As of 2000 50.4% of the population of the municipality were employed in some capacity. At the same time, females made up 36.2% of the workforce.

In the 2000 census the religious membership of Doppleschwand was; 620 (94.9%) were Roman Catholic, and 14 (2.1%) were Protestant. There are 9 individuals (1.38% of the population) who are Muslim. Of the rest; there were 3 (0.46%) who do not belong to any organized religion, 7 (1.07%) who did not answer the question.

The historical population is given in the following table:

year	population
1745	390
1798	536
1837	681
1850	668
1900	523
1950	502
1970	470
2000	653

== Pictures ==
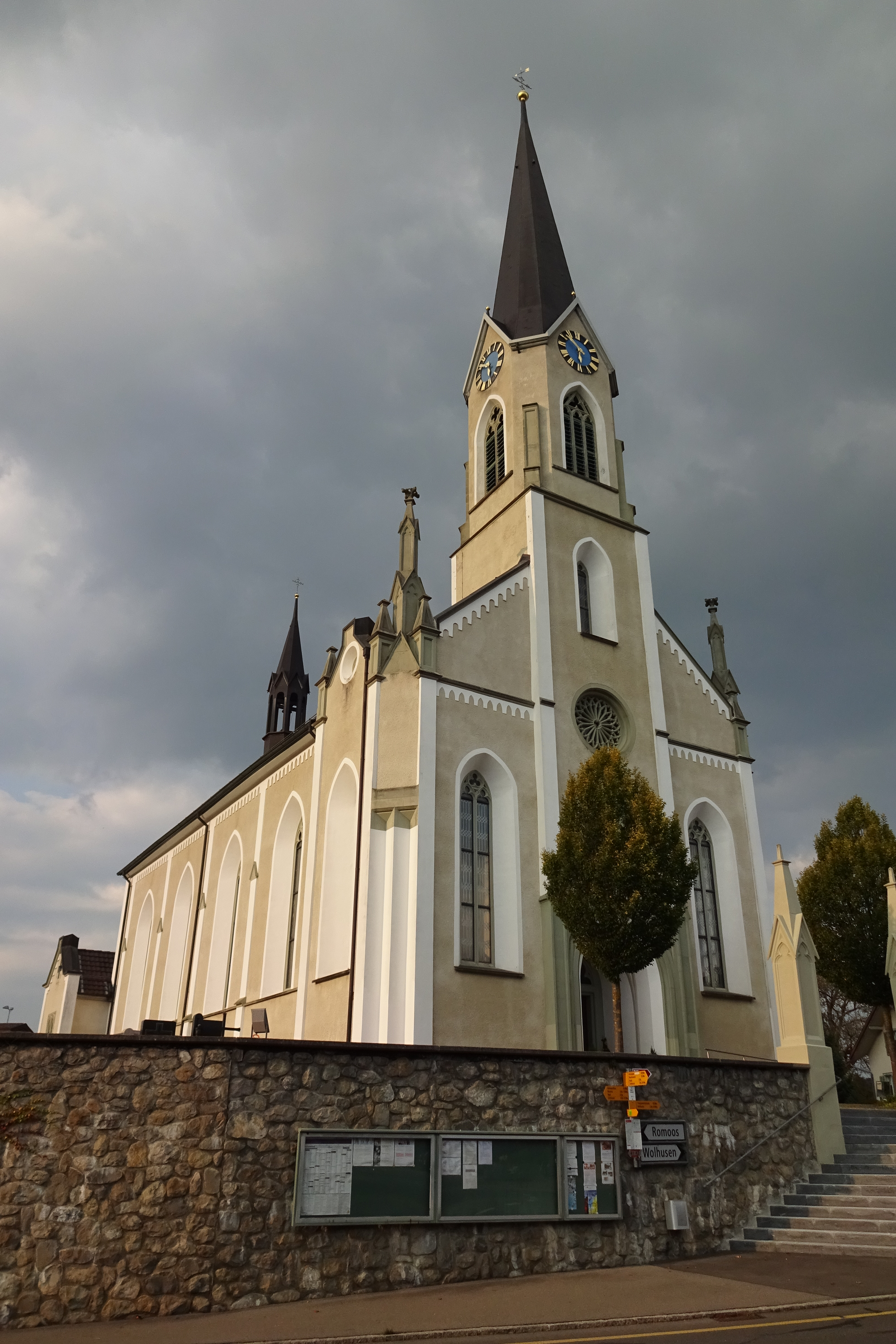
Doppleschwand : Parish Church of Saint Nicholas - south & west façade

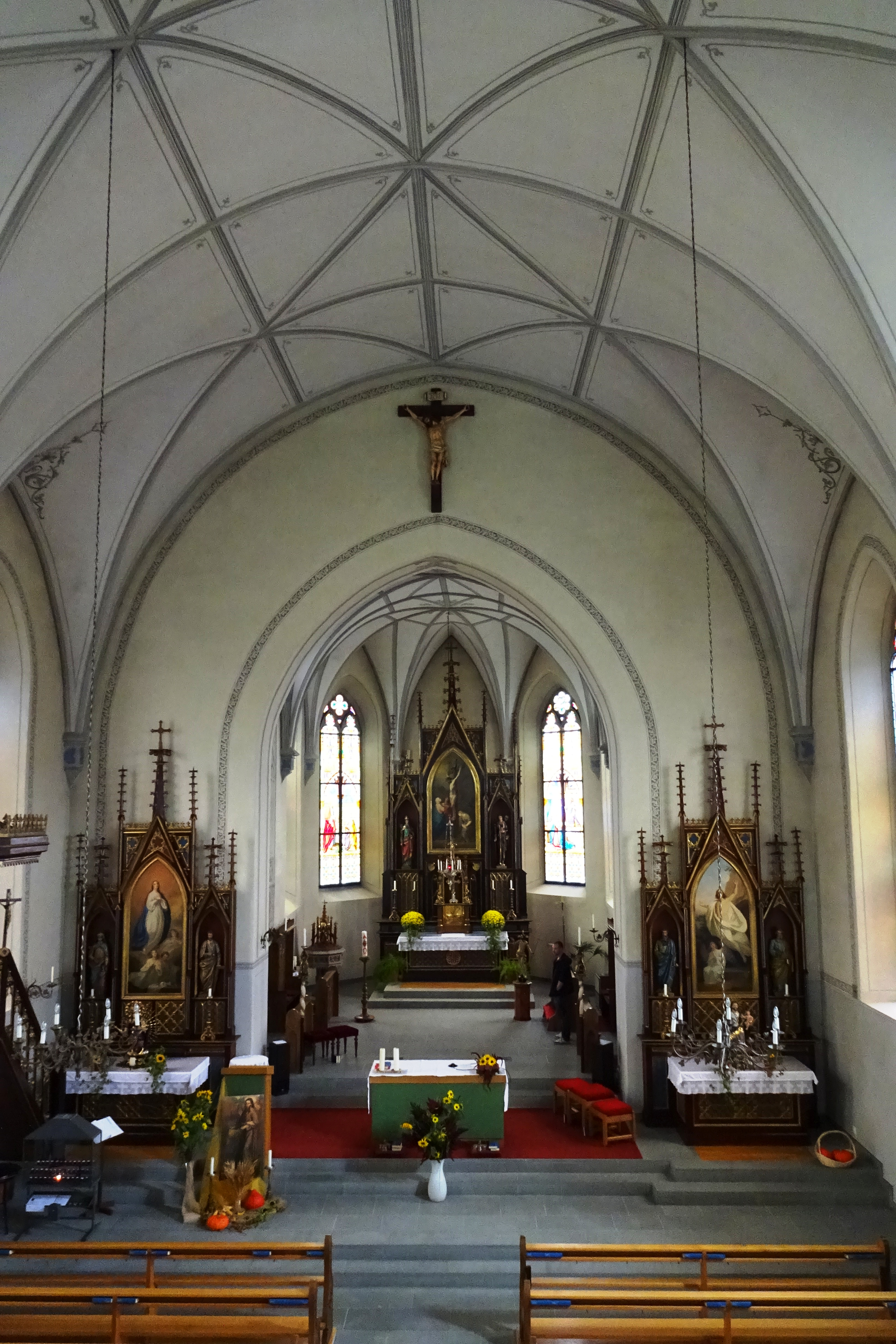
Doppleschwand : Parish Church of Saint Nicholas - interior view

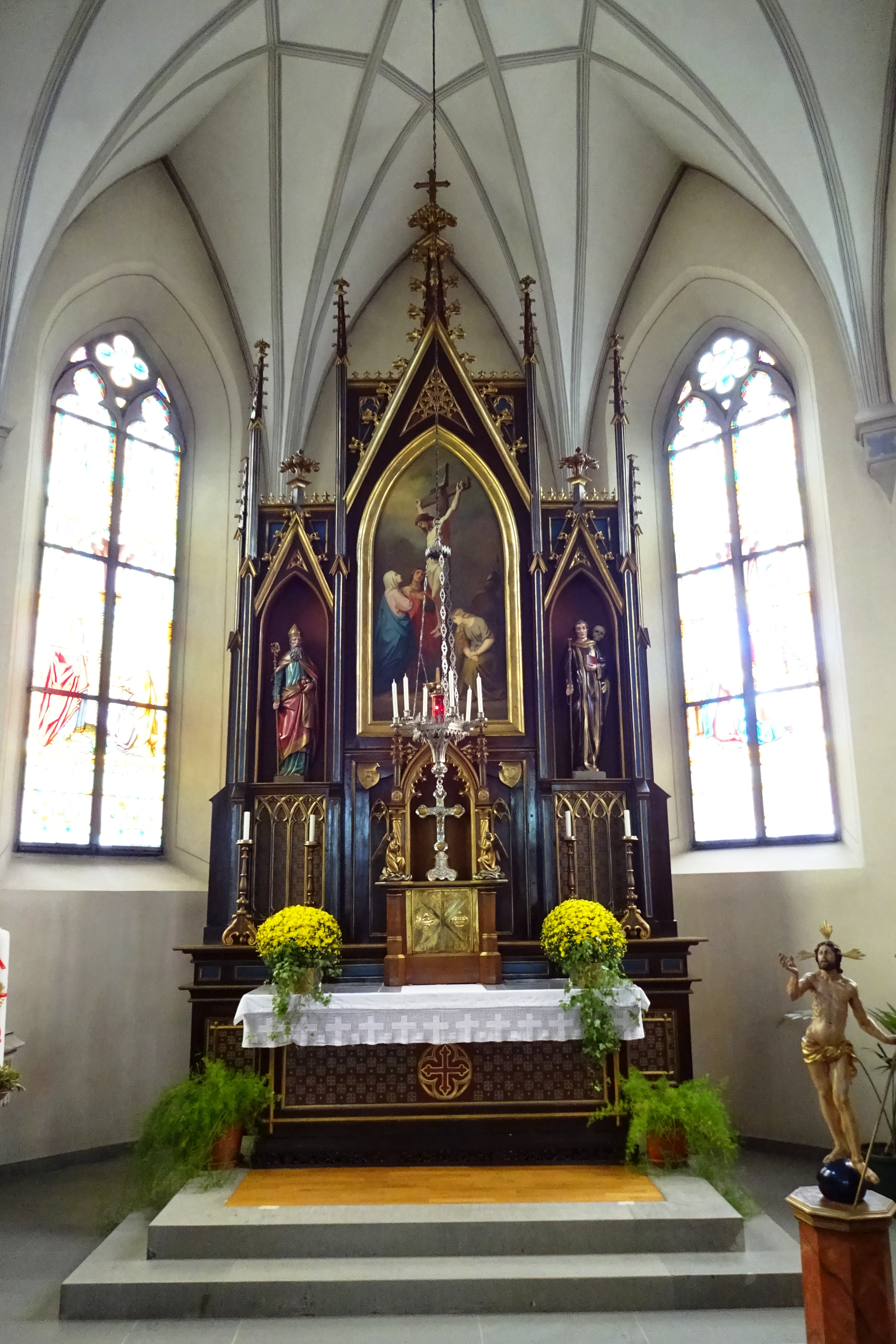
Doppleschwand : Parish Church of Saint Nicholas - interior view, high altar

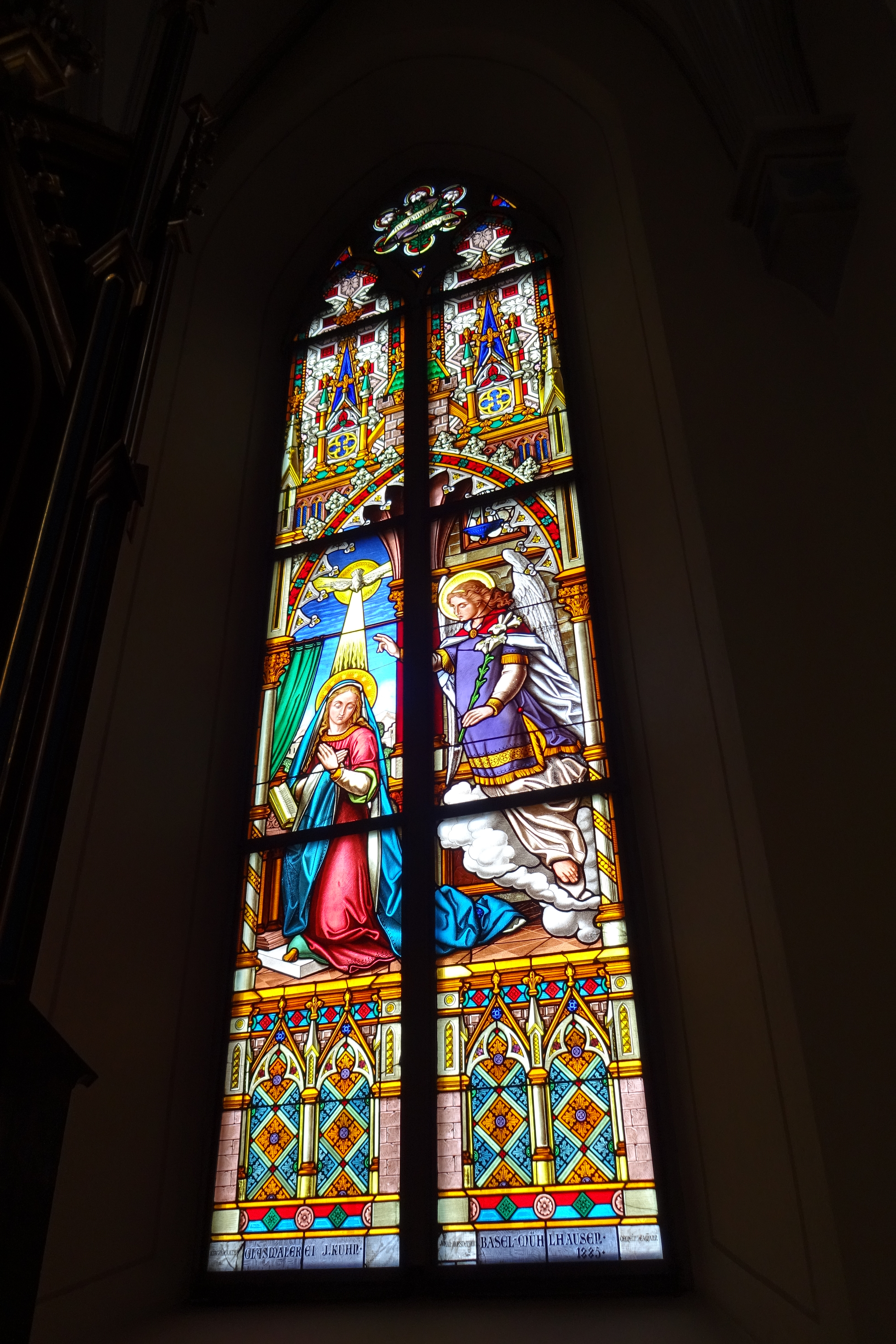
Doppleschwand : Parish Church of Saint Nicholas - interior view, choir loft window
