= Marbach, Lucerne =

Marbach
- Former municipality
- Flag Coat of arms
- Location of Marbach
- Location within Switzerland Location within Canton of Lucerne
- Coordinates: 46°51′N 7°54′E
- Country: Switzerland
- Canton: Lucerne
- District: Entlebuch

Area
  - Total: 45.10 km^{2} (17.41 sq mi)
- Elevation: 871 m (2,858 ft)

Population (Dec 2011)
  - Total: 1,217
  - Density: 26.98/km^{2} (69.89/sq mi)
- Time zone: UTC+01:00 (CET)
  - Summer (DST): UTC+02:00 (CEST)
- Postal code: 6196
- SFOS number: 1006
- ISO 3166 code: CH-LU
- Surrounded by: Eggiwil (BE), Escholzmatt, Flühli, Schangnau (BE), Trub (BE)
- Website: www.marbach-lu.ch

Marbach (Swiss Standard German pronunciation: [ˈmarbax]) is a former municipality in the district of Entlebuch in the canton of Lucerne in Switzerland. On 1 January 2013 the former municipalities of Escholzmatt and Marbach merged to form the new municipality of Escholzmatt-Marbach.

== History ==
Marbach is first mentioned in 1306 as Marpach.

== Geography ==
Aerial view (1957)

Marbach had an area of 45.1 km^{2} (17.4 sq mi). Of this area, 45.3% is used for agricultural purposes, while 47.4% is forested. Of the rest of the land, 2.6% is settled (buildings or roads) and the remainder (4.7%) is non-productive (rivers, glaciers or mountains). In the 1997 land survey, 47.39% of the total land area was forested. Of the agricultural land, 45.11% is used for farming or pastures, while 0.18% is used for orchards or vine crops. Of the settled areas, 1.04% is covered with buildings, 0.07% is industrial, 0.29% is classed as special developments, 0.07% is parks or greenbelts and 1.11% is transportation infrastructure. Of the unproductive areas, 0.86% is unproductive flowing water (rivers) and 3.88% is other unproductive land.

The former municipality is located in the southwest corner of the Canton.

== Demographics ==
Marbach had a population (as of 2011) of 1,217. As of 2007, 1.7% of the population was made up of foreign nationals. Over the last 10 years the population has decreased at a rate of -11.5%. Most of the population (as of 2000) speaks German (97.8%), with Portuguese being second most common (0.6%) and Serbo-Croatian being third (0.4%).

In the 2007 election the most popular party was the CVP which received 55% of the vote. The next three most popular parties were the FDP (20.5%), the SVP (19.7%) and the SPS (2.4%).

The age distribution in Marbach is; 254 people or 21.3% of the population is 0–19 years old. 303 people or 25.4% are 20–39 years old, and 416 people or 34.9% are 40–64 years old. The senior population distribution is 167 people or 14% are 65–79 years old, 45 or 3.8% are 80–89 years old and 8 people or 0.7% of the population are 90+ years old.

The entire Swiss population is generally well educated. In Marbach about 52.4% of the population (between age 25–64) have completed either non-mandatory upper secondary education or additional higher education (either university or a Fachhochschule).

As of 2000 there are 444 households, of which 134 households (or about 30.2%) contain only a single individual. 59 or about 13.3% are large households, with at least five members. As of 2000 there were 321 inhabited buildings in the municipality, of which 162 were built only as housing, and 159 were mixed use buildings. There were 109 single family homes, 35 double family homes, and 18 multi-family homes in the municipality. Most homes were either two (107) or three (43) story structures. There were only 7 single story buildings and 5 four or more story buildings.

Marbach has an unemployment rate of 0.65%. As of 2005, there were 278 people employed in the primary economic sector and about 108 businesses involved in this sector. 51 people are employed in the secondary sector and there are 12 businesses in this sector. 179 people are employed in the tertiary sector, with 33 businesses in this sector. As of 2000 49.5% of the population of the municipality were employed in some capacity. At the same time, females made up 37.1% of the workforce.

In the 2000 census the religious membership of Marbach was; 859 (73.1%) were Roman Catholic, and 238 (20.3%) were Protestant, with an additional 1 (0.09%) that were of some other Christian faith. There are 8 individuals (0.68% of the population) who are Muslim. Of the rest; there were 5 (0.43%) individuals who belong to another religion, 13 (1.11%) who do not belong to any organized religion, 51 (4.34%) who did not answer the question.

The historical population is given in the following table:

year	population
1850	1,850
1900	1,491
1950	1,402
2000	1,175

== Weather ==
Marbach has an average of 162.3 days of rain per year and on average receives 1,760 mm (69 in) of precipitation. The wettest month is June during which time Marbach receives an average of 218 mm (8.6 in) of precipitation. During this month there is precipitation for an average of 16.4 days. The month with the most days of precipitation is May, with an average of 16.9, but with only 179 mm (7.0 in) of precipitation. The driest month of the year is February with an average of 112 mm (4.4 in) of precipitation over 16.4 days.

== Gallery ==
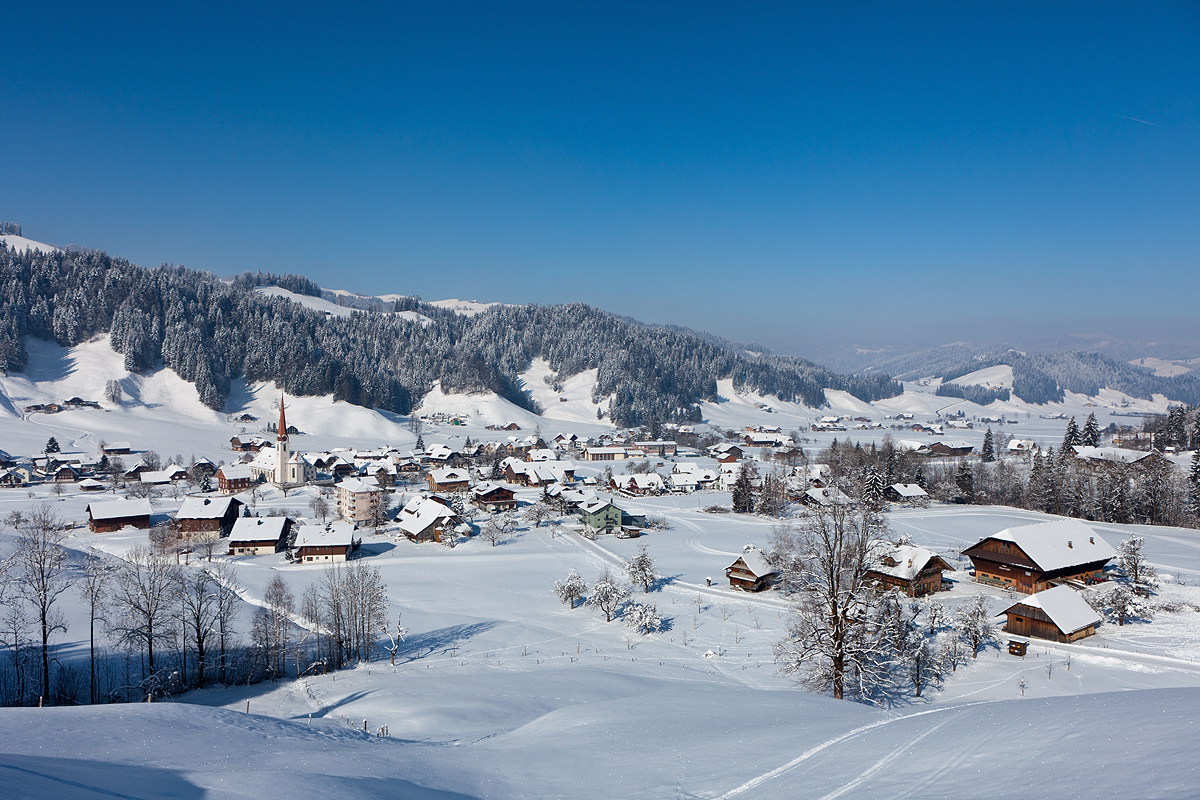
Marbach, Entlebuch

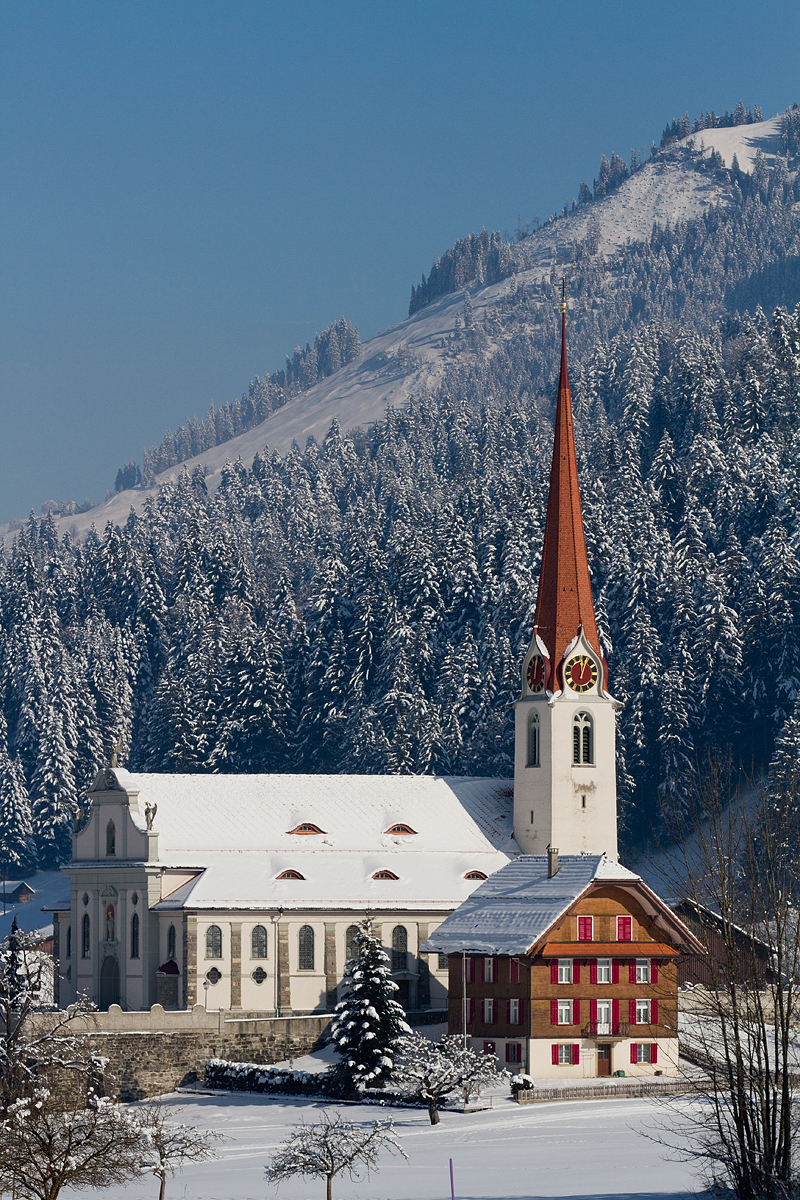
Church

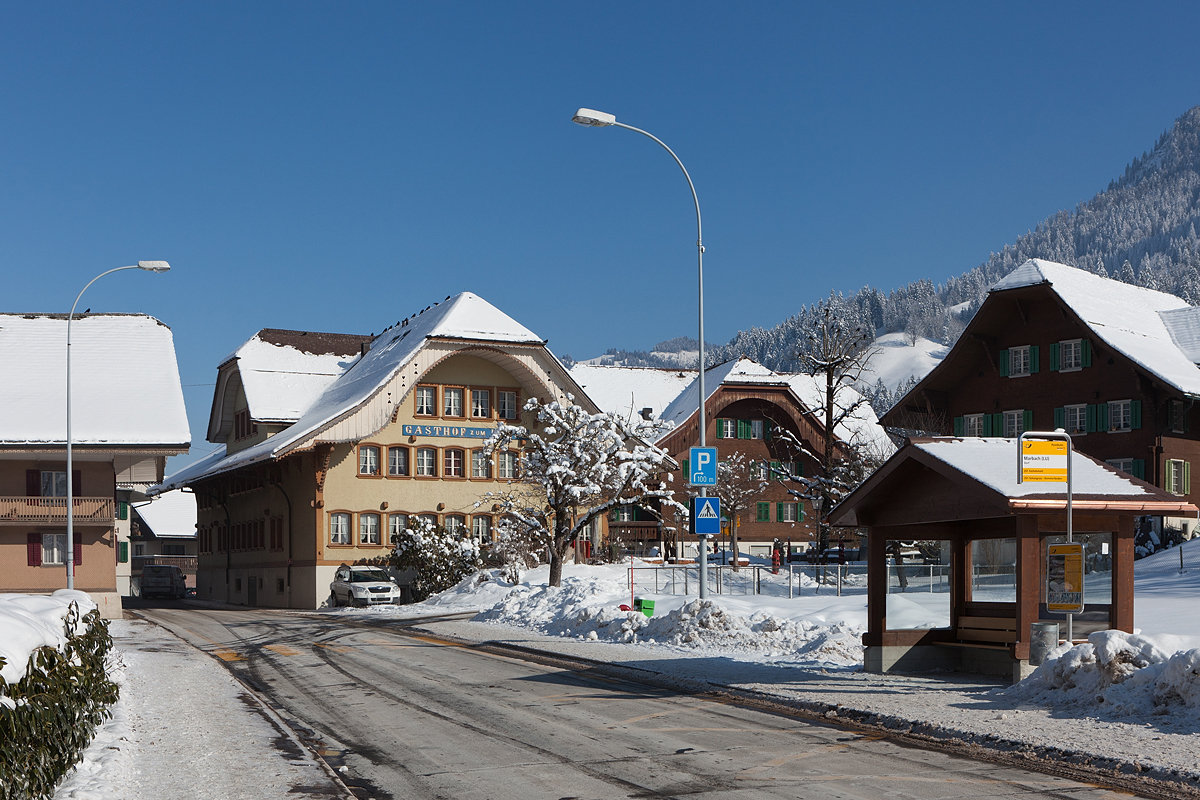
Centre of Marbach

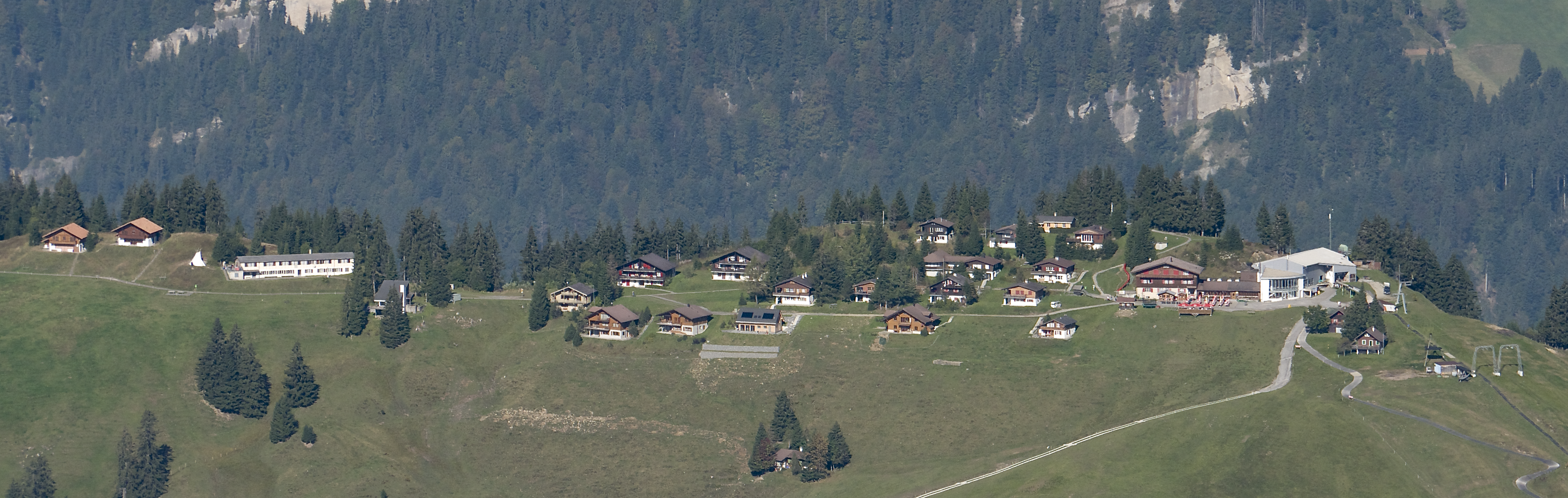
Marbachegg
