= Romoos =

- Municipality
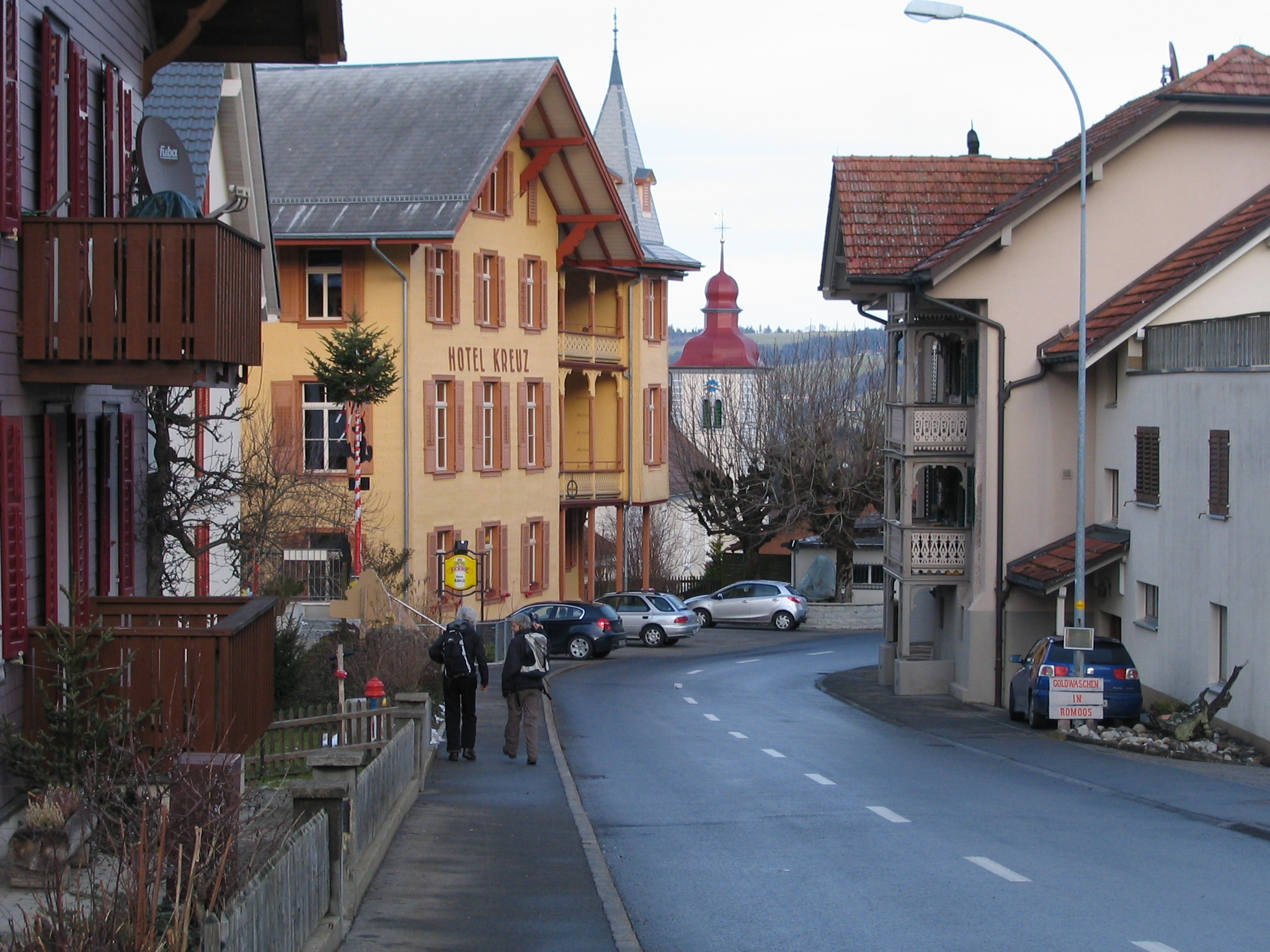

- Flag Coat of arms
- Location of Romoos
- Location within Switzerland Location within Canton of Lucerne
- Coordinates: 47°1′N 8°2′E
- Country: Switzerland
- Canton: Lucerne
- District: Entlebuch

Area
  - Total: 37.29 km^{2} (14.40 sq mi)
- Elevation: 791 m (2,595 ft)

Population (December 2020)
  - Total: 656
  - Density: 17.6/km^{2} (45.6/sq mi)
- Time zone: UTC+01:00 (CET)
  - Summer (DST): UTC+02:00 (CEST)
- Postal code: 6112
- SFOS number: 1007
- ISO 3166 code: CH-LU
- Surrounded by: Doppleschwand, Entlebuch, Escholzmatt, Hasle, Hergiswil bei Willisau, Menznau, Schüpfheim, Trub (BE), Wolhusen
- Website: www.romoos.ch

Romoos is a municipality in the district of Entlebuch in the canton of Lucerne in Switzerland.

== Geography ==
Romoos has an area of 37.3 km^{2} (14.4 sq mi). Of this area, 34.6% is used for agricultural purposes, while 61.8% is forested. Of the rest of the land, 2.2% is settled (buildings or roads) and the remainder (1.4%) is non-productive (rivers, glaciers or mountains). In the 1997 land survey, 61.76% of the total land area was forested. Of the agricultural land, 34.3% is used for farming or pastures, while 0.29% is used for orchards or vine crops. Of the settled areas, 0.8% is covered with buildings, 0.24% is classed as special developments, 0.03% is parks or greenbelts and 1.13% is transportation infrastructure. Of the unproductive areas, 0.86% is unproductive flowing water (rivers) and 0.59% is other unproductive land.

== Demographics ==
Romoos has a population (as of 31 December 2020) of 656. As of 2007, 0.5% of the population was made up of foreign nationals. Over the last 10 years the population has decreased at a rate of -11.1%. Most of the population (as of 2000) speaks German (98.5%), with Albanian being second most common ( 0.7%) and Portuguese being third ( 0.4%).

In the 2007 election the most popular party was the CVP which received 63.4% of the vote. The next three most popular parties were the SVP (21.8%), the FDP (11.9%) and the Green Party (1.6%).

The age distribution in Romoos is; 193 people or 27.1% of the population is 0–19 years old. 170 people or 23.8% are 20–39 years old, and 231 people or 32.4% are 40–64 years old. The senior population distribution is 70 people or 9.8% are 65–79 years old, 42 or 5.9% are 80–89 years old and 7 people or 1% of the population are 90+ years old.

In Romoos about 47.3% of the population (between age 25-64) have completed either non-mandatory upper secondary education or additional higher education (either university or a Fachhochschule).

As of 2000 there are 218 households, of which 45 households (or about 20.6%) contain only a single individual. 61 or about 28.% are large households, with at least five members. As of 2000 there were 159 inhabited buildings in the municipality, of which 62 were built only as housing, and 97 were mixed use buildings. There were 42 single family homes, 13 double family homes, and 7 multi-family homes in the municipality. Most homes were either two (29) or three (24) story structures. There were only 1 single story buildings and 8 four or more story buildings.

Romoos has an unemployment rate of 0.3%. As of 2005, there were 212 people employed in the primary economic sector and about 88 businesses involved in this sector. 44 people are employed in the secondary sector and there are 9 businesses in this sector. 40 people are employed in the tertiary sector, with 10 businesses in this sector. As of 2000 45.6% of the population of the municipality were employed in some capacity. At the same time, females made up 35.6% of the workforce.
