= Wolhusen =

- Municipality
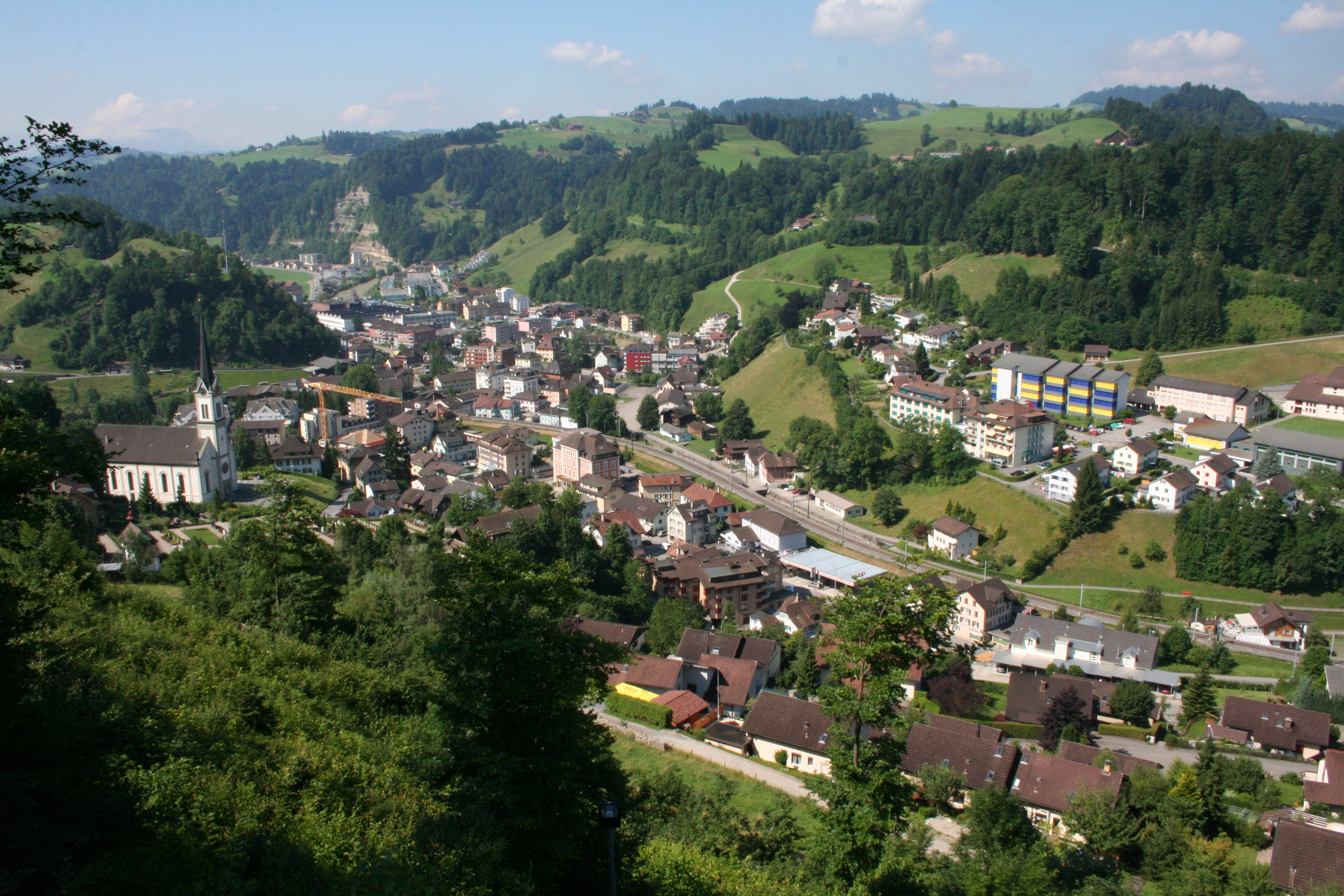

- Flag Coat of arms
- Location of Wolhusen
- Location within Switzerland Location within Canton of Lucerne
- Coordinates: 47°4′N 8°4′E
- Country: Switzerland
- Canton: Lucerne
- District: Entlebuch

Area
  - Total: 14.30 km^{2} (5.52 sq mi)
- Elevation: 582 m (1,909 ft)

Population (December 2020)
  - Total: 4,315
  - Density: 301.7/km^{2} (781.5/sq mi)
- Time zone: UTC+01:00 (CET)
  - Summer (DST): UTC+02:00 (CEST)
- Postal code: 6110
- SFOS number: 1107
- ISO 3166 code: CH-LU
- Surrounded by: Doppleschwand, Entlebuch, Menznau, Romoos, Ruswil, Werthenstein
- Website: www.wolhusen.ch

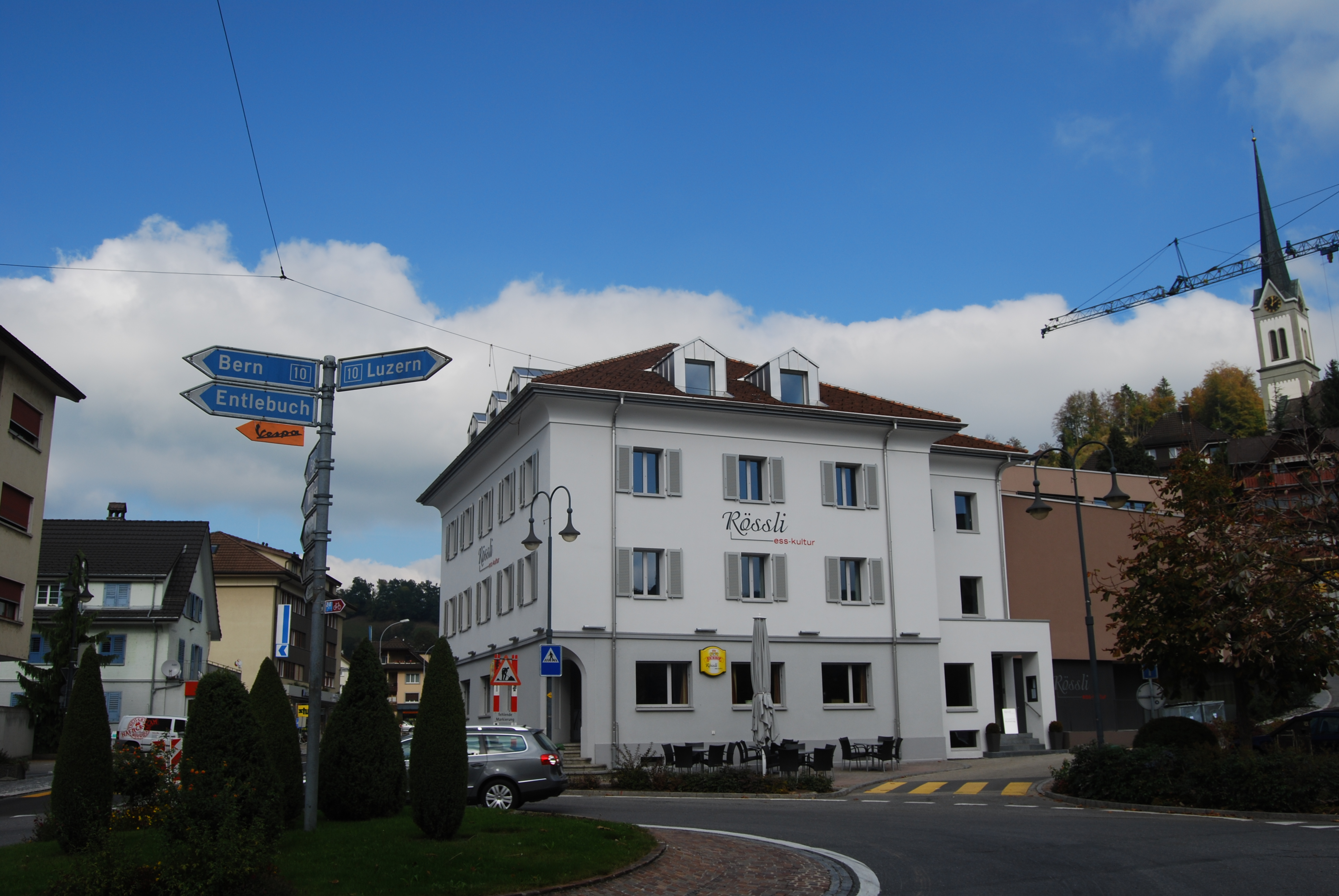
Road cross in the center of Wolhusen

Wolhusen is a municipality in the district of Entlebuch in the canton of Lucerne in Switzerland.

== Geography ==
Aerial view from 300 m by Walter Mittelholzer (1922)

Wolhusen has an area of 14.3 km^{2} (5.5 sq mi). Of this area, 58.1% is used for agricultural purposes, while 32.6% is forested. Of the rest of the land, 8.6% is settled (buildings or roads) and the remainder (0.7%) is non-productive (rivers, glaciers or mountains). In the 1997 land survey, 32.61% of the total land area was forested. Of the agricultural land, 54.51% is used for farming or pastures, while 3.5% is used for orchards or vine crops. Of the settled areas, 4.27% is covered with buildings, 0.56% is industrial, 0.42% is classed as special developments, 0.14% is parks or greenbelts and 3.29% is transportation infrastructure. Of the unproductive areas, 0.56% is unproductive flowing water (rivers) and 0.14% is other unproductive land.

On 1 January 2013 the municipality of Wolhusen moved from the Sursee District to the Entlebuch District.

== Demographics ==
Wolhusen has a population (as of 31 December 2020) of 4,315. As of 2007, 14.0% of the population was made up of foreign nationals. Over the last 10 years the population has grown at a rate of 4.6%. Most of the population (as of 2000) speaks German (92.4%), with Albanian being second most common ( 2.5%) and Serbo-Croatian being third ( 1.1%).

In the 2007 election the most popular party was the CVP which received 47.7% of the vote. The next three most popular parties were the SVP (21.5%), the FDP (17%) and the SPS (7%).

The age distribution in Wolhusen is; 1,031 people or 24.9% of the population is 0–19 years old. 1,159 people or 28% are 20–39 years old, and 1,312 people or 31.7% are 40–64 years old. The senior population distribution is 460 people or 11.1% are 65–79 years old, 149 or 3.6% are 80–89 years old and 34 people or 0.8% of the population are 90+ years old.

In Wolhusen about 66.2% of the population (between age 25-64) have completed either non-mandatory upper secondary education or additional higher education (either university or a Fachhochschule).

As of 2000 there are 1,440 households, of which 375 households (or about 26.0%) contain only a single individual. 187 or about 13.0% are large households, with at least five members. As of 2000 there were 668 inhabited buildings in the municipality, of which 487 were built only as housing, and 181 were mixed use buildings. There were 279 single family homes, 94 double family homes, and 114 multi-family homes in the municipality. Most homes were either two (230) or three (184) story structures. There were only 17 single story buildings and 56 four or more story buildings.

Wolhusen has an unemployment rate of 1.78%. As of 2005, there were 191 people employed in the primary economic sector and about 73 businesses involved in this sector. 392 people are employed in the secondary sector and there are 36 businesses in this sector. 1451 people are employed in the tertiary sector, with 121 businesses in this sector. As of 2000 49.6% of the population of the municipality were employed in some capacity. At the same time, females made up 42.5% of the workforce.

In the 2000 census the religious membership of Wolhusen was; 3,120 (76.4%) were Roman Catholic, and 343 (8.4%) were Protestant, with an additional 55 (1.35%) that were of some other Christian faith. There are 212 individuals (5.19% of the population) who are Muslim. Of the rest; there were 14 (0.34%) individuals who belong to another religion (not listed), 156 (3.82%) who do not belong to any organized religion, 186 (4.55%) who did not answer the question.
