= Schüpfheim =

- Municipality
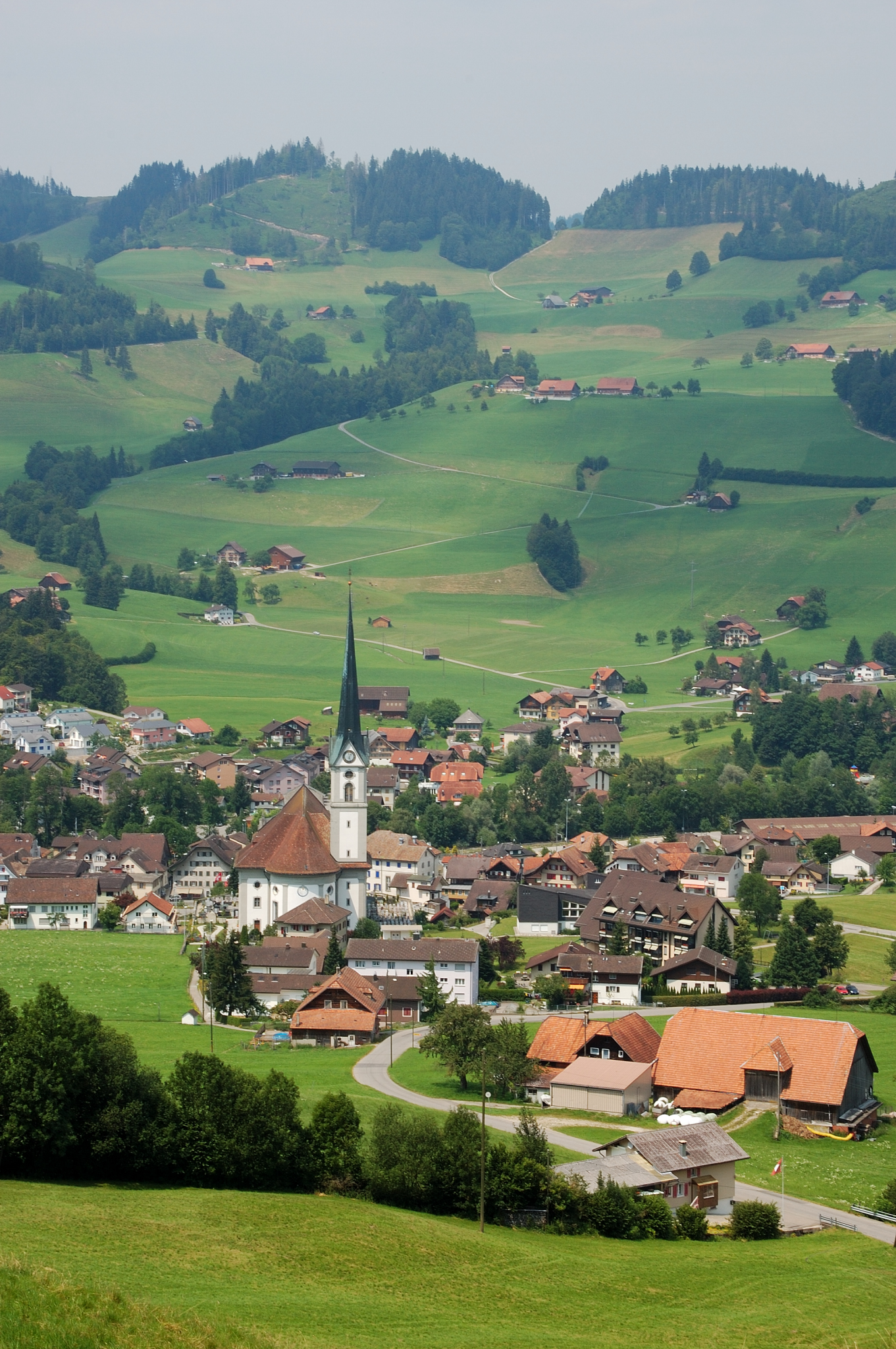

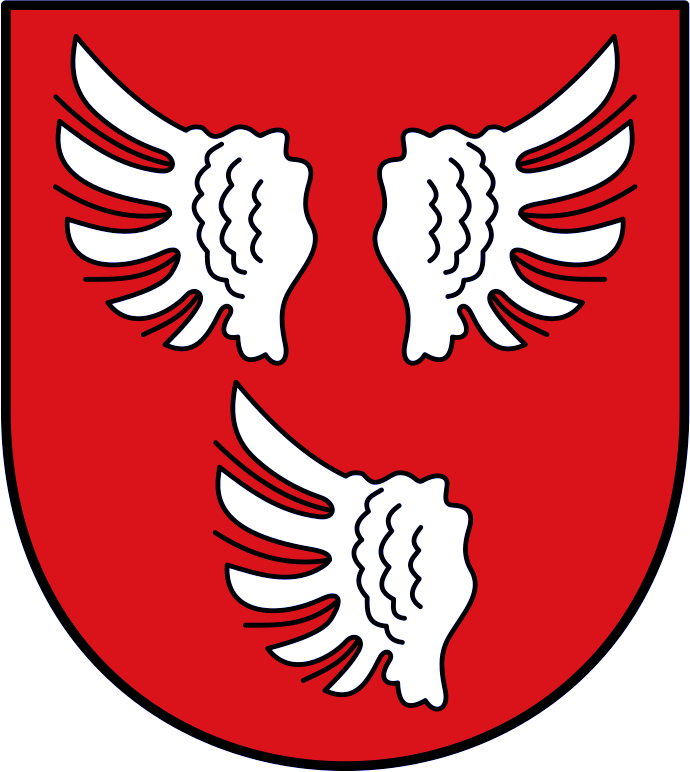
- Coat of arms
- Location of Schüpfheim
- Location within Switzerland Location within Canton of Lucerne
- Coordinates: 46°57′N 8°1′E
- Country: Switzerland
- Canton: Lucerne
- District: Entlebuch

Area
  - Total: 38.37 km^{2} (14.81 sq mi)
- Elevation: 719 m (2,359 ft)

Population (December 2020)
  - Total: 4,237
  - Density: 110.4/km^{2} (286.0/sq mi)
- Time zone: UTC+01:00 (CET)
  - Summer (DST): UTC+02:00 (CEST)
- Postal code: 6170
- SFOS number: 1008
- ISO 3166 code: CH-LU
- Surrounded by: Entlebuch, Escholzmatt, Flühli, Hasle, Romoos
- Website: www.schuepfheim.ch

Schüpfheim is a municipality in the district of Entlebuch in the canton of Lucerne in Switzerland. It is part of the UNESCO Entlebuch Biosphere Reserve since 2001.

== Geography ==
Aerial view (1957)

Schüpfheim has an area of 38.5 km^{2} (14.9 sq mi). Of this area, 59.7% is used for agricultural purposes, while 33.1% is forested. Of the rest of the land, 5.3% is settled (buildings or roads) and the remainder (1.9%) is non-productive (rivers, glaciers or mountains). In the 1997 land survey, 32.82% of the total land area was forested. Of the agricultural land, 59.3% is used for farming or pastures, while 0.68% is used for orchards or vine crops. Of the settled areas, 2.61% is covered with buildings, 0.37% is industrial, 0.26% is classed as special developments, 0.21% is parks or greenbelts and 1.88% is transportation infrastructure. Of the unproductive areas, 0.55% is unproductive flowing water (rivers) and 1.33% is other unproductive land.

== Demographics ==
Schüpfheim has a population (as of 31 December 2020) of 4,237. As of 2007, 3.6% of the population was made up of foreign nationals. Over the last 10 years the population has decreased at a rate of -1.3%. Most of the population (as of 2000) speaks German (96.0%), with Serbo-Croatian being second most common ( 1.2%) and Albanian being third ( 0.9%).

In the 2007 election the most popular party was the CVP which received 46.3% of the vote. The next three most popular parties were the SVP (29.4%), the FDP (14.1%) and the SPS (4.8%).

The age distribution in Schüpfheim is; 1,011 people or 26.7% of the population is 0–19 years old. 915 people or 24.1% are 20–39 years old, and 1,219 people or 32.2% are 40–64 years old. The senior population distribution is 467 people or 12.3% are 65–79 years old, 143 or 3.8% are 80–89 years old and 34 people or 0.9% of the population are 90+ years old.

In Schüpfheim about 64.2% of the population (between age 25-64) have completed either non-mandatory upper secondary education or additional higher education (either university or a Fachhochschule).

As of 2000 there are 1,297 households, of which 329 households (or about 25.4%) contain only a single individual. 231 or about 17.8% are large households, with at least five members. As of 2000 there were 807 inhabited buildings in the municipality, of which 496 were built only as housing, and 311 were mixed use buildings. There were 334 single family homes, 89 double family homes, and 73 multi-family homes in the municipality. Most homes were either two (273) or three (170) story structures. There were only 27 single story buildings and 26 four or more story buildings.

Schüpfheim has an unemployment rate of 1.17%. As of 2005, there were 506 people employed in the primary economic sector and about 191 businesses involved in this sector. 473 people are employed in the secondary sector and there are 57 businesses in this sector. 923 people are employed in the tertiary sector, with 102 businesses in this sector. As of 2000 46.9% of the population of the municipality were employed in some capacity. At the same time, females made up 39.5% of the workforce.

In the 2000 census the religious membership of Schüpfheim was; 3,399 (87.2%) were Roman Catholic, and 203 (5.2%) were Protestant, with an additional 61 (1.57%) that were of some other Christian faith. There are 43 individuals (1.1% of the population) who are Muslim. Of the rest; there were 9 (0.23%) individuals who belong to another religion, 40 (1.03%) who do not belong to any organized religion, 142 (3.64%) who did not answer the question.
