= Entlebuch =

- Municipality
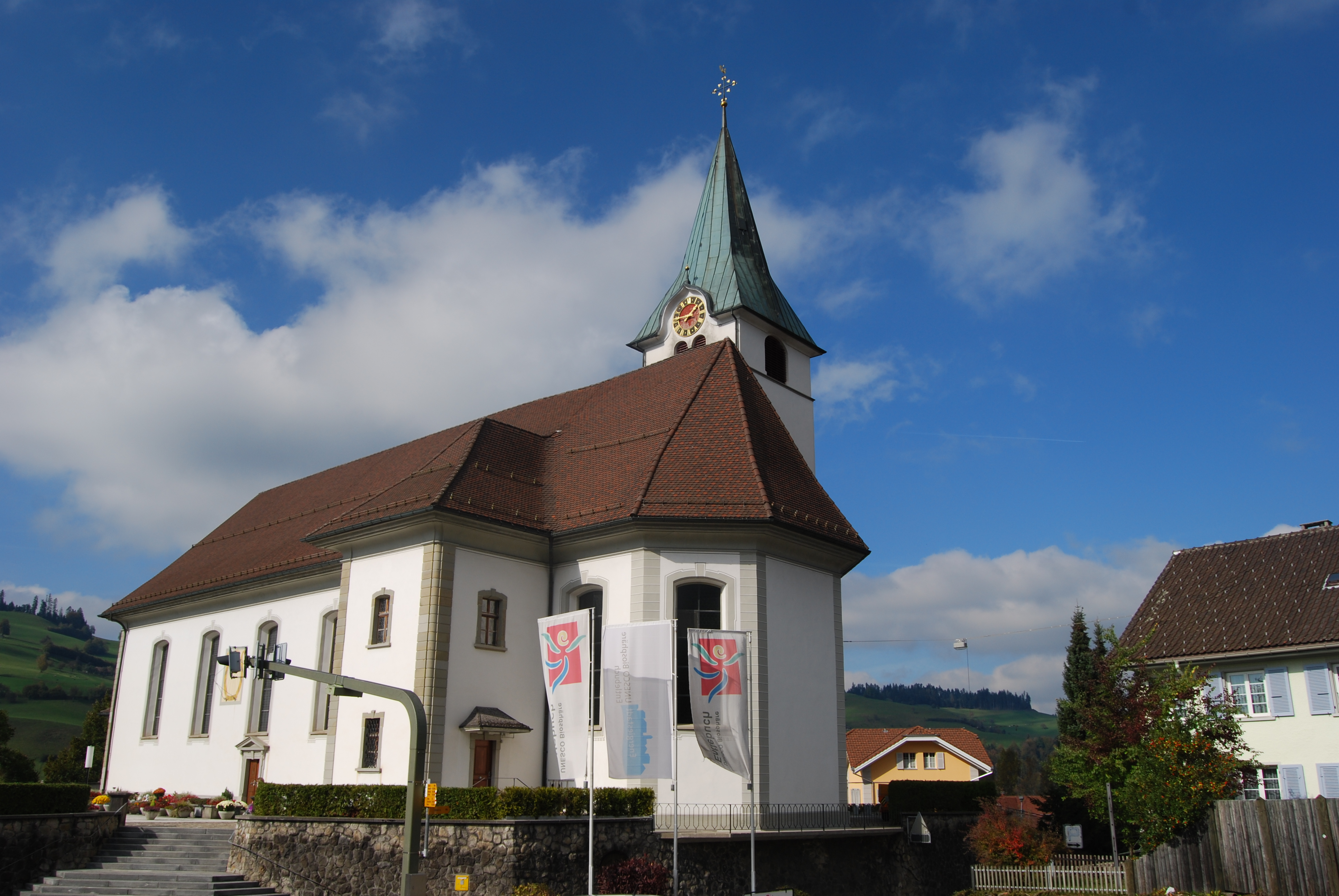

- Flag Coat of arms
- Location of Entlebuch
- Location within Switzerland Location within Canton of Lucerne
- Coordinates: 47°0′N 8°4′E
- Country: Switzerland
- Canton: Lucerne
- District: Entlebuch

Government
  - Mayor: Hansruedi Lipp

Area
  - Total: 56.90 km^{2} (21.97 sq mi)
- Elevation: 723 m (2,372 ft)

Population (December 2020)
  - Total: 3,230
  - Density: 56.8/km^{2} (147/sq mi)
- Time zone: UTC+01:00 (CET)
  - Summer (DST): UTC+02:00 (CEST)
- Postal code: 6160-6162-6163
- SFOS number: 1002
- ISO 3166 code: CH-LU
- Surrounded by: Doppleschwand, Hasle, Malters, Schwarzenberg, Werthenstein, Wolhusen, Alpnach(OW), Sarnen(OW)
- Website: www.entlebuch.ch

Entlebuch is a municipality in the canton of Lucerne in Switzerland. It is the seat of the district of Entlebuch. The area has been designated a Biosphere Reserve by UNESCO in 2001.

== History ==
Entlebuch is first mentioned in 1157, as Entilibuoch, Entelinbuoch. It was in possession of St. Blasien monastery at the time, later passing to the local lords of Wolhusen, who sold it to the House of Habsburg before 1300. It was held by a number of Habsburg reeves during the 14th century, until the Habsburgs lost control of the area to Lucerne following the Battle of Sempach (1386). Entlebuch received the right to hold a market in 1513. From 1596 it was the administrative seat of Entlebuch bailiwick (predecessor of the modern Entlebuch District). A fulling mill was built in 1651, a dyeing mill in 1720. A new church was built in 1776–1780. More textile manufactories were built in the 1840s to 1850s by Johann Ackermann, united into a textile company in 1867 (the factory ceased production in 1971, the company survives as Ackermann Versandhaus AG A hydroelectric plant for the factory was built in 1905 and remains operational. The municipality was established in 1798. Settlement of the Entle valley commenced relatively late, with a population of about 2,200 in the 1450s, 5,400 in 1715 (Entlebuch parish: 1,470 in 1745). Population in Entlebuch municipality rose during the first half of the 19th century, from 1,830 in 1798 to 3,085 in 1850, as a result of industrialisation. It declined again after 1850, reaching 2,677 in 1900, and rose again only slightly during the 20th century, to 3,366 in 2000.

== Geography ==
Aerial view from 300 m by Walter Mittelholzer (1922)

Entlebuch has an area of 57 km^{2} (22 sq mi). Of this area, 50.1% is used for agricultural purposes, while 42.6% is forested. Of the rest of the land, 3.7% is settled (buildings or roads) and the remainder (3.6%) is non-productive (rivers, glaciers or mountains). In the 1997 land survey, 42.61% of the total land area was forested. Of the agricultural land, 48.86% is used for farming or pastures, while 1.19% is used for orchards or vine crops. Of the settled areas, 1.86% is covered with buildings, 0.21% is industrial, 0.16% is classed as special developments, 0.02% is parks or greenbelts and 1.46% is transportation infrastructure. Of the unproductive areas, 0.84% is unproductive flowing water (rivers) and 2.79% is other unproductive land.

The municipality is located on the right bank of the Entlen and the Kleine Emme rivers. The village of Entlebuch is located at the confluence of the Entlen into the Emme. It consists of the village of Entlebuch and village sections of Ebnet, Finsterwald, Rengg, Rotmoos, Gfellen (since 1970 a ski resort) and the exclave of Dieplischwand an der Fontanne.

== Demographics ==
Entlebuch has a population (as of 31 December 2020) of 3,230. As of 2007, 4.4% of the population was made up of foreign nationals. Over the last 10 years the population has decreased at a rate of -3.4%. Most of the population (as of 2000) speaks German (96.7%), with Albanian being second most common (0.7%) and Italian being third (0.6%).

In the 2007 election the most popular party was the CVP which received 43% of the vote. The next three most popular parties were the SVP (29.7%), the FDP (21.3%) and the SPS (2.5%).

The age distribution in Entlebuch is; 862 people or 26.2% of the population is 0–19 years old. 815 people or 24.8% are 20–39 years old, and 1,035 people or 31.5% are 40–64 years old. The senior population distribution is 400 people or 12.2% are 65–79 years old, 151 or 4.6% are 80–89 years old and 23 people or 0.7% of the population are 90+ years old. In Entlebuch about 58.5% of the population (between age 25-64) have completed either non-mandatory upper secondary education or additional higher education (either university or a Fachhochschule). As of 2000 there are 1,157 households, of which 326 households (or about 28.2%) contain only a single individual. 211 or about 18.2% are large households, with at least five members. As of 2000 there were 672 inhabited buildings in the municipality, of which 409 were built only as housing, and 263 were mixed use buildings. There were 239 single family homes, 96 double family homes, and 74 multi-family homes in the municipality. Most homes were either two (230) or three (122) story structures. There were only 22 single story buildings and 35 four or more story buildings.

Entlebuch has an unemployment rate of 0.84%. As of 2005, there were 463 people employed in the primary economic sector and about 178 businesses involved in this sector. 399 people are employed in the secondary sector and there are 48 businesses in this sector. 1030 people are employed in the tertiary sector, with 97 businesses in this sector. As of 2000 47% of the population of the municipality were employed in some capacity. At the same time, females made up 38.1% of the workforce.

In the 2000 census the religious membership of Entlebuch was; 2,950 (87.6%) were Roman Catholic, and 148 (4.4%) were Protestant, with an additional 19 (0.56%) that were of some other Christian faith. There are 67 individuals (1.99% of the population) who are Muslim. Of the rest; there were 11 (0.33%) individuals who belong to another religion, 41 (1.22%) who do not belong to any organized religion, 130 (3.86%) who did not answer the question.

The historical population is given in the following table:

year	population
1745	1,470
1798	1,830
1816	2,314
1837	2,741
1850	3,085
1900	2,677
1950	3,190
2000	3,366

== Weather ==
Entlebuch has an average of 150.5 days of rain per year and on average receives 1,487 mm (58.5 in) of precipitation. The wettest month is August during which time Entlebuch receives an average of 173 mm (6.8 in) of precipitation. During this month there is precipitation for an average of 13.2 days. The month with the most days of precipitation is May, with an average of 15.1, but with only 148 mm (5.8 in) of precipitation. The driest month of the year is October with an average of 91 mm (3.6 in) of precipitation over 13.2 days.

== See also ==
- Entlebuch Biosphere
- Napfgebiet
- Battle of Sörenberg
