= Kleine Emme =

River in Switzerland

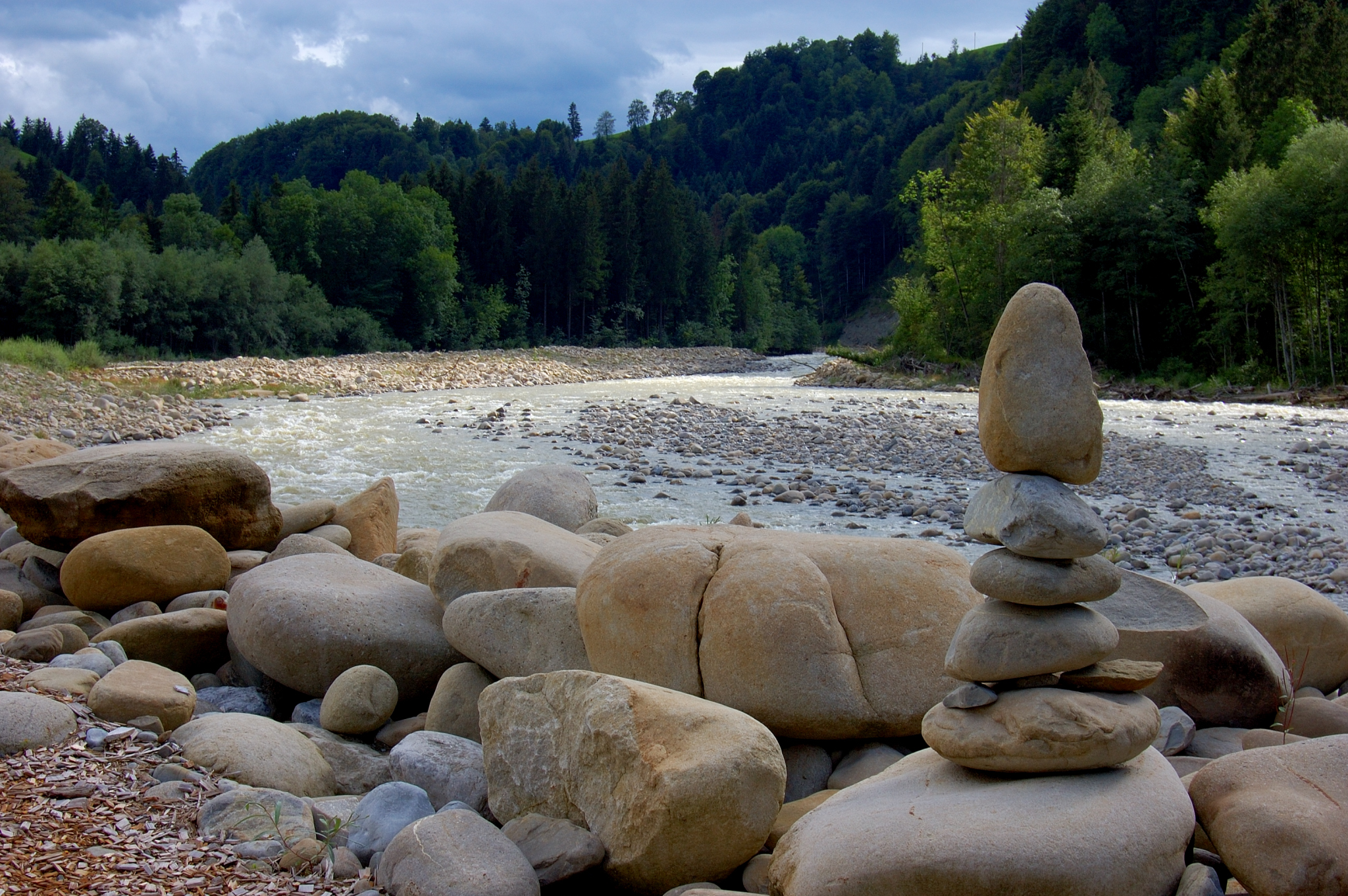
- Alluvial zone

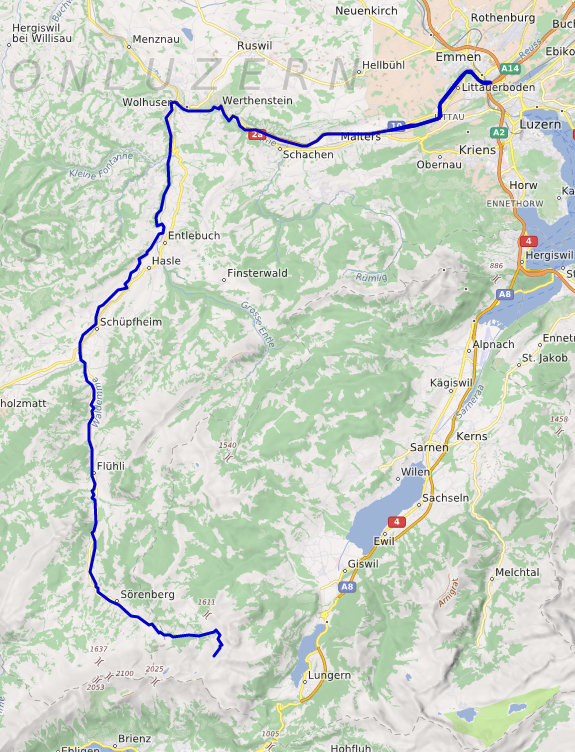

Location
- Country: Switzerland

Physical characteristics
- Source: Emmensprung
  - coordinates: 46°48′38″N 8°6′0″E
- Mouth: Reuss
  - coordinates: 47°4′1″N 8°17′15″E

Basin features
- Progression: Reuss→ Aare→ Rhine→ North Sea

The Kleine Emme is a river of the canton of Lucerne, Switzerland, a left tributary of the Reuss extending for 58 km, draining a basin of 478 km². It is not to be confused with the Emme of the canton of Bern. The Kleine Emme rises as the Waldemme in the southwestern corner of the canton of Obwalden, in the Brienzer Rothorn massif at the Emmensprung, flowing north-west along the Mariental, past Sörenberg. Turning north, it enters the Entlebuch region, where it is joined by the Weissemme near Schüpfheim and by the Entlen at Entlebuch. After receiving the Fontannen, it turns to the east at Wolhusen where it is joined by the Wigger and later by the Rümlig. From here, it flows parallel to the Pilatus chain, past Malters, joining the Reuss at Emmen, 2 km downstream of Lake Lucerne.

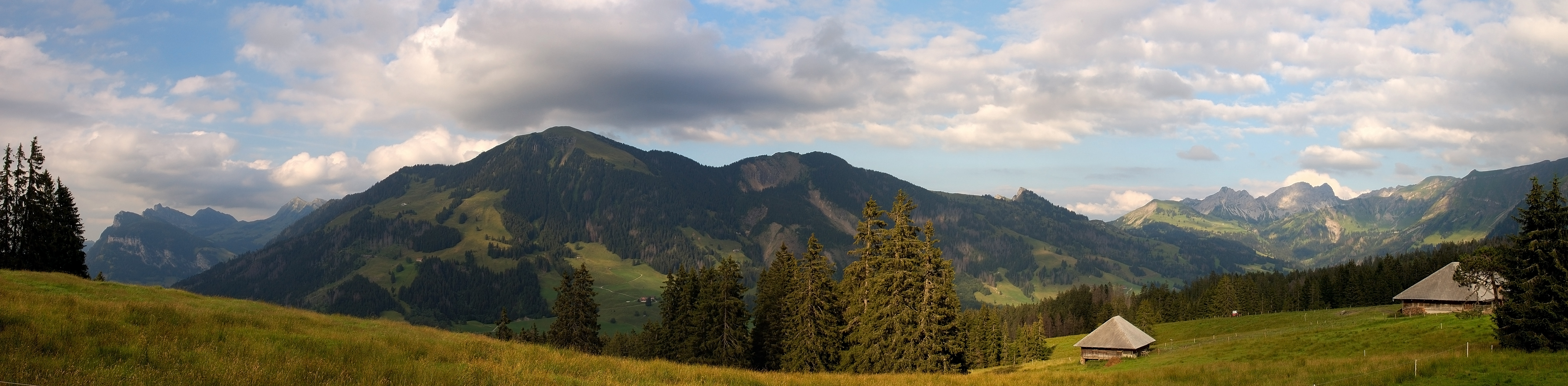
Valley of the Waldemme, mainstream of the Kleine Emme

== See also ==
- List of rivers of Switzerland
