= Interlaken District =

Coordinates: 46.6833°N 7.86667°E

Interlaken District Amtsbezirk Interlaken
- District
- Flag Coat of arms

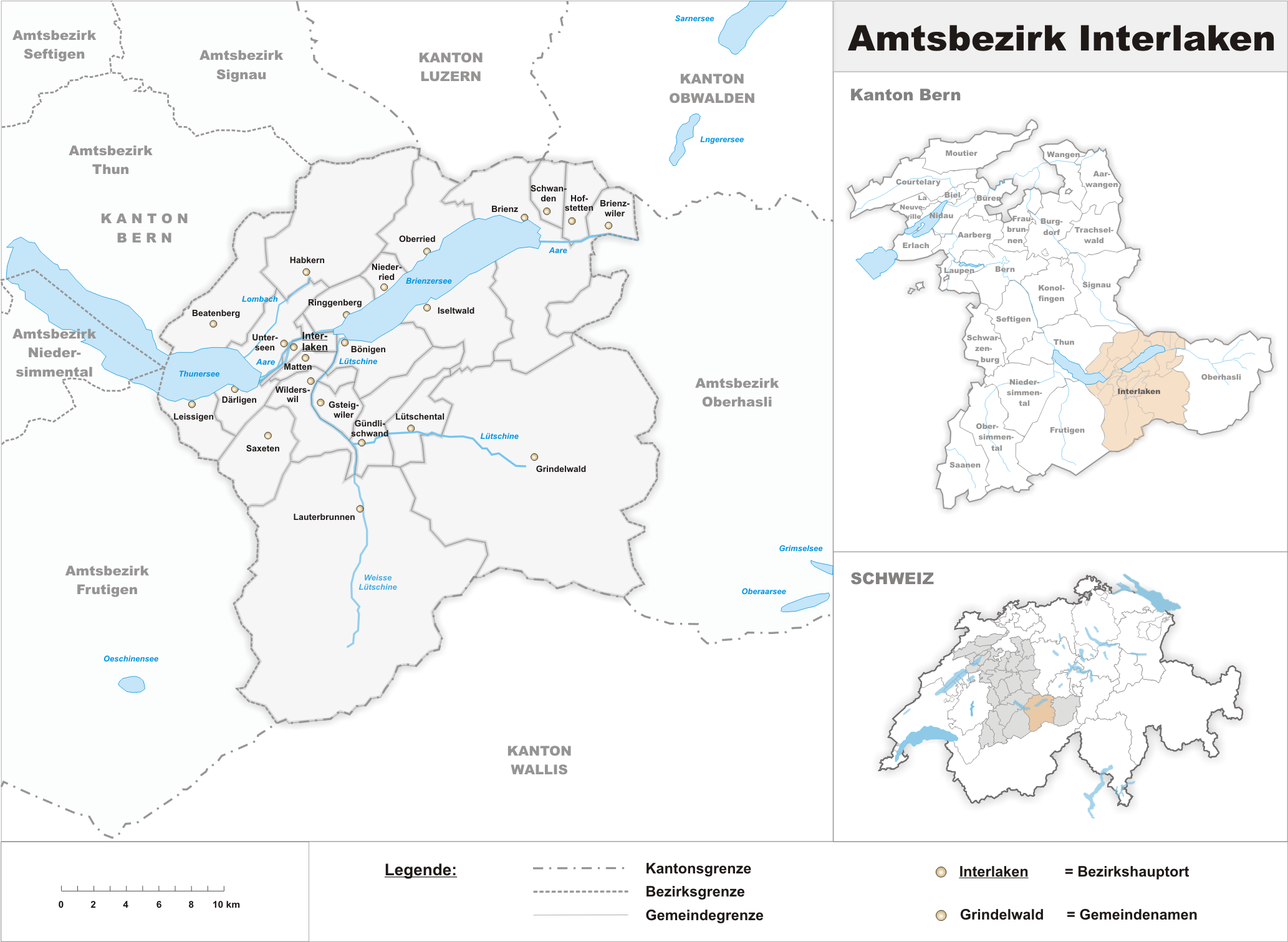
- Country: Switzerland
- Canton: Bern
- Capital: Interlaken

Area
  - Total: 681 km^{2} (263 sq mi)

Population (2007)
  - Total: 38,156
  - Density: 56.0/km^{2} (145/sq mi)
- Time zone: UTC+1 (CET)
  - Summer (DST): UTC+2 (CEST)
- Municipalities: 23

Interlaken is a district of the canton of Bern.

From 1 January 2010, the district lost its administrative power while being replaced by the Interlaken-Oberhasli, whose administrative centre is Interlaken. Since 2010, it remains therefore a fully recognised district under the law and the Constitution (Art.3 al.2) of the Canton of Berne.

Its administrative capital was Interlaken. It comprises 23 municipalities with a total area of 724 km^{2}:

- CH-3803 Beatenberg
- CH-3806 Bönigen
- CH-3855 Brienz
- CH-3856 Brienzwiler
- CH-3707 Därligen
- CH-3818 Grindelwald
- CH-3814 Gsteigwiler
- CH-3815 Gündlischwand
- CH-3804 Habkern
- CH-3858 Hofstetten bei Brienz
- CH-3800 Interlaken
- CH-3807 Iseltwald
- CH-3822 Lauterbrunnen
- CH-3706 Leissigen
- CH-3816 Lütschental
- CH-3800 Matten bei Interlaken
- CH-3853 Niederried bei Interlaken
- CH-3854 Oberried am Brienzersee
- CH-3852 Ringgenberg
- CH-3813 Saxeten
- CH-3855 Schwanden bei Brienz
- CH-3800 Unterseen
- CH-3812 Wilderswil
