= Wilerhorn =

Wilerhorn may refer to:

- Wilerhorn (Bernese Alps), a mountain in the Bernese Alps and the Swiss canton of Valais
- Wilerhorn (Emmental Alps), a mountain in the Emmental Alps and on the border between the Swiss cantons of Bern and Obwalden
