= Schönbüel =

Mountain in Switzerland

- Location within Switzerland

Highest point
- Elevation: 2,011 m (6,598 ft)
- Coordinates: 46°47′15.6″N 8°05′55″E

Geography
- Location: Obwalden, Switzerland
- Parent range: Emmental Alps

Climbing
- Easiest route: Cable car

Schönbüel is a prominence east of the Höch Gumme in the Emmental Alps. It can be accessed by cable car from Lungern.
