= Höch Gumme =

Mountain in Switzerland

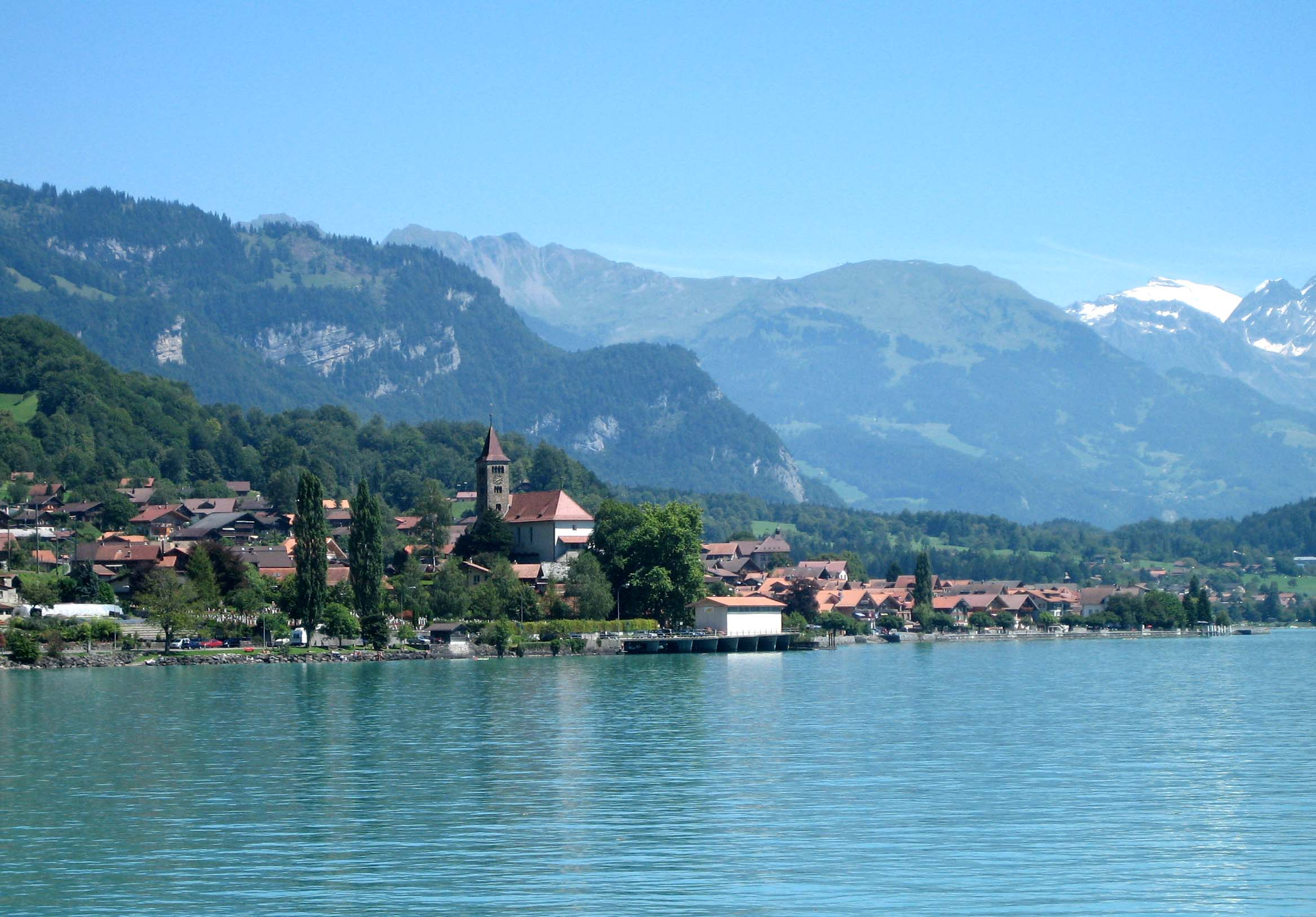

Highest point
- Elevation: 2,205 m (7,234 ft)
- Prominence: 140 m (460 ft)
- Parent peak: Arnihaaggen (2,212 m)
- Coordinates: 46°47′15.5″N 8°05′24.3″E

Geography
- Location within Switzerland
- Location: Obwalden/Bern, Switzerland
- Parent range: Emmental Alps

The Höch Gumme (2,205 m) is a mountain of the Emmental Alps in Switzerland. It lies to the east of the Brienzer Rothorn and Arnihaaggen, and the west of the Wilerhorn and Brünig Pass. The Schönbüel cable car station (2,011 m) is on its eastern flank.

Administratively, the summit is shared between the municipalities of Giswil, to the north-west, Lungern to the east, and Hofstetten bei Brienz, to the south. Hofstetten bei Brienz is in the canton of Bern, whilst Giswil and Lungern are in the canton of Obwalden.
