= Tannhorn =

Mountain in Switzerland

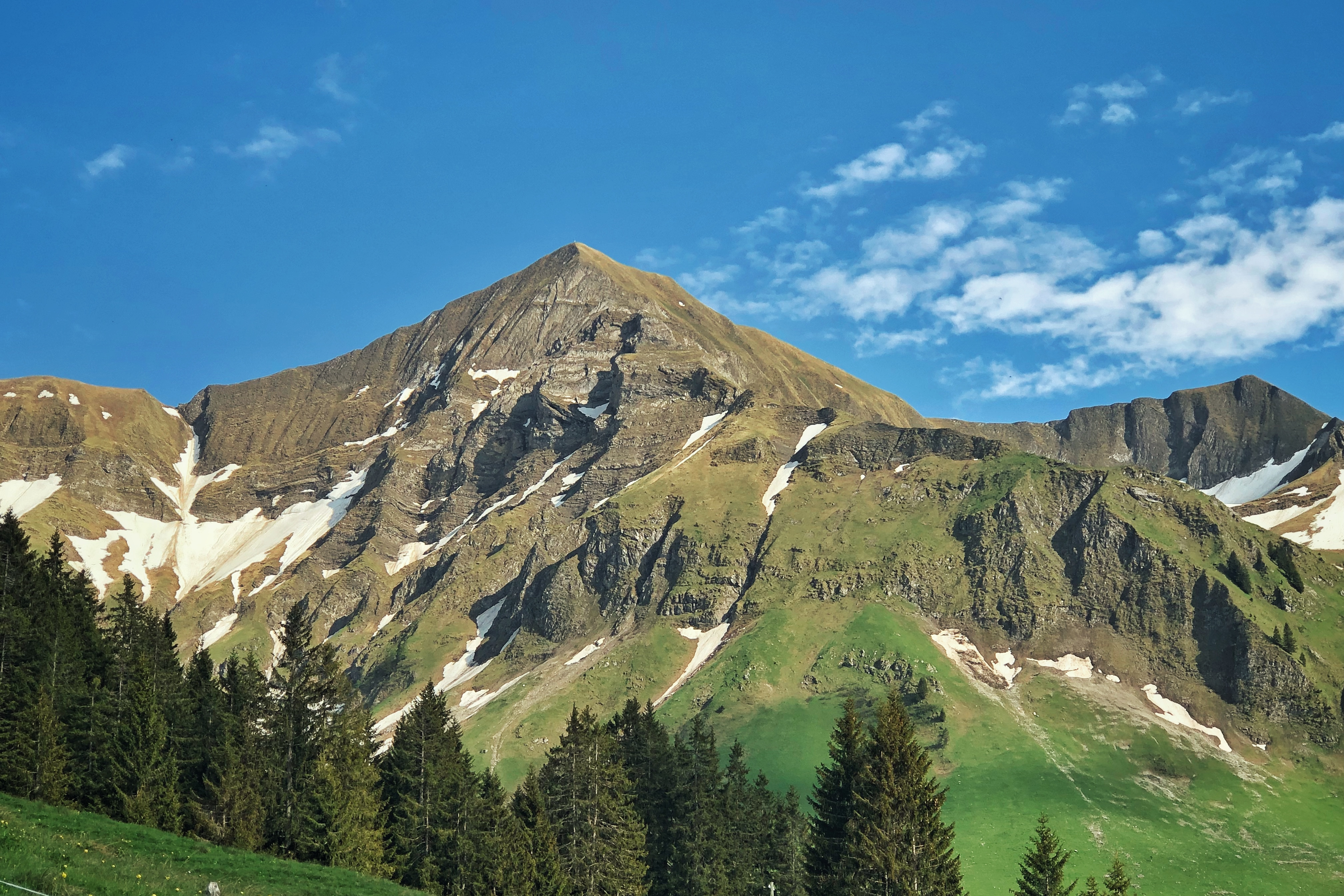
- Tannhorn north side near Tannigsboden.

Highest point
- Elevation: 2,221 m (7,287 ft)
- Prominence: 168 m (551 ft)
- Parent peak: Brienzer Rothorn
- Coordinates: 46°46′29.4″N 7°59′03.8″E

Geography
- Location within Switzerland
- Location: Lucerne/Bern, Switzerland
- Parent range: Emmental Alps

The Tannhorn is a mountain of the Emmental Alps in Switzerland. It lies to the west of the Brienzer Rothorn and to the east of the Augstmatthorn. On its southern side it overlooks Lake Brienz.

Administratively, the summit is shared by the municipalities of Brienz, to the south and east, Oberried am Brienzersee, to the west, and Flühli, to the north-east. Brienz and Oberried am Brienzersee are in the canton of Bern, whilst Flühli is in the canton of Lucerne. The Tannhorn is the southernmost point in the canton of Lucerne.
