= Brienzer Rothorn =

Mountain of the Emmental Alps

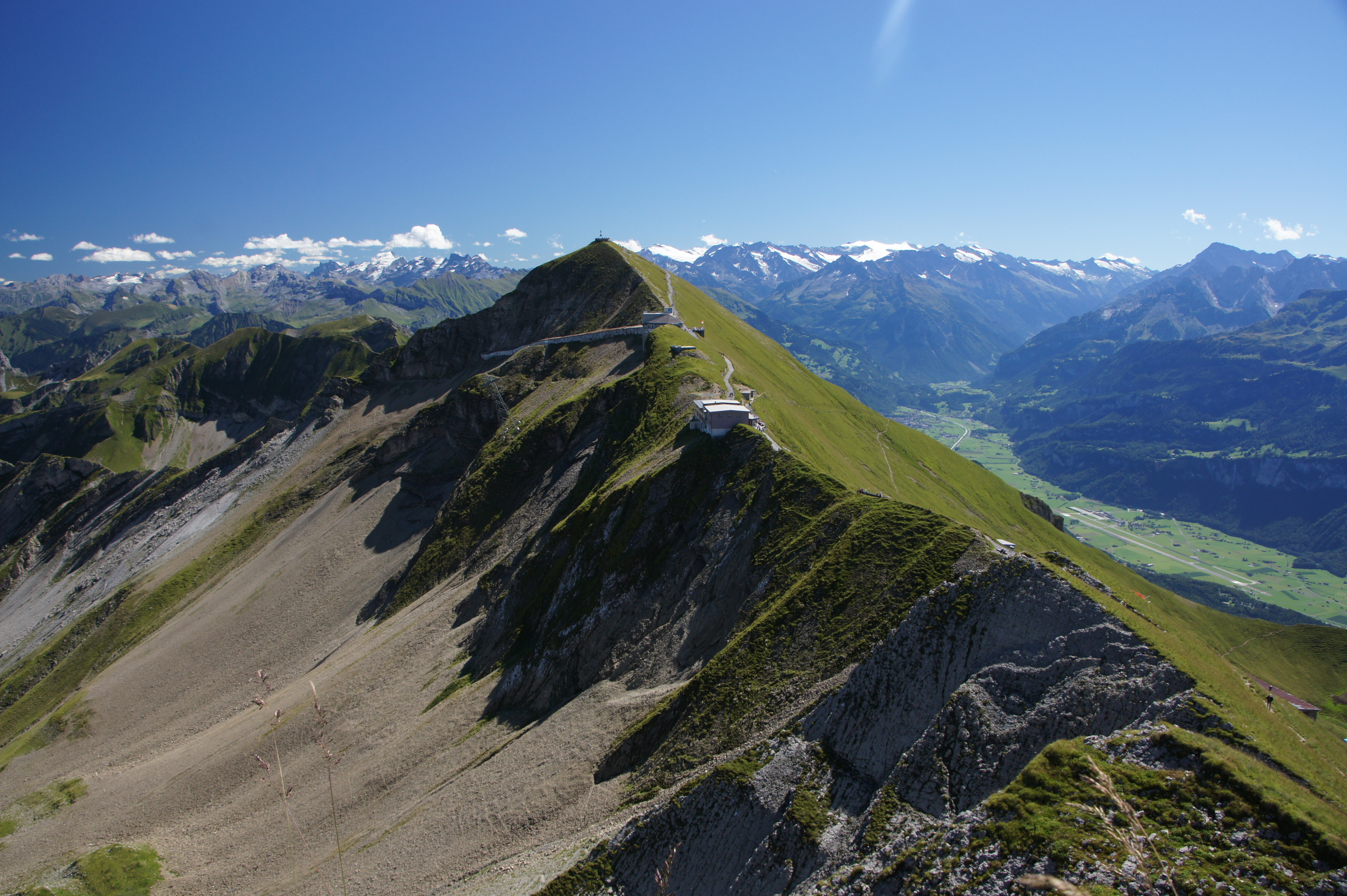
- View from the west

Highest point
- Elevation: 2,350 m (7,710 ft)
- Prominence: 1,342 m (4,403 ft)
- Isolation: 9.7 km (6.0 mi)
- Listing: Canton high point
- Coordinates: 46°47′13″N 8°02′49″E

Naming
- English translation: Red Horn of Brienz
- Language of name: German

Geography
- Location within Switzerland
- Country: Switzerland
- Cantons: Lucerne; Obwalden; Bern
- Parent range: Emmental Alps
- Topo map: Swiss Federal Office of Topography swisstopo

Climbing
- Easiest route: mountain train from Brienz, cable car from Sörenberg

The Brienzer Rothorn is a mountain of the Emmental Alps, in Switzerland. With an elevation of 2,350 metres (7,710 ft) above sea level, the Brienzer Rothorn is the highest summit of the range. To its west lies the Tannhorn, whilst to its east are Arnihaaggen, Höch Gumme and the Brünig Pass (1,008 metres (3,307 ft)). On its south side it overlooks Lake Brienz, whilst to the north it looks out over the Waldemme valley.

Administratively, the summit is shared by the municipalities of Brienz, to the south-west, Schwanden bei Brienz, to the south-east, Giswil to the north-east, and Flühli, to the north-west. Brienz and Schwanden bei Brienz are in the canton of Bern, Giswil is in the canton of Obwalden, and Flühli is in the canton of Lucerne. The Brienzer Rothorn is the highest point in the canton of Lucerne.

The summit can be reached from Brienz by the Brienz Rothorn Bahn (steam train), the summit station being located at 2,244 metres (7,362 ft) on the Bernese side. It can also be reached from Sörenberg, in Flühli, by cable car.

== Gallery ==
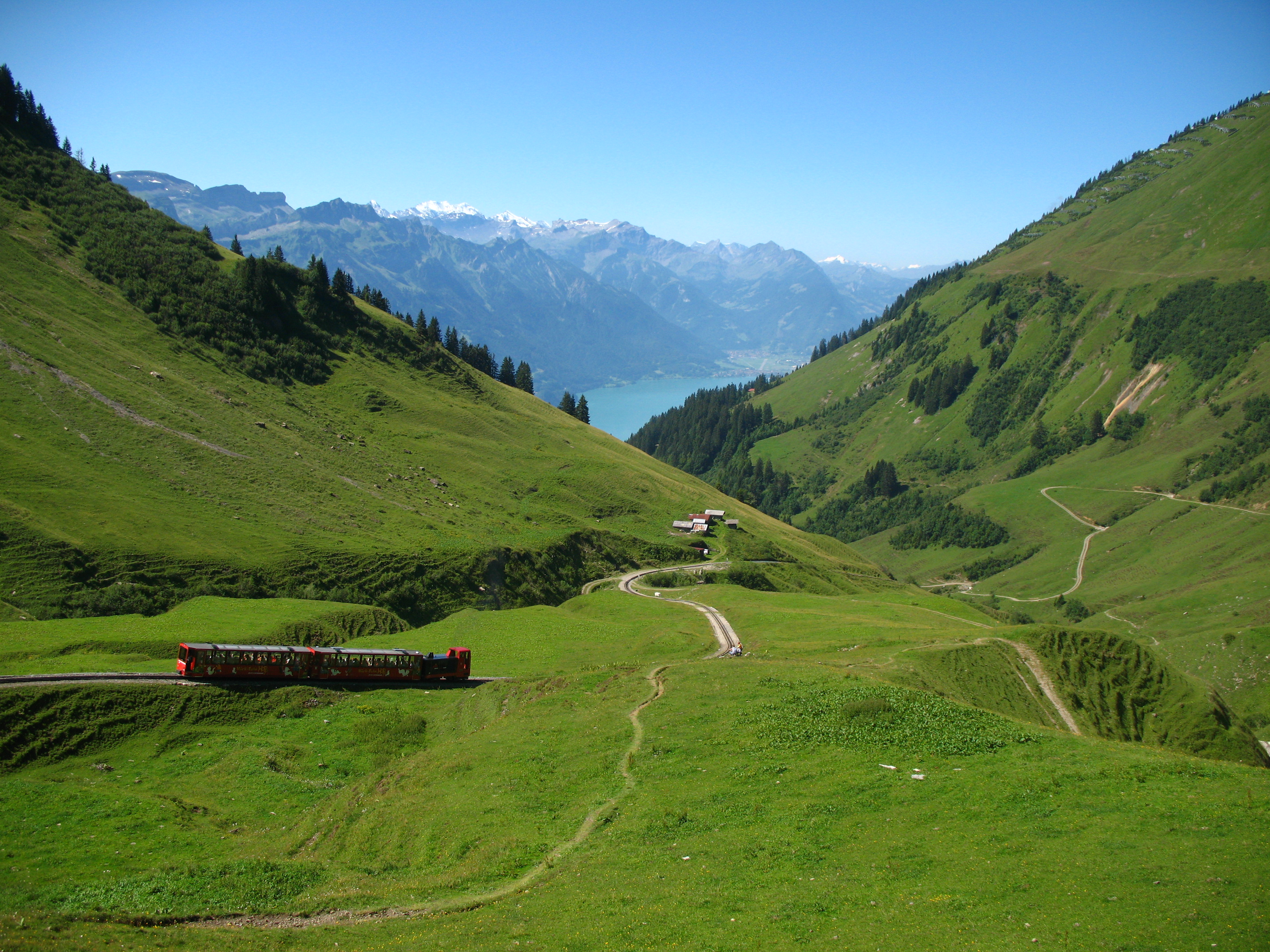
Steam train (Brienzer Rothorn Bahn) on the Planalp near Mittler Stafel

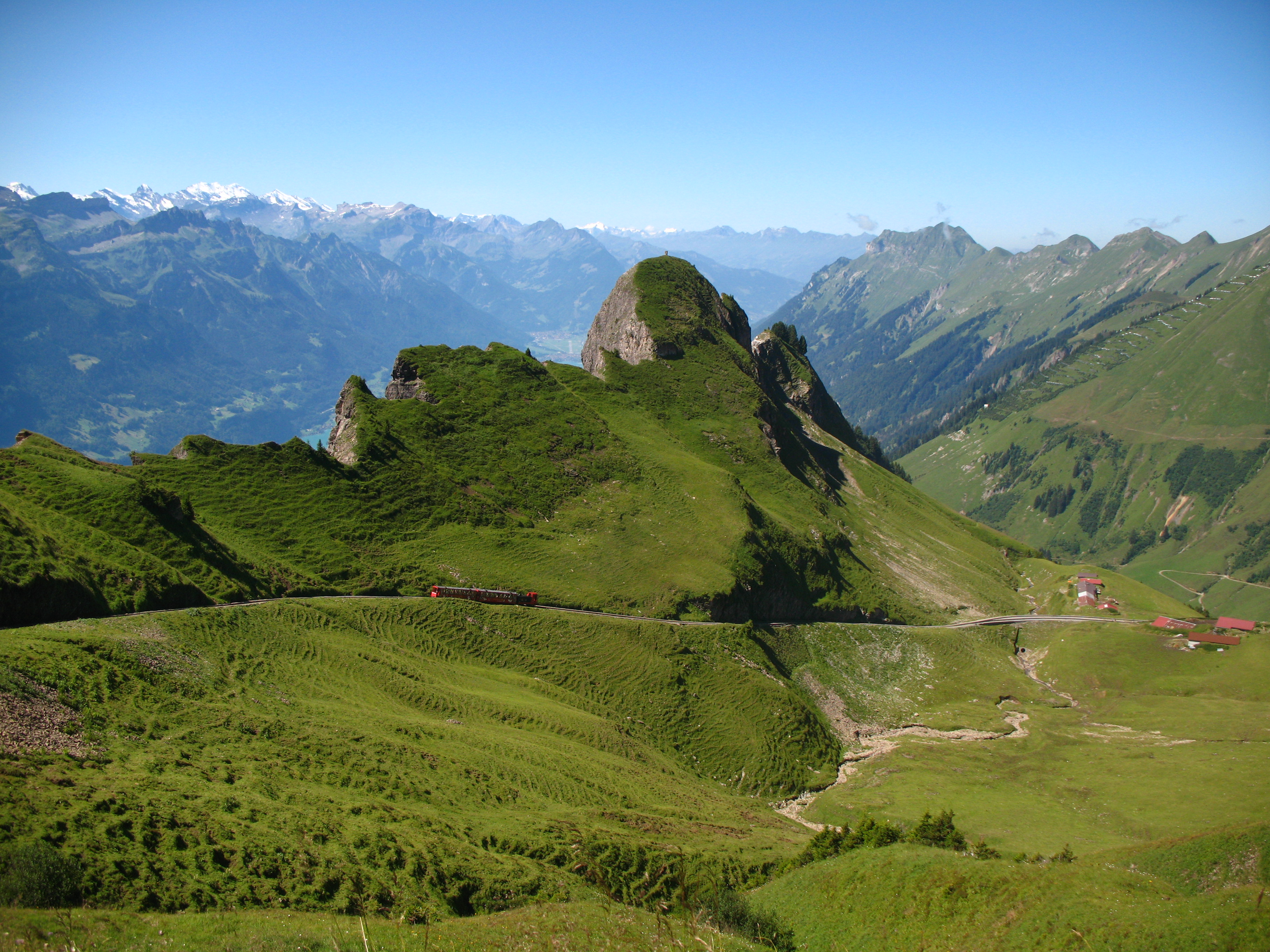
Approaching the summit near Ober Stafel

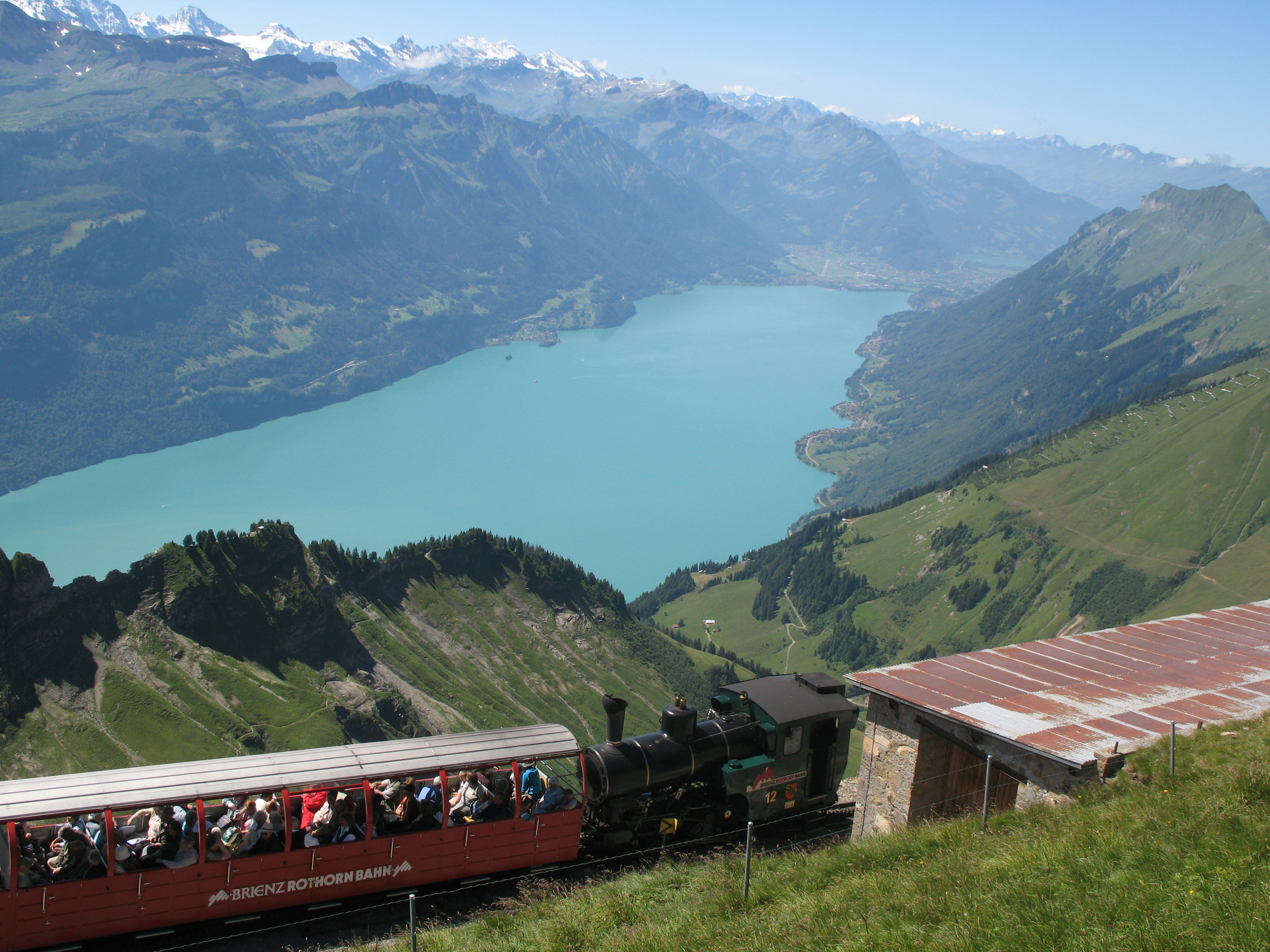
View of Lake Brienz and Interlaken in the background

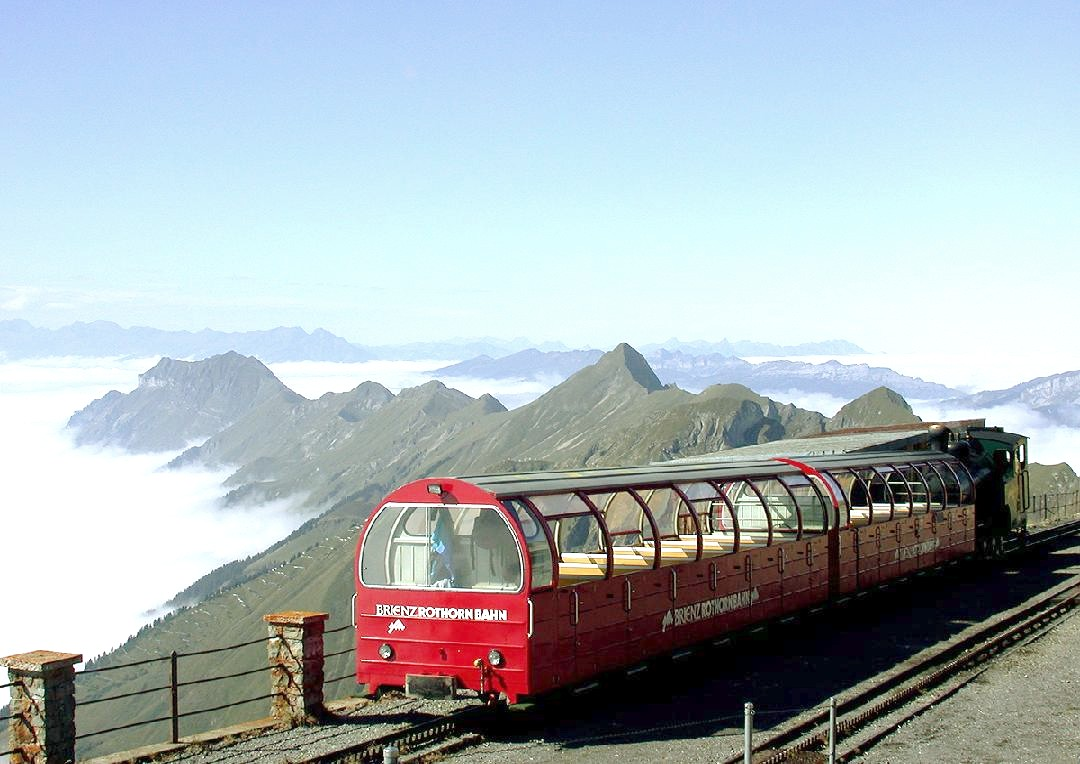
The summit station over the clouds ("sea of fog") during a day in August

== See also ==
- List of mountains of Switzerland
- List of mountains of Switzerland accessible by public transport
