= Giswil =

- Municipality
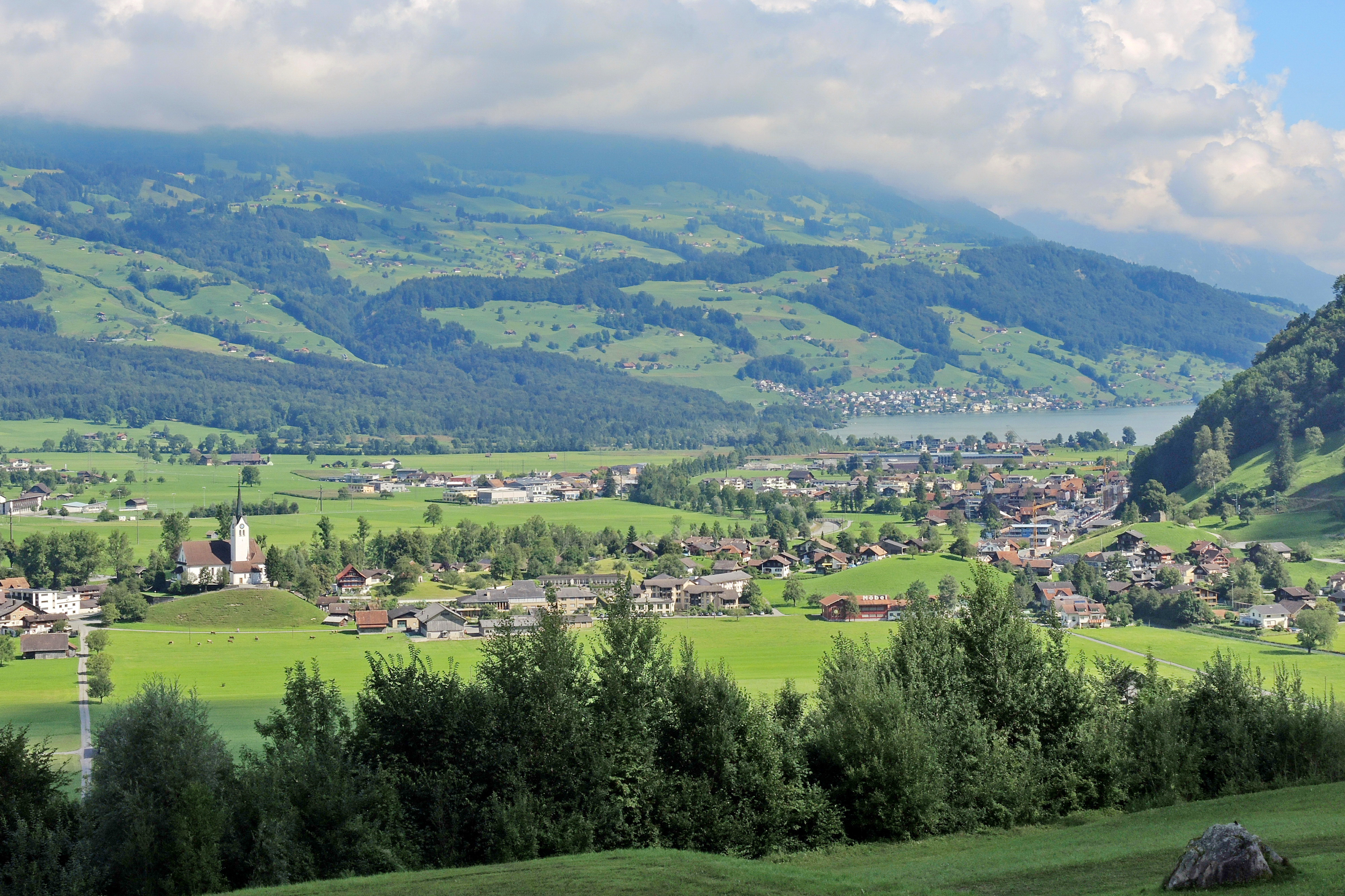
- Giswil and Sarnersee as seen from Brünigstrasse in August 2016

- Flag Coat of arms
- Location of Giswil
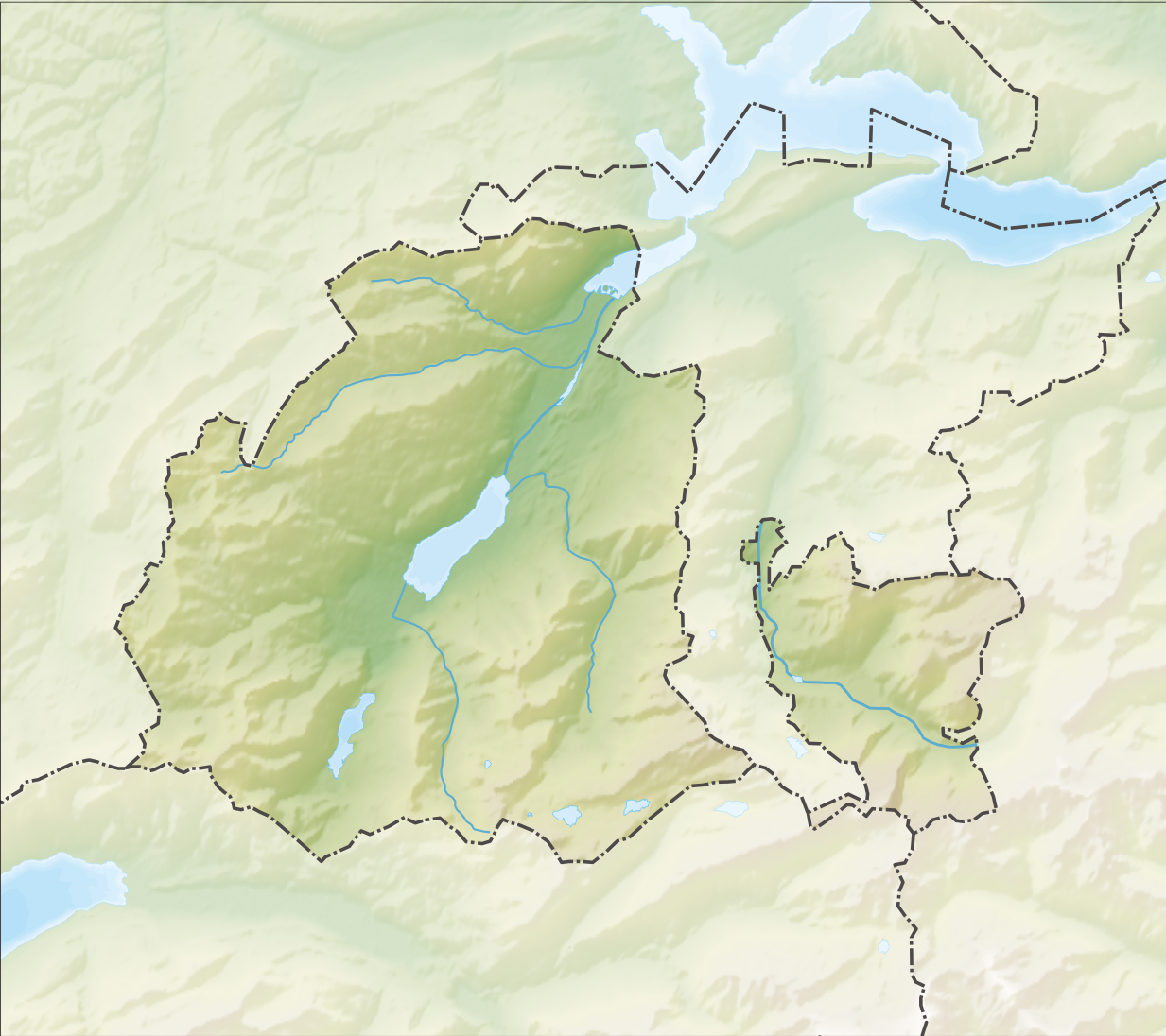
- Location within Switzerland Location within Canton of Obwalden
- Coordinates: 46°50′N 8°11′E
- Country: Switzerland
- Canton: Obwalden
- District: n.a.

Area
  - Total: 78.18 km^{2} (30.19 sq mi)
- Elevation: 485 m (1,591 ft)

Population (December 2020)
  - Total: 3,676
  - Density: 47.02/km^{2} (121.8/sq mi)
- Time zone: UTC+01:00 (CET)
  - Summer (DST): UTC+02:00 (CEST)
- Postal code: 6074
- SFOS number: 1403
- ISO 3166 code: CH-OW
- Surrounded by: Flühli (LU), Hofstetten bei Brienz (BE), Lungern, Sachseln, Sarnen, Schwanden bei Brienz (BE)
- Website: www.giswil.ch

Giswil is a municipality in the canton of Obwalden in Switzerland.

== History ==
Giswil is first mentioned in the 11th century, as Kisevilare.

== Geography ==
Aerial view from 1600 m by Walter Mittelholzer (1919)

The municipality is located on the southern end of Lake Sarnen. It consists of the village sections of Grossteil, Kleinteil, Rudenz and Diechtersmatt, as well as scattered farm houses and hamlets. To the south-west, the municipality rises up to the summits of the Giswilerstock, Brienzer Rothorn, Arnihaaggen and Höch Gumme. The Glaubenbielen Pass crosses to Sörenberg in the Entlebuch region of the canton of Lucerne.

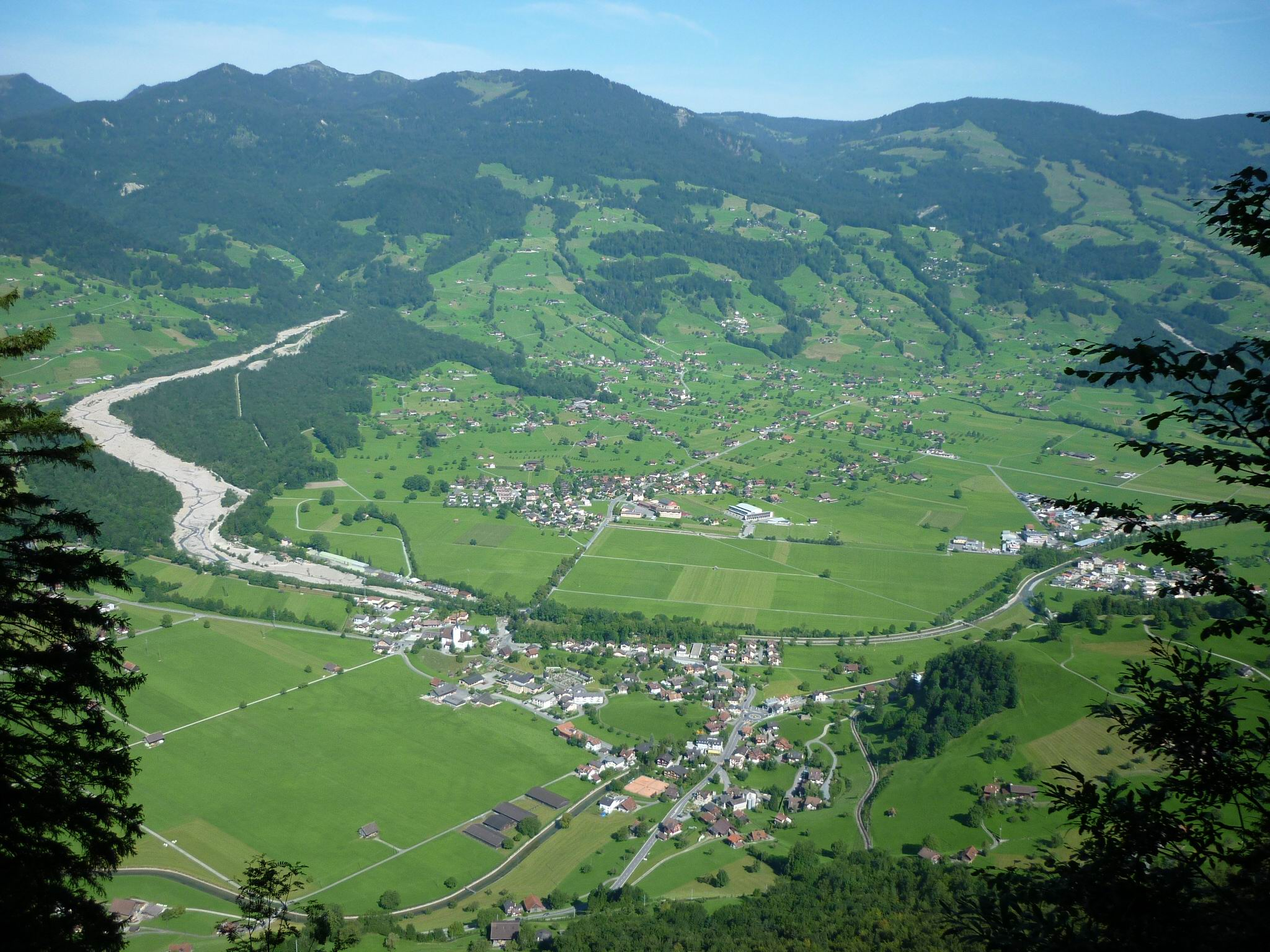
View of Giswil from neighboring mountains

Giswil has an area, as of 2006, of 85.9 square kilometers (33.2 sq mi). Of this area, 35.9% is used for agricultural purposes, while 53.3% is forested. Of the rest of the land, 2.2% is settled (buildings or roads) and the remainder (8.7%) is non-productive (rivers, glaciers, or mountains).

== Demographics ==
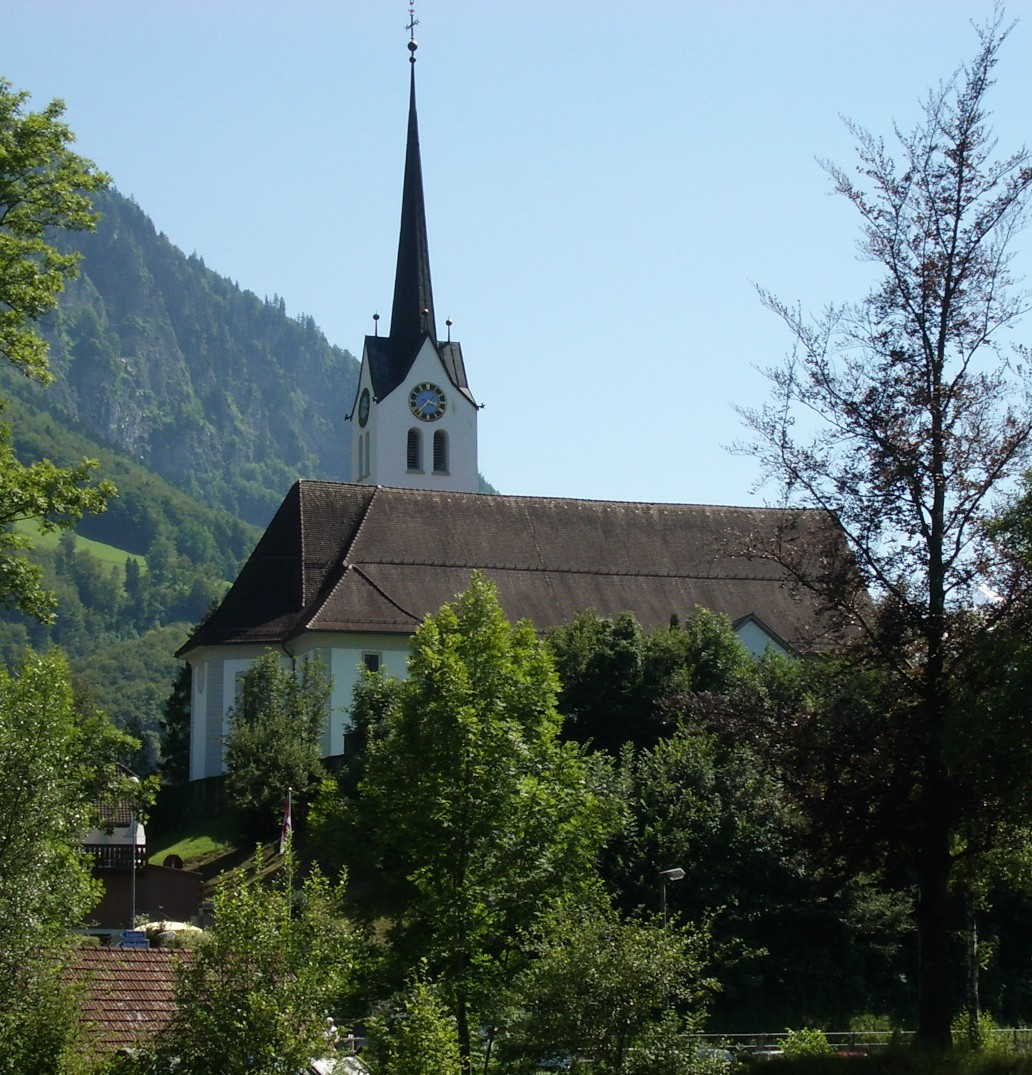
Roman Catholic church of Giswil

Giswil has a population (as of 31 December 2020) of 3,676. As of 2007, 8.9% of the population was made up of foreign nationals. After a period of poverty and emigration in the late 19th century, where the population stagnated at about 1600 persons, the population increased quite continuously in the 20th century. Over the past 40 years the population has increased by 38%, mainly because economic conditions in the region and public transport to Luzern have improved so that the migration balance definitely changed its sense towards immigration. Most of the population (as of 2000) speaks German (95.5%), with Serbo-Croatian being second most common ( 1.0%) and Portuguese being third ( 0.8%). As of 2000 the gender distribution of the population was 50.9% male and 49.1% female. As of 2000 there are 1,250 households in Giswil.

In the 2007 federal election the most popular party was the SVP which received 35.9% of the vote. The next three most popular parties were the CVP (26.2%), the SPS (19.4%) and the rest of the votes went to other parties (18.6%).

In Giswil about 68.2% of the population (between age 25–64) have completed either non-mandatory upper secondary education or additional higher education (either university or a Fachhochschule).

Giswil has an unemployment rate of 1.24%. As of 2005, there were 329 people employed in the primary economic sector and about 125 businesses involved in this sector. 335 people are employed in the secondary sector and there are 53 businesses in this sector. 467 people are employed in the tertiary sector, with 84 businesses in this sector.

The historical population is given in the following table:

year	population
1744	1,040
1850	1,610
1900	1,711
1950	2,642
1990	3,085
2000	3,435

== Transport ==
Giswil is served by Giswil station on the Brünig line, an inter-regional narrow-gauge railway from Interlaken to Lucerne. The hourly InterRegio train between Interlaken and Lucerne stops at the station, which is also the terminus of the half-hourly Lucerne S-Bahn S5 service from Lucerne.

The A8 motorway passes to the south of the town, through the Giswil Tunnel.

== Sights ==
The main sights of Giswil are two ruins (Rosenberg and Rudenz), as well as traditional farmhouses in the scattered settlement Grossteil.

== Weather ==
Giswil has an average of 144.1 days of rain per year and on average receives 1,311 mm (51.6 in) of precipitation. The wettest month is August during which time Giswil receives an average of 168 mm (6.6 in) of precipitation. During this month there is precipitation for an average of 14.4 days. The month with the most days of precipitation is June, with an average of 14.4, but with only 146 mm (5.7 in) of precipitation. The driest month of the year is January with an average of 79 mm (3.1 in) of precipitation over 14.4 days.

== Notable persons ==
- John Ming, priest
