= Schwanden bei Brienz =

- Municipality
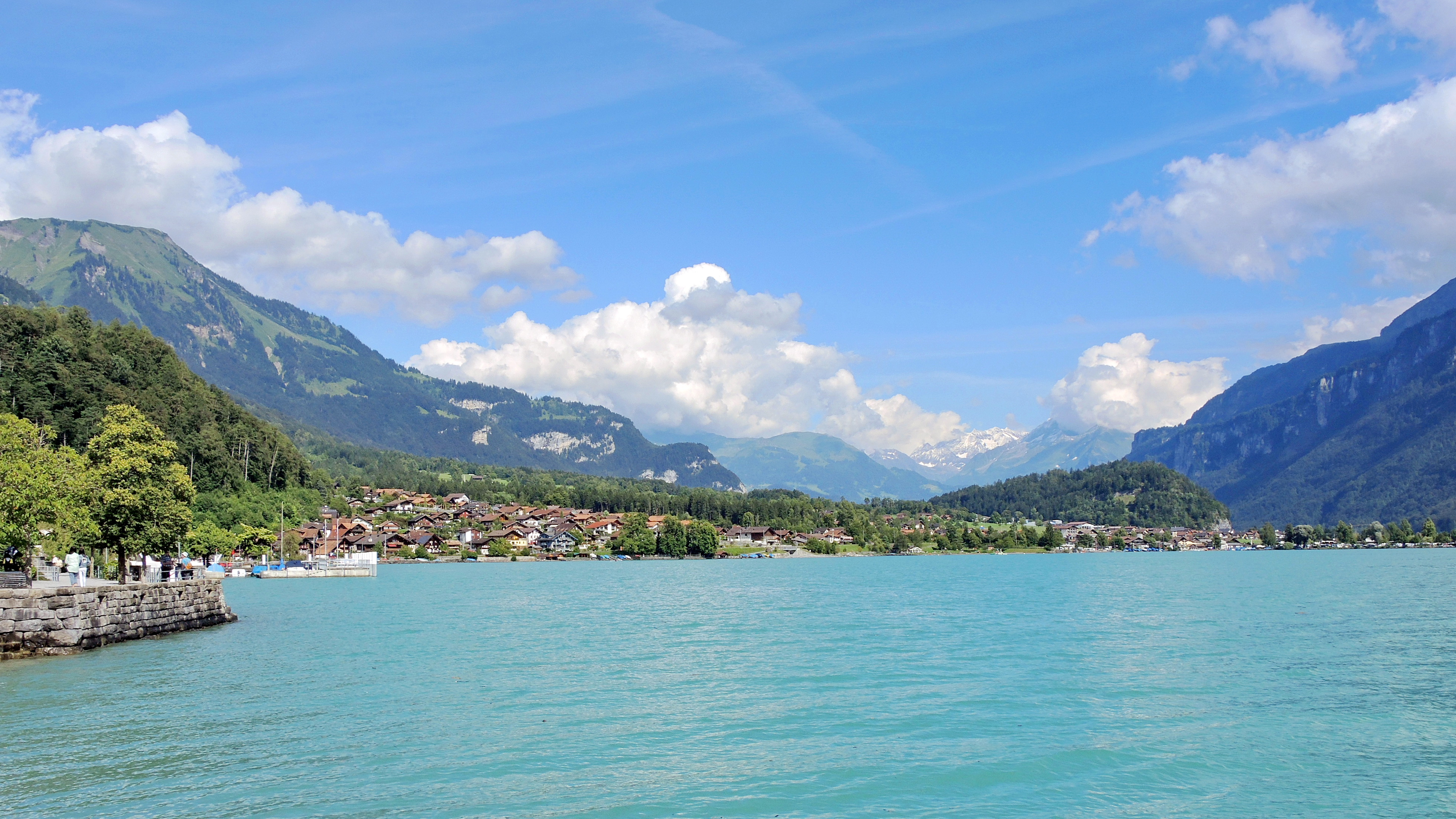
- Schwanden bei Brienz village on the Brienzersee

- Flag Coat of arms
- Location of Schwanden bei Brienz
- Location within Switzerland Location within Canton of Bern
- Coordinates: 46°45′N 8°3′E
- Country: Switzerland
- Canton: Bern
- District: Interlaken-Oberhasli

Government
  - Executive: Gemeinderat with 7 members
  - Mayor: Gemeindepräsident(in); Anton Reisacher (as of 2026)

Area
  - Total: 7.1 km^{2} (2.7 sq mi)
- Elevation: 659 m (2,162 ft)

Population (December 2020)
  - Total: 625
  - Density: 88/km^{2} (230/sq mi)
- Time zone: UTC+01:00 (CET)
  - Summer (DST): UTC+02:00 (CEST)
- Postal code: 3855
- SFOS number: 592
- ISO 3166 code: CH-BE
- Surrounded by: Giswil, Hofstetten bei Brienz, Brienz and Flühli
- Website: https://www.schwandenbrienz.ch/

Schwanden bei Brienz (until 1911 officially named Schwanden) is a municipality in the Interlaken-Oberhasli administrative district in the canton of Bern in Switzerland.

The blazon of the municipal coat of arms is Per Pile Or and Gules three Pales wavy Argent.

== Origin of the name ==
Schwanden is a name of a clearing, that was applied to the settlement built there. The name goes back to the Swiss German Schwand- ("clearing"). The added "bei Brienz" was added in 1911 to ease distinction with the municipality Schwanden in the canton of Glarus, and numerous villages across Switzerland. The first historical appearance of the place was in 1524.

== History ==
During the Middle Ages it was part of the Herrschaft of Ringgenberg. It was first mentioned in 1374 as Swanden when the Lords of Kien sold it to the von Scharnachtal family from Bern. The von Scharnachtal family held it until 1568, then sold it to the city of Bern. The village has always been part of the parish of Brienz.

The local economy traditionally relied mostly on seasonal alpine herding. Beginning in the 19th century, small wood carving shops provided another source of income. Today, agriculture is a sideline business or hobby and many of the residents work in wood carving, carpentry or at a violin bow factory. Other residents commute to jobs in Interlaken or at the Ballenberg Open Air Museum.

The village and fields were often damaged when the Schwander and Lammbach rivers flooded. Beginning in the 1890s flood control projects protected the village from the rivers.

== Geography ==
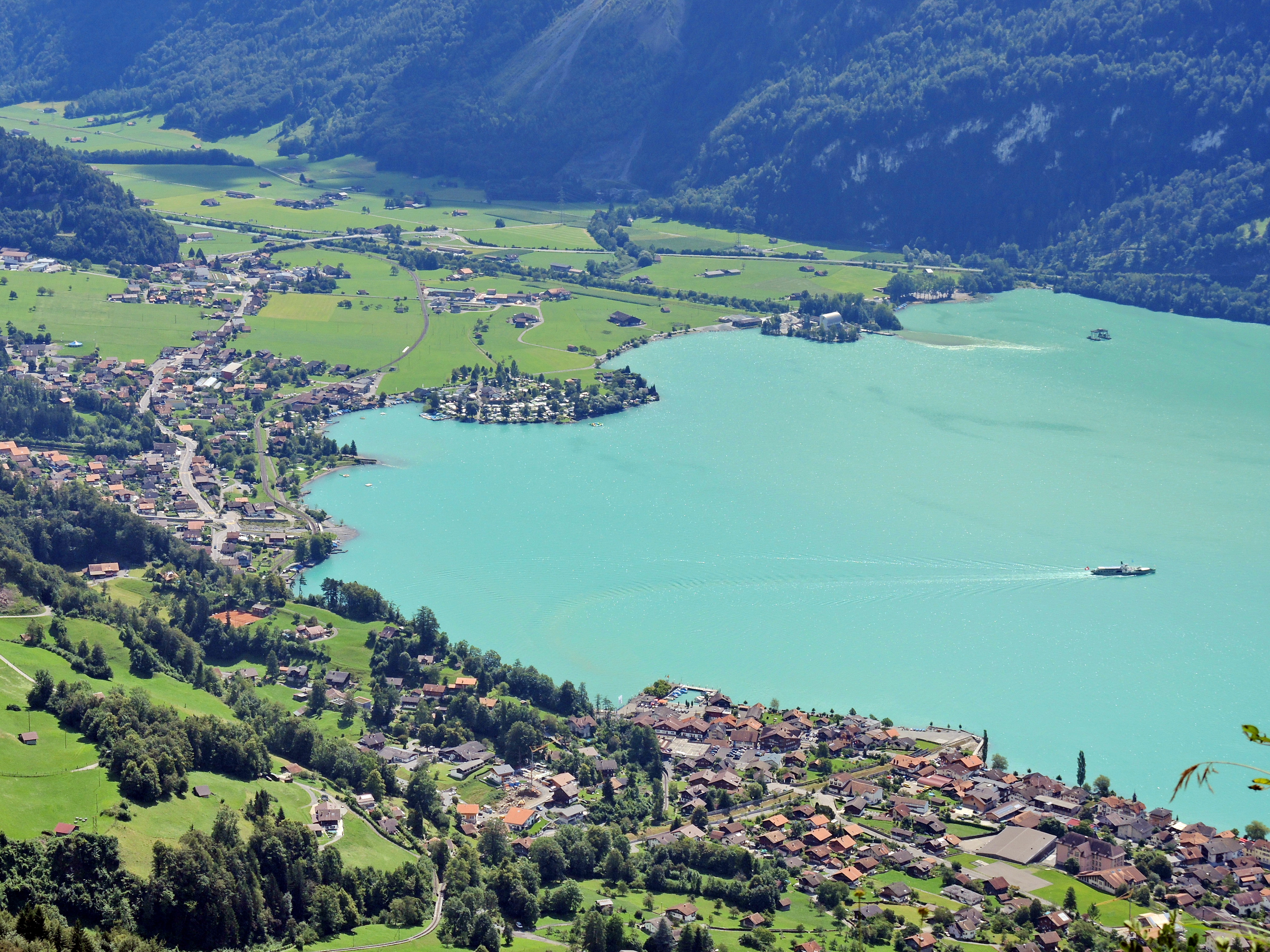
Schwanden village, Brienz, Lake Brienz and the surrounding mountains

Aerial view (1952)

Schwanden bei Brienz lies in the Bernese Oberland south of the Emmental Alps, which form the natural border between the Bernese Oberland and Central Switzerland. The northern border of the municipality is formed by the peaks of the Brienzer Rothorn and Arnihaaggen. The three streams Glyssibach, Schwanderbach, and Lammbach flow off the slopes of these mountains through the town and lead soon thereafter to Lake Brienz. In the past the streams were dangerous, as they were prone to sudden onrushes of water. In order to reduce the danger, walls have been built to contain it in certain areas.

The municipality has an area of 7.06 km^{2} (2.73 sq mi). Of this area, 0.74 km^{2} (0.29 mi^{2}) or 10.5% is used for agricultural purposes, while 3.5 km^{2} (1.4 mi^{2}) or 49.9% is forested. Of the rest of the land, 0.35 km^{2} (0.14 mi^{2}) or 5.0% is settled (buildings or roads), 0.09 km^{2} (22 acres) or 1.3% is either rivers or lakes and 2.37 km^{2} (0.92 mi^{2}) or 33.8% is unproductive land.

Of the built up area, housing and buildings made up 3.0% and transportation infrastructure made up 1.7%. Out of the forested land, 38.2% of the total land area is heavily forested and 3.1% is covered with orchards or small clusters of trees. Of the agricultural land, 6.7% is pastures and 3.8% is used for alpine pastures. All the water in the municipality is flowing water. Of the unproductive areas, 16.5% is unproductive vegetation and 17.2% is too rocky for vegetation.

On 31 December 2009 Amtsbezirk Interlaken, the municipality's former district, was dissolved. On the following day, 1 January 2010, it joined the newly created Verwaltungskreis Interlaken-Oberhasli.

== Demographics ==
Schwanden bei Brienz has a population (as of December 2020) of 625. As of 2010, 4.9% of the population are resident foreign nationals. Over the last 10 years (2000-2010) the population has changed at a rate of 1.8%. Migration accounted for 7%, while births and deaths accounted for -3%.

Most of the population (as of 2000) speaks German (581 or 96.0%) as their first language, Serbo-Croatian is the second most common (6 or 1.0%) and Italian is the third (4 or 0.7%). There are 2 people who speak French.

As of 2008, the population was 50.0% male and 50.0% female. The population was made up of 286 Swiss men (46.7% of the population) and 20 (3.3%) non-Swiss men. There were 296 Swiss women (48.4%) and 10 (1.6%) non-Swiss women. Of the population in the municipality, 197 or about 32.6% were born in Schwanden bei Brienz and lived there in 2000. There were 201 or 33.2% who were born in the same canton, while 117 or 19.3% were born somewhere else in Switzerland, and 65 or 10.7% were born outside of Switzerland.

As of 2010, children and teenagers (0–19 years old) make up 17.8% of the population, while adults (20–64 years old) make up 62.3% and seniors (over 64 years old) make up 19.9%.

As of 2000, there were 249 people who were single and never married in the municipality. There were 290 married individuals, 36 widows or widowers and 30 individuals who are divorced.

As of 2000, there were 99 households that consist of only one person and 19 households with five or more people. In 2000, a total of 263 apartments (70.5% of the total) were permanently occupied, while 89 apartments (23.9%) were seasonally occupied and 21 apartments (5.6%) were empty. The vacancy rate for the municipality, in 2011, was 0.47%.

The historical population is given in the following chart:

== Politics ==
In the 2011 federal election the most popular party was the Swiss People's Party (SVP) which received 24.7% of the vote. The next three most popular parties were the Social Democratic Party (SP) (18.7%), the Conservative Democratic Party (BDP) (13.5%) and the Green Party (12.8%). In the federal election, a total of 252 votes were cast, and the voter turnout was 52.8%.

== Economy ==
As of 2011, Schwanden bei Brienz had an unemployment rate of 1%. As of 2008, there were a total of 51 people employed in the municipality. Of these, there were 17 people employed in the primary economic sector and about 8 businesses involved in this sector. 22 people were employed in the secondary sector and there were 5 businesses in this sector. 12 people were employed in the tertiary sector, with 8 businesses in this sector. There were 314 residents of the municipality who were employed in some capacity, of which females made up 45.9% of the workforce.

In 2008 there were a total of 36 full-time equivalent jobs. The number of jobs in the primary sector was 9, all of which were in agriculture. The number of jobs in the secondary sector was 18 of which 6 or (33.3%) were in manufacturing and 13 (72.2%) were in construction. The number of jobs in the tertiary sector was 9. In the tertiary sector; 1 was in wholesale or retail sales or the repair of motor vehicles, 1 was in the information industry, and 2 were technical professionals or scientists.

In 2000, there were 23 workers who commuted into the municipality and 256 workers who commuted away. The municipality is a net exporter of workers, with about 11.1 workers leaving the municipality for every one entering. Of the working population, 12.1% used public transportation to get to work, and 59.6% used a private car.

== Religion ==
From the 2000 census, 70 or 11.6% were Roman Catholic, while 449 or 74.2% belonged to the Swiss Reformed Church. Of the rest of the population, there were 3 members of an Orthodox church (or about 0.50% of the population), and there were 34 individuals (or about 5.62% of the population) who belonged to another Christian church. There were 15 (or about 2.48% of the population) who were Islamic. There was 1 person who was Hindu and 1 individual who belonged to another church. 27 (or about 4.46% of the population) belonged to no church, are agnostic or atheist, and 22 individuals (or about 3.64% of the population) did not answer the question.

== Education ==
In Schwanden bei Brienz about 278 or (46.0%) of the population have completed non-mandatory upper secondary education, and 56 or (9.3%) have completed additional higher education (either university or a Fachhochschule). Of the 56 who completed tertiary schooling, 67.9% were Swiss men, 21.4% were Swiss women and 8.9% were non-Swiss women.

As of 2000, there were 2 students in Schwanden bei Brienz who came from another municipality, while 23 residents attended schools outside the municipality.
