= John Ming =

Swiss Roman Catholic priest, philosopher, and writer

Rev. John Joseph Ming S.J. (20 September 1838 – 17 June 1910) was a Swiss Roman Catholic priest, philosopher and writer. He was born in Giswil, Obwalden and was educated at the Benedictine College, Engelberg, Obwalden. He was ordained in 1868. He was appointed a theological lecturer at the Seminary of the Prince Bishop of Görz in 1871 and was sent to the United States in 1872. He taught philosophy at colleges and contributed articles to the Catholic Encyclopedia and The American Catholic Quarterly Review. He was considered one of the greatest Catholic authorities on sociology of his era.

He died in Brooklyn, Ohio, in 1910.

== Bibliography ==
- The Temporal Sovereignty of the Holy See (1892)
- The Data of Modern Ethics Examined (1894)
- The Characteristics and the Religion of Modern Socialism (1908)
- The Morality of Modern Socialism (1909)
