= Wilerhorn (Emmental Alps) =

Mountain in Switzerland

- Location within Switzerland

Highest point
- Elevation: 2,005 m (6,578 ft)
- Prominence: 147 m (482 ft)
- Coordinates: 46°46′25″N 8°6′33″E

Geography
- Location: Bern/Obwalden, Switzerland
- Parent range: Emmental Alps

The Wilerhorn is a mountain of the Bernese Oberland in Switzerland. It lies to the south-east of the Höch Gumme and to the north-west of the Brünig Pass. It should not be confused with the Wilerhorn that is in the Bernese Alps but the canton of Valais.

Administratively, the summit is shared between the municipalities of Lungern, to the north and east, Hofstetten bei Brienz, to the west, and Brienzwiler, to the south. Hofstetten bei Brienz and Brienzwiler are in the canton of Bern, whilst Lungern is in the canton of Obwalden.
