= Brienzwiler railway station =

Railway station in Switzerland

Brienzwiler
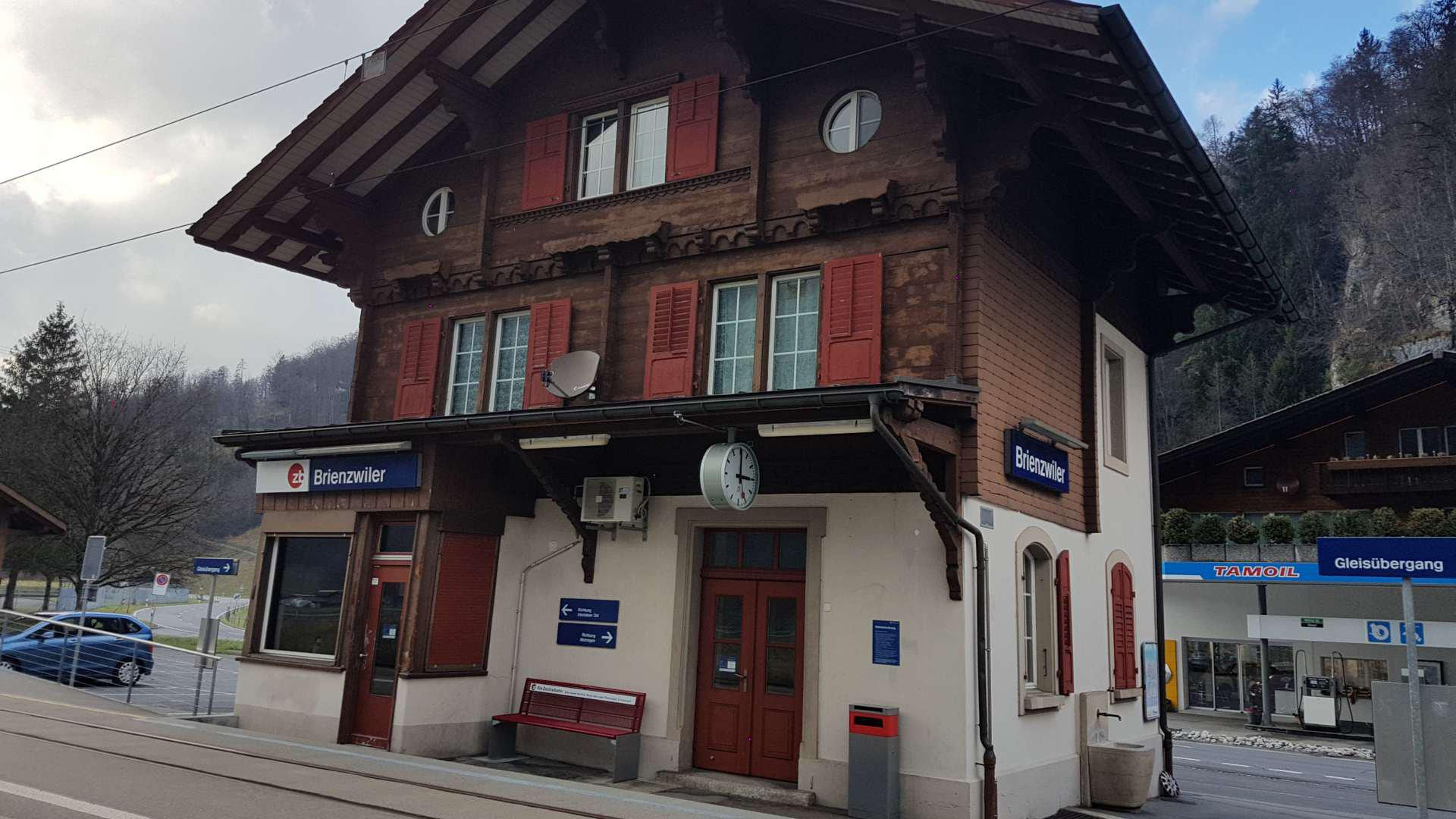
- The station building in 2018

General information
- Location: Brienzwiler; Switzerland
- Coordinates: 46°44′44″N 8°05′26″E
- Elevation: 575 m (1,886 ft)
- Owner: Zentralbahn
- Line: Brünig line
- Train operators: Zentralbahn

Services
Preceding station	Zentralbahn	Following station
Brienz towards Interlaken Ost	Regio	Meiringen Terminus
Location
- Location within Switzerland Location within Canton of Bern

Brienzwiler railway station is a Swiss railway station in the municipality of Brienzwiler and the canton of Bern. Brienzwiler is a stop on the Brünig line, owned by the Zentralbahn, that operates between Interlaken and Lucerne. The station is located at Balmhof, some 1.5 km (0.93 mi) to the south-west of the centre of the village of Brienzwiler.

== Services ==
The following services stop at Brienzwiler:

- Regio: hourly service between Interlaken Ost and Meiringen.
