= Interlaken-Oberhasli (administrative district) =

Coordinates: 46°04′N 7°03′E

Interlaken-Oberhasli District Verwaltungskreis Interlaken-Oberhasli
- District
- Country: Switzerland
- Canton: Bern
- Capital: Interlaken

Area
  - Total: 1,228.93 km^{2} (474.49 sq mi)

Population (2020)
  - Total: 47,645
  - Density: 38.769/km^{2} (100.41/sq mi)
- Time zone: UTC+1 (CET)
  - Summer (DST): UTC+2 (CEST)
- Municipalities: 28

Interlaken-Oberhasli District in the Canton of Bern was created on 1 January 2010, uniting the former Interlaken and Oberhasli districts. It is part of the Oberland administrative region. It contains 28 municipalities with an area of 1,228.93 km^{2} (474.49 sq mi) and a population (as of December 2008) of 48,763.

Flag	Name	Population (31 December 2020)	Area in km^{2}
Beatenberg	Beatenberg	1,199	29.18
Bönigen	Bönigen	2,569	15.14
Brienz	Brienz	3,158	47.94
Brienzwiler	Brienzwiler	481	17.62
Därligen	Därligen	415	6.89
Grindelwald	Grindelwald	3,800	170.60
Gsteigwiler	Gsteigwiler	402	7.01
Gündlischwand	Gündlischwand	351	16.88
Guttannen	Guttannen	245	200.77
Habkern	Habkern	634	51.06
Hasliberg	Hasliberg	1,158	41.68
Hofstetten bei Brienz	Hofstetten bei Brienz	531	8.81
Innertkirchen	Innertkirchen	1,072	236.61
Interlaken	Interlaken	5,719	4.31
Iseltwald	Iseltwald	415	22.12
Lauterbrunnen	Lauterbrunnen	2,301	164.47
Leissigen	Leissigen	1,171	10.40
Lütschental	Lütschental	214	13.21
Matten bei Interlaken	Matten bei Interlaken	4,060	5.92
Meiringen	Meiringen	4,666	40.17
Niederried bei Interlaken	Niederried bei Interlaken	368	4.24
Oberried am Brienzersee	Oberried am Brienzersee	461	20.11
Ringgenberg	Ringgenberg	2,588	8.81
Saxeten	Saxeten	92	19.09
Schattenhalb	Schattenhalb	552	31.41
Schwanden bei Brienz	Schwanden bei Brienz	625	7.031
Unterseen	Unterseen	5,760	14.05
Wilderswil	Wilderswil	2,638	13.61
	Total (29)	47,645	1228.93

== Mergers ==
- On 1 January 2014 the former municipality of Gadmen merged into the municipality of Innertkirchen.
