= Brienzwiler =

- Municipality
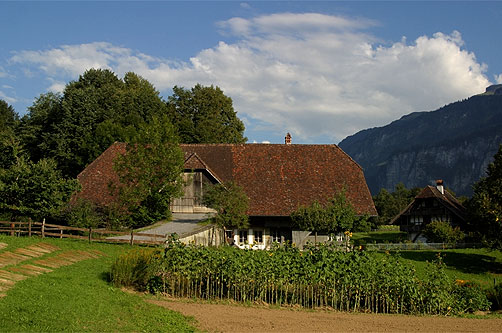
- Bernese farmhouse at the Ballenberg Open Air Museum near Brienzwiler village

- Flag Coat of arms
- Location of Brienzwiler
- Location within Switzerland Location within Canton of Bern
- Coordinates: 46°45′N 8°5′E
- Country: Switzerland
- Canton: Bern
- District: Interlaken-Oberhasli

Government
  - Executive: Gemeinderat with 7 members
  - Mayor: Gemeindepräsident(in); Adrian Schild (as of 2026)

Area
  - Total: 17.6 km^{2} (6.8 sq mi)
- Elevation: 680 m (2,230 ft)

Population (December 2020)
  - Total: 481
  - Density: 27.3/km^{2} (70.8/sq mi)
- Time zone: UTC+01:00 (CET)
  - Summer (DST): UTC+02:00 (CEST)
- Postal code: 3856
- SFOS number: 574
- ISO 3166 code: CH-BE
- Surrounded by: Brienz, Grindelwald, Hofstetten bei Brienz, Lungern (OW), Meiringen
- Website: www.brienzwiler.ch

Brienzwiler is a municipality in the Interlaken-Oberhasli administrative district in the canton of Bern in Switzerland. Besides the village of Brienzwiler, the municipality also includes the settlement of Balmhof.

== History ==
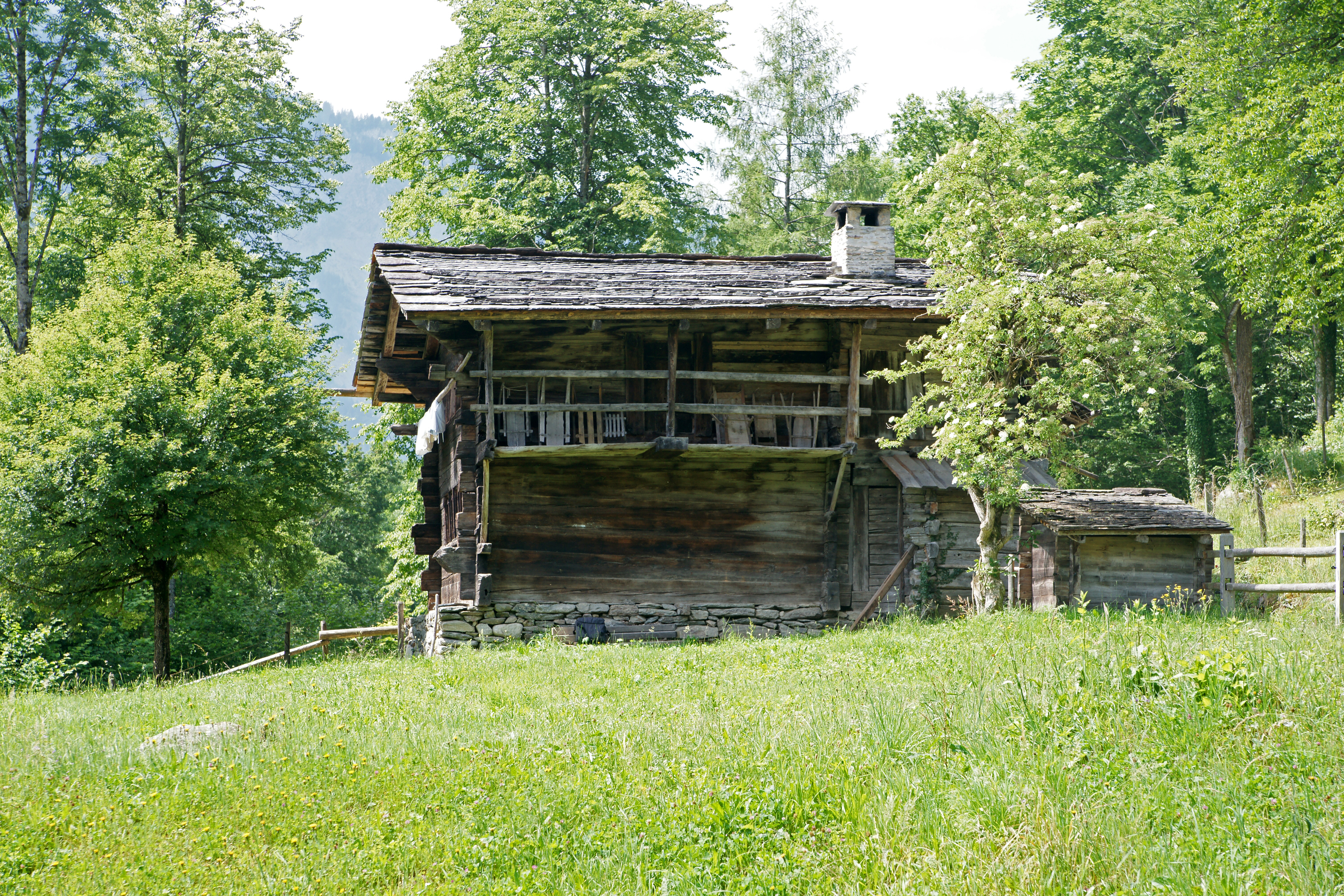
A traditional house from the Canton of Valais at the Ballenberg Museum

Brienzwiler is first mentioned in 1347 as Wiler am Brünig.

During the Middle Ages Brienzwiler was held by the Ministerialis (unfree knights in the service of a feudal overlord) family of Rudenz. They held the city for the Lords of Ringgenberg. The Rudenz family held the village until 1361 when they sold it to a citizen of Bern. Over the following years it passed from owner to owner and was subdivided until the city of Bern acquired the entire village in 1522. When Bern adopted the Protestant Reformation in 1528, they secularized and annexed the lands of the nearby Interlaken Monastery, including some land near Brienzwiler. Bern assigned Brienzwiler to the newly created, secular bailiwick of Interlaken.

Brienzwiler belongs to the large parish of Brienz. However, since the early 20th century they have their own filial church and cemetery.

Traditionally, the village's economy was based on farming in the Aare river valley and seasonal alpine herding in the alpine valleys. They also received some income from travelers over the Brünig Pass. Beginning in the 19th century, there was a small tourist industry in the municipality and in 1888 a rail station of the Brünig railway line allowed more tourists to visit. Today the local economy is based on wood carving, government jobs, hotel and tourism related work and the Ballenberg Open Air Museum.

== Geography ==
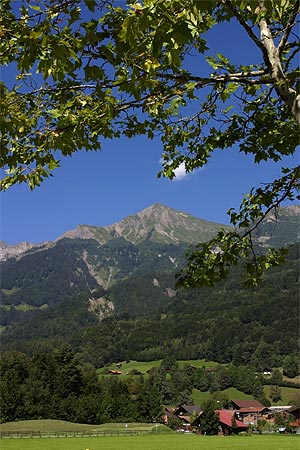
Meadows and mountains near Brienzwiler

Aerial view (1956)

Brienzwiler has an area of 17.64 km^{2} (6.81 sq mi). Of this area, 5.44 km^{2} (2.10 mi^{2}) or 30.8% is used for agricultural purposes, while 5.91 km^{2} (2.28 mi^{2}) or 33.5% is forested. Of the rest of the land, 0.52 km^{2} (0.20 mi^{2}) or 2.9% is settled (buildings or roads), 0.15 km^{2} (37 acres) or 0.8% is either rivers or lakes and 5.62 km^{2} (2.17 mi^{2}) or 31.8% is unproductive land.

Of the built up area, housing and buildings made up 1.4% and transportation infrastructure made up 0.9%. Out of the forested land, 30.4% of the total land area is heavily forested and 1.7% is covered with orchards or small clusters of trees. Of the agricultural land, 3.3% is pastures and 27.5% is used for alpine pastures. All the water in the municipality is flowing water. Of the unproductive areas, 9.6% is unproductive vegetation and 21.6% is too rocky for vegetation.

Brienzwiler is located on both sides of the Aare River. North of the Aare it includes the villages of Brienzwiler and Balmhof (train station) as well as several small settlements, including Wiler-Vorsass and Ramseren and the peak of the Wilerhorn 2,005 m (6,578 ft). South of the Aare it includes the exclave Alp Oltscheren.

On 31 December 2009 Amtsbezirk Interlaken, the municipality's former district, was dissolved. On the following day, 1 January 2010, it joined the newly created Verwaltungskreis Interlaken-Oberhasli.

== Coat of arms ==
The blazon of the municipal coat of arms is Azure on a Bend Argent a Tower embattled Gules.

== Demographics ==
Brienzwiler has a population (as of December 2020) of 481. As of 2010, 7.8% of the population are resident foreign nationals. Over the last 10 years (2000-2010) the population has changed at a rate of -10.5%. Migration accounted for -7.1%, while births and deaths accounted for -2.6%.

Most of the population (as of 2000) speaks German (543 or 93.6%) as their first language, Albanian is the second most common (23 or 4.0%) and English is the third (6 or 1.0%). There are 5 people who speak French, 1 person who speaks Italian.

As of 2008, the population was 49.7% male and 50.3% female. The population was made up of 236 Swiss men (46.2% of the population) and 18 (3.5%) non-Swiss men. There were 235 Swiss women (46.0%) and 22 (4.3%) non-Swiss women. Of the population in the municipality, 232 or about 40.0% were born in Brienzwiler and lived there in 2000. There were 181 or 31.2% who were born in the same canton, while 102 or 17.6% were born somewhere else in Switzerland, and 62 or 10.7% were born outside of Switzerland.

As of 2010, children and teenagers (0–19 years old) make up 20.9% of the population, while adults (20–64 years old) make up 60.3% and seniors (over 64 years old) make up 18.8%.

As of 2000, there were 248 people who were single and never married in the municipality. There were 272 married individuals, 32 widows or widowers and 28 individuals who are divorced.

As of 2000, there were 77 households that consist of only one person and 26 households with five or more people. In 2000, a total of 225 apartments (66.8% of the total) were permanently occupied, while 69 apartments (20.5%) were seasonally occupied and 43 apartments (12.8%) were empty. As of 2010, the construction rate of new housing units was 2 new units per 1000 residents. The vacancy rate for the municipality, in 2011, was 1.71%.

The historical population is given in the following chart:

== Heritage sites of national significance ==
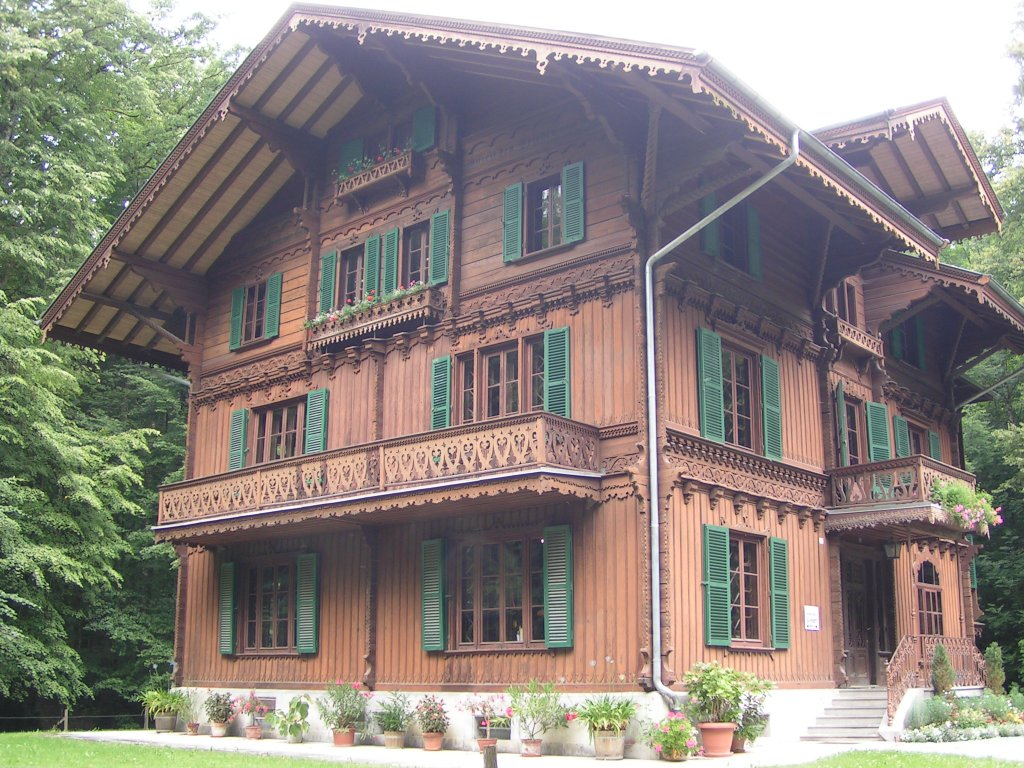
A house in the Ballenberg Open Air Museum

The Swiss Open Air Museum, Ballenberg (Schweizerisches Freilichtmuseum Ballenberg), which is shared with Hofstetten, is listed as Swiss heritage site of national significance. The entire village of Brienzwiler is part of the Inventory of Swiss Heritage Sites.

== Politics ==
In the 2011 federal election the most popular party was the Swiss People's Party (SVP) which received 48.3% of the vote. The next three most popular parties were the Conservative Democratic Party (BDP) (13.9%), the Green Party (13.4%) and the Social Democratic Party (SP) (9.9%). In the federal election, a total of 180 votes were cast, and the voter turnout was 45.8%.

== Economy ==
As of 2011, Brienzwiler had an unemployment rate of 1.28%. As of 2008, there were a total of 97 people employed in the municipality. Of these, there were 18 people employed in the primary economic sector and about 5 businesses involved in this sector. 22 people were employed in the secondary sector and there were 7 businesses in this sector. 57 people were employed in the tertiary sector, with 15 businesses in this sector. There were 291 residents of the municipality who were employed in some capacity, of which females made up 43.6% of the workforce.

In 2008 there were a total of 70 full-time equivalent jobs. The number of jobs in the primary sector was 8, all of which were in agriculture. The number of jobs in the secondary sector was 19 of which 13 or (68.4%) were in manufacturing and 7 (36.8%) were in construction. The number of jobs in the tertiary sector was 43. In the tertiary sector; 9 or 20.9% were in wholesale or retail sales or the repair of motor vehicles, 1 was in the movement and storage of goods, 6 or 14.0% were in a hotel or restaurant, 3 or 7.0% were technical professionals or scientists and 13 or 30.2% were in health care.

In 2000, there were 58 workers who commuted into the municipality and 181 workers who commuted away. The municipality is a net exporter of workers, with about 3.1 workers leaving the municipality for every one entering. Of the working population, 11.7% used public transportation to get to work, and 58.4% used a private car.

== Religion ==
From the 2000 census, 41 or 7.1% were Roman Catholic, while 442 or 76.2% belonged to the Swiss Reformed Church. Of the rest of the population, there were 41 individuals (or about 7.07% of the population) who belonged to another Christian church. There were 40 (or about 6.90% of the population) who were Islamic. There were 1 individual who belonged to another church. 28 (or about 4.83% of the population) belonged to no church, are agnostic or atheist, and 7 individuals (or about 1.21% of the population) did not answer the question.

== Education ==
In Brienzwiler about 230 or (39.7%) of the population have completed non-mandatory upper secondary education, and 40 or (6.9%) have completed additional higher education (either university or a Fachhochschule). Of the 40 who completed tertiary schooling, 75.0% were Swiss men, 15.0% were Swiss women.

During the 2010-11 school year, there were no students attending school in Brienzwiler. As of 2000, there were 69 students from Brienzwiler who attended schools outside the municipality.

== Transport ==
Brienzwiler railway station on the Brünig line is served by an hourly Regio train between Interlaken and Meiringen. However the station is located some 1.5 km (0.93 mi) to the south-west of the village centre. Brienzwiler village is also served by a twice-hourly post bus service from Brienz.
