= Arnihaaggen =

Mountain in Switzerland

- Location within Switzerland

Highest point
- Elevation: 2,216 m (7,270 ft)
- Prominence: 191 m (627 ft)
- Parent peak: Brienzer Rothorn
- Coordinates: 46°47′26″N 8°04′21″E

Geography
- Location: Obwalden, Switzerland (near the canton of Bern)
- Parent range: Emmental Alps

The Arnihaaggen (2,216 m) is a mountain of the Emmental Alps in Switzerland. It lies to the east of the Brienzer Rothorn and to the west of the Höch Gumme. The small mountain lake of Eisee lies immediately to the north.

Administratively, the summit is located within the municipality of Giswil. The south summit (2,207 m) is shared between the municipalities of Giswil, to the north, Hofstetten bei Brienz, to the south-east, and Schwanden bei Brienz, to the south-west. Hofstetten bei Brienz and Schwanden bei Brienz are in the canton of Bern, whilst Giswil is in the canton of Obwalden.
