= Wilerhorn (Bernese Alps) =

Mountain in Switzerland

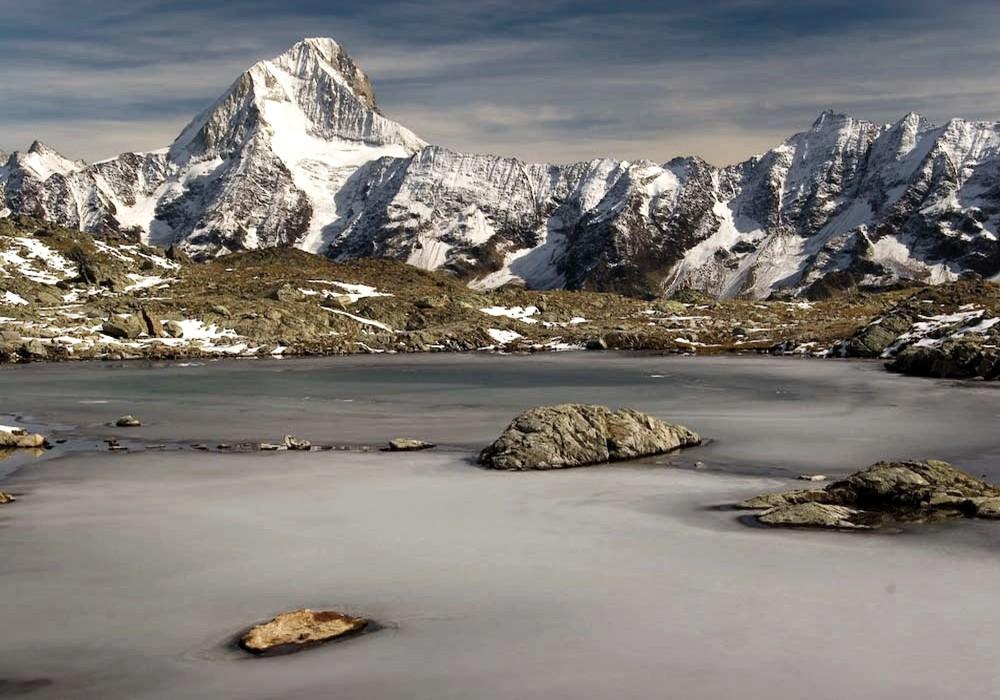
- The Bietschhorn (left) and the Wilerhorn (right) from the Lötschen Pass (north side)

Highest point
- Elevation: 3,307 m (10,850 ft)
- Prominence: 238 m (781 ft)
- Parent peak: Finsteraarhorn
- Coordinates: 46°22′43.3″N 7°48′38.4″E

Geography
- Location within Switzerland
- Location: Valais, Switzerland
- Parent range: Bernese Alps

The Wilerhorn is a mountain of the Bernese Alps, overlooking Wiler and in the canton of Valais. It lies west of the Bietschhorn, on the range separating the Lötschental from the main Rhone valley. It should not be confused with the Wilerhorn that is in the canton of Bern but the Emmental Alps.
