= Lungern =

- Municipality
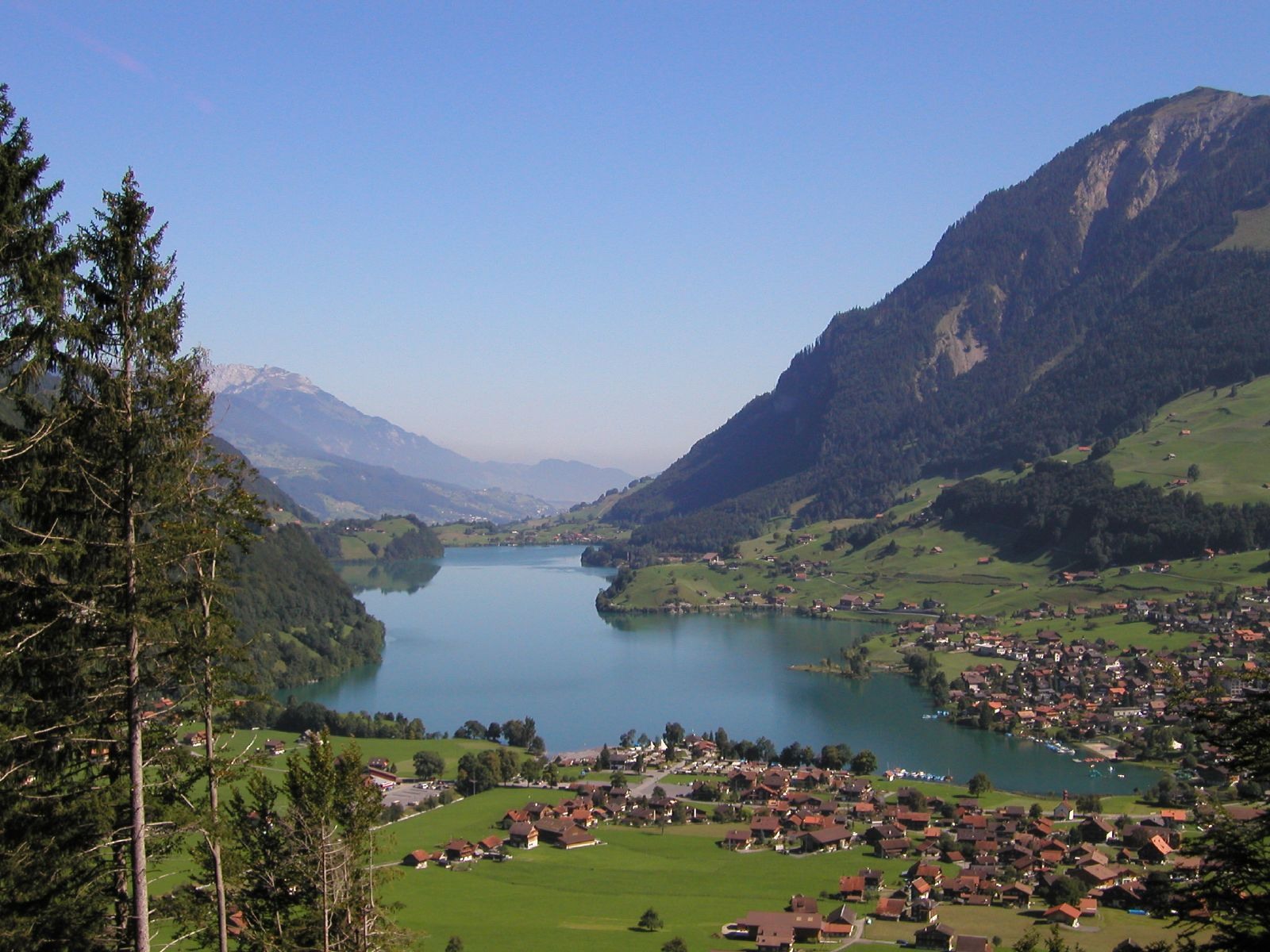

- Coat of arms
- Location of Lungern
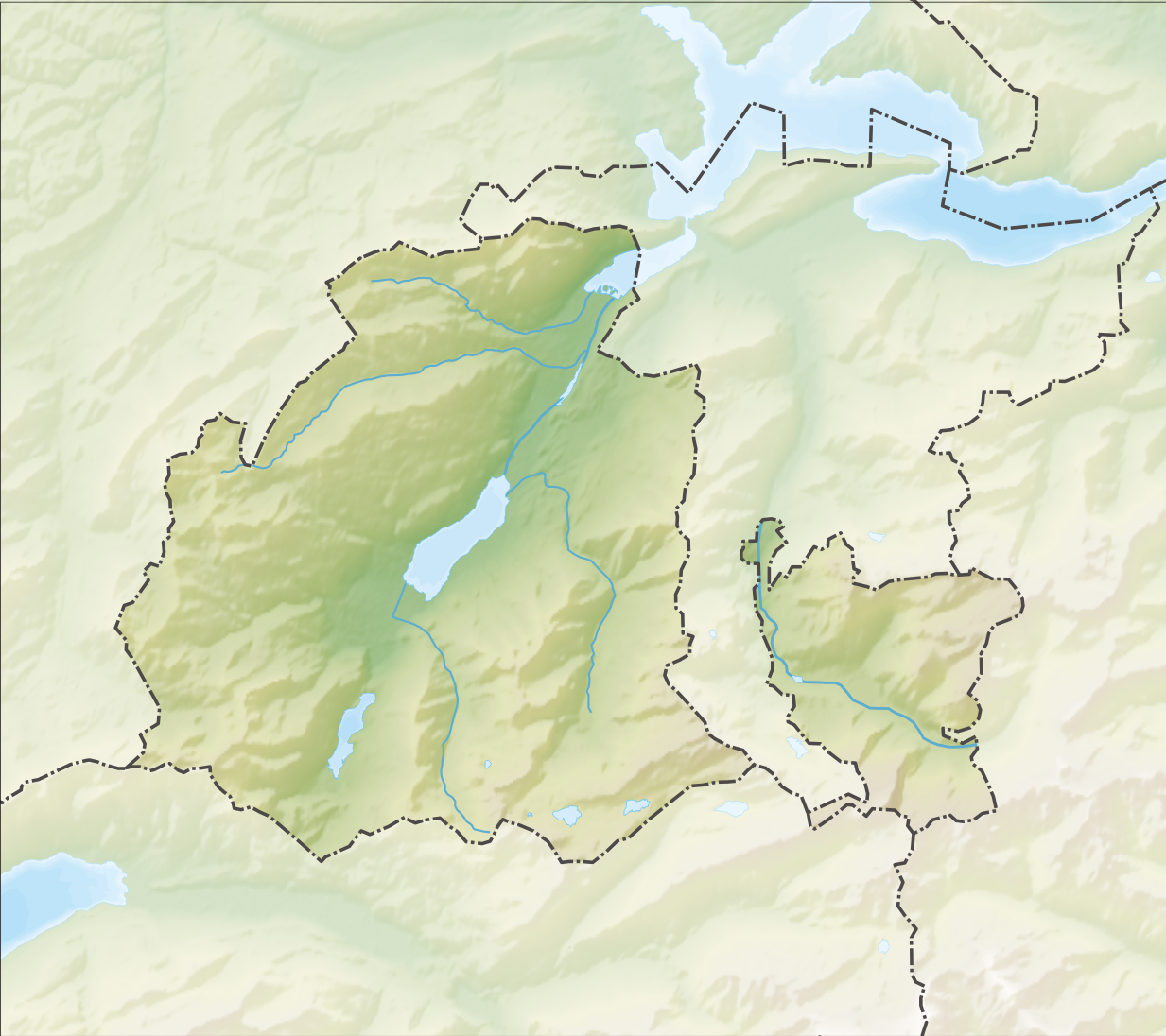
- Location within Switzerland Location within Canton of Obwalden
- Coordinates: 46°47′N 8°09′E
- Country: Switzerland
- Canton: Obwalden
- District: n.a.

Area
  - Total: 44.99 km^{2} (17.37 sq mi)
- Elevation: 715 m (2,346 ft)

Population (December 2020)
  - Total: 2,138
  - Density: 47.52/km^{2} (123.1/sq mi)
- Time zone: UTC+01:00 (CET)
  - Summer (DST): UTC+02:00 (CEST)
- Postal code: 6078
- SFOS number: 1405
- ISO 3166 code: CH-OW
- Surrounded by: Brienzwiler (BE), Giswil, Hasliberg (BE), Hofstetten bei Brienz (BE), Kerns, Meiringen (BE), Sachseln
- Website: www.lungern.ch

Lungern (Swiss Standard German pronunciation: [ˈlʊŋərn]) is a municipality in the canton of Obwalden in Switzerland. It encompasses Lake Lungern and, besides the village of Lungern, the settlements of Bürglen, Kaiserstuhl and Obsee.

== Geography ==
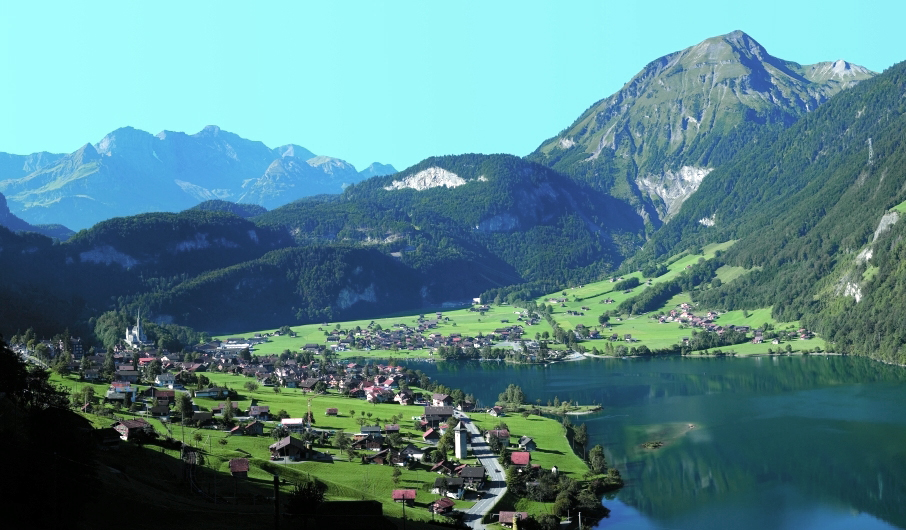
Village of Lungern

Aerial view from 1800 m by Walter Mittelholzer (1926)

The village of Lungern lies 750 metres (2,460 ft) above sea level in the highest part of the canton of Obwalden, on the eastern shore of the Lake of Lungern and at the foot of the Brünig Pass. It is the highest village of the Sarneraa-Valley, in a basin open only to the north and surrounded on all other sides by steep and woody inclinations and rocks.

To the south-west the municipality extends to the Brünig Pass. On its north-western side, the municipal boundary is set by the Wilerhorn and Höch Gumme mountains, and includes the whole of the Lake of Lungern. To the east, the boundary reaches as far as the Hochstollen and Chingstuel mountains, and includes the Güpfi mountain and part of the Kleine Melchtal valley.

Besides the village of Lungern, the municipality includes the settlements of Kaiserstuhl and Bürglen that lie at the northern end of the lake, and Obsee on the south-western end of the lake.

The municipal district of Lungern has an area of 46.33 square kilometres (11,450 acres), of which 6.48 square kilometres (1,600 acres) are meadow and tilled land, 19.2 square kilometres (4,700 acres) are pastureland, 15.97 square kilometres (3,950 acres) are wooded and the remaining 2.91 square kilometres (720 acres) are unproductive.

== History ==
The first legal proof of Lungern's existence is contained in a tax register for the diocese of the bishop of Konstanz in Germany dating from the year 1275. It is mentioned as Lutigern and also as de Lungern.

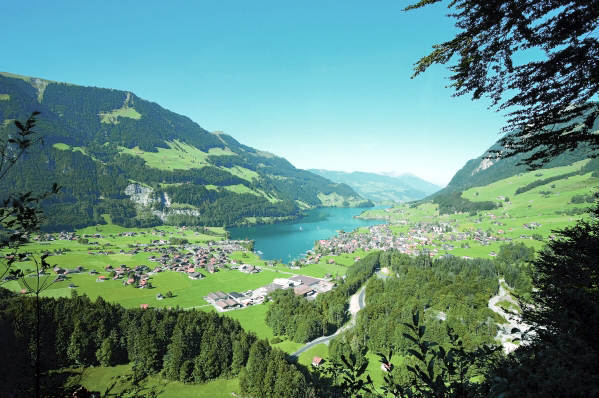
View of Lungern, showing the section of Obsee

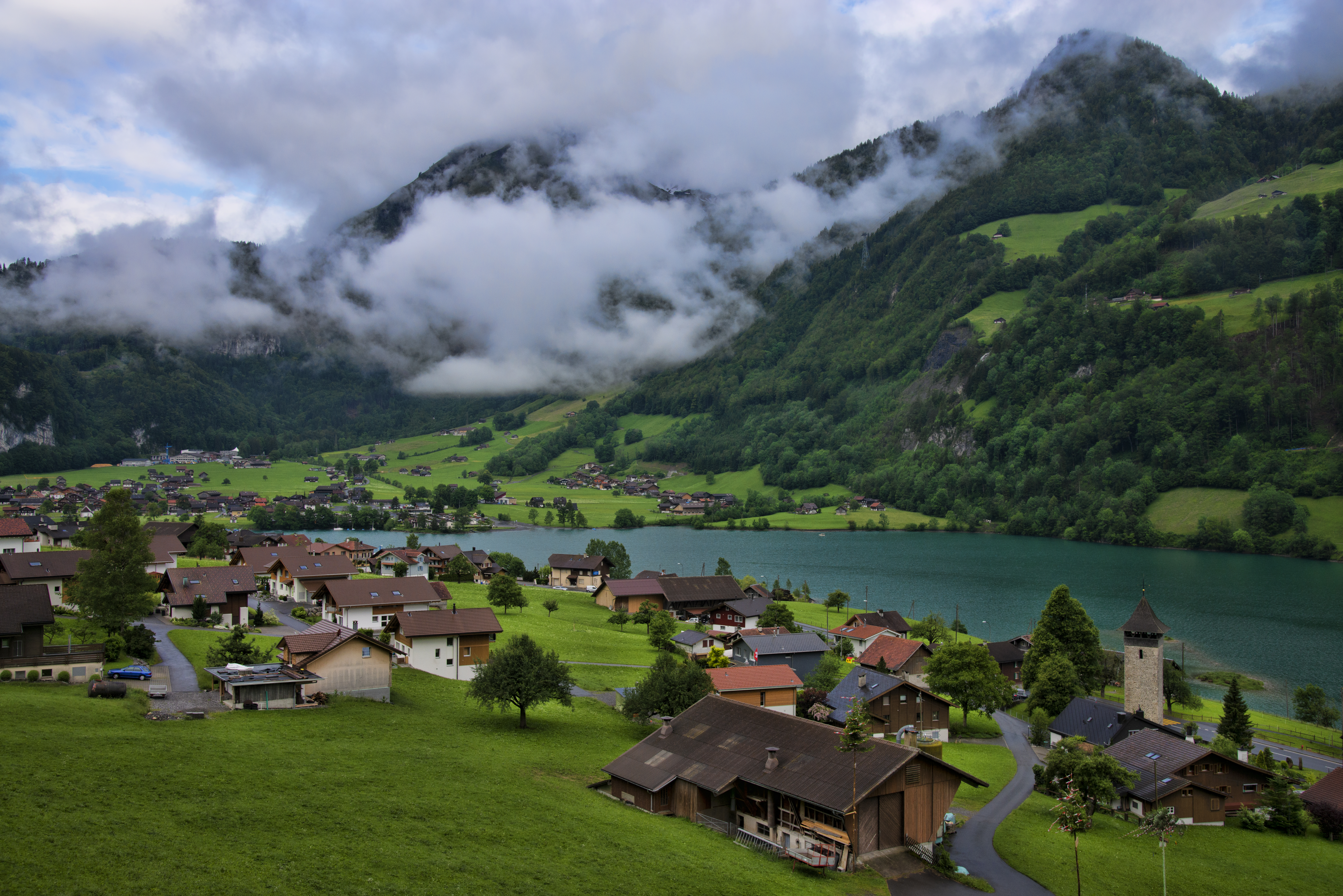
Lungern, traditional and modern houses along the lake

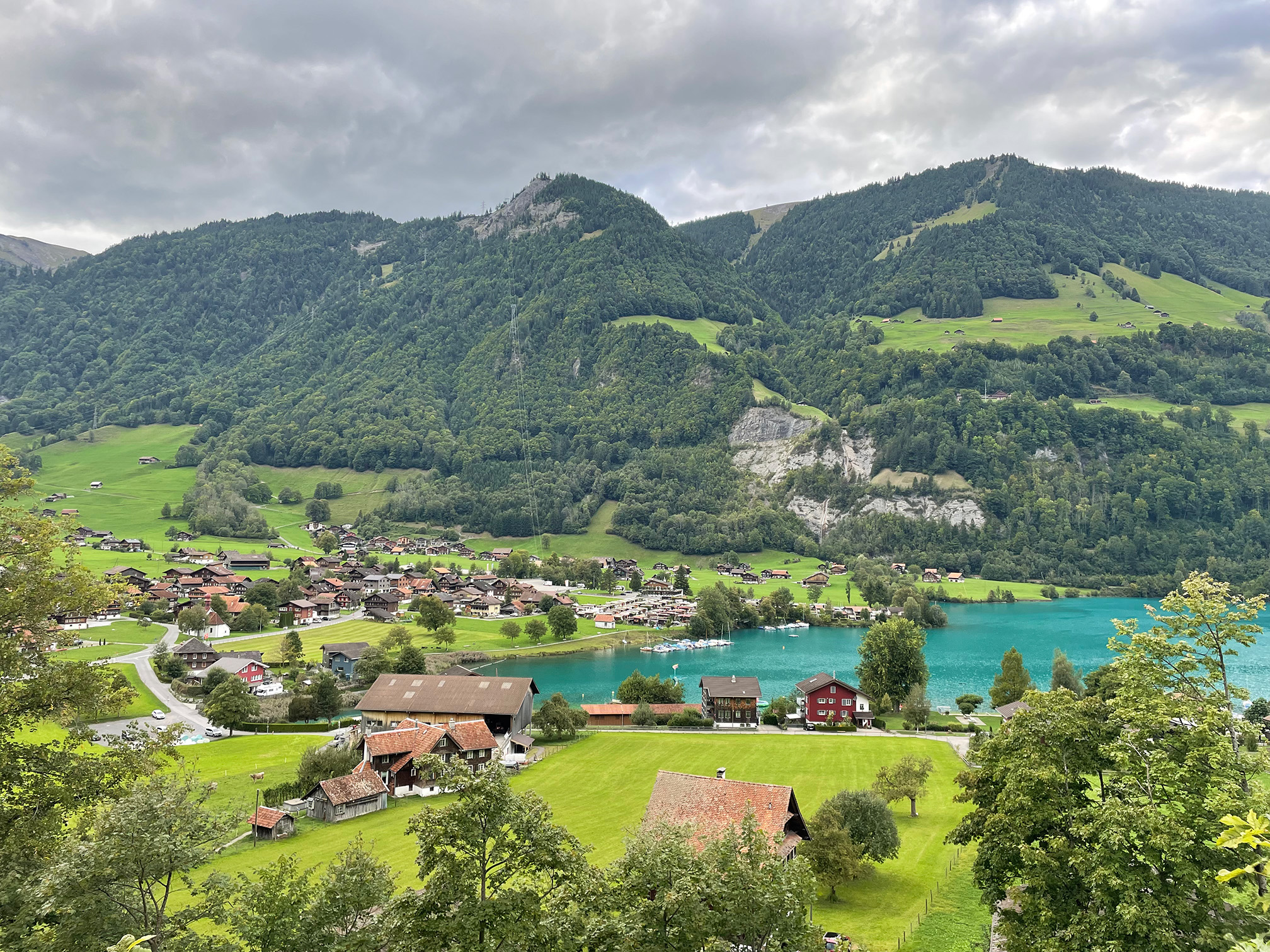
View of Lungern from the church

In 1861 it became easier to reach the village with the construction of the old road over the Brünig pass. A quarter century later, in 1886, the first mail carriages came over the pass. However, this only lasted two years, in 1888 the railroad from Brienz to Alpnachstad (now part of Alpnach) opened. In 1887 the Eibach river flooded causing damage to the old village church. Six years later, in 1893, was the consecration of the neo-gothic style church. At the end of the 18th century the population of Lungern lowered the level of the lake, with great effort and over many years, in order to improve living conditions. The works created new land for agriculture, housing, and a sawmill. Within 80 years the hard-won land was lost to a new dam: in 1922 a company named CKW built and started running a power station located at the lake. Nowadays the local power station (EWO) produces electricity from the power of the water of the Lungerersee. In 1942 the railroad line over the Brünig pass was electrified.

== Population and economy ==
Nowadays the village of Lungern has about 2120 inhabitants. The population is stable, so there is a rise in the ratio of elderly to total population. In fact 17.5% of the total population of Lungern are of a pensionable age, compared with an average of 12% in the canton. If work opportunities remain limited this will likely grow even further in the future.

=== Demographics ===
Lungern has a population (as of 31 December 2020) of 2,138. As of 2007, 8.6% of the population was made up of foreign nationals. Over the last 10 years the population has grown at a rate of 2.6%. Most of the population (as of 2000) speaks German (94.8%), with Albanian being second most common (2.2%) and French third (0.7%). As of 2000 the gender distribution of the population was 49.7% male and 50.3% female. In 2000 there were 681 households in Lungern.

In the 2007 federal election the most popular party was just classed as other, which received 41.7% of the vote. The next three most popular parties were the SVP (26.2%), the CVP (25.6%) and the SPS (6.5%).

In Lungern about 71.5% of the population (between ages 25 and 64) have completed either non-mandatory upper secondary education or additional higher education (either university or a Fachhochschule).

=== Economy ===
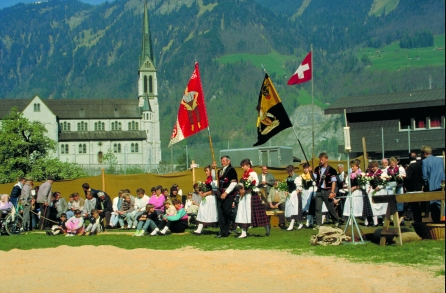
Folk celebration, with traditional costumes.

Lungern has an unemployment rate of 0.6%. In 2005, there were 156 people employed in the primary economic sector and about 66 businesses involved; 443 people were employed in the secondary sector and there were 27 businesses involved; 394 people were employed in the tertiary sector, with 54 businesses. About 24% of the workers were involved in agriculture and forestry, 40% were considered artisans or craftsman. Of the rest of the working population, 13% were in commercial business or teaching staff, 12% were self-employed and 11% were domestic and hotel employees.

Economically, agriculture, forestry and wood-working are predominant. Agriculture comprises cattle-breeding and dairy-farming. All of the agricultural farms are cultivated by native highlanders, and they are mainly situated not in the bottom of the valley but on its slopes.

Lungern has a large industrial sector with the main employers being Gasser Felstechnik with 300 employees specialising in securing rockfaces preventing rockfalls and landslides, neue Holzbau AG (Note: neue Holzbau AG website) (70+ employees) specialising in pre-fabricated wooden constructions and engineered wood products, H-P Gasser Membranbau (Note: H-P Gasser Membranbau website) (80+ employees) specialising in membrane structures and skylights and Sutter Fahrzeugbau (Note: Sutter Fahrzeugbau website) who are specialists in coachwork and commercial vehicles. Located in the Obsee sector of Lungern together with many smaller companies, ensures that companies in Lungern provide employment not just for the inhabitants of the village but the Sarner-Aa valley and the Haslital.

=== Historic population ===
The historical population is given in the following table:

year	population
1790	1,234
1850	1,413
1900	1,828
1950	1,878
1990	1,859
2000	1,965
2005	1,950
2006	1,975
2007	2,023
2008	2,035

== Weather ==
From 1961 to 1990, Lungern had an average of 149.5 days of rain per year and on average received 1,491 mm (58.7 in) of precipitation. The wettest month was August, during which Lungern received an average of 163 mm (6.4 in) of precipitation and over an average of 14.4 days. The month with the most days of precipitation was June, with an average of 14.7, but with only 158 mm (6.2 in) of precipitation. The driest month was October, with an average of 88 mm (3.5 in) of precipitation over 14.4 days.

== Churches ==
There is one Catholic church and five chapels. The church is fairly new, about 110 years old, because the old one was destroyed in a flood of the lake. Chapels are located in the center of the village (Dorfkapelle), Obseekapelle, Kapelle Bürglen, Kapelle Breitenfeld and Kappele Krummelbach.

== Tourist sights ==
The main sights of Lungern are:

- the old church tower (Alter Kirchturm), a neo-Gothic church, and the hamlet Obsee
- the Lungern-Turren cablecar to Turren and then hike to Schönbüel (Note: Lungern-Turren Bahn website)
- the underground shooting range (Note: Brünig Indoor website)

== Transport ==
The Brünig railway line passes through the municipality, on its route between Interlaken and Lucerne. Both Lungern station and Kaiserstuhl OW station are on the line and in the municipality; and in 2013 were served by one train per hour in each direction.
