= Hofstetten bei Brienz =

- Municipality
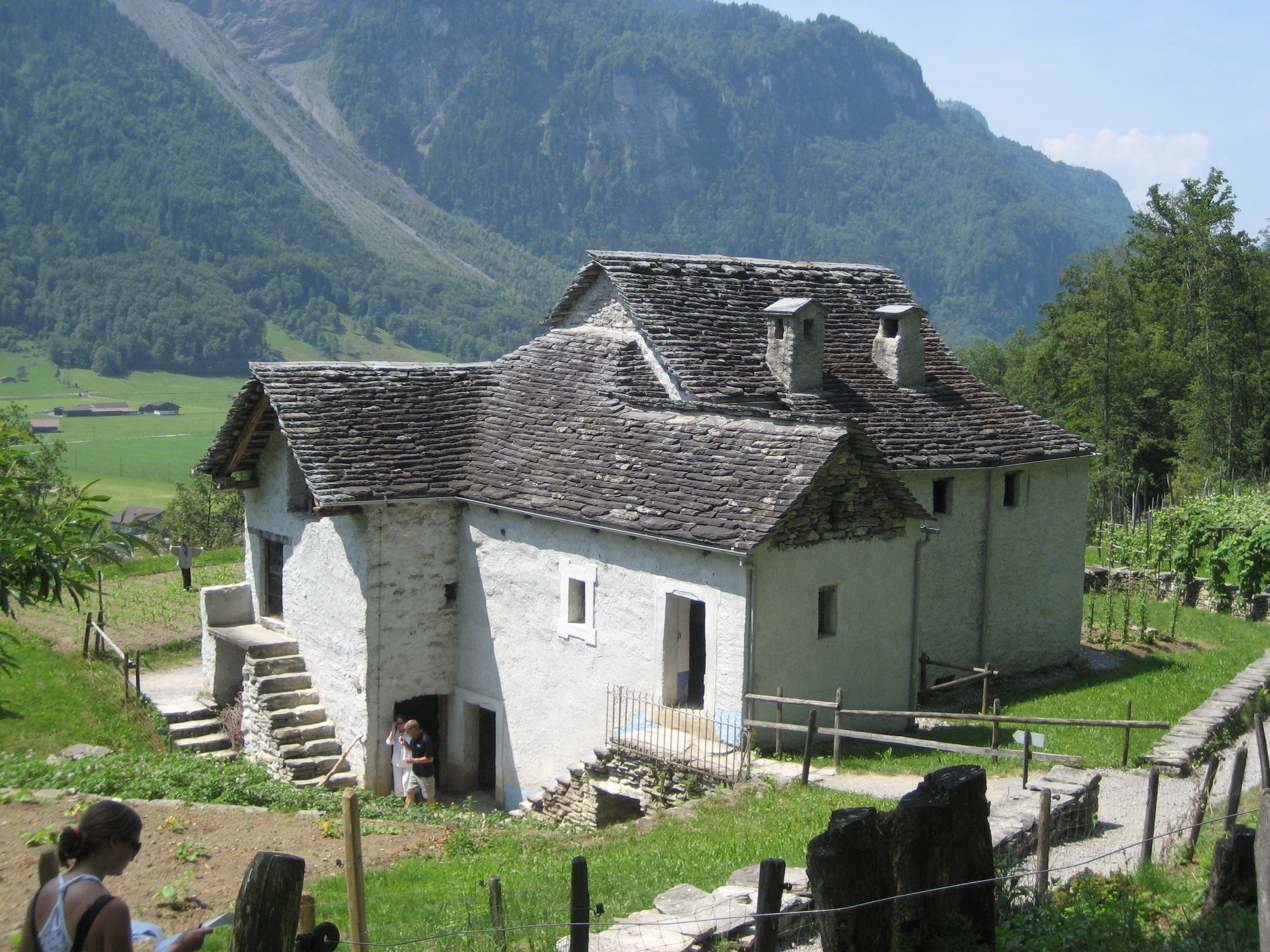
- A Ticino style farm house at the Ballenberg Museum, which is partly in Hofstetten bei Brienz

- Flag Coat of arms
- Location of Hofstetten bei Brienz
- Location within Switzerland Location within Canton of Bern
- Coordinates: 46°45′N 8°04′E
- Country: Switzerland
- Canton: Bern
- District: Interlaken-Oberhasli

Government
  - Executive: Gemeinderat with 5 members
  - Mayor: Gemeindepräsident(in); Beni Haslebacher (as of 2026)

Area
  - Total: 8.7 km^{2} (3.4 sq mi)
- Elevation: 646 m (2,119 ft)

Population (December 2020)
  - Total: 531
  - Density: 61/km^{2} (160/sq mi)
- Time zone: UTC+01:00 (CET)
  - Summer (DST): UTC+02:00 (CEST)
- Postal code: 3858
- SFOS number: 580
- ISO 3166 code: CH-BE
- Surrounded by: Giswil, Lungern, Brienzwiler, Brienz and Schwanden bei Brienz
- Website: www.hofstetten-ballenberg.ch

Hofstetten bei Brienz is a municipality in the Interlaken-Oberhasli administrative district in the canton of Bern in Switzerland.

== Origin of the name ==
Hofstetten (Swiss German "Hostet") comes from the Old High German hovastat, meaning "place where a building will be started."

== History ==
Hofstetten bei Brienz is first mentioned as Hofstetten when it was donated to Interlaken Monastery in 1359. It remained under the monastery's authority until Bern adopted the Protestant Reformation and secularized the monastery and all its land in 1528.

The local economy relied on small scale agriculture and seasonal alpine herding into the 19th century, when wood carving began to provide other jobs. Today woodworking and some tourism provide many jobs in the municipality, though about two-thirds of the working population commute to jobs in Brienz or Meiringen. The largest employer in Hofstetten is the Ballenberg Open Air Museum, which opened in 1978.

== Geography ==
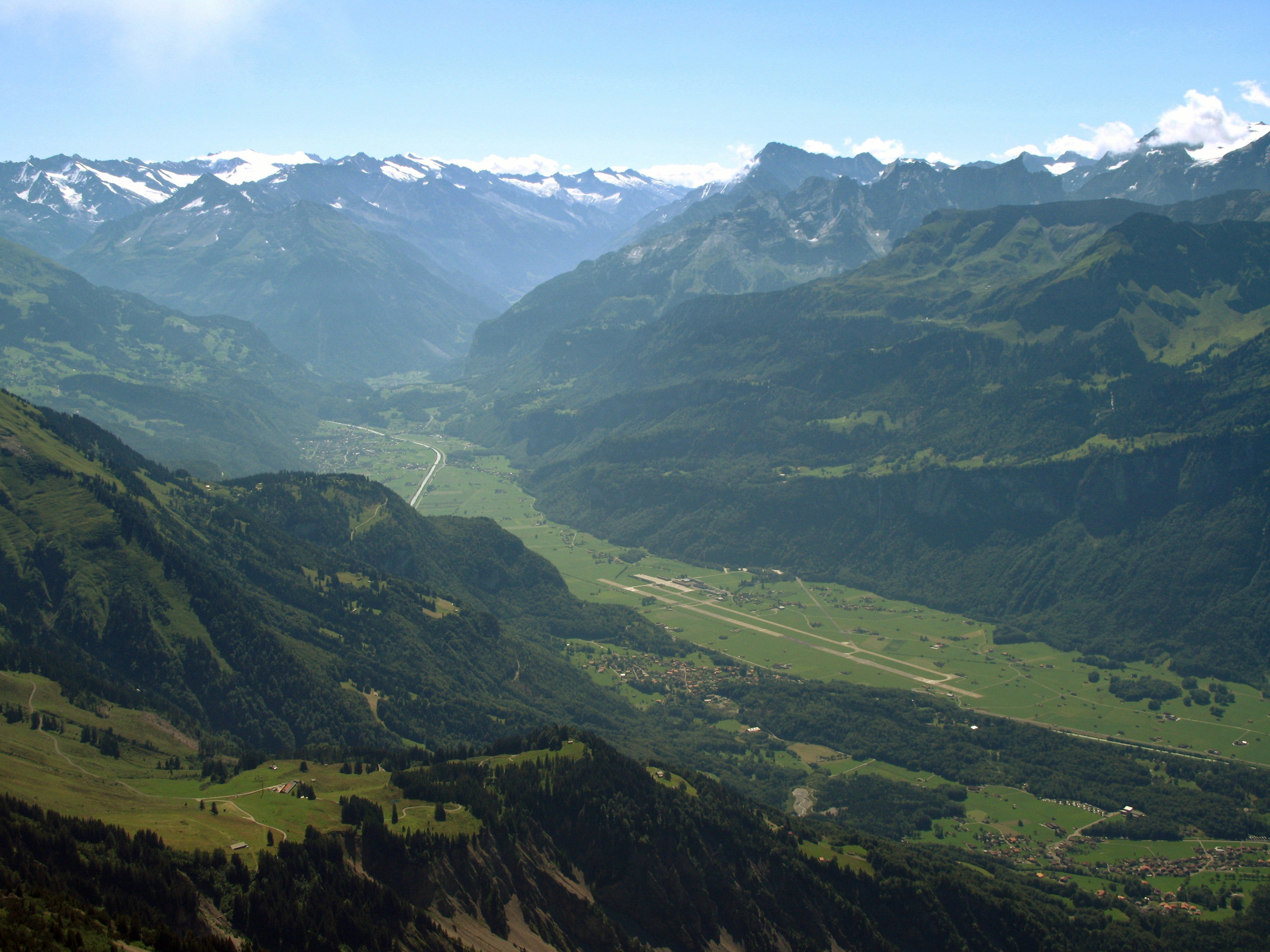
View toward Meiringen with Hofstetten visible in the foreground.

Hofstetten bei Brienz lies in the Bernese Oberland in the Alps. The southern edge of the municipality is formed by the Aare River. Also in the south, but somewhat higher is the small Lake Wyssen.

Although the town in the southern part of the municipality lies at an altitude of 580 m (1,900 ft), the municipality inclines smoothly into its northern area, to the peaks Arnihaaggen (2,207 m (7,241 ft)), Höch Gumme (2,205 m (7,234 ft)) and Wilerhorn (2,005 m (6,578 ft)). The area beneath these peaks is known as Gummenalp. It includes the settlements of Dorf, Schried, Beim Tor and Talgut.

Hofstetten bei Brienz has an area of 8.77 km^{2} (3.39 sq mi). Of this area, 2.58 km^{2} (1.00 mi^{2}) or 29.5% is used for agricultural purposes, while 3.8 km^{2} (1.5 mi^{2}) or 43.4% is forested. Of the rest of the land, 0.39 km^{2} (0.15 mi^{2}) or 4.5% is settled (buildings or roads), 0.14 km^{2} (35 acres) or 1.6% is either rivers or lakes and 1.79 km^{2} (0.69 mi^{2}) or 20.4% is unproductive land.

Of the built up area, housing and buildings made up 2.6% and transportation infrastructure made up 1.1%. Out of the forested land, 38.9% of the total land area is heavily forested and 1.7% is covered with orchards or small clusters of trees. Of the agricultural land, 1.1% is used for growing crops and 9.7% is pastures and 18.3% is used for alpine pastures. Of the water in the municipality, 0.2% is in lakes and 1.4% is in rivers and streams. Of the unproductive areas, 11.9% is unproductive vegetation and 8.6% is too rocky for vegetation.

On 31 December 2009 Amtsbezirk Interlaken, the municipality's former district, was dissolved. On the following day, 1 January 2010, it joined the newly created Verwaltungskreis Interlaken-Oberhasli.

== Coat of arms ==
The blazon of the municipal coat of arms is Vert a Bend wavy Argent between a Mullet and a Mill Wheel Or.

== Demographics ==
Hofstetten bei Brienz has a population (as of December 2020) of 531. As of 2010, 6.7% of the population are resident foreign nationals. Over the last 10 years (2000-2010) the population has changed at a rate of -0.5%. Migration accounted for 1.7%, while births and deaths accounted for -1.7%.

Most of the population (as of 2000) speaks German (528 or 95.8%) as their first language, Italian is the second most common (7 or 1.3%) and Portuguese is the third (6 or 1.1%). There are 5 people who speak French.

As of 2008, the population was 52.7% male and 47.3% female. The population was made up of 276 Swiss men (48.5% of the population) and 24 (4.2%) non-Swiss men. There were 255 Swiss women (44.8%) and 14 (2.5%) non-Swiss women. Of the population in the municipality, 218 or about 39.6% were born in Hofstetten bei Brienz and lived there in 2000. There were 204 or 37.0% who were born in the same canton, while 60 or 10.9% were born somewhere else in Switzerland, and 53 or 9.6% were born outside of Switzerland.

As of 2010, children and teenagers (0–19 years old) make up 22.1% of the population, while adults (20–64 years old) make up 57.6% and seniors (over 64 years old) make up 20.2%.

As of 2000, there were 226 people who were single and never married in the municipality. There were 276 married individuals, 32 widows or widowers and 17 individuals who are divorced.

As of 2000, there were 63 households that consist of only one person and 25 households with five or more people. In 2000, a total of 209 apartments (70.6% of the total) were permanently occupied, while 64 apartments (21.6%) were seasonally occupied and 23 apartments (7.8%) were empty. As of 2010, the construction rate of new housing units was 1.8 new units per 1000 residents. The vacancy rate for the municipality, in 2011, was 1.25%.

The historical population is given in the following chart:

== Heritage sites of national significance ==
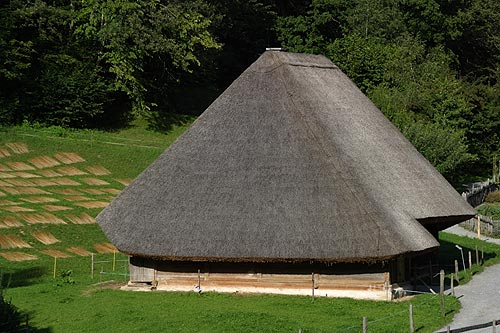
One of the representative buildings at the Schweizerisches Freilichtmuseum Ballenberg

The Schweizerisches Freilichtmuseum Ballenberg (Ballenberg Open Air Museum) is listed as a Swiss heritage site of national significance.

== Politics ==
In the 2011 federal election the most popular party was the Swiss People's Party (SVP) which received 36.2% of the vote. The next three most popular parties were the Conservative Democratic Party (BDP) (22.4%), the Green Party (10.3%) and the Social Democratic Party (SP) (8.1%). In the federal election, a total of 227 votes were cast, and the voter turnout was 53.7%.

== Economy ==
As of 2011, Hofstetten bei Brienz had an unemployment rate of 1.54%. As of 2008, there were a total of 313 people employed in the municipality. Of these, there were 32 people employed in the primary economic sector and about 13 businesses involved in this sector. 78 people were employed in the secondary sector and there were 12 businesses in this sector. 203 people were employed in the tertiary sector, with 16 businesses in this sector. There were 297 residents of the municipality who were employed in some capacity, of which females made up 43.4% of the workforce.

In 2008 there were a total of 186 full-time equivalent jobs. The number of jobs in the primary sector was 18, of which 17 were in agriculture and 2 were in forestry or lumber production. The number of jobs in the secondary sector was 61 of which 18 or (29.5%) were in manufacturing and 44 (72.1%) were in construction. The number of jobs in the tertiary sector was 107. In the tertiary sector; 7 or 6.5% were in wholesale or retail sales or the repair of motor vehicles, 9 or 8.4% were in a hotel or restaurant, 3 or 2.8% were technical professionals or scientists, 19 or 17.8% were in education and 2 or 1.9% were in health care.

In 2000, there were 62 workers who commuted into the municipality and 183 workers who commuted away. The municipality is a net exporter of workers, with about 3.0 workers leaving the municipality for every one entering. Of the working population, 11.8% used public transportation to get to work, and 50.2% used a private car.

== Religion ==
From the 2000 census, 65 or 11.8% were Roman Catholic, while 408 or 74.0% belonged to the Swiss Reformed Church. Of the rest of the population, there was 1 member of an Orthodox church, there was 1 individual who belongs to the Christian Catholic Church, and there were 49 individuals (or about 8.89% of the population) who belonged to another Christian church. There were 6 (or about 1.09% of the population) who were Islamic. There were 5 individuals who were Buddhist and 1 person who was Hindu. 24 (or about 4.36% of the population) belonged to no church, are agnostic or atheist, and 15 individuals (or about 2.72% of the population) did not answer the question.

== Education ==
In Hofstetten bei Brienz about 239 or (43.4%) of the population have completed non-mandatory upper secondary education, and 35 or (6.4%) have completed additional higher education (either university or a Fachhochschule). Of the 35 who completed tertiary schooling, 68.6% were Swiss men, 22.9% were Swiss women.

The Canton of Bern school system provides one year of non-obligatory Kindergarten, followed by six years of Primary school. This is followed by three years of obligatory lower Secondary school where the students are separated according to ability and aptitude. Following the lower Secondary students may attend additional schooling or they may enter an apprenticeship.

During the 2010-11 school year, there were a total of 164 students attending classes in Hofstetten bei Brienz. There were 2 kindergarten classes with a total of 35 students in the municipality. Of the kindergarten students, 5.7% have a different mother language than the classroom language. The municipality had 6 primary classes and 94 students. Of the primary students, 1.1% were permanent or temporary residents of Switzerland (not citizens) and 4.3% have a different mother language than the classroom language. During the same year, there were 2 lower secondary classes with a total of 35 students. 2.9% have a different mother language than the classroom language.

As of 2000, there were 5 students in Hofstetten bei Brienz who came from another municipality, while 41 residents attended schools outside the municipality.
