= Ballenberg =

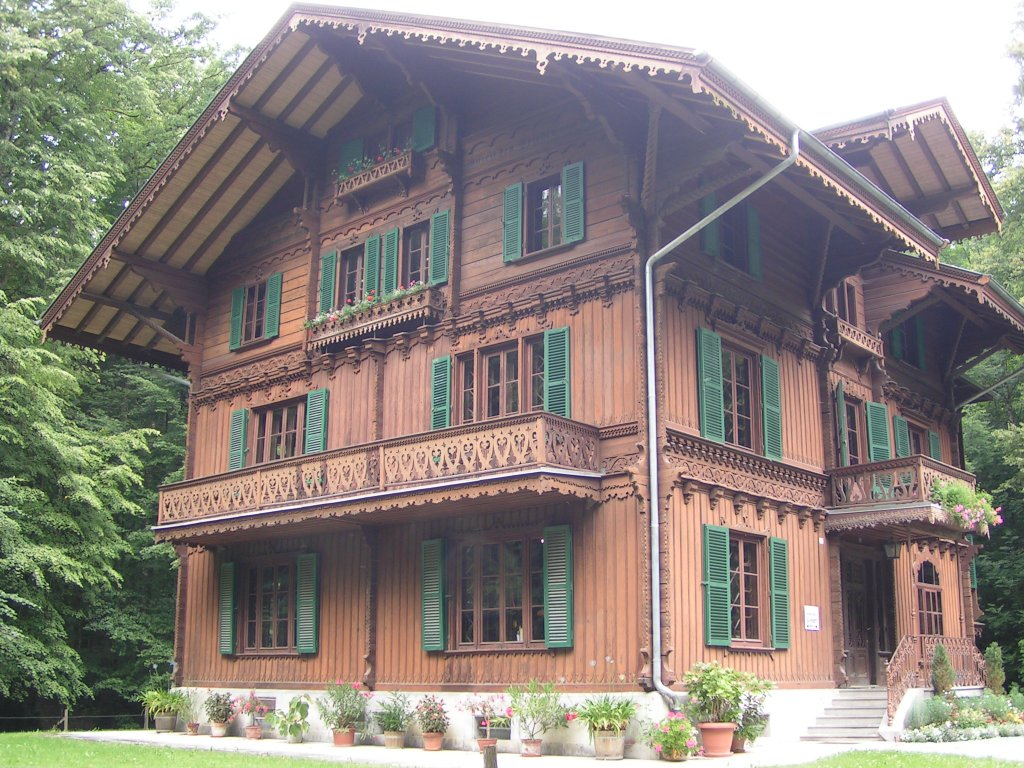
- A Bernese Midlands area house in Ballenberg

- Location within Canton of Bern Location within Switzerland
- Established: 1978
- Location: Hofstetten bei Brienz, Brienzwiler, Bern, Switzerland
- Coordinates: 46°44′58″N 8°05′11″E
- Type: Open-air museum
- Key holdings: Swiss farm houses
- Website: www.ballenberg.ch/en/

Swiss Cultural Property of National Significance

Ballenberg is an open-air museum in Switzerland that displays traditional buildings and architecture from all over the country. Located near Brienz in the municipality of Hofstetten bei Brienz, Canton of Bern, Ballenberg has over 100 original buildings that have been transported from their original sites. It is a Swiss heritage site of national significance.

In addition to the main attraction of the buildings themselves, some of the industrial and crafting buildings still operate to give demonstrations of traditional rural crafts, techniques and cheesemaking. There is also a sizable number of farmyard animals in the grounds.

Founded in 1978, the museum features buildings from all over the country and has structures from almost all of the cantons. The buildings are set in surroundings appropriate to their type (farm buildings surrounded by small fields etc.) with pathways snaking across the 660,000 square metres (164 acre) site. Most buildings allow the visitor to walk around the rooms, each recreated from the time period of the building or brought over wholesale when the building was transplanted.

The museum is divided into the various regions of Switzerland with the structures carefully chosen to give a view of traditional architecture from those areas. The regions represented are:

- Alpine - the higher mountain areas of the cantons of Bern, Graubünden, Nidwalden, Obwalden and Valais
- Bernese Midlands - from the central region of the Canton of Bern.
- Bernese Oberland - the higher areas of southern Canton of Bern.
- Central Midlands - the central region of the Canton of Aargau.
- Central Switzerland - cantons of Nidwalden, Obwalden and parts of Luzern, Schwyz, Uri and Zug.
- East Midlands - the Canton of Zurich and some areas of the cantons of Schaffhausen and Thurgau.
- Eastern Switzerland - the central valley areas of Appenzell Ausserrhoden, Appenzell Innerrhoden and St. Gallen.
- Jura - the central regions of the cantons of Jura, Neuchâtel and the northern areas of Vaud.
- The Valais - the valley areas of the Canton of Valais.
- Ticino - the central areas of Ticino.
- West Midlands - central Fribourg and Vaud.

== See also ==
- Architecture of Switzerland
- List of museums in Switzerland
- List of open-air and living history museums
- Tourism in Switzerland
