= Brünig Pass =

Mountain pass which connects the Bernese Oberland and central Switzerland

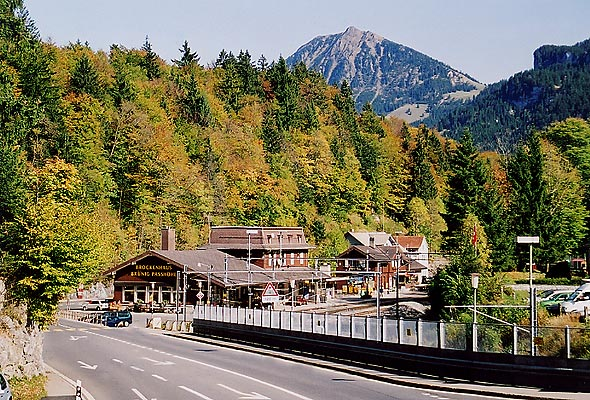
- View of the pass, showing the railway station

- Location within Switzerland
- Elevation: 1,008 metres (3,307 ft)
- Traversed by: Road, rail

Third Approach
- Location: Bern/Obwalden, Switzerland
- Range: Alps
- Coordinates: 46°45′28″N 08°08′16″E

The Brünig Pass, at an altitude of 1,008 m (3,307 ft), connects the Bernese Oberland and central Switzerland, linking Meiringen in the canton of Bern and Lungern in the canton of Obwalden. It is on the watershed between the upper reaches of the Aare, which flows through Lake Brienz and Lake Thun, and the Sarner Aa, which flows into Lake Lucerne.

The pass is crossed by the Zentralbahn's Brünig railway line, between Lucerne and Interlaken, and that line's Brünig-Hasliberg station is situated in the pass. The pass is also crossed by the A8 motorway, between Lucerne and Spiez. Both rail and road crossings are normally kept open throughout the winter.

The Brünig Pass provides access to nearby attractions, including the Giessbach Waterfalls, cascading over 500 metres into the lake. The nearby Aare Gorge offers a walkway through towering limestone cliffs, while the Susten Pass provides scenic alpine views in summer. Further afield, the Lauterbrunnen Valley, with its 72 waterfalls, showcases the natural beauty of the region.

The pass is the starting or finishing point of many hikes. Particularly popular is the route to or from the Brienzer Rothorn, which is accessible by rail at both ends.

The pass was on a general transport route with the southern Grimsel and Gries passes connecting central Switzerland with present-day Italian Domodossola. It is assumed the route was in use since Roman times, when the Romans controlled Vindonissa.

In 1339 the warriors of central Switzerland marched towards the Battle of Laupen over the Brünig pass. In 1383, warriors of Lucerne, Schwyz and Uri among others crossed over the Brünig pass to support the Bernse troops in the siege of Burgdorf.

In 1856 the Federal funds led to the construction of a street over the pass. In 1861 the road was completed and inaugurated. In the 19th century and before the inauguration of the Brünig railway, up to 120 private carriages and post wagons shall have crossed the pass.

The pass is the subject of a watercolour painting by J. M. W. Turner, entitled The Brunig Pass, from Meiringen, and dating from c.1847-8.

== See also ==
- List of highest paved roads in Europe
- List of mountain passes
- List of the highest Swiss passes
