= Béziers to Neussargues Railway =

French rail transport

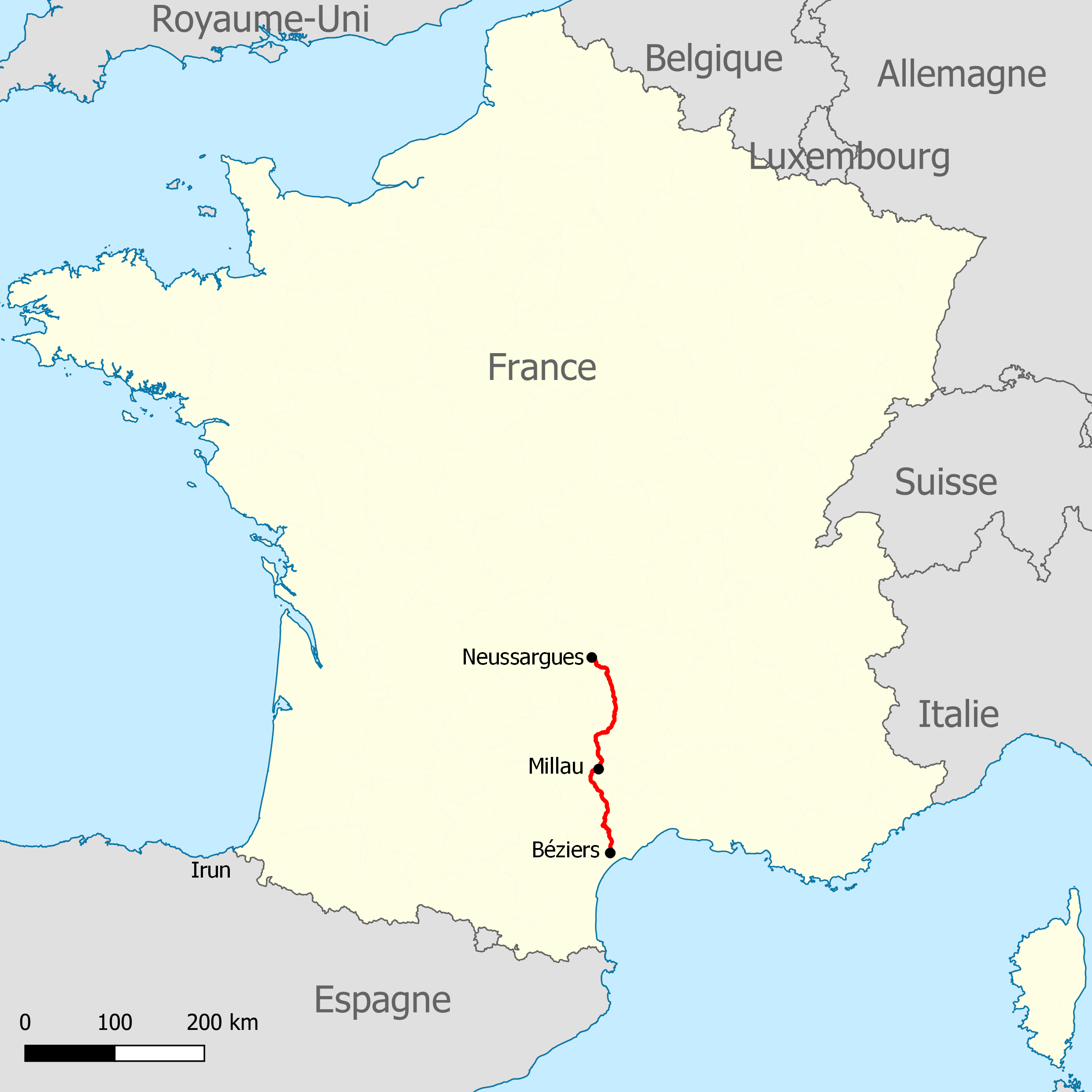
- Railway map

Overview
- Owner: SNCF
- Line number: 722 000
- Locale: France

Service
- Services: Béziers, Millau
- Operator(s): SNCF

History
- Opened: 1858 – 1888

Technical
- Line length: 277 km (172 mi)
- Number of tracks: Single track (Formerly double track on certain sections)
- Track gauge: Standard-gauge railway (1,435 m)
- Electrification: 1500 V DC
- Signalling: BAPR
- Maximum incline: 33,5 ‰

The Béziers to Neussargues Railway, also known as the Causses Railway, is a French rail transport connecting Béziers, near the Languedoc coast, to Neussargues in the department of Cantal, crossing the Millau and the Causses plateaus.

It is designated as line 722,000 of the French railway network.

This railway is known for its unusual features, standing out for its winding route and relatively few tunnels (compared to the Cévennes Railway, for example). Despite this, it boasts maximum gradients of 35‰, making it a challenging route for railway workers. The engineering structures of this railway are notable in quantity and quality; among these, the Garabit Viaduct (near Saint-Flour), designed by Eiffel, is the most well known. Other viaducts (in masonry or metal), as well as the electrical installations and period buildings, characteristic of the Midi Company, are attractive points for curious visitors.

== History ==
=== From Graissessac to Béziers ===
==== Origin ====
The history of this railway line dates back to a request for a railway connecting Graissessac (Hérault) to Béziers to facilitate the mining products transportation. The concession for the railway was authorized on 27 March 1852, and the agreement was approved. Subsequently, the Company of the Graissessac Railway to Béziers was established on 26 February 1853, to oversee and operate the concession.

==== Construction and openings ====
The company began constructing a single-track line with standard gauge, reaching Bédarieux in 1855. The construction of the large viaduct of Bédarieux over the Orb, which started in 1853, was completed in 1857. Due to financial difficulties, the company was placed under sequestration on 12 May 1858, before completing the route. Nevertheless, approval for funding to finish the construction and operate the line was granted on 15 August 1858. The first official train journey, carrying the prefect, the chief engineer of the department, and the sequestration administrator took place on 6 September 1858. The section from Béziers to Bédarieux station opened for goods service on 20 September 1858; and the second section from Bédarieux to Graissessac began operating on 28 December 1858. Passenger traffic commenced on 1 September 1859.

==== Connection with the current railway ====
The section from Béziers to the initial Bédarieux station became part of the first segment of the Béziers to Graissessac line, inaugurated on 20 September, 1858. Subsequently, the section from Bédarieux to La Tour-sur-Orb was then incorporated into the second section, which opened on 28 December, 1858.

==== Railway purchase ====
The agreement signed between the Minister of Public Works and the Chemins de fer du Midi (Midi Company) on 1 May 1863, documents the acquisition of the railway from Graissessac to Béziers, with the price to be determined through arbitration. This agreement also grants the company concession for two lines: one from Montpellier to "Milhau," (Note: Spelling of the Millau commune name at the time.) connecting to the Graissessac-Béziers railway at Faugeres and diverging at La-Tour-d'Orb; and the second from "Milhau to Rodez." The imperial decree approved this agreement on 11 June 1863. The arbitration decision was made on 17 July 1865, setting the purchase price of the railway at 16 million francs. An imperial decree ratified this decision on 23 December 1865.

=== The Midi Company Railway ===
In the mid-nineteenth century, when the Midi Company considered constructing a railway with an ambitious route, the primary goal was not to provide the inhabitants of the Massif Central with scenic views, but rather to access the mining basins in the north of Hérault (at Graissessac) and compete in transporting Languedoc wines to Paris.

In 1863, a commercial agreement between the railway companies stipulated that the network with the shortest route would secure the entire market. However, most trains continued to bypass the Massif Central, opting for routes with more favorable profiles. The opening of the section from Béziers to Neussargues allowed the Midi Company to gain a monopoly on wine transport from the PLM, by offering a 799 km route compared to the 804 km route via the Nîmes to Clermont railway. This monopoly lasted until 1908, when a 784 km line via Saint-Flour and Brioude was established.

The section from Séverac-le-Château to Marvejols, branching off from the Millau to Rodez line at Sévérac-le-Château, was conceded, and the section from Marvejols to Neussargues on an eventual basis, to the Compagnie des chemins de fer du Midi et du Canal latéral à la Garonne under an agreement signed between the Minister of Agriculture, Commerce, and Public Works and the aforementioned company on 10 August 1868. This convention was approved by an imperial decree on the same date. The section from Marvejols to Neussargues was declared of public utility and definitively conceded by a law on 23 March 1874.

The company put its railway into service section by section as the work progressed:

- 11 May, 1872, from La Tour-sur-Orb to Le Bousquet-d'Orb.
- 18 October, 1874, from Le Bousquet-d'Orb to Millau.
- 14 May, 1880, from Millau to Sévérac-le-Château.
- 14 August, 1883, from Sévérac-le-Château to Banassac-La Canourgue.
- 3 May, 1884, the company opened a new section from Banassac-La Canourgue to Marvejols. This section includes the route from Banassac to Le Monastier and Mende, along with a branch line from Le Monastier to Marvejols.
- In 1884, the route between Faugères and the Orb viaduct was modified over approximately 9 km by reconstructing the line further west. This reconstruction includes a new station at Bédarieux, to facilitate the connection with the Castres to Bédarieux railway.
- 9 May, 1887, from Marvejols to Saint-Chély, with two intermediate stations: Saint-Sauveur-de-Peyre and Aumont.
- 27 May, 1888, from Saint-Chély to Saint-Flour, with three intermediate stations: Arcomie, Loubaresse, and Ruynes.
- 10 November, 1888, from Saint-Flour to Neussargues.

From the beginning, the Midi Company deployed its most powerful engines on this challenging railway. Initially, freight traffic was significant, consisting mainly of trains serving the coal basin of Graissessac and those supplying the villages. To enhance the railway's performance and compete with the PLM's Cévennes line, the Midi Company electrified the route at 1500V in stages starting from 1930 with the Béziers-Séverac-le-Château section. Once the line was fully electrified, the first BB Midi locomotives had dominated hauling on the Causses. The SNCF took over the railway in 1938, and it was not until the 1950s that the first electric railcars (Z 7100) replaced the BB Midi locomotives for local service. The first BB 9400 locomotives were introduced in the 1970s, followed by the Z2 railcars in the 1980s. The "Aubrac" tourist train commenced operation in 1984. From the 2000s, a BB8500 locomotive operated the Aubrac service instead of the BB9400. In 2000, recognizing the deteriorating track conditions, a modernization plan initiated. It aimed to replace old rails with long welded ones, upgrade sleepers, and re-ectrify the line at 25000V. However, only a few track sections were rebuilt as part of this plan.

The original route at the Bédarieux level, between the Pétafy and Orb stations (467.800 to 473.890 mileposts), was downgraded by decree on 12 November 1954.

=== Contemporary era ===
Despite some renovation in the early 2000s (30 km renovated in 2000-2001, Herbouze tunnel and section in Banassac renovated), the condition of the line was critical in certain sections. An Aubrac train derailed in 2006 due to the infrastructure state, leading to speed restrictions to be implemented on several sections.

On 8 March 2007, following a report mentioning the poor track condition and the significant risks on the section between Neussargues and Loubaresse (where the Aubrac train had derailed in February 2006), it was decided to close this section to all traffic. Renovation work carried out by RFF costed 7.5 million euros. After completion, the line reopened on 18 July, 2007, allowing trains to travel at 75 km/h instead of 40 km/h following the derailment.

The Aubrac service from Paris to Béziers last operated on 8 December, 2007. Since then, it has been limited to the route from Clermont-Ferrand to Béziers. However, it still operates as an Intercités train and connects with another Intercity service between Paris and Clermont-Ferrand.

On 11 September 2009, the railway was temporarily interrupted between Neussargues and Saint-Chély-d'Apcher due to a crack found in a masonry piers of the Garabit Viaduct during an inspection. Traffic has since resumed.

Since 1 July 2010, the locomotive-hauled train has been replaced by a railcar of type X 73500 while still maintaining its Intercity status.

The line experienced another interruption between Neussargues and Saint-Chély-d'Apcher from 3 December 2020, due to a track incident with no specified end date. Regular train operations resumed on 15 November 2021.

== Characteristics ==
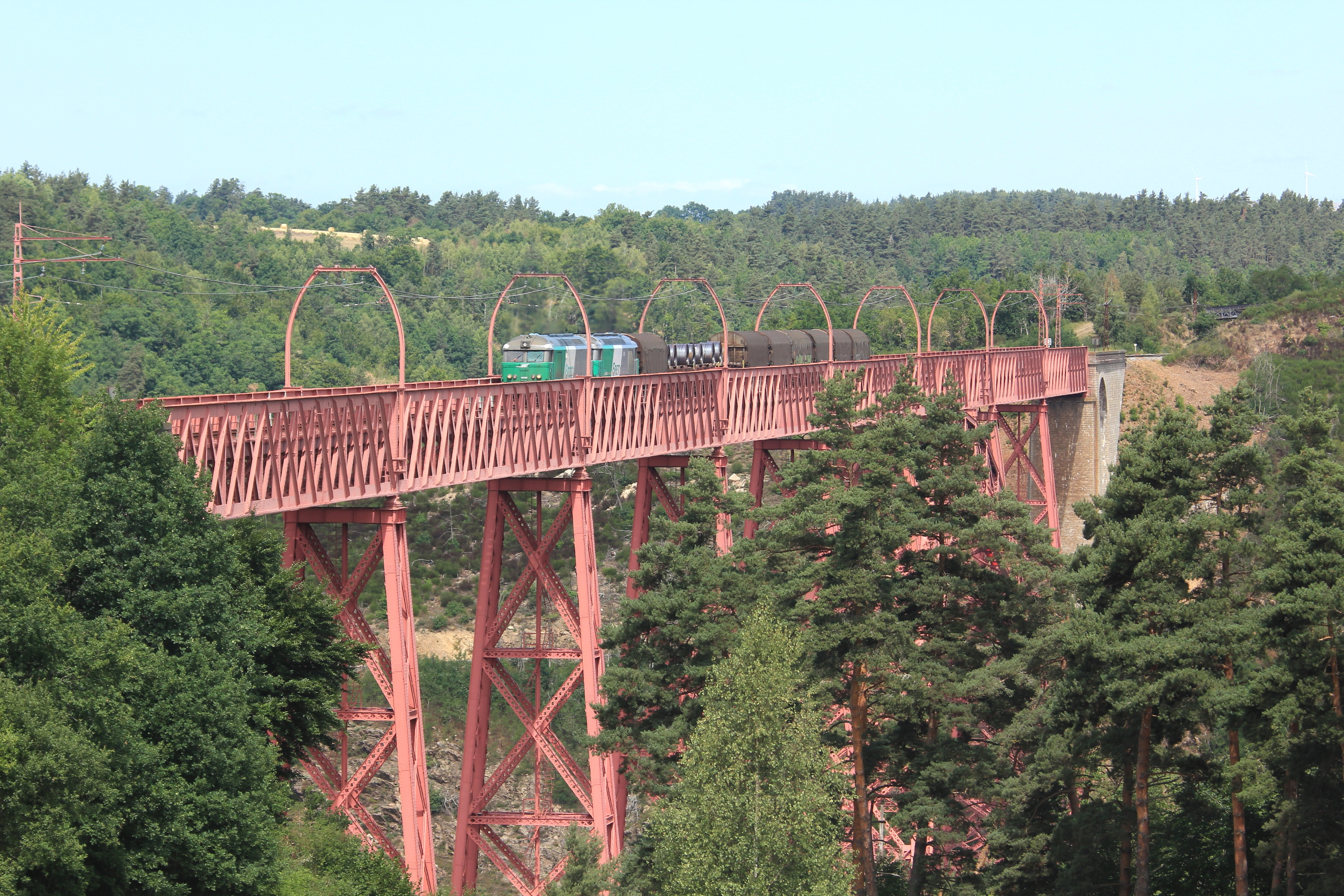
A freight train bound for the ArcelorMittal plant in Saint-Chély-d'Apcher crosses the Garabit viaduct.

The railway line is currently a single track along its entire length. Previously, it was double-tracked in sections from Millau to Saint-Laurent-d'Olt, and from Le Monastier to Saint-Sauveur-de-Peyre. The route features a challenging profile with long gradients reaching 33.5‰. There are nearly 700 curves, with over half having a radius of 300 m.

There are 38 tunnels, the longest being the Pétafy tunnel at 1,850 m in length. The total length of the tunnels is 17.5 km.

Additionally, there are numerous viaducts along the route, with the most notable being the Garabit Viaduct. The Crueize Viaduct, Chanteperdrix Viaduct, and Sénouard Viaduct are also examples of this.

=== Electrification ===
The line was electrified in three stages at 1.5 kV DC:

- from Béziers to Bédarieux on 20 July 1931;
- from Bédarieux to Sévérac-le-Château on 20 October 1931;
- from Sévérac-le-Château to Neussargues on 10 May 1932.

=== Speed limits ===
In 2012, speed limits were imposed on the railway line for AGC trains traveling in odd directions (north to south). Certain types of trains, such as freight ones, typically have lower speed limits.

From (Milepost)	To (Milepost)	Limit (km/h)
Neussargues (708,6 MPs)	Talizat (703,0 MPs)	80
Talizat (703,0 MPs)	Andelat (693,7 MPs)	75
Andelat (693,7 MPs)	Loubaresse (668,1 MPs)	55
Loubaresse (668,1 MPs)	Arcomie (660,6 MPs)	75
Arcomie (660,6 MPs)	Saint-Chély-d'Apcher (652,9 MPs)	90
Saint-Chély-d'Apcher (652,9 MPs)	Aumont-Aubrac (641,9 MPs)	75
Aumont-Aubrac (641,9 MPs)	635,9 MPs	70
635,9 MPs	621,1 MPs	60
621,1 MPs	Banassac - La Canourgue (605,6 MPs)	50
Banassac - La Canourgue (605,6 MPs)	Saint-Laurent-d'Olt (597,7 MPs)	55
Saint-Laurent-d'Olt (597,7 MPs)	Tarnesque (588,6 MPs)	85
Tarnesque (588,6 MPs)	Sévérac-le-Château (579,6 MPs)	85
Sévérac-le-Château (579,6 MPs)	575,6 MPs	80
575,6 MPs	Millau (549,4 MPs)	75
Millau (PK 549,4)	Tournemire - Roquefort (PK 524,6)	80
Tournemire - Roquefort (524,6 MPs)	Montpaon (508,1 MPs)	75
Montpaon (508,1 MPs)	Tête Nord Tunnel Four à Chaux (476,7 MPs)	80
Tête Nord Tunnel Four à Chaux (476,7 MPs)	Laurens (456,6 MPs)	85
Laurens (456,6 MPs)	Béziers (431,6 MPs)	105

== Traffic ==
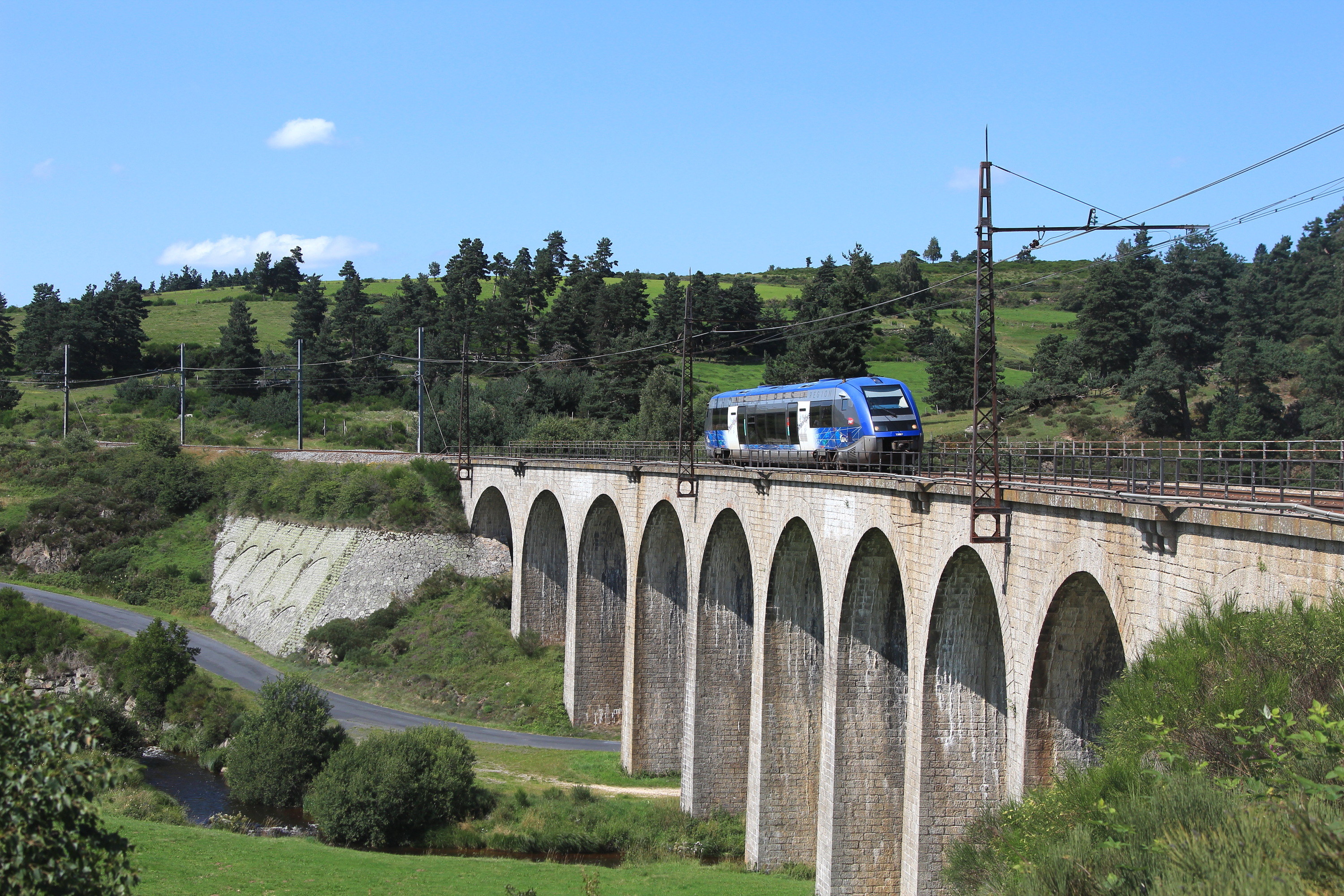
An ATER (X 73500) in Rhône-Alpes livery running the Aubrac downhill route (Clermont-Ferrand - Béziers) passes over the La Rimeize viaduct, between Saint-Chély-d'Apcher and Aumont-Aubrac.

Currently, steel has replaced coal and alcohol. The supply of stell to the ArcelorMittal plant in Saint-Chély-d'Apcher, a major employer in the Lozère region, is facilitated by rail. Annually, 120,000 steel tonnes are transported from Fos-sur-Mer or Dunkirk via the Causses line.

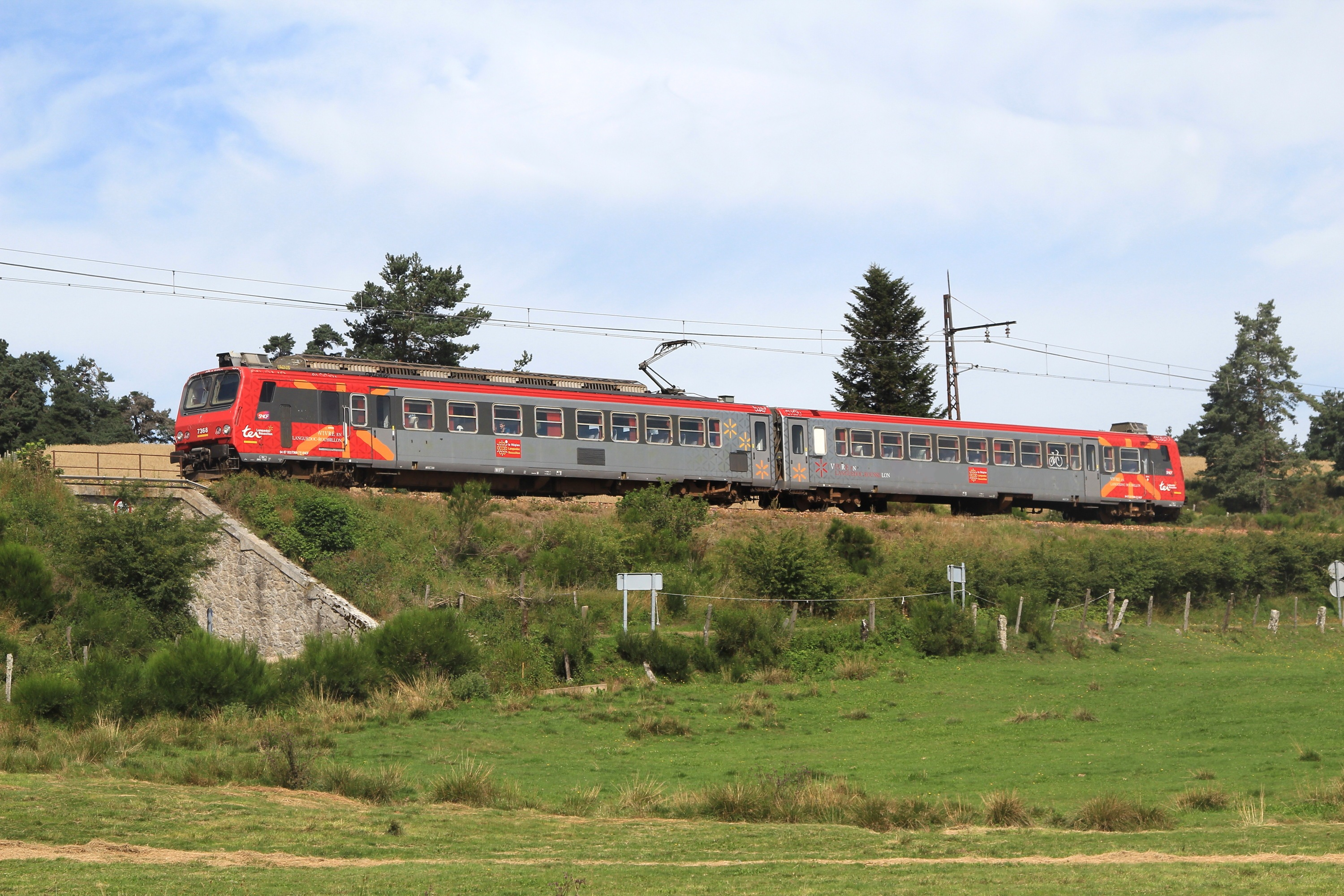
The TER Béziers - Saint-Chély-d'Apcher round trip seen near Aumont-Aubrac. This is the only daily TER service between Millau and Saint-Chély.

Although passenger traffic also plays a role in the railway operation, it faces tough competition from the A75 motorway, which follows the same route but is toll-free (except for the section including the Millau Viaduct) and offers a plethora of access ramps. The Auvergne-Rhône-Alpes region does not provide any TER services on its section of the line, and the Occitanie region now only offers a single daily round trip by TER between Béziers and Saint-Chély, with some additional services from Bédarieux and Millau to the south. Buses are gradually replacing local trains on certain sections of the line. Additionally, the direct night train service (with sleeper cars) between Paris, Clermont-Ferrand, Millau, and Béziers was discontinued in the late summer 2003. Meanwhile, the train known as the Aubrac, recognized for providing a direct and daytime connection from Paris to Béziers via Clermont-Ferrand and the Causses since the 1980s, runs between Clermont and Béziers since 2007. Additionally, a connection to Intercités services to and from Paris is available in Clermont-Ferrand.

The project to extend a TGV line from Paris to Béziers towards Millau, which was agreed upon by the Region, has not seen any progress so far. Only the section between Saint-Chély-d'Apcher and Béziers has been modernized. The Auvergne section still requires modernization (replacing Midi rails with long welded rails). All Midi substations have been computerized (dry rectifiers). The rails between Neussargues and Saint-Chély-d'Apcher have deteriorated due to the use of CC 72000 or CC 72100 locomotives (heavy tonnage) for coil trains. Some sections of the railway were originally designed for two tracks. The Midi company had also anticipated this possibility during electrification (example: Aguessac Viaduct with Midi ogival catenaries identical to those installed in 1927 during the electrification of the Bordeaux-Irun railway).

For logistical and rolling stock reasons, certain Languedoc Roussillon TER services utilize BGC 81500 bi-mode trains to serve Mende and Rodez. The railcar runs in diesel mode on these lines and switches to 1,500-volt DC electric mode on the Causses line (mode change at Sévérac-le-Château and Le Monastier).

Between Neussargues and Saint-Chély-d'Apcher, the Aubrac line is the final passenger train route. The freight train transporting coils from Neussargues to Saint-Chély-d'Apcher is now hauled by two BB 67400 locomotives (although they are old), as the previous BB 75000 locomotives were banned from the line in 2014 due to their track impact.

== Regions crossed ==
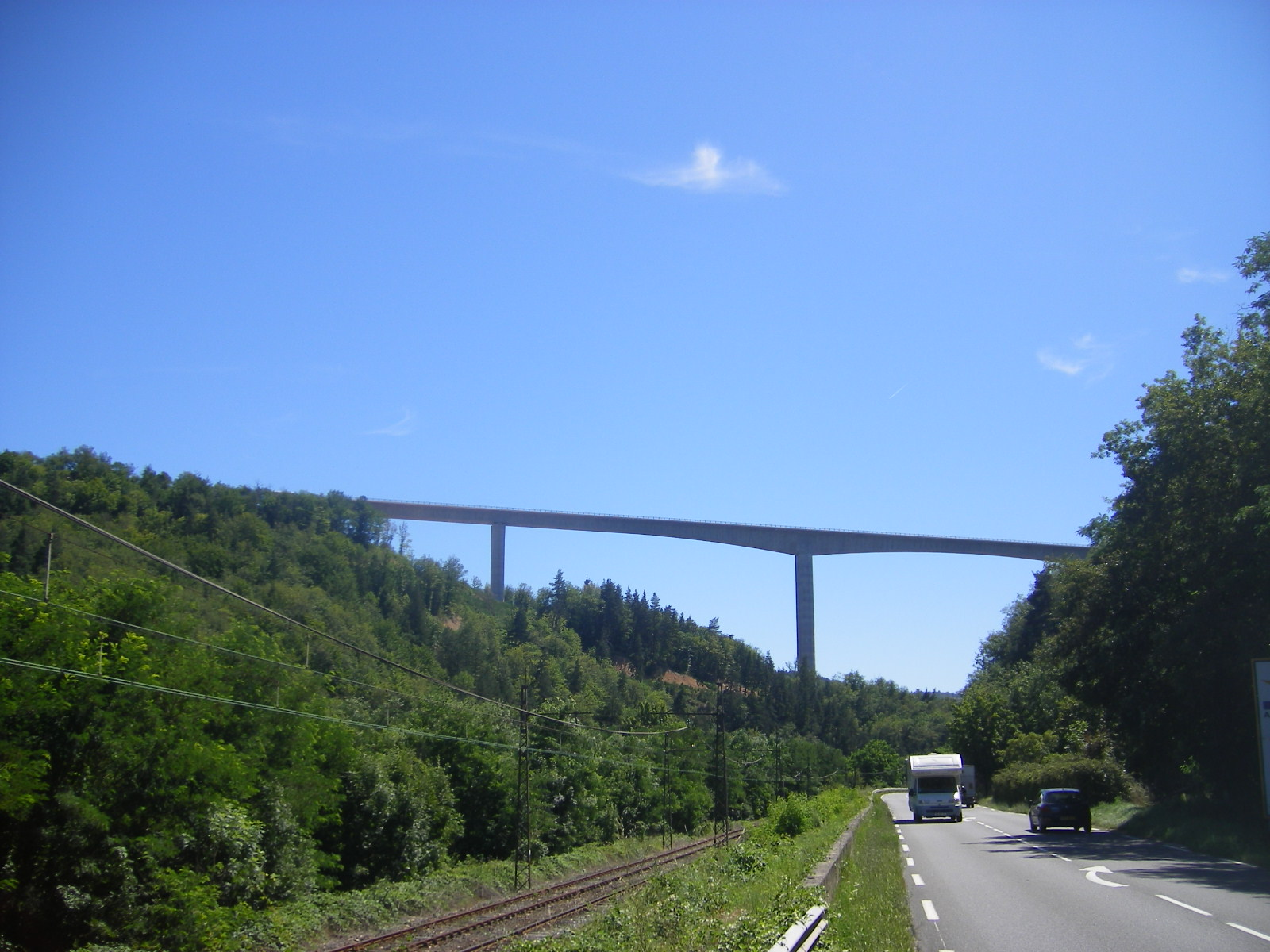
The railway line and the former RN 9 pass under the Colagne viaduct (RN 88) at Bourgs-sur-Colagne (formerly Le Monastier-Pin-Moriès).

- Biterrois Plain
  - Libron Valley
- Haut-Languedoc
  - Orb Valley
  - Orb Mountains
- Causses
  - Larzac
  - Tarn
  - Causse Rouge
  - Causse de Sévérac
- Lot
- Aubrac
- Margeride
- Planèze of Saint-Flour

== Future ==
The closure of the line was announced in 2016 due to inadequate maintenance along the entire Neussargues-Béziers section.

However, there is uncertainty regarding this plan, particularly with the arrival of approximately 1300 French Foreign Legion soldiers on the Larzac plateau by 2018, leading to increased transportation needs for personnel and equipment.

== Project ==
There are plans to create a stopover at Aguessac as part of the reopening of the Rodez to Séverac line, facilitating the resumption of traffic between Millau and Rodez.

Platform 3 at Millau station should also be brought up to standard.

== Photograph gallery ==
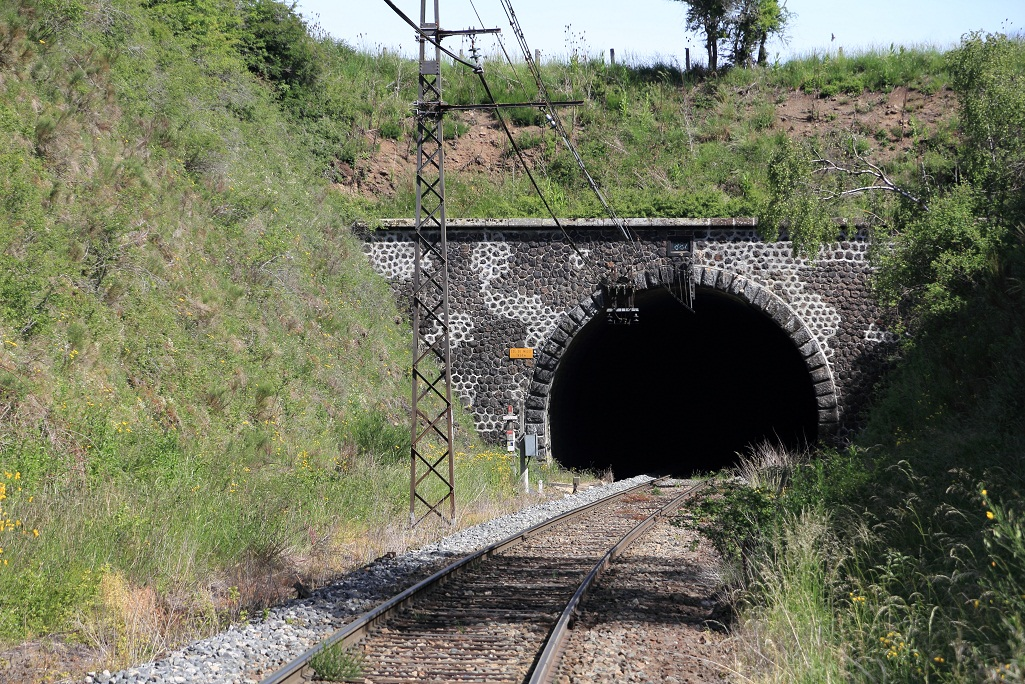
The southern entrance of the Mallet Pass tunnel. (Milepost 703,500)

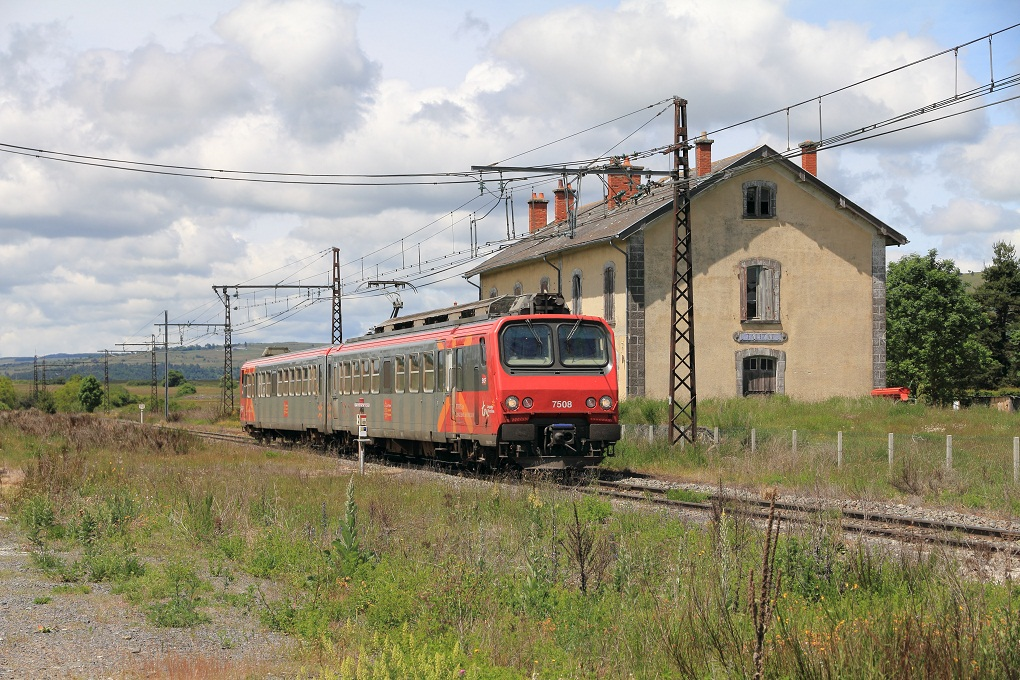
Talizat station with a Z 7500 passing through. (Milepost 702,971)

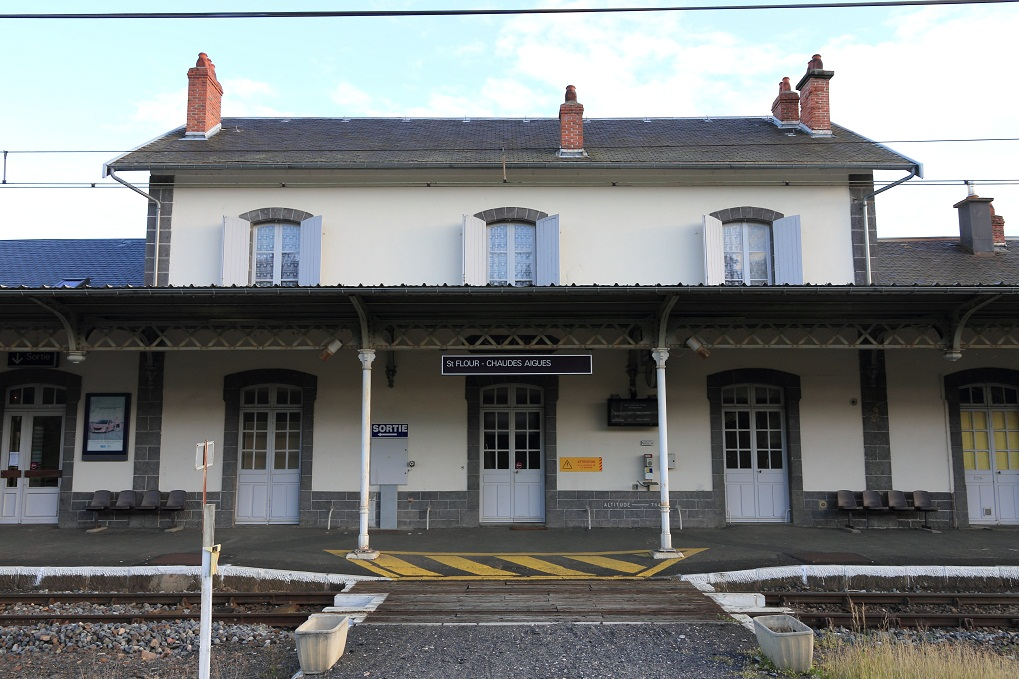
Saint-Flour to Chaudes-Aigues station. (Milepost 689,628)

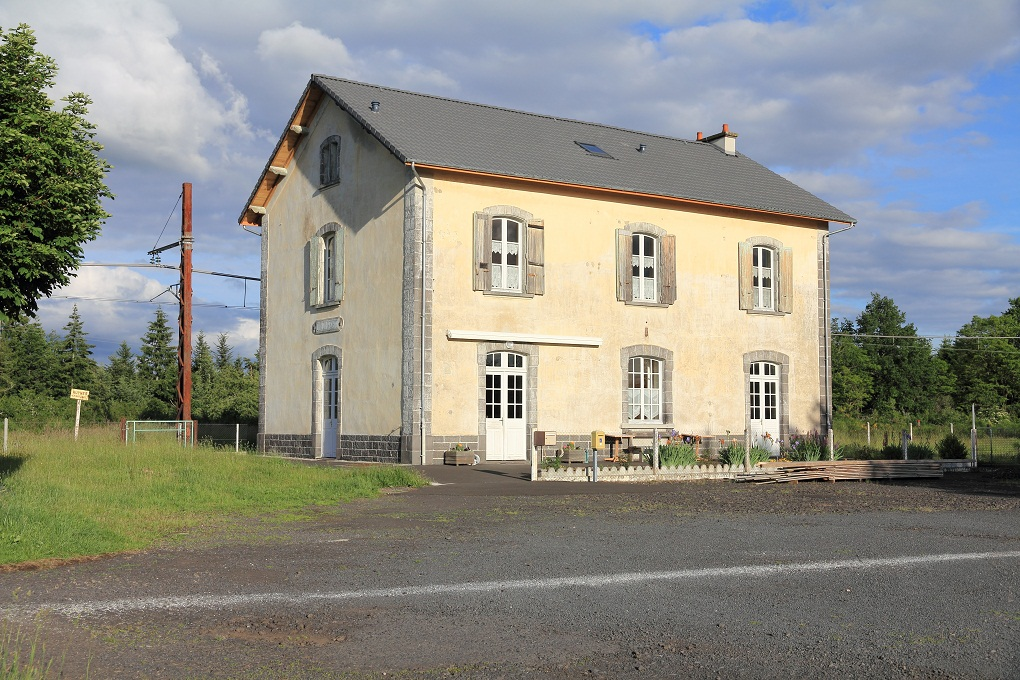
Ruynes-en-Margeride station. (Milepost 678,984)

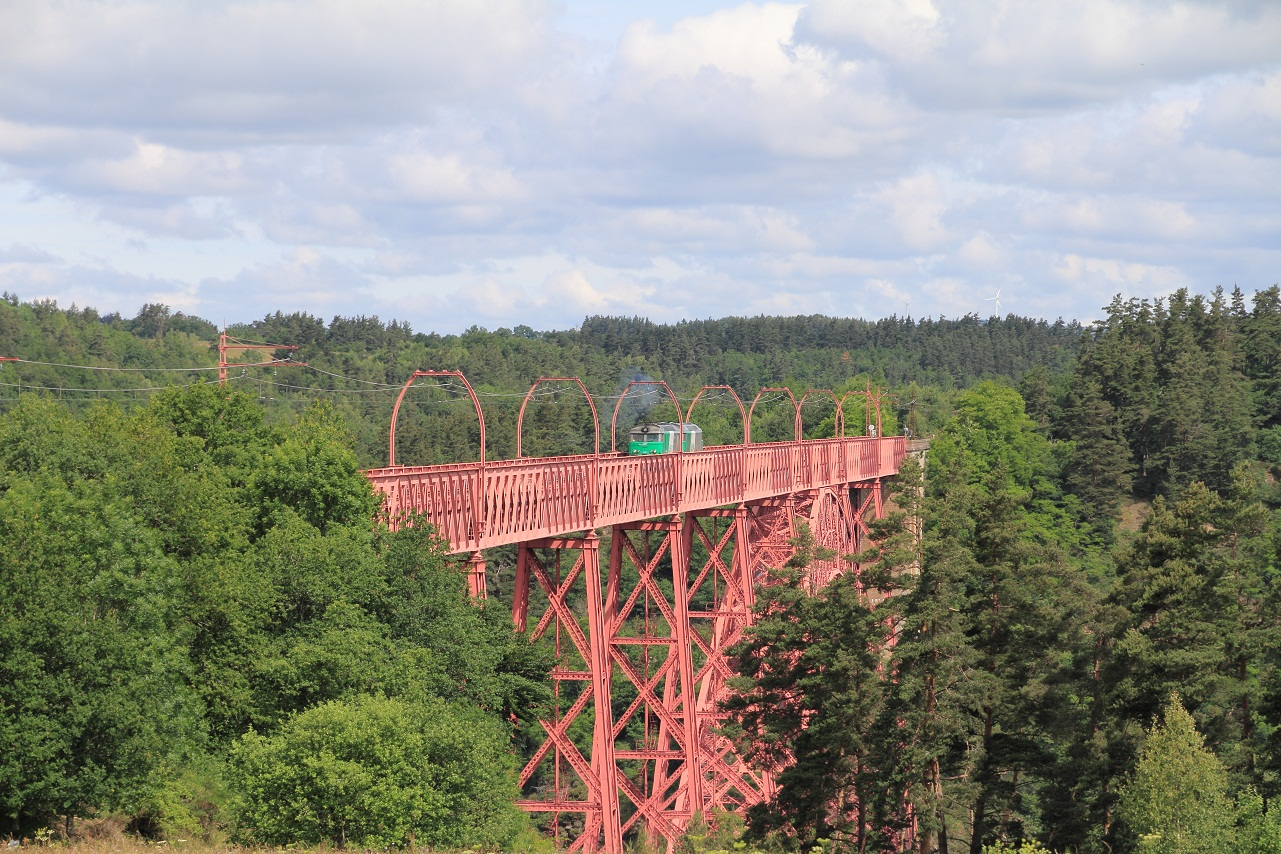
Garabit Viaduct with a BB 67400 locomotive duo passing through. (Milepost 675,688)

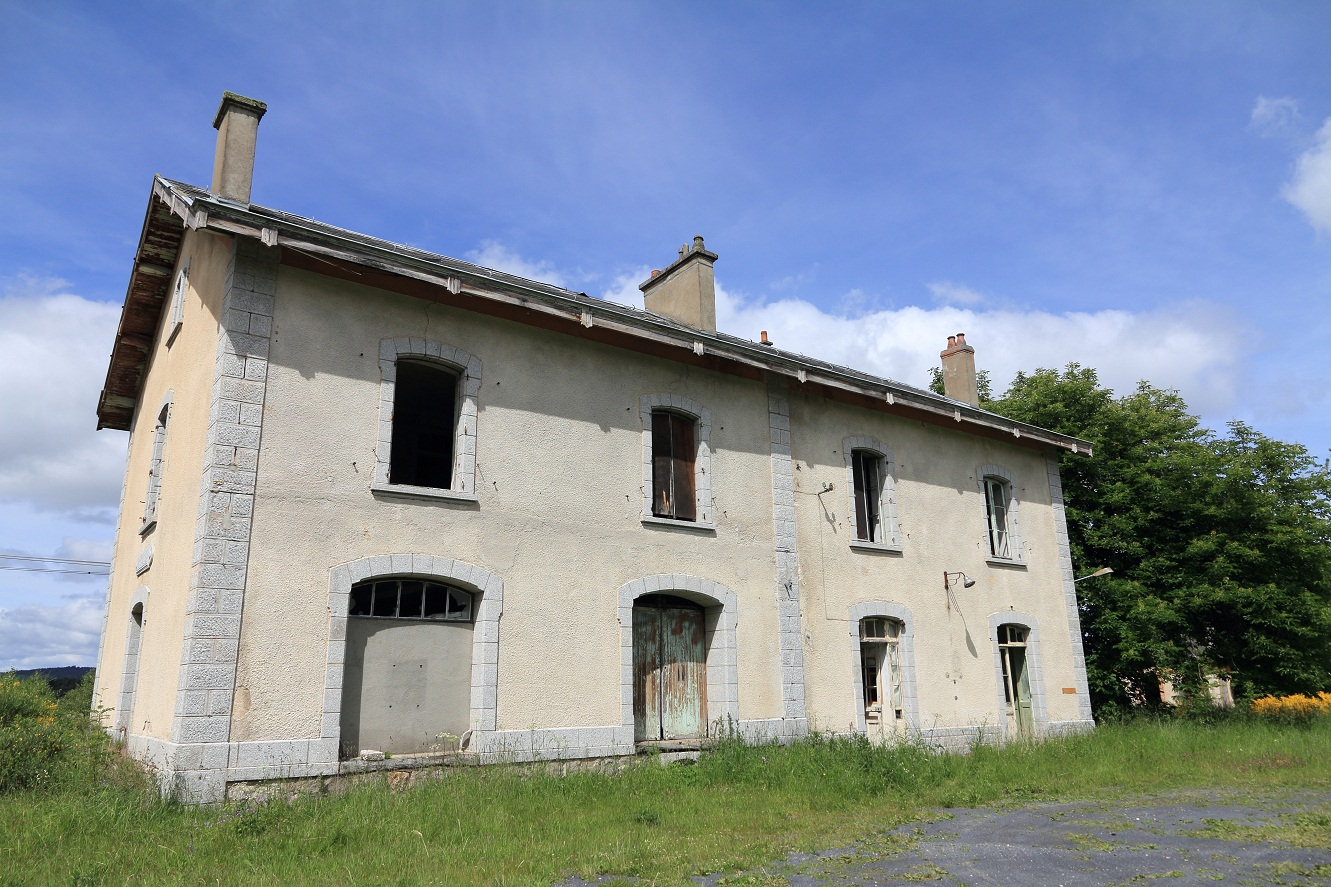
Abandoned Arcomie station. (Milepost 660,600)

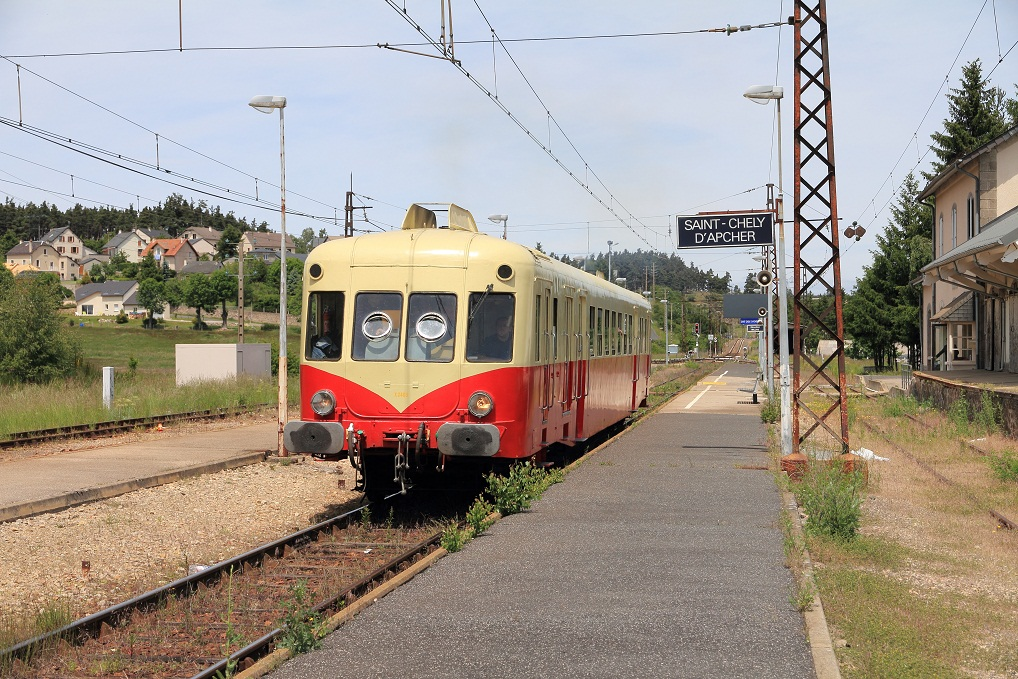
Saint-Chély-d'Apcher station with a X 2400. (Milepost 652,902)

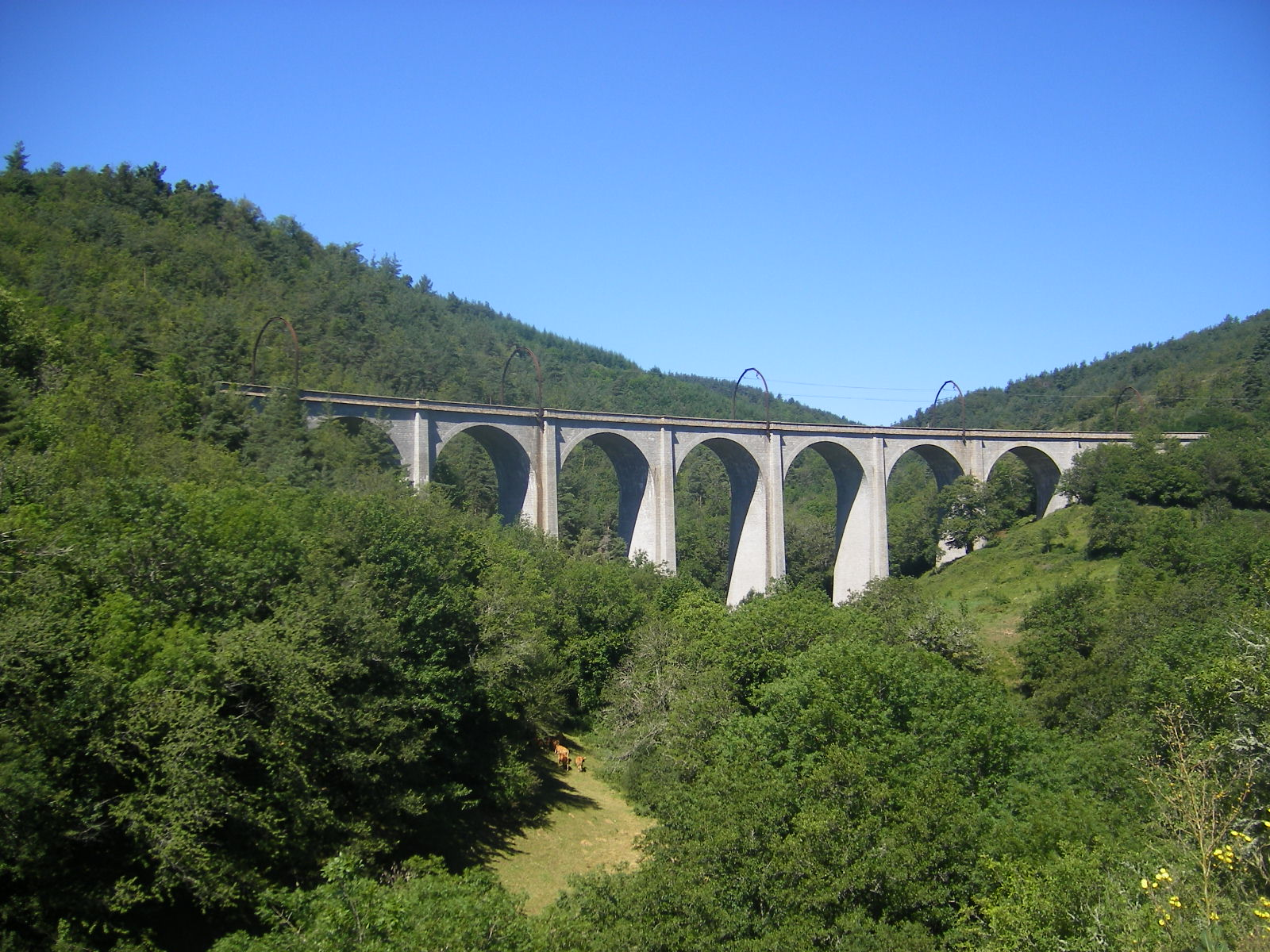
Chanteperdrix Viaduct.

== See also ==
- List of railway lines in France
- Chemins de fer du Midi
