= 1888 in rail transport =

This article lists events related to rail transport that occurred in 1888.

== Events ==
=== February events ===
- February 2 - Frank J. Sprague built an electric light rail system in Richmond, VA, for the Richmond Union Passenger Railway. This was to be the first large-scale electric trolley (tram) line in the world.
- February 24 – Grand Trunk Railway acquires the Northern and Northwestern Railway.
- February 29 – Opening of Listowel and Ballybunion monorail in Ireland.

=== May events ===
- May – The Great Indian Peninsula Railway completes its Victoria Terminus station building in Bombay's Bori Bunder district.

=== April events ===
- April 1 – The Old Colony Railroad leases the Boston and Providence Railroad for a period of 99 years.

=== June events ===
- June 11 – The Canadian Pacific acquires control of the Soo Line, renaming it to the Minneapolis, St. Paul and Sault Ste. Marie Railroad.
- June 15 – The first train to Casper, Wyoming, operating on the Chicago and North Western Railway, arrives.

=== July events ===
- July–August – First "Race to the North": Operators of the West and East Coast Main Lines in Britain accelerate their services between London and Edinburgh.

=== August events ===
- August 7 – Sir William Cornelius Van Horne succeeds George Stephen as president of the Canadian Pacific Railway.
- August 12 – Atchison, Topeka and Santa Fe Railway subsidiary companies complete construction of the final link in what has come to be known as the Surf Line connecting Los Angeles and San Diego.
- August 18 – In the City of Frankfurt am Main, Germany (at the time:German Reich), Frankfurt Central Station (today's name is Frankfurt (Main) Hauptbahnhof) is opened and is - at this time - the world's largest railway station in terms of tracks, ground area covered and passenger capacity. It replaces the three former regional stations, that were located closer to the old city limits, and were then demolished and gave way to a new city quarter named Station Quarter.

=== September events ===
- September 10 – The Chicago, Milwaukee and St. Paul Railway (later to become known as the Milwaukee Road) operates the first passenger train with electric lights (rather than gas lights) in the United States west of Chicago, Illinois, on a train between Chicago and the Twin Cities.
- September 18 – The first revenue train on the Canada Atlantic Railway's Chaudière Extension departs for Chaudière Falls, Ontario (near Ottawa).

=== November events ===
- November 10 – Opening of Saint-Chély–Neussargues line in France over Garabit viaduct.

=== December events ===
- December 29 – First train crosses Poughkeepsie Bridge, New York.

=== Unknown date events ===
- Spring – The Atchison, Topeka and Santa Fe Railway begins through service between Kansas City, Kansas, and Chicago, Illinois, over the railroad's newly completed line.
- First section of metre gauge Brünig railway line in Switzerland opened by Jura–Bern–Lucerne Railway from Brienz over the Brünig Pass to Alpnachstad using the Riggenbach rack system.
- First articulated Mallet locomotive completed, by Tubize of Belgium.

== Deaths ==
=== April deaths ===
- April 19 – Thomas Russell Crampton, English steam locomotive designer who produced the Crampton locomotive type as well as a tunnel boring machine for the Channel Tunnel (b. 1816).

=== June deaths ===
- June 14 – Charles Crocker, a member of The Big Four group of financiers in California (b. 1822).
