= Villa Marguerite =

Coordinates: 45°7′49″N 2°58′41″E

The Villa Marguerite or Château Marguerite is a mansion in Neussargues-Moissac in the Cantal department in the Auvergne region of France.

== History ==
The Villa Marguerite is a late 19th-century French mansion, the present form of which is due to its second owner, Maurice Guibal, a former mayor of Murat, Cantal, who named it after his daughter. Villa Marguerite is a distinctive landmark of Neussargues-Moissac and often features on post cards of the town.
