= Brienz Rothorn Railway =

Rack railway in Bern, Switzerland

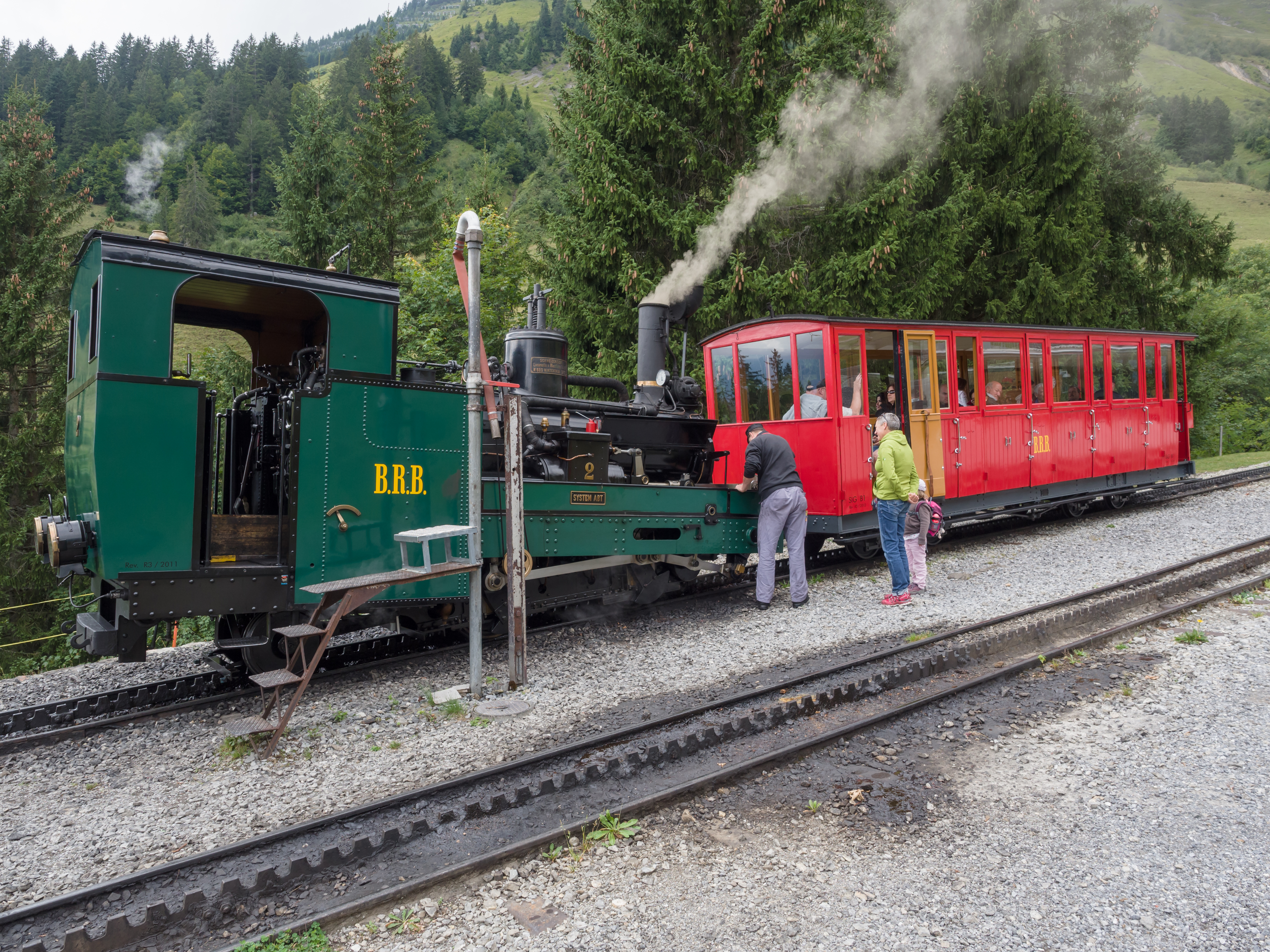
- Steam train with old coach halting at Planalp

Overview
- Native name: Brienz Rothorn Bahn
- Status: Open
- Locale: Canton of Bern, Switzerland
- Termini: Brienz; Brienzer Rothorn

Service
- Type: Rack railway

History
- Opened: 17 June 1892, reopened 13 June 1931
- Closed: 1 August 1914

Technical
- Line length: 7.6 kilometres (4.7 mi)
- Number of tracks: single track with passing loops
- Rack system: Abt
- Track gauge: 800 mm (2 ft 7 1/2 in)
- Electrification: None
- Highest elevation: 2,244 m (7,362 ft)
- Maximum incline: 25 %

The Brienz Rothorn Railway (German: Brienz Rothorn Bahn, BRB) is a tourist rack railway in Switzerland, which climbs from Brienz, at the eastern end of Lake Brienz, to the summit of the Brienzer Rothorn. The railway is 7.6 kilometres (4.7 mi) long, is built to 800 mm gauge (2 ft 7 1/2 in gauge), and uses the Abt double lamella rack system. Unusually for Switzerland, the line is not electrified, and most trains are operated by steam locomotives.

The Brienz Rothorn Railway reaches a height of 2,244 metres (7,362 ft) above sea level and is the highest unelectrified line in Europe and the fourth-highest railway in Switzerland.

== History ==
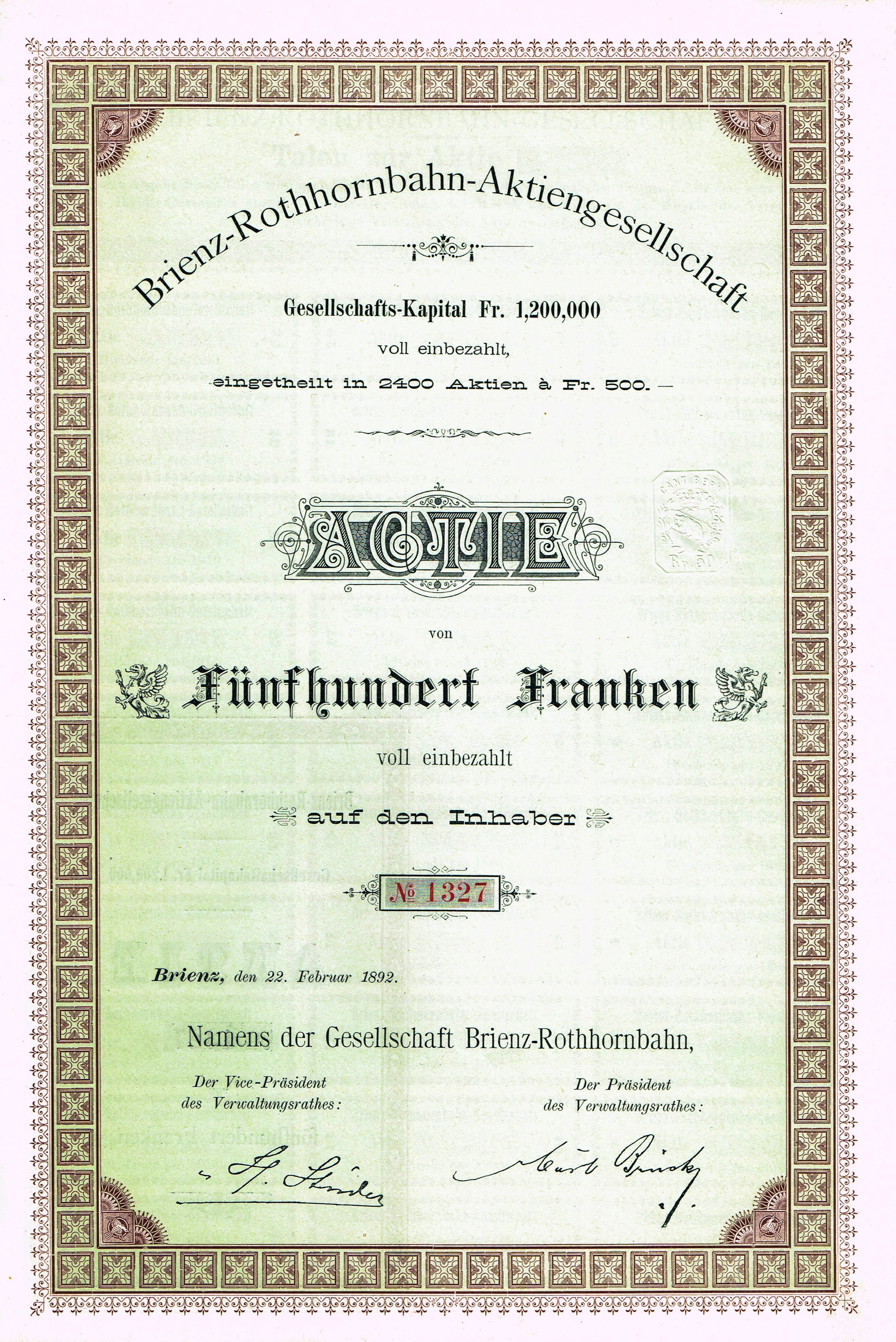
Share of the Brienz-Rothornbahn-AG, 1892

The railway was opened on 17 June 1892, after a two years construction period. The two designers, engineer Alexander Lindner and contractor Theo Bertschinger were supported by the mountain railway pioneer Roman Abt, who had responsibility for equipping the line with his newly developed Abt double lamella rack system.

The line connected at Brienz with the Brünig railway line, which had been opened in 1888 from Brienz eastwards towards Lucerne. However, the Brünig railway was not extended westward to Interlaken until 1916, so many early travelers to the Rothorn had to arrive by boat service on Lake Brienz.

The line was quickly in financial difficulties. The line was designed to carry 25,000 passengers per year, but only managed 5,000 passengers in the first year. Tourist traffic was further affected by the opening of Schynige Platte Railway in 1895 and the Jungfraubahn in 1898. Train service was suspended on 1 August 1914 as a result of the First World War, but did not resume when the war ended.

Essential maintenance was carried out and a small amount of timber traffic was carried from Planalp in 1918. Carriages were hired to the Schynige Platte Railway in 1924 and 1925, providing funds for the maintenance work. The line was finally re-opened on 13 June 1931, the first train to reach the summit in 17 years having run four days earlier. The railway was in good condition because of the continued maintenance.

Unlike other Swiss mountain lines, the BRB was not electrified and this made the railway a special attraction as from 1953 to 1990 it was the only steam-operated line in Switzerland. Although other Swiss mountain railways offer special "steam" trips, this is the only line to offer a full steam service, the Diesel locomotive only being used for additional trains and for light traffic periods.

== Route ==
The BRB is 7.6 kilometres (4.7 mi) long with a maximum gradient of 1 in 4 (25%) and includes five tunnels. It begins in Brienz at 566 m (1,857 ft) above sea level, from a terminus opposite the Brienz station of the Zentralbahn company's Brünig line. Also nearby is the quay used by the BLS AG shipping services on Lake Brienz.

The railway is single track with three passing loops. The first passing loop is at Geldried, 1,019 m (3,343 ft) above sea level. The halfway passing loop of the line is at Planalp station at 1,341 m (4,400 ft) above sea level (the only stop on the line). The older steam locomotives stop to take water. The third passing loop is at Oberstafel, 1,819 m (5,968 ft) above sea level.

The upper terminus of the line is at Rothorn Kulm station at 2,244 m (7,362 ft) above sea level, a little below the summit of the mountain.

A popular hiking trail runs between the summit station, and the Brünig-Hasliberg station at the point where the Brünig line crosses the Brünig Pass.

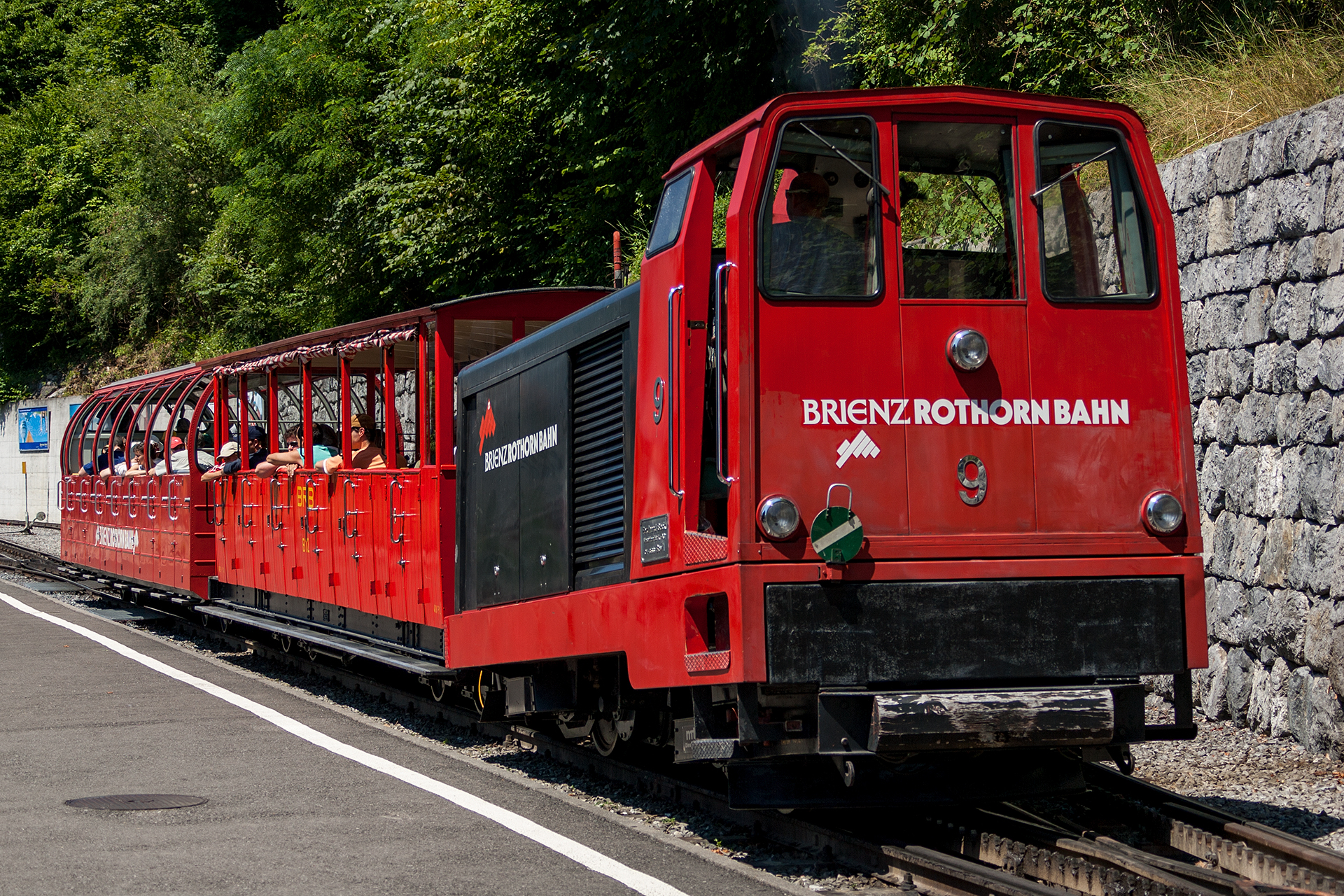
A diesel train at the bottom station

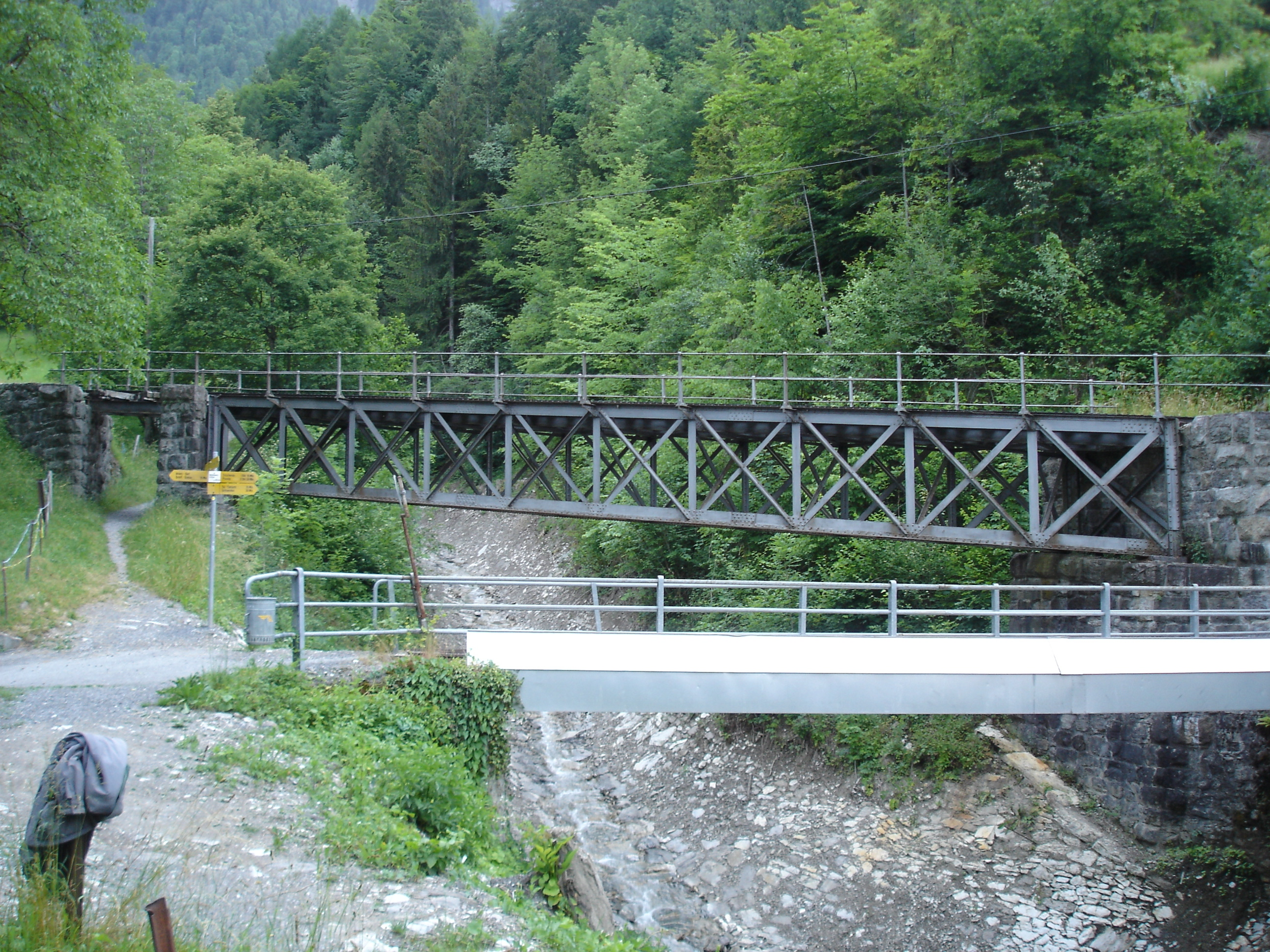
Wellenberg bridge on the Trachtbach

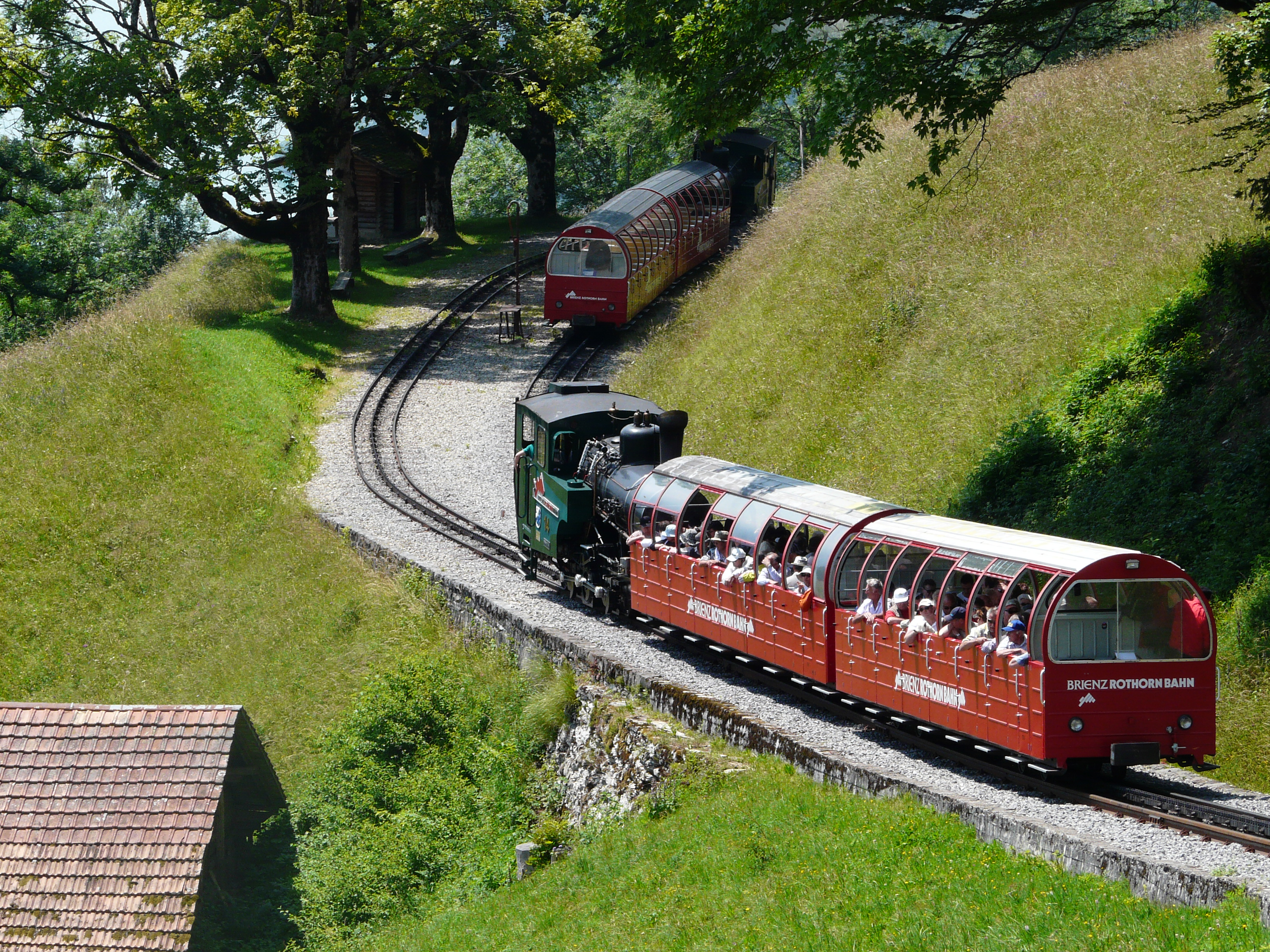
Two steam trains meeting at Geldried

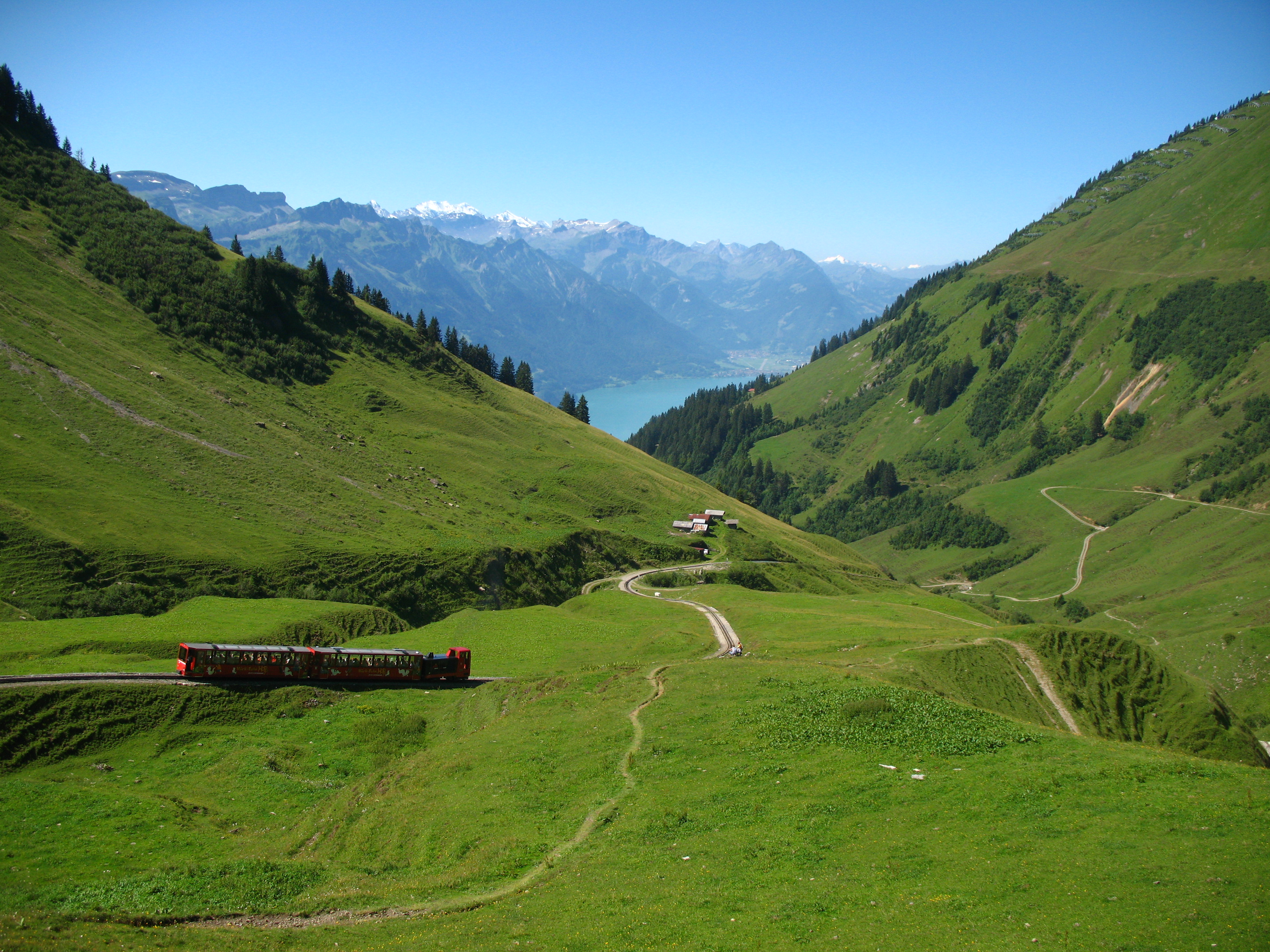
Diesel train above Mittlischten

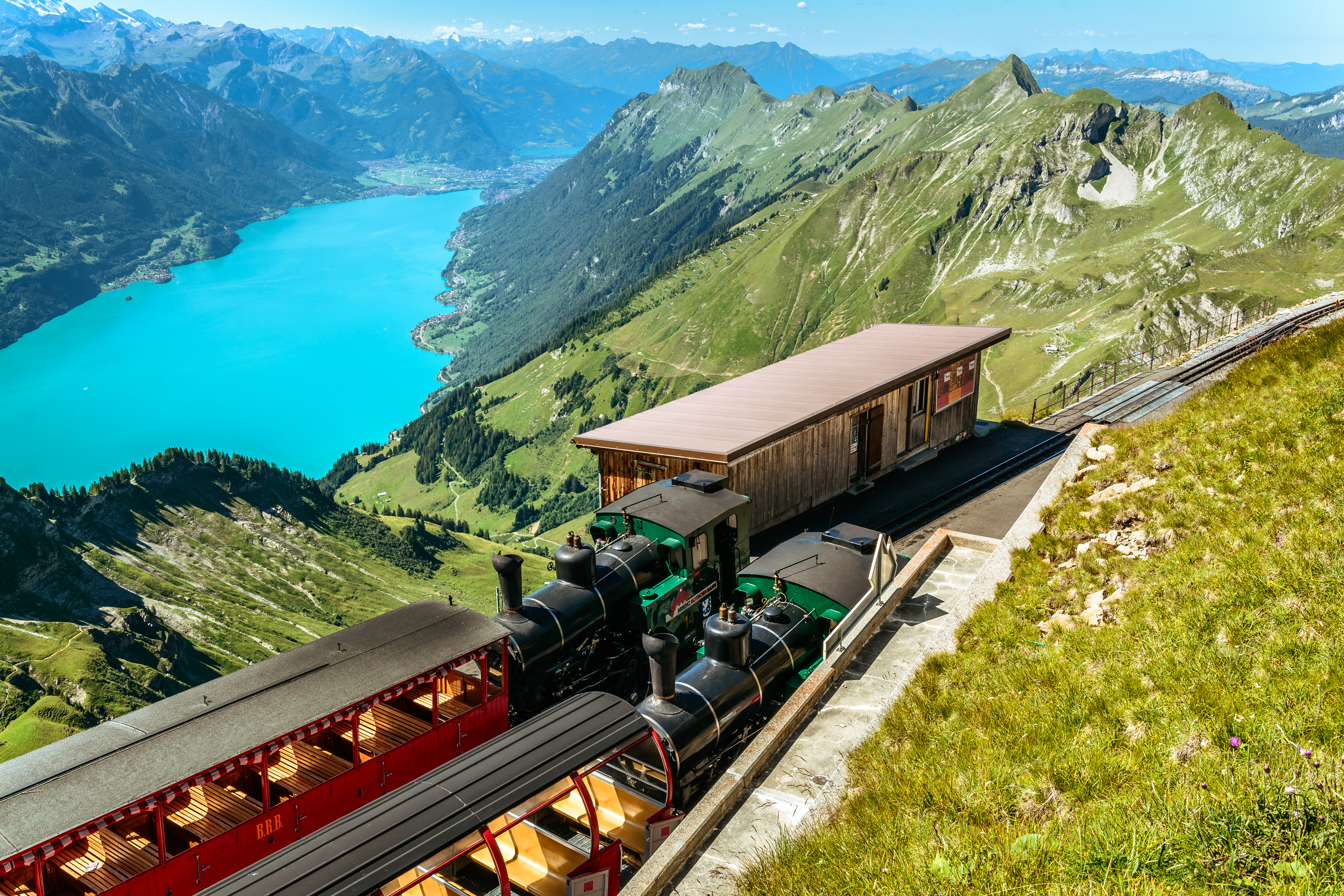
Two steam trains at the summit station. One with a historic coach and the other with a modern coach

== Locomotives and rolling stock ==
All steam locomotives are Class H2/3, indicating that two of the three axles are driven, giving a wheel arrangement (Whyte System) of 0-4-2. The older locomotives are a side tank, "kneeling cow" design of a standard SLM product. The modern steam locomotives use an efficient "light oil" fired steam technology and were built by SLM (former Swiss Locomotive and Machine Works) of Winterthur.

A prototype Diesel locomotive, class Hm2/2, number 8, was delivered in 1973, but sold to the Chemin de fer Montreux-Glion-Rochers-de-Naye in 1995 as their Number 4. New Diesel locomotives were constructed by Ferdinand Steck Maschinenfabrik and are of (Whyte System) 0-4-0 wheel arrangement to a "kneeling cow" design.

Brienz Rothorn Bahn Locomotives
| BRB No. | Builder(s) | Works No. | Year built | Type | Notes |
|---|---|---|---|---|---|
| 1 (I) | SLM | 688 | 1891 | Steam | Scrapped 1961 |
| 1 (II) | SLM | 693 | 1892 | Steam | Ex-MGN, 1962 1892-1941 was Monte Generoso 7 |
| 2 | SLM | 689 | 1891 | Steam | |
| 3 | SLM | 719 | 1892 | Steam | Out of service since 1993. Withdrawn 2005 and displayed at the Steck premises at Bowil. Now returned to the depot in Brienz. |
| 4 | SLM | 720 | 1892 | Steam | Out of service since 1993 |
| 5 | SLM | 690 | 1891 | Steam | Ex WAB1 1912 |
| 6 | SLM | 3567 | 1933 | Steam — Geared | |
| 7 | SLM | 3611 | 1936 | Steam — Geared | |
| 8 | Reggazoni-Buhler-Caterpillar | | 1973 | Diesel-hydraulic | Prototype Class Hm2/2. Sold to MGR, 1995 |
| 9 | Steck | - | 1976 | Diesel-hydraulic | Class Hm2/2 |
| 10 | Steck | - | 1976 | Diesel-hydraulic | Class Hm2/2 |
| 11 | Steck | - | 1986 | Diesel-hydraulic | Class Hm2/2 |
| 12 | SLM | 5456 | 1992 | Steam | |
| 14 | SLM | 5689 | 1996 | Steam | |
| 15 | SLM | 5690 | 1996 | Steam | Named Kanaya after a station on the Oigawa Railway |
| 16 | SLM | 5457 | 1992 | Steam | Ex-MGR 1, 2005 |

Coaching Stock of the Brienz Rothorn Bahn.
| BRB No. | Builder | Date Built | No. of Wheels (Bogies) | Seats | Notes |
|---|---|---|---|---|---|
| B1 | | 1892 | 8 (2 x 2 axle bogies) | 40 | |
| B3 | | 1972 | 8 (2 x 2 axle bogies) | 56 | Arched Roof |
| B4 | | 1972 | 8 (2 x 2 axle bogies) | 56 | Arched Roof |
| B5 | | 1972 | 8 (2 x 2 axle bogies) | 56 | Arched Roof |
| B6 | | 1972 | 8 (2 x 2 axle bogies) | 56 | Arched Roof |
| B7 | | 1972 | 8 (2 x 2 axle bogies) | 56 | Arched Roof |
| B8 | | 1972 | 8 (2 x 2 axle bogies) | 56 | Arched Roof |
| B9 | | 1972 | 8 (2 x 2 axle bogies) | 56 | Arched Roof |
| B11 | | 1892 | 8 (2 x 2 axle bogies) | 48 | |
| B12 | | 1892 | 8 (2 x 2 axle bogies) | 48 | |
| B14 | | 1987 | 8 (2 x 2 axle bogies) | 60 | Lightweight |
| B15 | | 1987 | 8 (2 x 2 axle bogies) | 60 | Lightweight |
| B16 | | 1933 | 8 (2 x 2 axle bogies) | 48 | |
| B21 | | 1892 | 4 | 28 | Semi-open |
| B26 | | 1933 | 4 | 32 | |
| B27 | | 1933 | 6 | 40 | "Bistrowagen" |

== Timetable ==
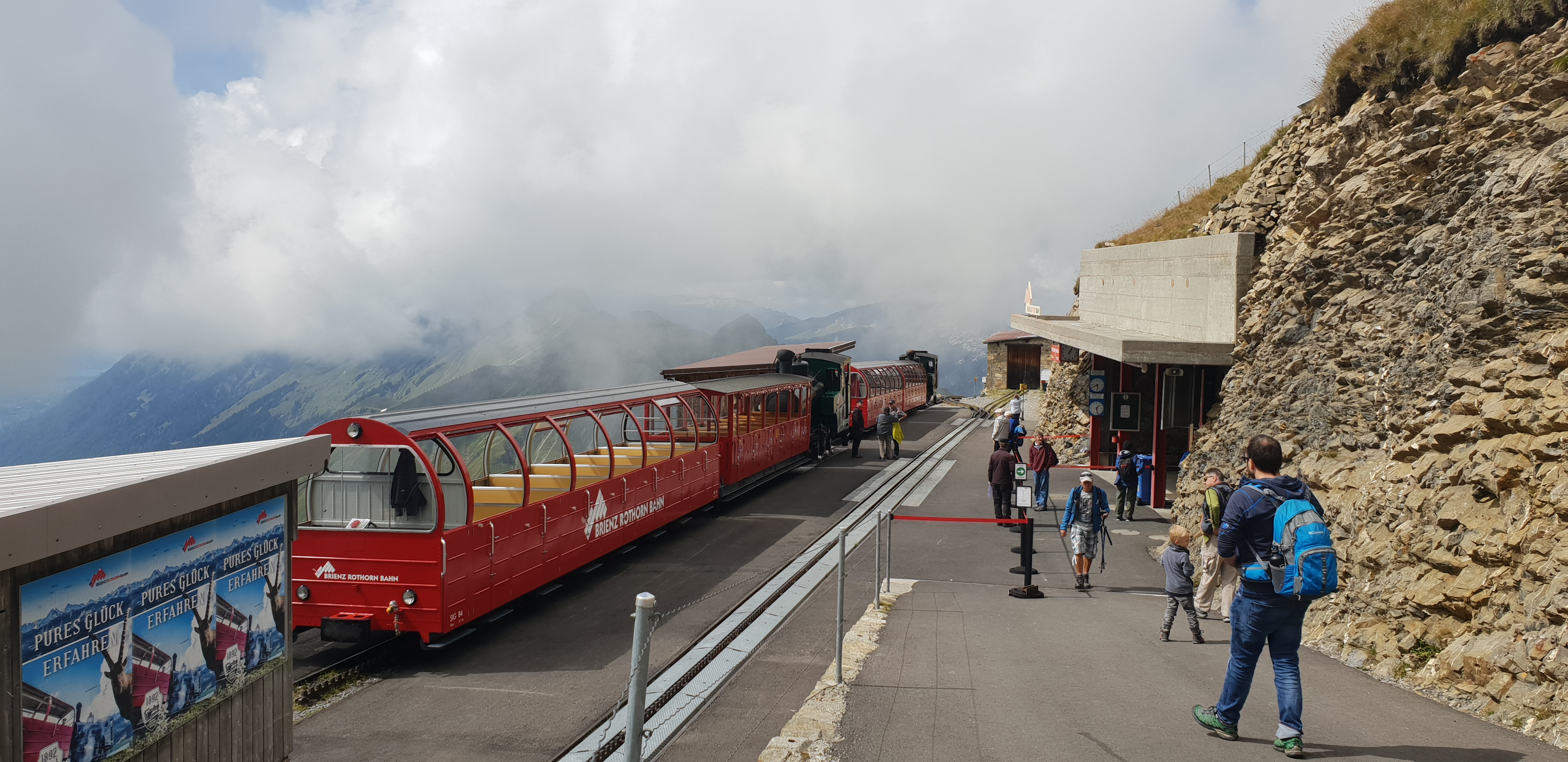
Passengers preparing for boarding at the summit station

The Brienz Rothorn Railway operates 7 days per week from June 6 to October 25, 2026, all the way up to the Rothorn. They try to ensure that all their scheduled passenger services are steam-powered.

Departures from Brienz
| Brienz BRB | 07:36* | 08:36 | 09:40 | 10:45 | 11:45 | 12:58 | 13:58 | 14:58 | 16:36 |
| Planalp | 08:02* | 09:03 | 10:07 | 11:12 | 12:15 | 13:27 | 14:27 | 15:27 | 17:03 |
| Rothorn | 08:36* | 09:31 | 10:35 | 11:43 | 12:45 | 13:57 | 14:57 | 15:57 | 17:31 |

Departures from Rothorn Kulm
| Rothorn | 09:06* | 09:38 | 11:15 | 12:20 | 13:28 | 14:28 | 15:28 | 16:28 | 17:40 |
| Planalp | 09:35* | 10:10 | 11:50 | 12:58 | 14:02 | 15:02 | 16:02 | 17:02 | 18:12 |
| Brienz BRB | 10:10* | 10:38 | 12:20 | 13:30 | 14:32 | 15:32 | 16:32 | 17:32 | 18:40 |

- Only on Saturday and Sunday in July, August and September.

== See also ==
- List of heritage railways and funiculars in Switzerland
- List of mountain railways in Switzerland
