= Brienz BRB railway station =

Swiss railway station

Brienz BRB
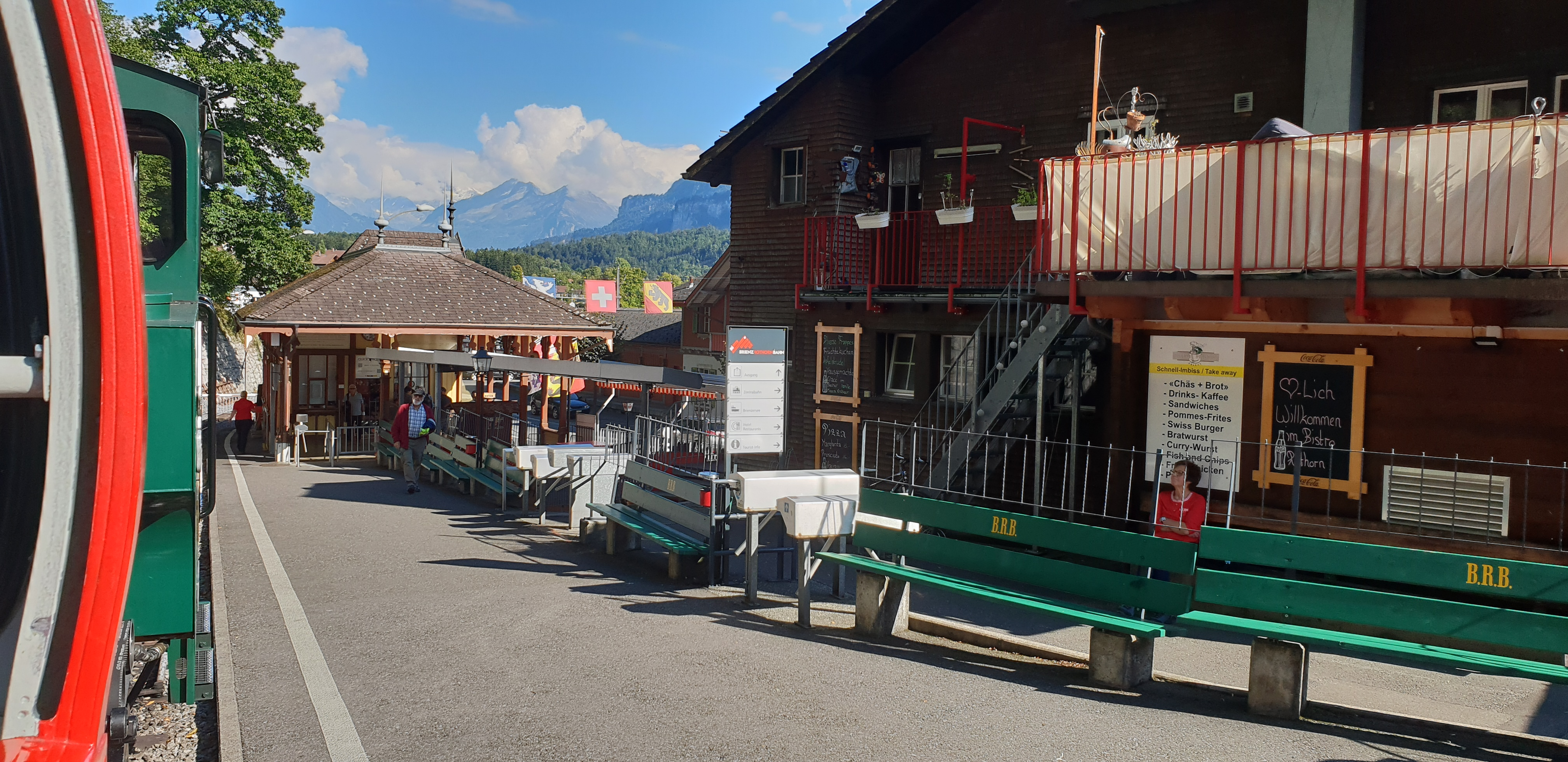
- The station in 2018

General information
- Location: Brienz; Switzerland
- Coordinates: 46°45′18″N 8°02′20″E
- Owner: Brienz Rothorn Bahn
- Line: Brienz–Rothorn line
- Train operators: Brienz Rothorn Bahn

History
- Opened: 1892

Services
Preceding station	Brienz Rothorn Bahn	Following station
Planalp towards Brienzer Rothorn	Brienz–Rothorn line	Terminus
Location
- Location within Switzerland Location within Canton of Bern

Brienz BRB railway station (German: Bahnhof Brienz BRB) is a railway station in the municipality of Brienz, in the Swiss canton of Bern. It is the lower terminus of the Brienz–Rothorn rack railway (BRB) that climbs to the summit of the Brienzer Rothorn mountain.

The station is located across the street from Brienz railway station on the 1,000 mm (3 ft 3 3/8 in) gauge Brünig line of Zentralbahn with service to Lucerne and Interlaken Ost. Connections are also available to the local bus network provided by PostBus Switzerland, and shipping services operated by the BLS AG on Lake Brienz at an adjacent quay. Amongst other destinations, buses link to the Ballenberg open-air museum, whilst boats link to the lower station of the Giessbach Funicular, which gives access to the Giessbach Falls.

The station opened in 1892, four years after the Jura–Bern–Lucerne Railway opened Brienz railway station.

== Services ==
The following services stop at Brienz BRB:

- From June–October: hourly service to Brienzer Rothorn.
