= 1858 in rail transport =

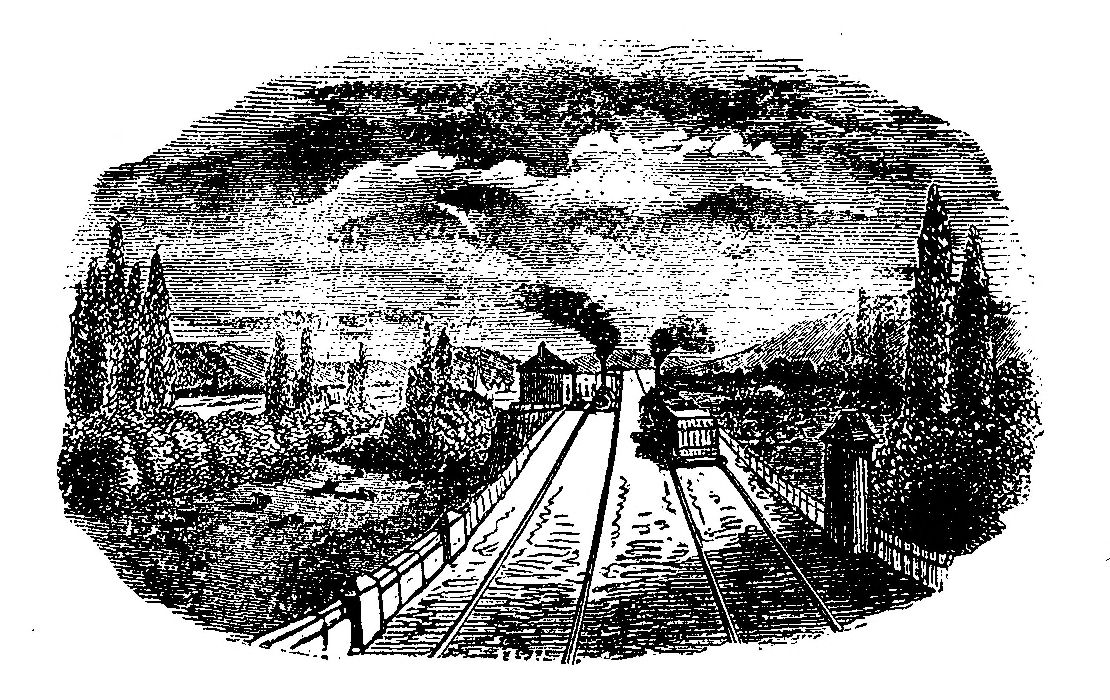
Paris Industrial Guide Illustration

This article lists events related to rail transport that occurred in 1858.

== Events ==
=== April events ===
- April 13 – The Virginia Central Railroad begins operations through the Blue Ridge Tunnel at Rockfish Gap, Virginia.

=== May events ===
- May – First known slip coach working, at Haywards Heath on the London, Brighton and South Coast Railway.
- May 3 – While under lease to Bristol and Exeter Railway, the Somerset Central Railway is extended to Burnham-on-Sea.
- May 31 - Carl Abraham Pihl presents the results of his investigation of the area along the river Drammenselva which concludes that the terrain between Drammen and Randsfjorden, in Norway, is favorable for a rail line.

=== July events ===
- June 17 – The Atlantic and North Carolina Railroad opens, operating 95 miles from Goldsboro to New Bern, North Carolina.

=== August events ===
- August 23 – The Round Oak rail accident in England kills 14.

=== October events ===
- October 30 – The Oriental Railway Company opens the first section of railway in the Ottoman Empire, from İzmir to Seydiköy.

=== September events ===
- John Ramsbottom (engineer) on the London and North Western Railway introduces the first Class DX 0-6-0 goods locomotives. There will be 943 engines built to this design, the largest steam locomotive class in the British Isles.

=== December events ===
- December 15 – Wien Westbahnhof railway station, the terminal of the Western Railway (Austria) in Vienna, opens.

=== Unknown date events ===
- John W. Garrett becomes president of the Baltimore and Ohio Railroad.

== Births ==
=== February births ===
- February 18 – Wilhelm Schmidt, German pioneer of superheated steam for use in locomotives (d. 1924).

=== April births ===
- April 23 - Leonor F. Loree, president of Baltimore and Ohio Railroad 1901–1903, D&H 1907-1938 and Kansas City Southern Railway 1918–1920.

=== December births ===
- December 20 – David Blyth Hanna, first president of Canadian National Railway (d. 1938).

== Deaths ==
=== July deaths ===
- July 31 – Edward Pease, first promoter of the Stockton and Darlington Railway (b. 1767).

=== November deaths ===
- November 25 – Edward Bury, English steam locomotive builder (b. 1794).
