= 1884 in rail transport =

This article lists events related to rail transport that occurred in 1884.

== Events ==
=== February events ===
- February 22 – Brooks Locomotive Works in the United States completes its 1,000th new steam locomotive.

=== March events ===
- March 17 – The Southern Pacific Railroad is incorporated in Kentucky.
- March – Central Pacific Railroad's El Gobernador, at the time the largest locomotive in the world, enters service.

=== April events ===
- April 2 – Melton railway station opens in Melbourne, Victoria, Australia.
- April 26 – The British-owned Buenos Aires Great Southern Railway opens Bahía Blanca Sud railway station in Argentina.

=== May events ===
- May 1 – Nippon Railroad Line, Ueno of Tokyo to Takasaki of Gunma Prefecture route officially completed in Japan.(as predecessor of Takasaki Line)

=== June events ===
- June 11 – The Pine Bluff and Swan Lake Railway, in Arkansas (later to become part of the Cotton Belt Railroad), is incorporated.

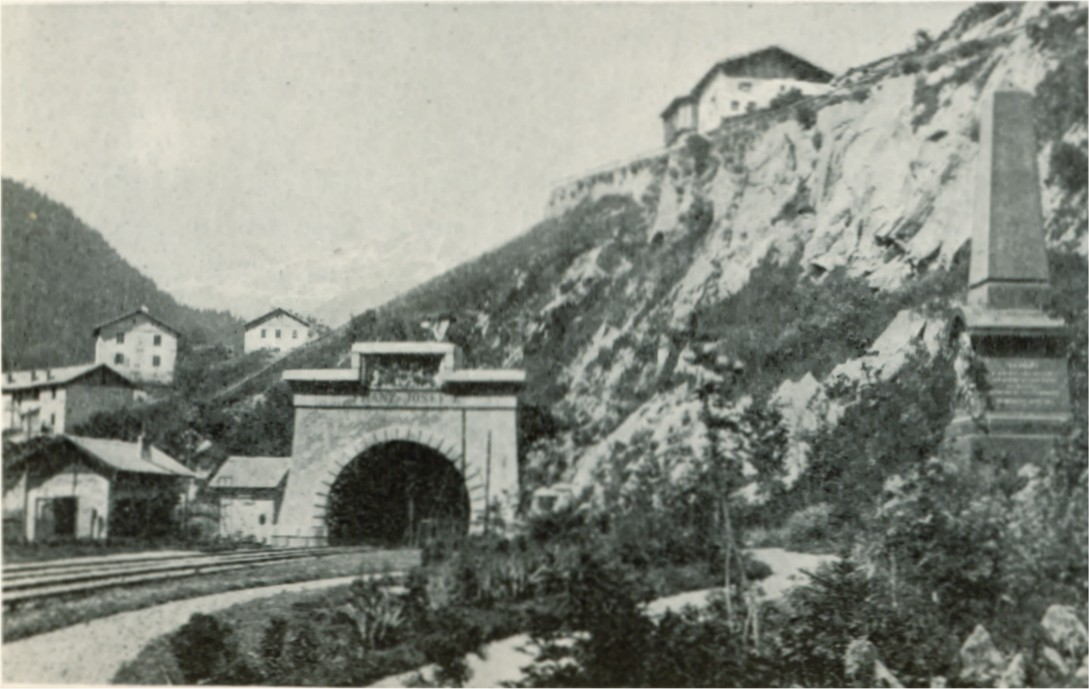
Arlberg Railway Tunnel, east end

=== July events ===
- July 23 – The Iron Railroad in Ohio is reincorporated as the Iron Railway.

=== September events ===
- September 15 – Opening of first railway in Serbia, from Belgrade to Niš (243 km (151 mi)).
- September 20 - Opening of the Arlberg Railway Tunnel (10.25 km (6.37 mi)), completing the Arlberg railway in Austria, the main east–west rail link through the Alps.

=== October events ===
- October – John King succeeds Hugh J. Jewett as president of the Erie Railroad.

=== November events ===
- November 13 – The Hagener Straßenbahn-Gesellschaft in Hagen, Germany, opens its first 2 km (1.2 mi) long horse-car line.
- November 28 – Northern Pacific Railroad establishes the town of Pasco, Washington, at the junction of its lines between Seattle, Tacoma, Spokane, and Portland, Oregon.

=== December events ===
- December 10 – Narrow gauge Franklin and Megantic Railway opens to Kingfield, Maine.

=== Unknown date events ===
- Summer - The Atlantic and Pacific Railroad, later to become part of the Atchison, Topeka and Santa Fe Railway, completes its connection between Needles and Mojave, California.
- The Santa Fe Refrigerator Despatch (SFRD) is established as a subsidiary of the Atchison, Topeka and Santa Fe Railway.
- The Smithsonian Institution acquires the John Bull from the Pennsylvania Railroad as the museum's first example of railroad technology.
- Charles Francis Adams, Jr. becomes president of the Union Pacific Railroad.

== Births ==
=== July births ===
- July 6 – Harold Stirling Vanderbilt, heir to Cornelius Vanderbilt and president of the New York Central railroad system (d. 1970).

=== September births ===
- September 11 – Robert Eastman Woodruff, president of Erie Railroad 1939–1949, is born (d. 1957).

=== December births ===
- December 9 – Ernest Lemon, Chief Mechanical Engineer (1931–1932) and later Vice President for the London, Midland and Scottish Railway (d. 1954).

== Deaths ==
=== March deaths ===
- March 23 – Henry C. Lord, president of Indianapolis and Cincinnati Railroad in the 1850s, president of Atchison, Topeka and Santa Fe Railway 1868–1869, founding president of Indianapolis Belt Railroad in 1873 (b. 1824).

=== May deaths ===
- May 17 – George Muirson Totten, chief construction engineer for the Panama Railway (b. 1808).

=== September deaths ===
- September 4 – Wilhelm Engerth, German steam locomotive designer (b. 1814).
- September 26 – John W. Garrett, president of the Baltimore and Ohio Railroad 1858– (b. 1820).

=== Unknown date deaths ===
- Wendel Bollman, American designer of the Bollman Truss Railroad Bridge (b. 1814).
