= Brienz railway station =

Railway station in Brienz, Switzerland

Brienz
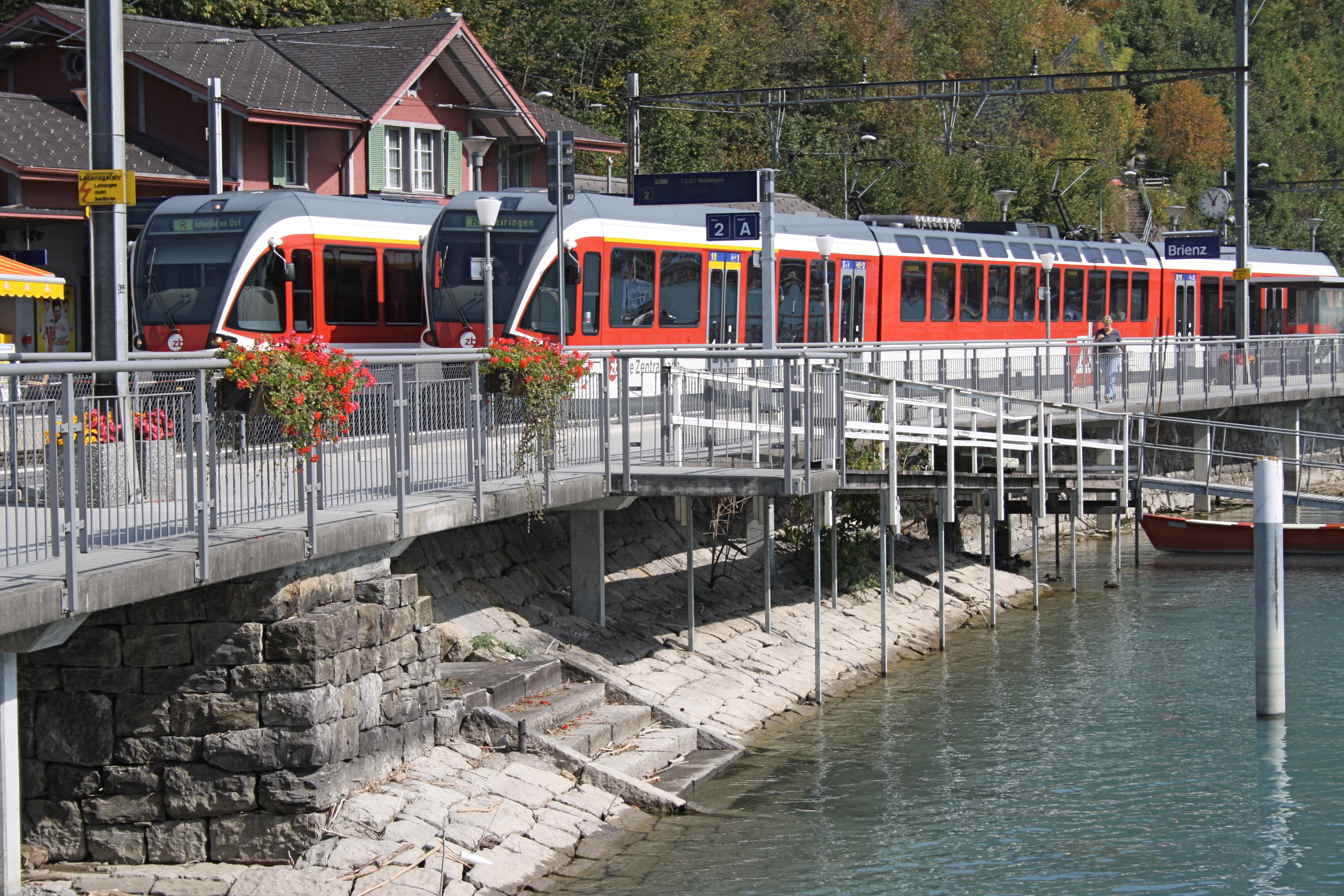
- Brünig line trains in the station

General information
- Location: Brienz; Switzerland
- Coordinates: 46°45′18″N 8°02′20″E
- Elevation: 566 m (1,857 ft)
- Owner: Zentralbahn
- Line: Brünig line
- Train operators: Zentralbahn
- Connections: PostBus Switzerland; BLS AG on the lake

History
- Opened: 1888

Services
Preceding station	Zentralbahn	Following station
Interlaken Ost Terminus	Panorama Express Luzern-Interlaken Express	Meiringen towards Lucerne
Brienz West towards Interlaken Ost	Regio	Brienzwiler towards Meiringen
Location
- Location within Switzerland Location within Canton of Bern

Brienz railway station is a railway station in the village of Brienz in the Swiss canton of Bern. Brienz is a stop on the Brünig line, owned by the Zentralbahn, that operates between Interlaken and Lucerne. It is located across the street from Brienz BRB railway station, the lower terminus of the Brienz–Rothorn rack railway (BRB) that climbs to the summit of the Brienzer Rothorn mountain.

The station provides an interchange with the local bus network provided by PostBus Switzerland. Shipping services operated by the BLS AG on Lake Brienz call at a quay adjacent to the station, linking to various lakeside places between Brienz and Interlaken. Amongst other destinations, buses link to the Ballenberg open-air museum, whilst boats link to the lower station of the Giessbach Funicular, which gives access to the Giessbach Falls.

The station was opened in 1888 by the Jura–Bern–Lucerne Railway, as the western terminus of the Brünig line, with journeys to and from Interlaken requiring passengers and goods to transfer between trains and boats on Lake Brienz. The Brienz–Rothorn line terminus opened in 1892. Brienz remained the terminus of the Brünig line until 1916, when the line was extended along the north shore of Lake Brienz to Interlaken Ost, thus eliminating the need for transfer. Brünig line trains were hauled by steam locomotives until the early 1940s, when the line was electrified. Ownership of the Brünig line section of the station was transferred to the Swiss Federal Railway in 1903, and to the Zentralbahn in 2004.

The Brünig line platforms of the station lie alongside the lake, and comprise two tracks with two flanking platforms. On the northern and inland side, the station building is situated between the platforms and the main road along the north shore of the lake. The terminus of the Brienz–Rothorn rack railway lies on the opposite side of this road, and the two railways and are not physically connected. The bus terminus is located to the west of the station building, between the Brünig line platforms and the main road, whilst the ferry pier is immediately to the south-east of the station, accessed by a level crossing.

== Services ==
The following services stop at Brienz:

- Panorama Express Luzern-Interlaken Express: hourly service between Lucerne and Interlaken Ost.
- Regio: hourly service between Meiringen and Interlaken Ost.

== Gallery ==
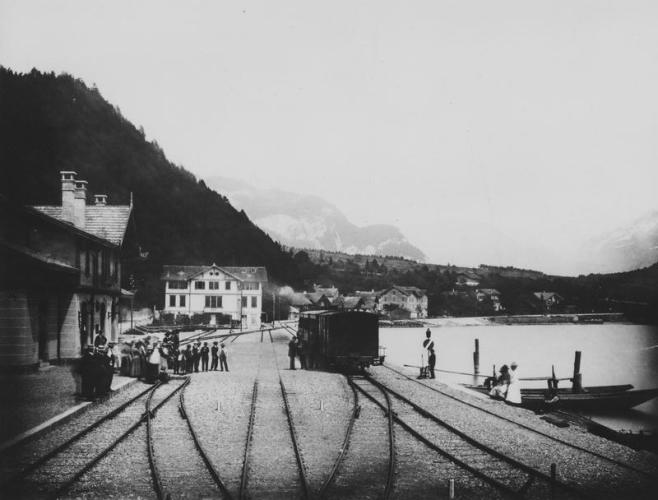
The station in 1888, when it was a terminus.

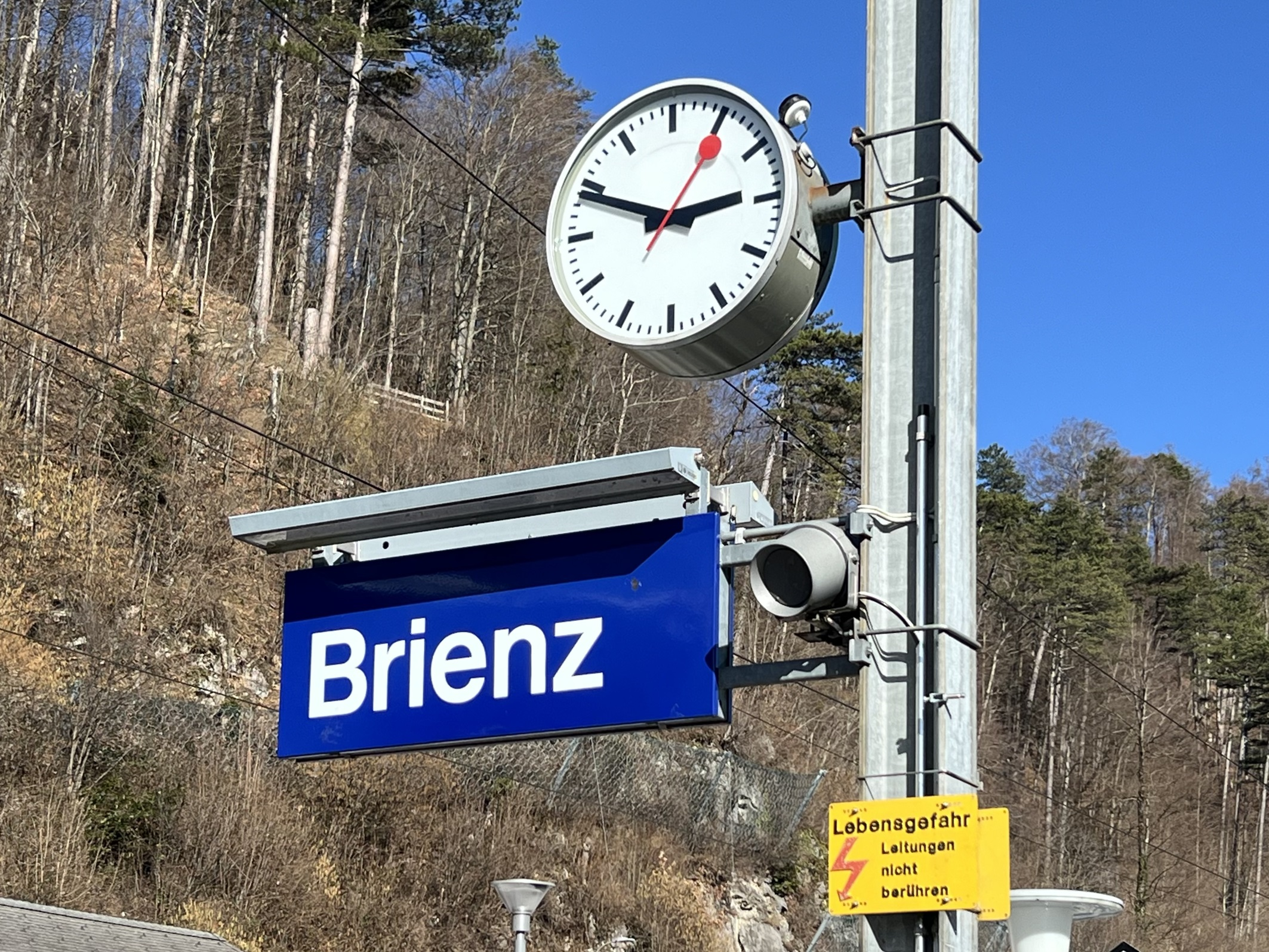
Double-sided railway station clock 2026.

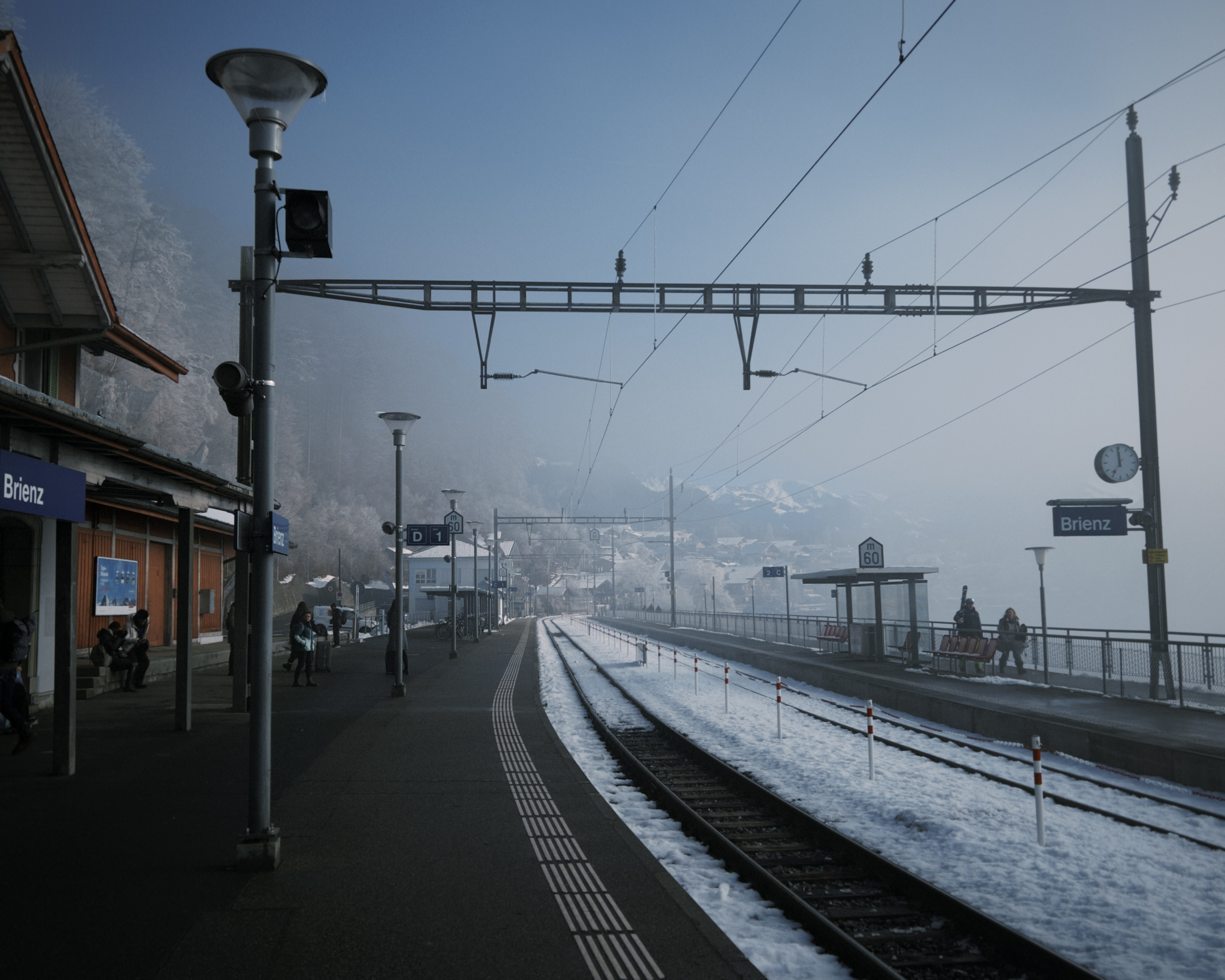
View from platform 1 towards the east 2025.

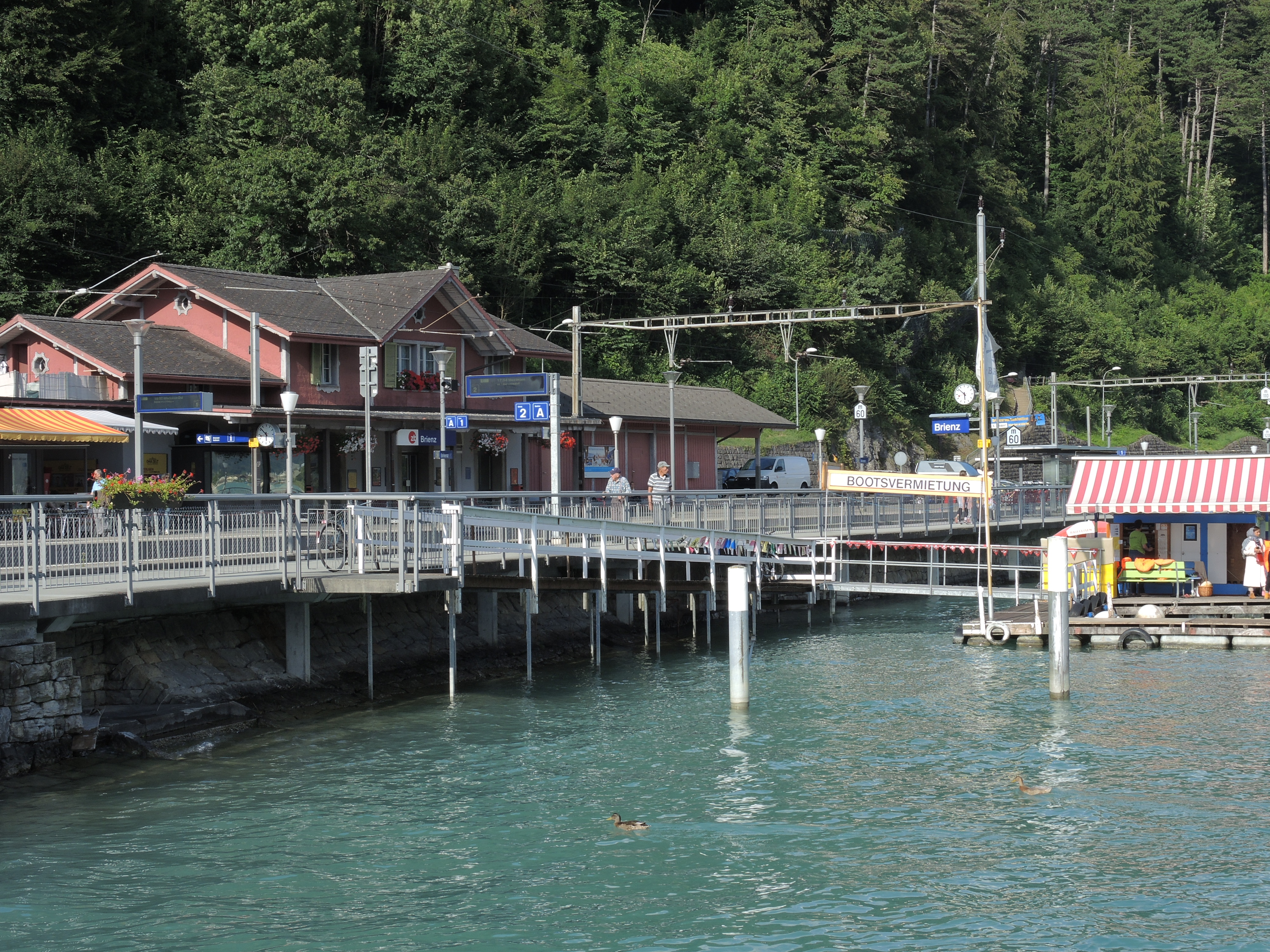
The station building seen from the ferry pier 2016.

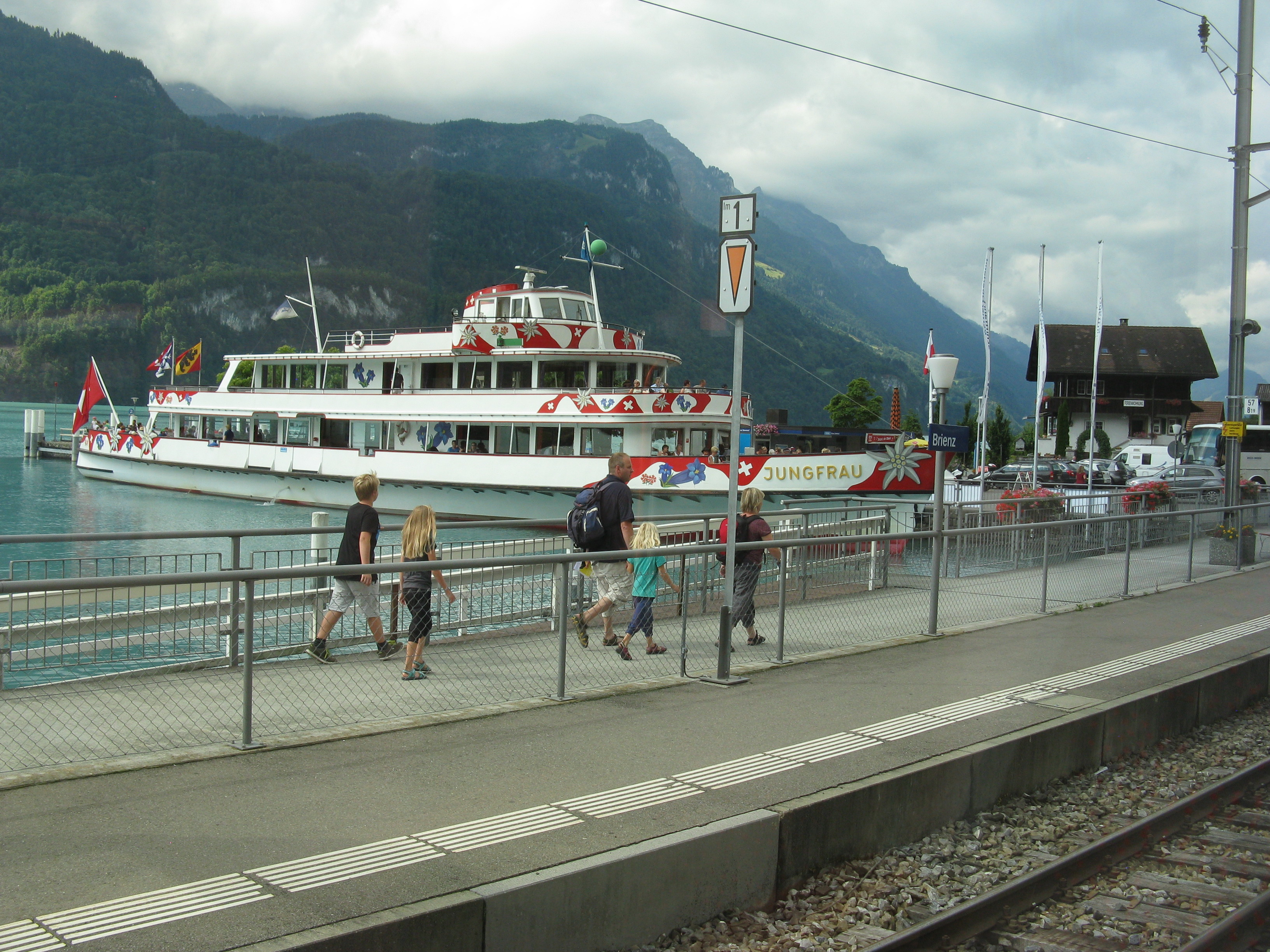
BLS passenger ship Jungfrau at the ferry pier 2015.

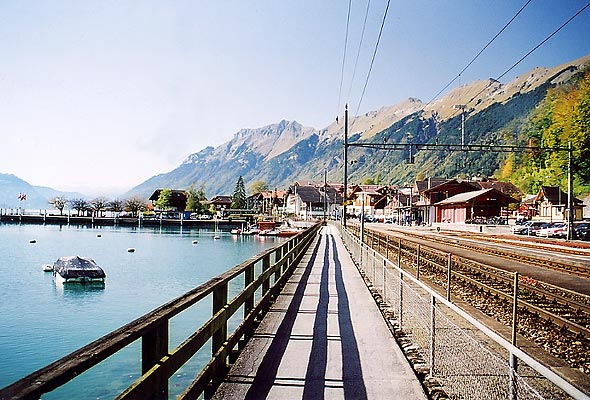
From left to right: ferry pier, Brünig line platforms, BRB terminus 2026.

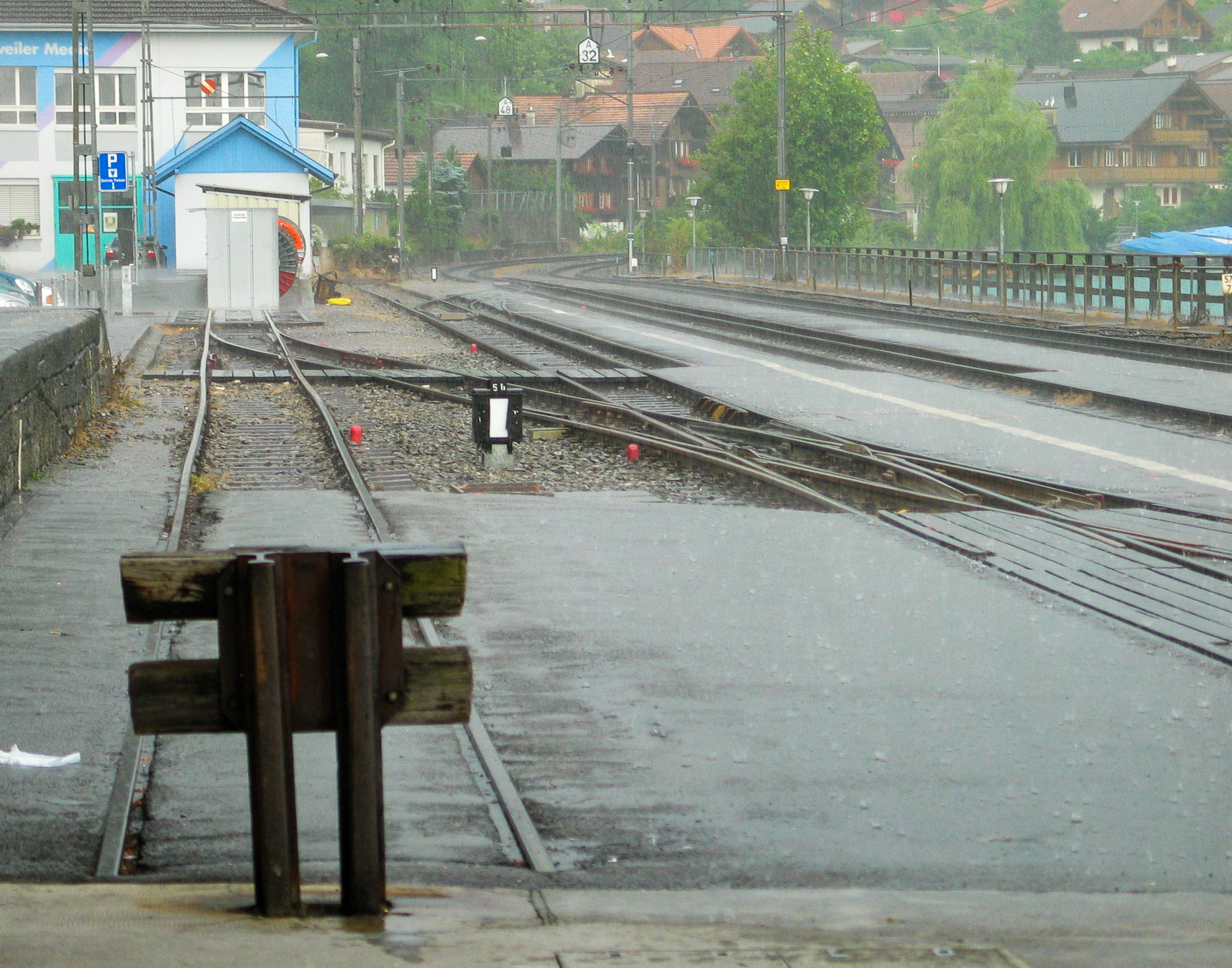
Breinz Railway Station, taken on 15 July 2003, before remodelling.

== See also ==
- Rail transport in Switzerland
