= Neussargues-Moissac =

- Commune
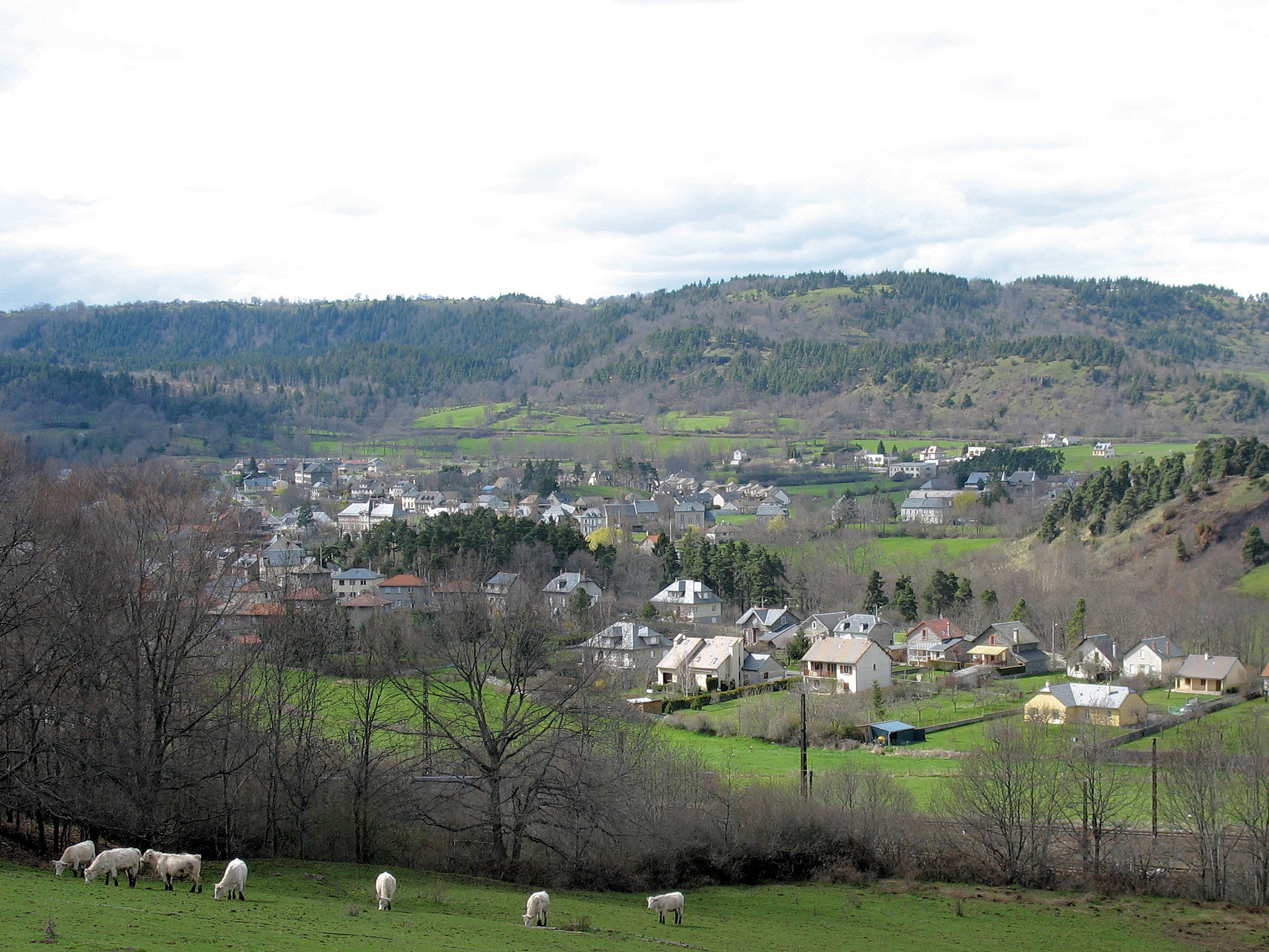
- A general view of Neussargues-Moissac
- Location of Neussargues-Moissac
- Location within France Location within Auvergne-Rhône-Alpes
- Coordinates: 45°07′45″N 2°58′37″E
- Country: France
- Region: Auvergne-Rhône-Alpes
- Department: Cantal
- Arrondissement: Saint-Flour
- Canton: Murat
- Area^{1}: 13.62 km^{2} (5.26 sq mi)
- Highest elevation: 1,022 m (3,353 ft)
- Lowest elevation: 738 m (2,421 ft)
- Population (2023): 824
  - Density: 60.5/km^{2} (157/sq mi)
- Time zone: UTC+01:00 (CET)
  - Summer (DST): UTC+02:00 (CEST)
- INSEE/Postal code: 15141 /15170
- ^{1} French Land Register data, which excludes lakes, ponds, glaciers > 1 km^{2} (0.386 sq mi or 247 acres) and river estuaries.

Neussargues-Moissac (French pronunciation: [nøsaʁɡ mwasak]; Auvergnat: Nuçargues e Moissac) is a commune in the Cantal department in south-central France. Between December 2016 and January 2025, it was part of Neussargues en Pinatelle.

== Population ==
Historical population
Year	Pop.	±% p.a.
1968	1,252	—
1975	1,213	−0.45%
1982	1,186	−0.32%
1990	1,231	+0.47%
1999	1,030	−1.96%
2007	973	−0.71%
2012	986	+0.27%
2017	955	−0.64%
2023	824	−2.43%
Source: INSEE

== Sights ==
- Château St Benoît: owned by the family of Olivier Messiaen's first wife, Claire Delbos. Messiaen worked on L'Ascension there.
- Castle Marguerite (Villa ou Château Marguerite): 19th-century building.
- The Valley of Alagnon
- Villa Marguerite: late 19th-century French mansion.

The river Alagnon is a tributary of the Allier.

== Personalities ==
- Olivier Messiaen
- Claire Delbos, violinist, first wife of the composer Olivier Messiaen.

== See also ==
- Communes of the Cantal department
