= Battle of Sörenberg =

Swiss battle

Coordinates: 46°48′23″N 8°2′44″E

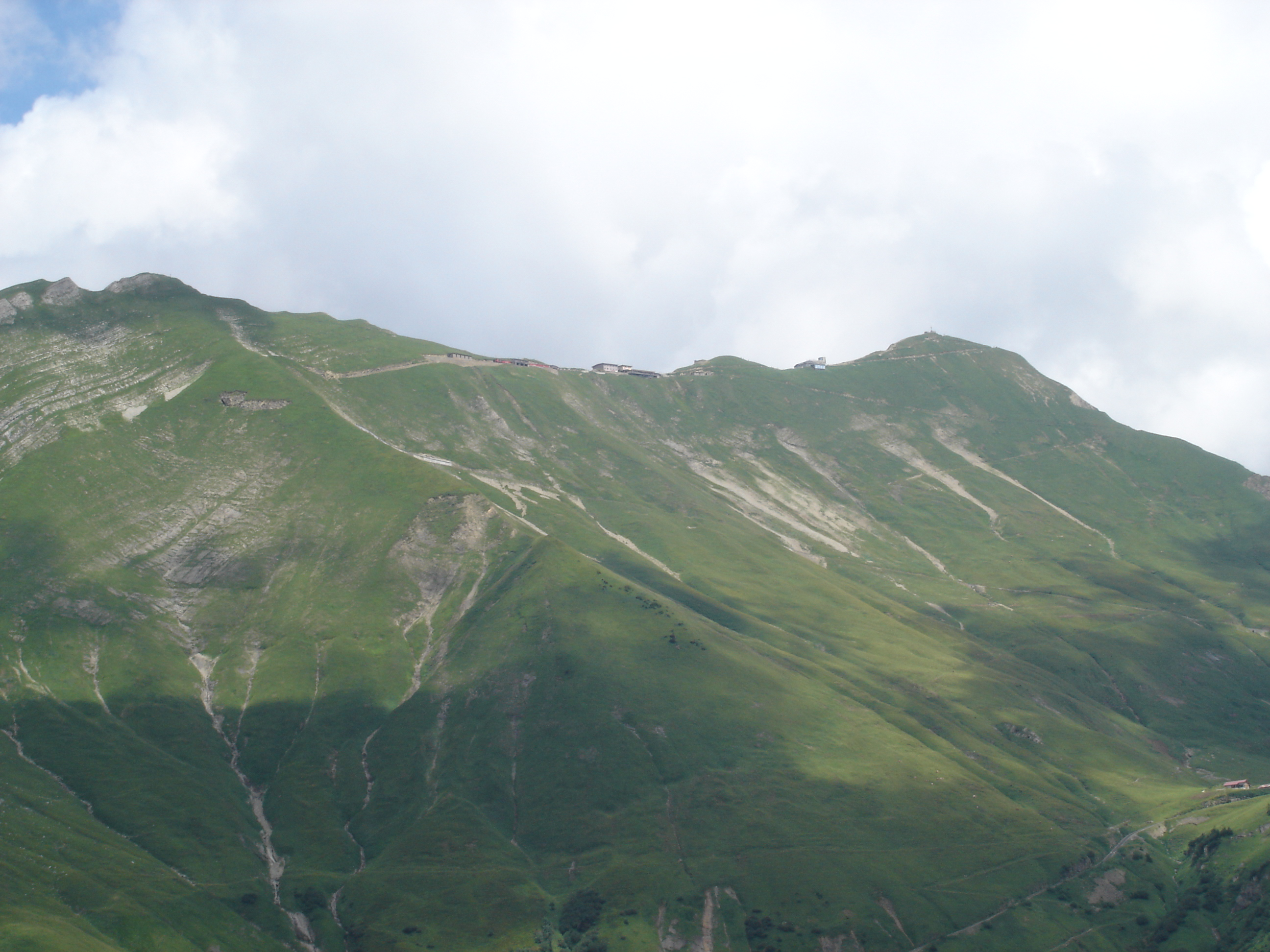
- Brienzer Rothorn photographed from the Tanngrindel
Date	1380
Location	Sörenberg

Belligerents
Obwalden	Entlebuch

The Battle of Sörenberg was fought in 1380, between the Entlebuch (at the time subject to the House of Habsburg) and Obwalden (a canton of the early Swiss Confederacy). It was the culmination of a conflict over the right to alpine pastures (alps). The immediate cause was a cattle raid at an alp now known as Schlachtalp, at the slope of the Brienzer Rothorn, above the village Sörenberg.

As recorded by Renward Cysat in c. 1600, the cattle raid took place in 1374, and the tensions between Entlebuch and Obwalden continued for several years. Finally, the two sides agreed to send a herald each to meet at the border, who would either declare war or make peace. The two heralds met and were later found to have killed each other. As the heralds did not return, both sides assumed the other had taken their herald, and mobilised for war. The two forces met at Schlachtalp. The Entlebuch side was victorious and took the Obwalden banner, which was kept until modern times in the tower at Schüpfheim. Cysat reports that the banner was lost because the banner bearer of Obwalden believing the battle was already won climbed on top of a rock, challenging any man of Entlebuch to come and take the banner. A man called Ring Rüegk (Ring Rüegg) of Entlebuch climbed the rock, killed the banner bearer and took the banner, turning the battle in favour of Entlebuch.

Later legend adds additional elements. The hero of Entlebuch now appears under the name Windtrüeb (also Wintrüeb, Wintrüb). In the cattle raid, the Obwalden invaders are said to have thrown the tenant of Schlachtalp into his cauldron of boiling rennet, killing him. They then collected the cattle and drove it away. Windtrüeb, the tenant of the neighboring Blattalp, is said to have pursued the invaders, catching up with them at Mörhalp, back in Obwalden territory beyond the Glaubenbühl Pass. The raiders were drunk from celebrating, and Wintrüeb entered the stable unnoticed and managed to steal back the cattle. The legend goes on to report a deception carried out by Windtrüeb involving cow bells, which for the 14th century is an anachronism. In the battle, the same Windtrüeb is said to have killed the Obwalden banner bearer. In this legend Windtrüeb was assassinated by the Obwalden party a few years later, in 1384, at Steinibach, halfway between Flühli and Schüpfheim.

In the aftermath of the battle, the Entlebuch sought an alliance with Lucerne, and became a subject territory of that city, and by extension part of the Swiss Confederacy, in 1385. At the Battle of Sempach in 1386, Obwalden and Entlebuch fought side by side.

A memorial stone at Steinibach (Krutacker) marked the site of Wintrüeb's assassination. The memorial stone to Windtrüeb at Steinibach remained standing into the 17th century. In the Swiss peasant war of 1653, as the peasants were uniting under Christian Schybi, the people of Flühli rallied at the stone for their battle prayer, vowing to build a chapel at the spot should they return victorious. They were defeated and killed without exception, and the stone has since been weathered away. An undated wooden plaque exhibited at Schlachtalp has an inscription mentioning the discovery of a document (Schrift) discovered when the previous wooden building was torn down which explained the name Schlacht. A modern Wintrüeb monument was erected at the bridge of Flühli in 1980.
