= Vroni Thalmann-Bieri =

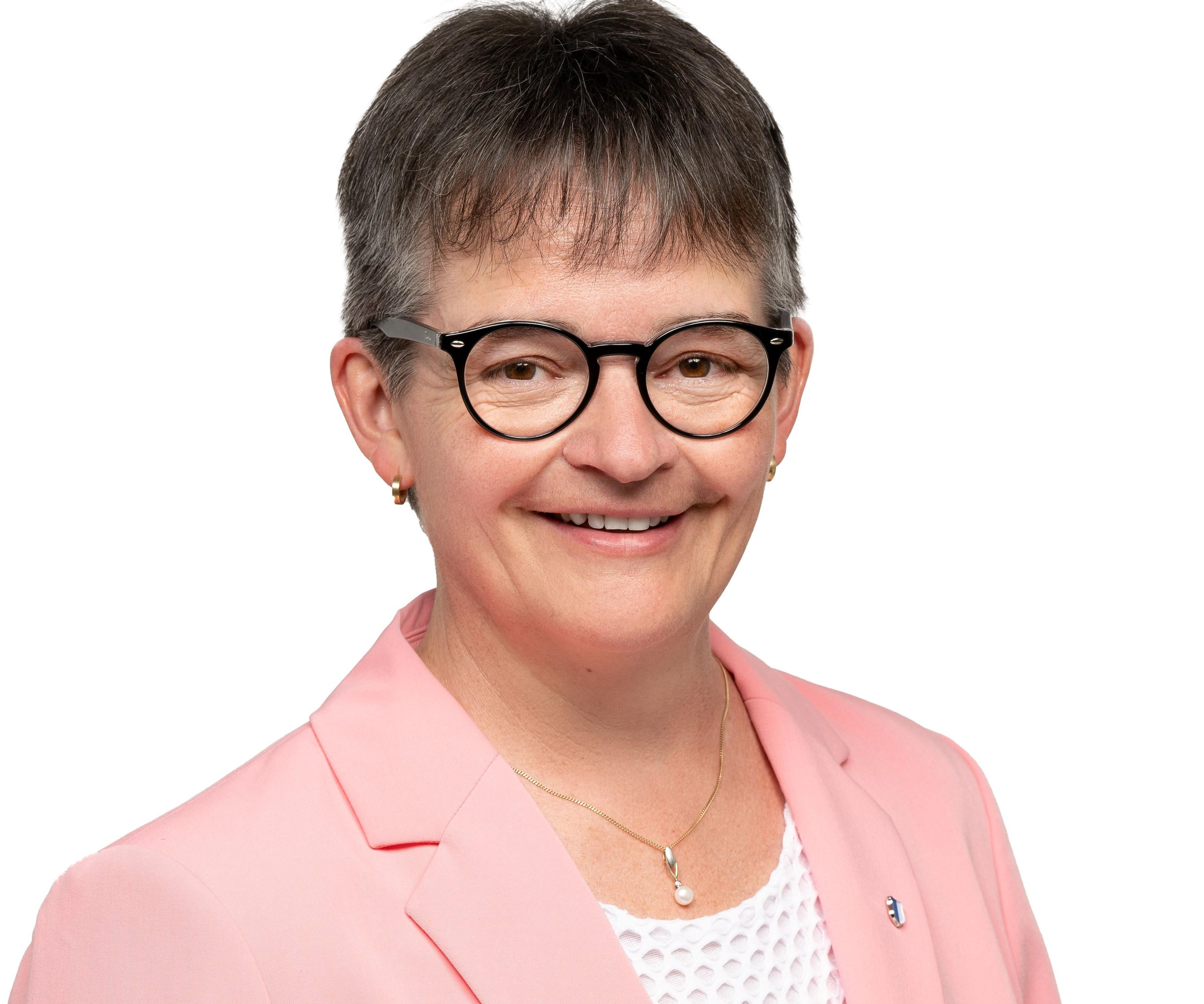
- Official portrait, 2023

Member of the National Council (Switzerland)
- Incumbent
- Assumed office 4 December 2024
- Constituency: Canton of Lucerne

Member of the Cantonal Council of Lucerne
- In office 18 June 2007 - 25 October 2023

Personal details
- Born: Verena Bieri; 28 March 1969 (age 57) Flühli, Switzerland
- Party: Swiss People's Party
- Spouse: Hans Thalmann
- Children: 3
- Occupation: Politician, micro-entrepreneur, farmer
- Website: Official website Parliament website

Vroni Thalmann-Bieri (née Bieri; born 28 March 1969) officially Verena Thalmann is a Swiss micro-entrepreneur, farmer and politician who currently serves on the National Council (Switzerland) for the Swiss People's Party since 2023. She previously served on the Cantonal Council of Lucerne from 2007 to 2023.

== Early life and education ==
Thalmann was born Verena Thalmann on 28 March 1969 in Flühli in the Entlebuch region of Lucerne, to Josef Bieri and Marlies Bieri (née Bieri; 1928–2020), into a farming family. She is the youngest of nine children and was raised on the Schaftelenmoos mountain farm. She completed a commercial apprenticeship at a local bank with an additional diploma in Information technology.

== Career ==
Thalmanns primary occupation is farming, however she is also active as micro-entrepreneur providing computer trainings and support. She is also serving as a board member of the Wohn- und Pflegeheim Schüpfheim AG (a nursing home) and the Entlebucher Spezialitäten Käserei AG (cheese making factory).

== Personal life ==
She has been married to Hans Thalmann and has three children and two grandchildren.
