= Brienz =

Place in Bern, Switzerland

- Municipality
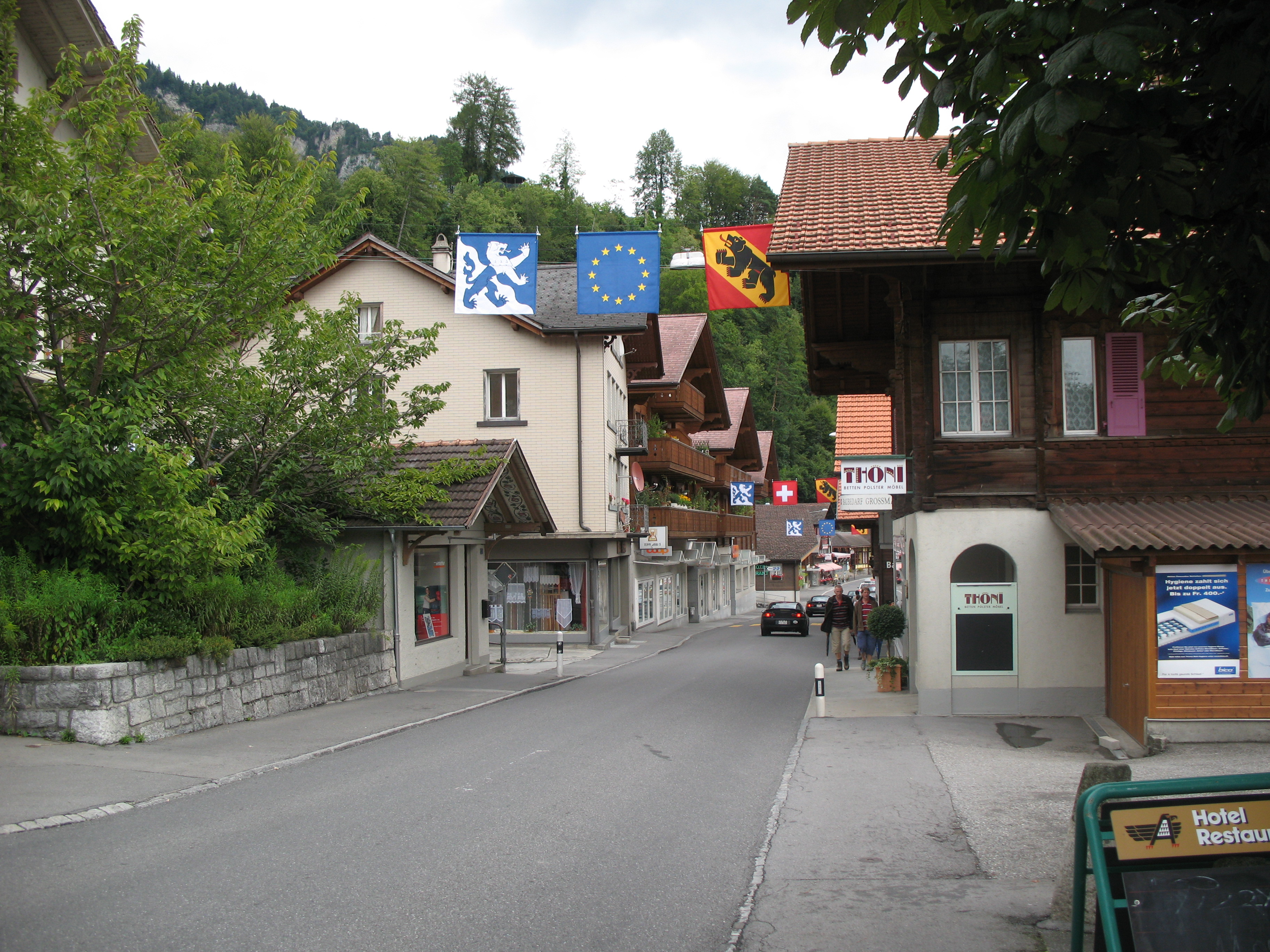

- Flag Coat of arms
- Location of Brienz
- Location within Switzerland Location within Canton of Bern
- Coordinates: 46°45′N 8°2′E
- Country: Switzerland
- Canton: Bern
- District: Interlaken-Oberhasli

Government
  - Executive: Gemeinderat with 7 members
  - Mayor: Gemeindepräsident(in); Bernhard Fuchs SVP/UDC (as of 2026)

Area
  - Total: 48.0 km^{2} (18.5 sq mi)
- Elevation (Brienz village): 566 m (1,857 ft)
- Highest elevation (Schwarzhorn): 2,928 m (9,606 ft)
- Lowest elevation (Lake Brienz shore): 564 m (1,850 ft)

Population (2018-12-31)
  - Total: 3,090
  - Density: 64.4/km^{2} (167/sq mi)
- Time zone: UTC+01:00 (CET)
  - Summer (DST): UTC+02:00 (CEST)
- Postal code: 3855
- SFOS number: 573
- ISO 3166 code: CH-BE
- Surrounded by: Brienzwiler, Flühli (LU), Grindelwald, Hofstetten bei Brienz, Iseltwald, Meiringen, Oberried am Brienzersee, Schwanden bei Brienz
- Twin towns: Brienz/Brinzauls (Switzerland), Tryavna (Bulgaria), Shimada (Japan)
- Website: www.brienz.ch

Brienz (US: /briˈɛnts/ bree-ENTS, Swiss Standard German pronunciation: [briːnts], Alemannic German pronunciation: [b̥riə̯nts]) is a village and municipality on the northern shore of Lake Brienz, at the foot of the Brienzer Rothorn mountain, and in the Bernese Oberland region of Switzerland. Besides the village of Brienz, the municipality includes the settlements of Kienholz and Axalp.

Politically, the municipality is located in the Interlaken-Oberhasli administrative district of the canton of Bern.

== History ==
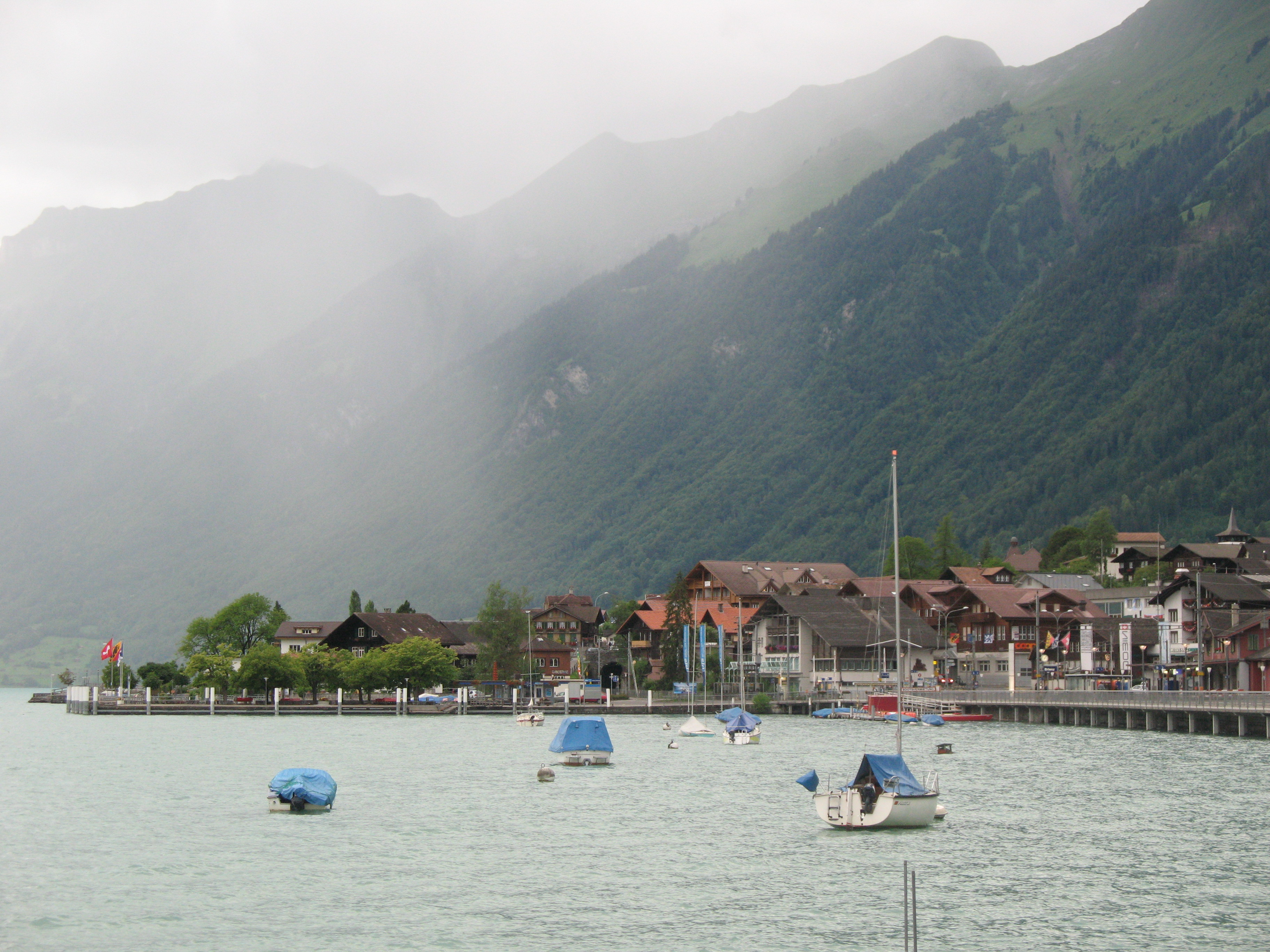
A western view of Lake Brienz in the summer, taken from the quay at Brienz

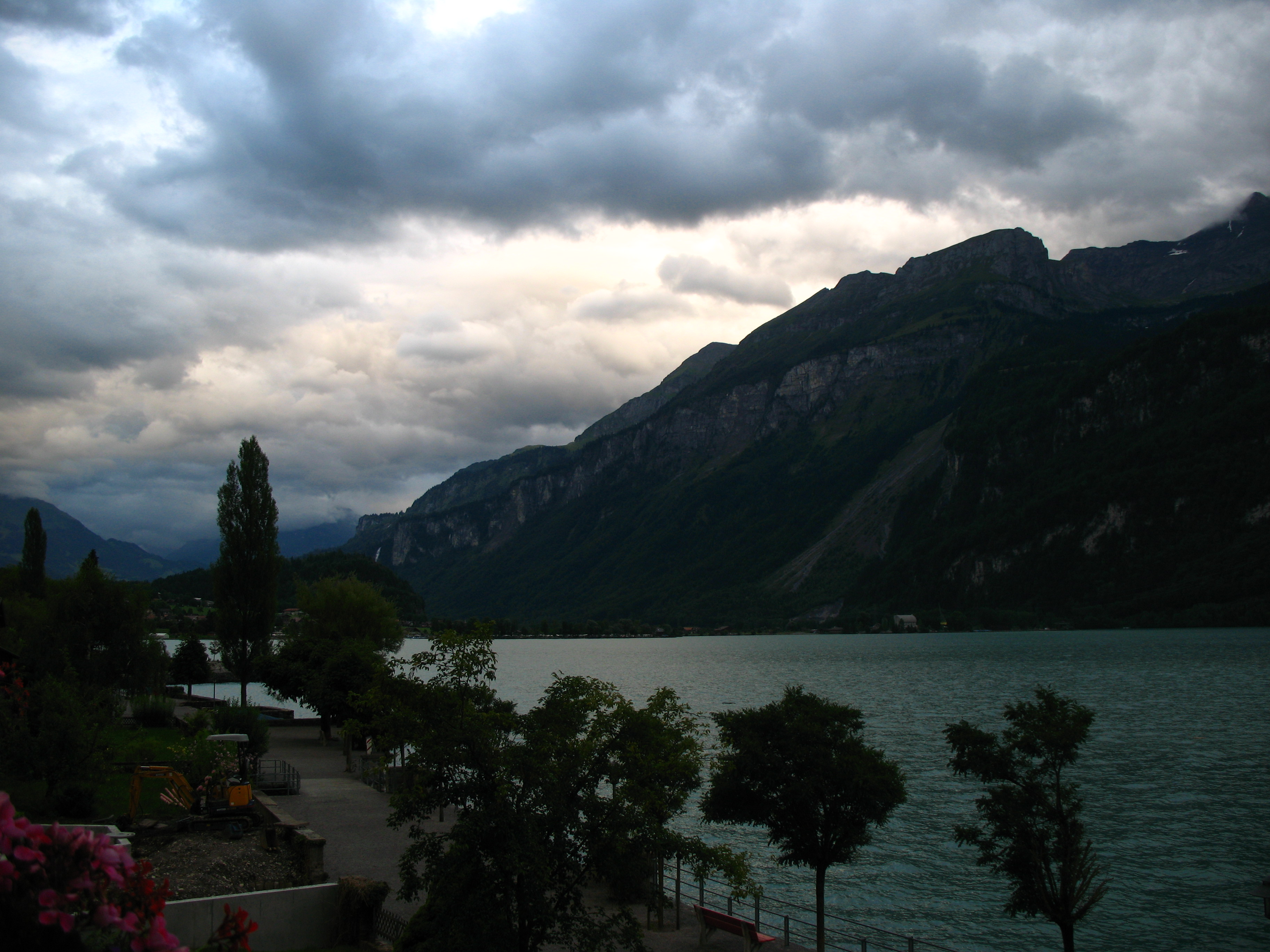
An eastern view of Lake Brienz

The first settlements date from the Neolithic and Bronze Ages. In the 5th century BC, the Celts settled in the alpine valleys among the sources of the Rhone, the Rhine and the Danube, eventually stretching from the headwaters down to Vienna and Belgrade. At the end of 1st century BC the Romans conquered this area. The Roman settlements were destroyed by the Alamanni in 259/60. They eventually settled in the area around 450. In any case, evidence has been found for a settlement by the Alamanni in the 7th century. Brienz is first mentioned in 1146 as Briens. In 1528, after an eventful history, Brienz became part of the Canton of Bern.

Lake Brienz has probably been in use as a transport route since pre-history, but the first steamship was introduced in 1839, operating a route between Interlaken and Brienz. In 1888, the metre gauge Brünig railway opened between Brienz and Alpnachstad, on Lake Lucerne. Brienz therefore became, for a while, a transfer point on a hybrid ship and rail route from Interlaken to Lucerne. By 1916 the Brünig railway had been extended to Interlaken along the north shore of the lake, and Brienz found itself simply an intermediate stop on a through rail route.

== Geography ==
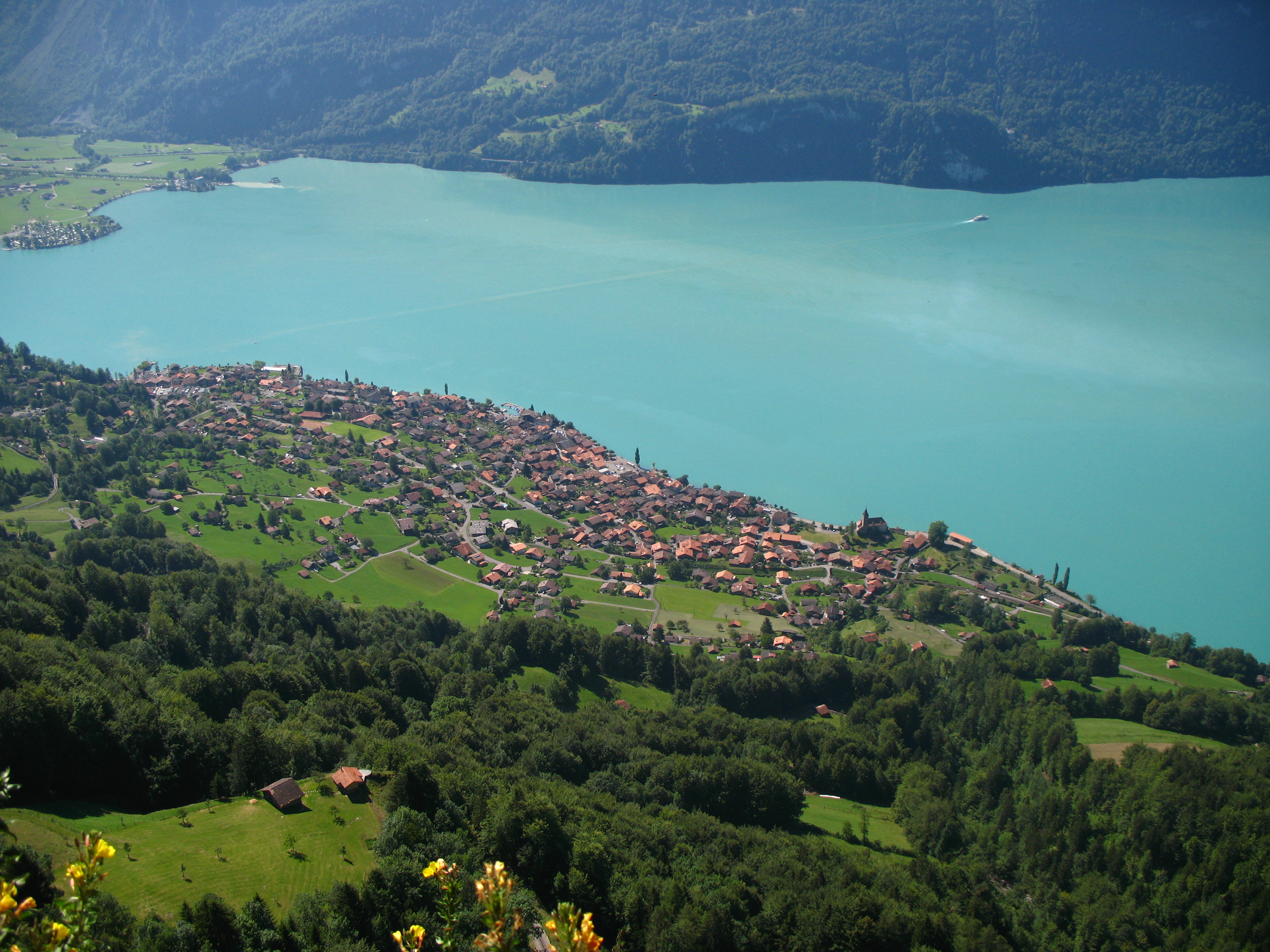
Brienz village from the Brienzer Rothorn.

Aerial view (1956)

The municipality of Brienz includes a number of communities along the upper end of Lake Brienz, and stretches into the neighboring mountains. It includes the village of Brienz on the right shore, the mouth of the Aare and the village of Kienholz to the north and the settlements of Engi and Schwendi on the left bank. Heading away from the right shore the land rises to the Rotschalp, Planalp and Giebelegg before reaching the Brienzer Rothorn (2,351 m (7,713 ft)). Heading away from the left shore it rises over the Brienzerberg and Giessbach Falls, Tschingelfeld, Hinterburg and Axalp until it reaches the Schwarzhorn (2,928 m (9,606 ft)).

The parish of Brienz includes Oberried am Brienzersee, Schwanden bei Brienz, Hofstetten bei Brienz and Brienzwiler.

Brienz has an area of 48.06 km^{2} (18.56 sq mi). Of this area, 18.53 km^{2} (7.15 mi^{2}) or 38.6% is used for agricultural purposes, while 16.15 km^{2} (6.24 mi^{2}) or 33.7% is forested. Of the rest of the land, 2.18 km^{2} (0.84 mi^{2}) or 4.5% is settled (buildings or roads), 0.52 km^{2} (0.20 mi^{2}) or 1.1% is either rivers or lakes and 10.64 km^{2} (4.11 mi^{2}) or 22.2% is unproductive land.

Of the built up area, housing and buildings made up 2.2% and transportation infrastructure made up 1.6%. Out of the forested land, 29.9% of the total land area is heavily forested and 2.7% is covered with orchards or small clusters of trees. Of the agricultural land, 7.2% is pastures and 30.5% is used for alpine pastures. Of the water in the municipality, 0.3% is in lakes and 0.8% is in rivers and streams. Of the unproductive areas, 8.6% is unproductive vegetation and 13.3% is too rocky for vegetation.

On 31 December 2009 Amtsbezirk Interlaken, the municipality's former district, was dissolved. On the following day, 1 January 2010, it joined the newly created Verwaltungskreis Interlaken-Oberhasli.

== Coat of arms ==
The blazon of the municipal coat of arms is Per bend sinister wavy Azure and Argent overall a Lion rampant counterchanged langued and vilene Gules.

== Demographics ==
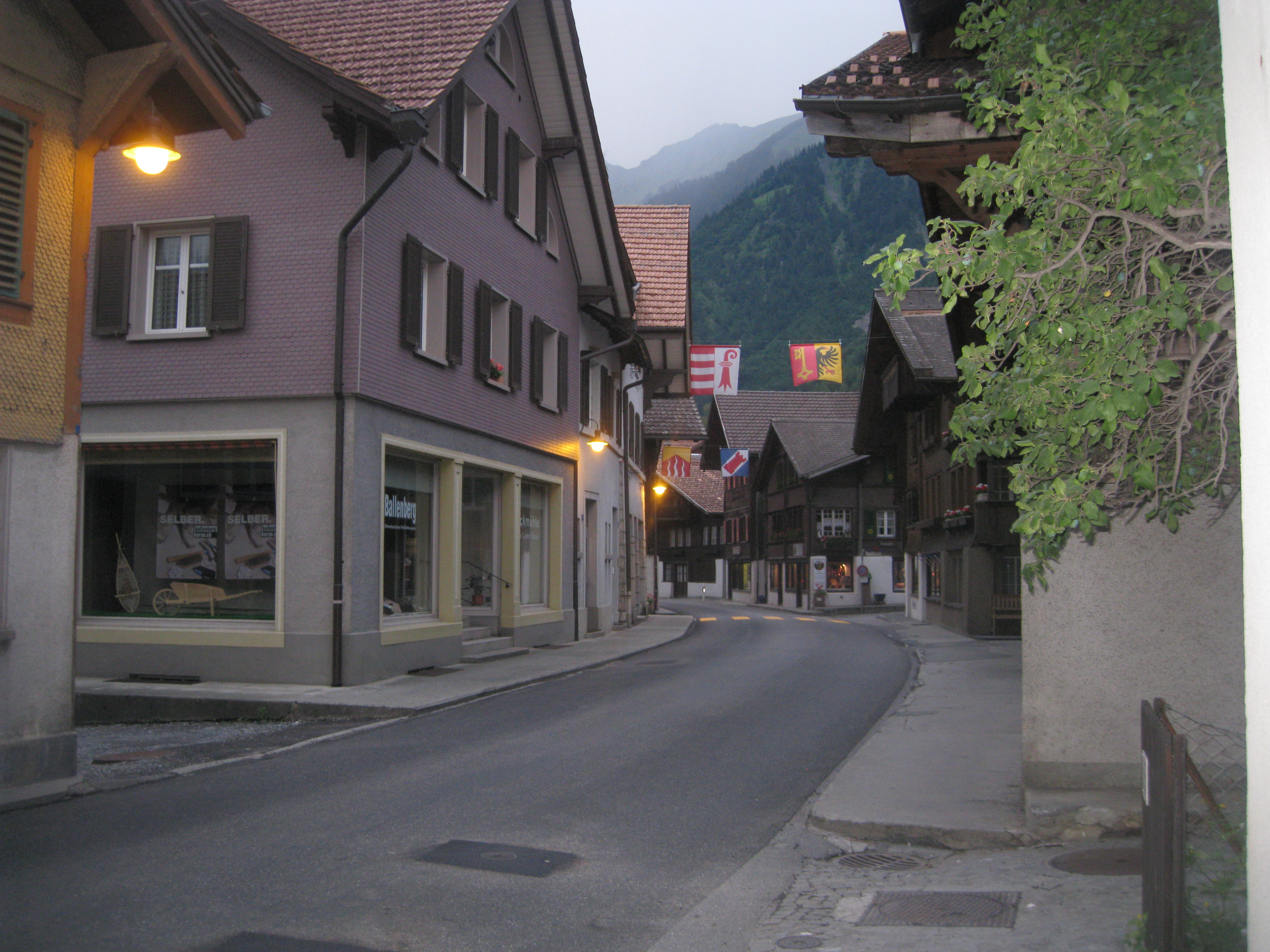
A street in Brienz village

Brienz has a population (as of December 2020) of 3,158. As of 2010, 8.8% of the population are resident foreign nationals. Over the last 10 years (2000-2010) the population has changed at a rate of 1.5%. Migration accounted for 2.2%, while births and deaths accounted for -1.6%.

Most of the population (as of 2000) speaks German (2,746 or 92.9%) as their first language, French is the second most common (38 or 1.3%) and Albanian is the third (38 or 1.3%). There are 19 people who speak Italian and 2 people who speak Romansh.

As of 2008, the population was 49.0% male and 51.0% female. The population was made up of 1,333 Swiss men (44.7% of the population) and 129 (4.3%) non-Swiss men. There were 1,385 Swiss women (46.5%) and 134 (4.5%) non-Swiss women. Of the population in the municipality, 1,298 or about 43.9% were born in Brienz and lived there in 2000. There were 759 or 25.7% who were born in the same canton, while 461 or 15.6% were born somewhere else in Switzerland, and 340 or 11.5% were born outside of Switzerland.

As of 2010, children and teenagers (0–19 years old) make up 21.1% of the population, while adults (20–64 years old) make up 57.3% and seniors (over 64 years old) make up 21.6%.

As of 2000, there were 1,169 people who were single and never married in the municipality. There were 1,457 married individuals, 203 widows or widowers and 127 individuals who are divorced.

As of 2000, there were 444 households that consist of only one person and 93 households with five or more people. In 2000, a total of 1,226 apartments (65.4% of the total) were permanently occupied, while 516 apartments (27.5%) were seasonally occupied and 134 apartments (7.1%) were empty. As of 2010, the construction rate of new housing units was 1.3 new units per 1000 residents. The vacancy rate for the municipality, in 2011, was 0.7%.

The historical population is given in the following chart:

== Points of interest ==
- During World War I a lake promenade was built along the village and the lake shore. It is highlighted by flower beds, tree plantings, and offers views unencumbered by traffic.
- Ride the Brienz Rothorn Bahn, a steam train up the Brienzer Rothorn.
- The Ballenberg open-air museum of nearly 100 original century-old buildings from all over Switzerland
- wood carvings
- Giessbach Falls with the Giessbachbahn, the oldest funicular in Europe

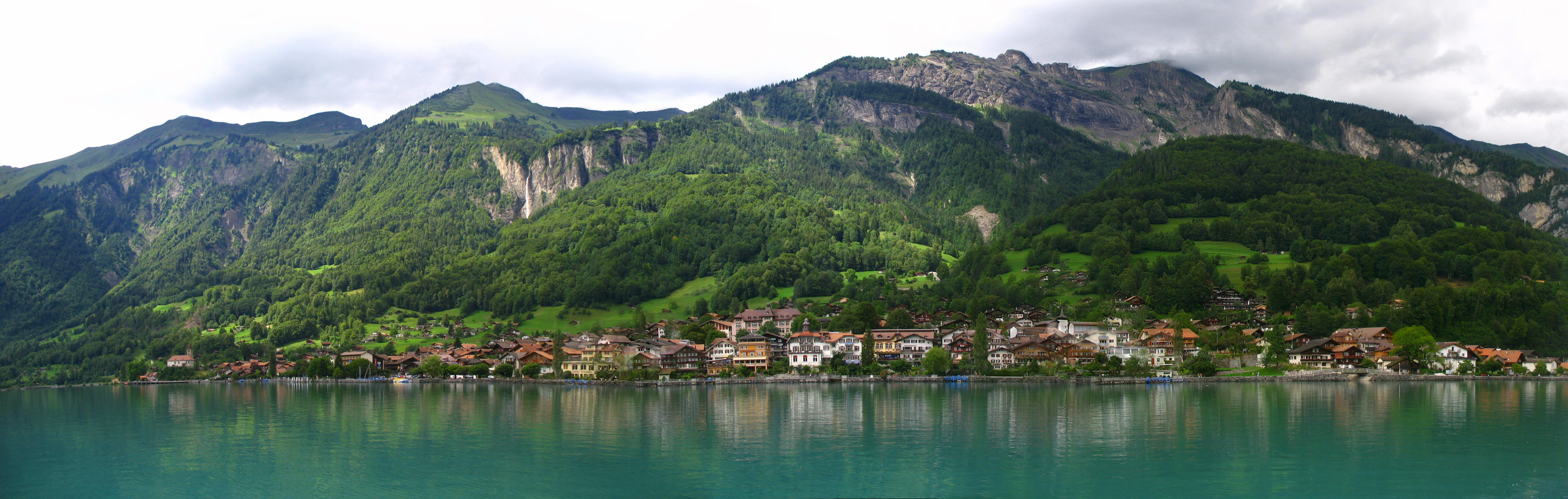
A view of Brienz from Lake Brienz

=== Heritage sites of national significance ===
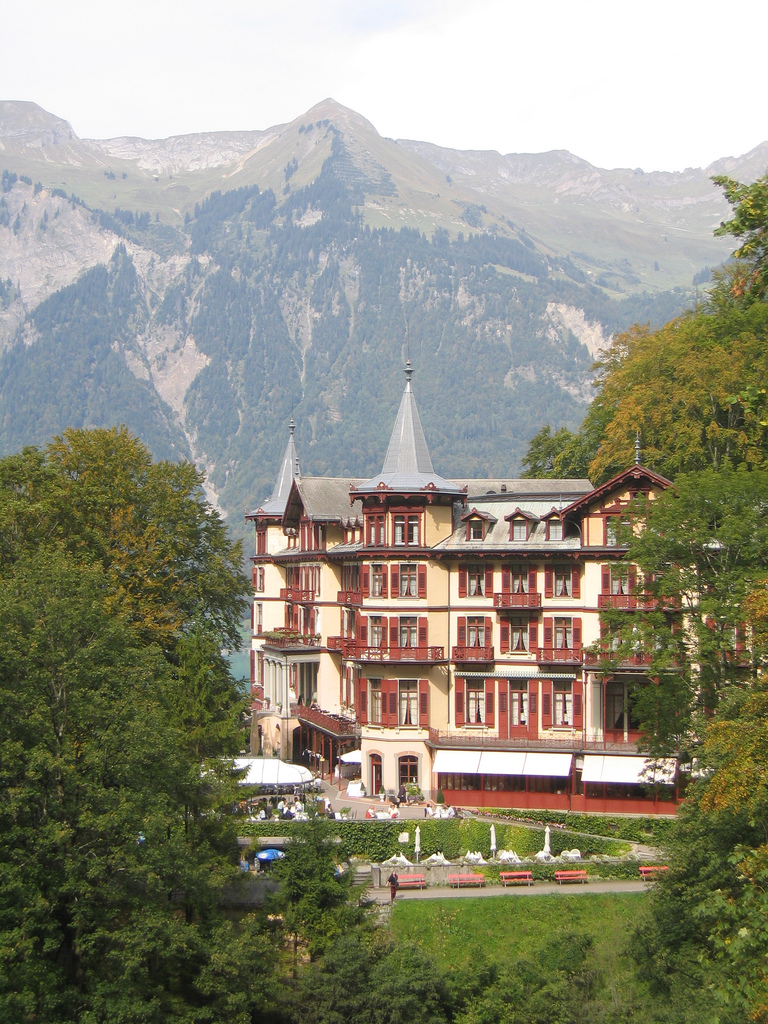
Giessbach Hotel

The abandoned medieval and early modern alpine village of Axalp and the Giessbach Hotel Complex are listed as Swiss heritage site of national significance. The urbanized village of Brienz and the Hotel Giessbach are both part of the Inventory of Swiss Heritage Sites. The latter were used as filming location for the 2001 TV series Band of Brothers.

== Politics ==
In the 2011 federal election the most popular party was the Swiss People's Party (SVP) which received 30.7% of the vote. The next three most popular parties were the Conservative Democratic Party (BDP) (16.8%), the Social Democratic Party (SP) (12.9%) and the FDP.The Liberals (12.3%). In the federal election, a total of 1,153 votes were cast, and the voter turnout was 50.7%.

== Economics ==
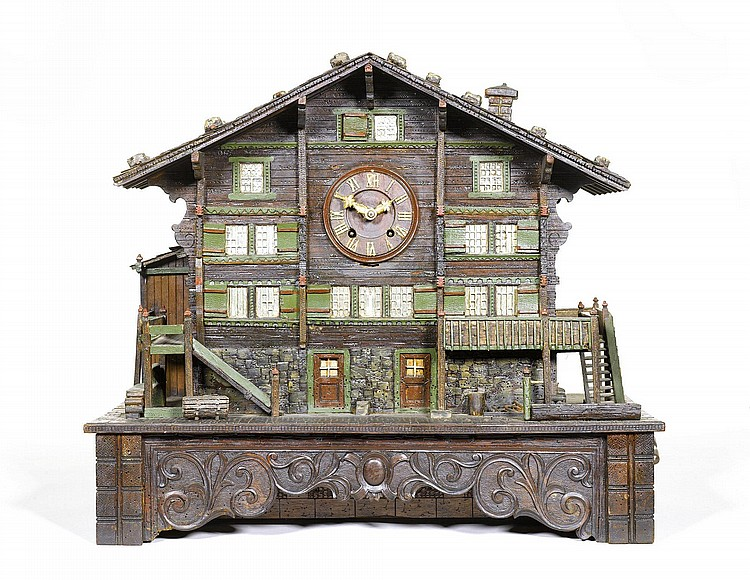
Brienz chalet mantel cuckoo clock, ca. 1900. Music box has 8 melodies.

Tourism and woodcarving are the main activities. The Cantonal Woodcarving School established in 1862 is well-known and respected in the trade.

The Swiss firm Lötscher makes the only genuine Swiss cuckoo clocks in existence today in Brienz. All of the initial steps involved in building these clocks are done in its woodworking facility in Brienz, the rest of the manufacturing process continues in Zurich where the timepieces are assembled, checked and adjusted.

As of 2011, Brienz had an unemployment rate of 1.72%. As of 2008, there were a total of 1,627 people employed in the municipality. Of these, there were 125 people employed in the primary economic sector and about 41 businesses involved in this sector. 484 people were employed in the secondary sector and there were 54 businesses in this sector. 1,018 people were employed in the tertiary sector, with 154 businesses in this sector. There were 1,500 residents of the municipality who were employed in some capacity, of which females made up 44.1% of the workforce.

In 2008 there were a total of 1,325 full-time equivalent jobs. The number of jobs in the primary sector was 78, of which 63 were in agriculture and 14 were in forestry or lumber production. The number of jobs in the secondary sector was 438 of which 199 or (45.4%) were in manufacturing, 6 or (1.4%) were in mining and 226 (51.6%) were in construction. The number of jobs in the tertiary sector was 809. In the tertiary sector; 156 or 19.3% were in wholesale or retail sales or the repair of motor vehicles, 91 or 11.2% were in the movement and storage of goods, 293 or 36.2% were in a hotel or restaurant, 23 or 2.8% were in the information industry, 21 or 2.6% were the insurance or financial industry, 37 or 4.6% were technical professionals or scientists, 49 or 6.1% were in education and 63 or 7.8% were in health care.

In 2000, there were 596 workers who commuted into the municipality and 509 workers who commuted away. The municipality is a net importer of workers, with about 1.2 workers entering the municipality for every one leaving. Of the working population, 11.2% used public transportation to get to work, and 45.9% used a private car.

== Religion ==
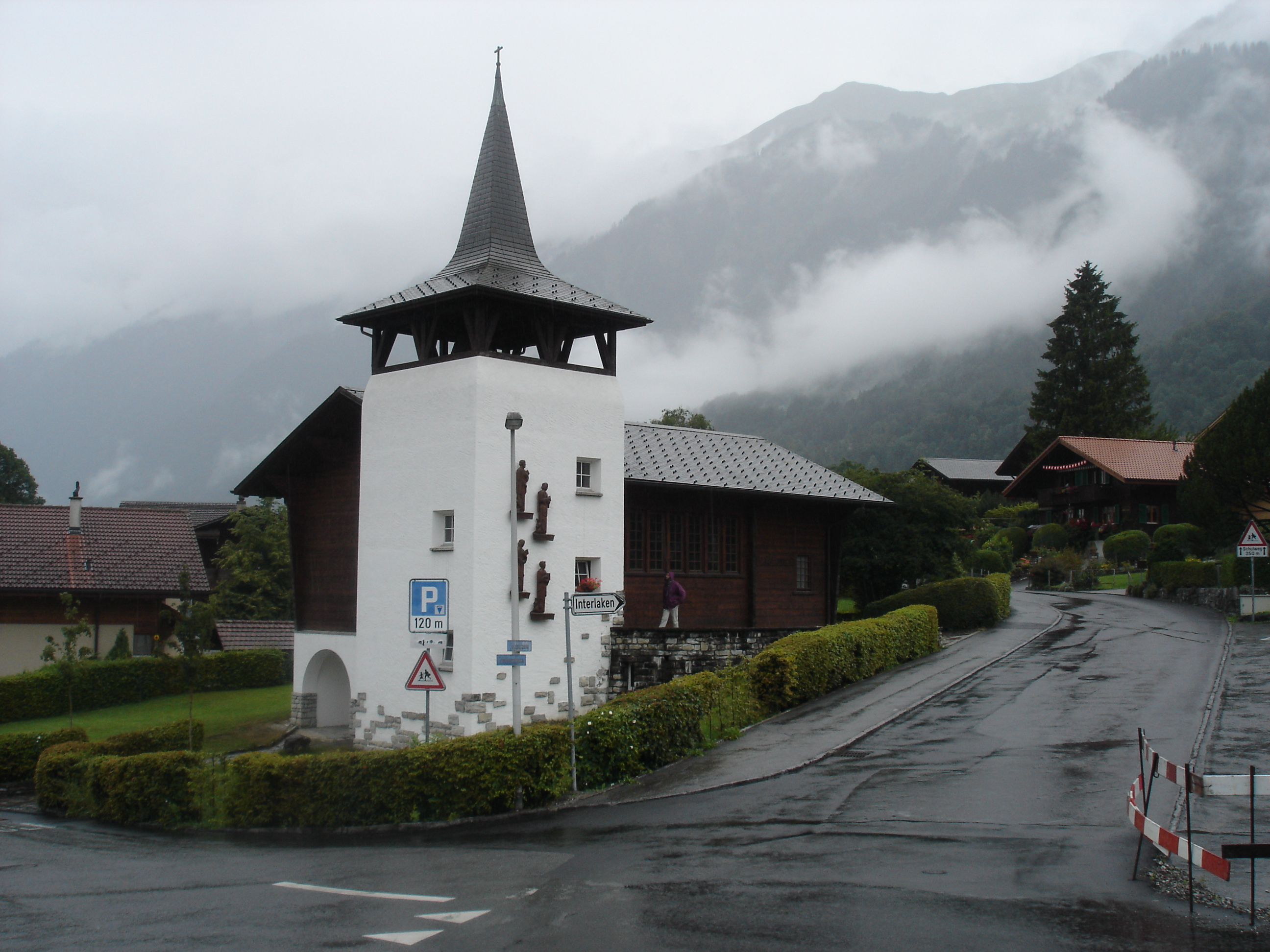
Catholic church in Brienz

From the 2000 census, 425 or 14.4% were Roman Catholic, while 2,000 or 67.7% belonged to the Swiss Reformed Church. Of the rest of the population, there were 32 members of an Orthodox church (or about 1.08% of the population), there were 3 individuals (or about 0.10% of the population) who belonged to the Christian Catholic Church, and there were 286 individuals (or about 9.68% of the population) who belonged to another Christian church. There were 57 (or about 1.93% of the population) who were Islamic. There were 4 individuals who were Buddhist, 14 individuals who were Hindu and 10 individuals who belonged to another church. 152 (or about 5.14% of the population) belonged to no church, are agnostic or atheist, and 116 individuals (or about 3.92% of the population) did not answer the question.

== Climate ==
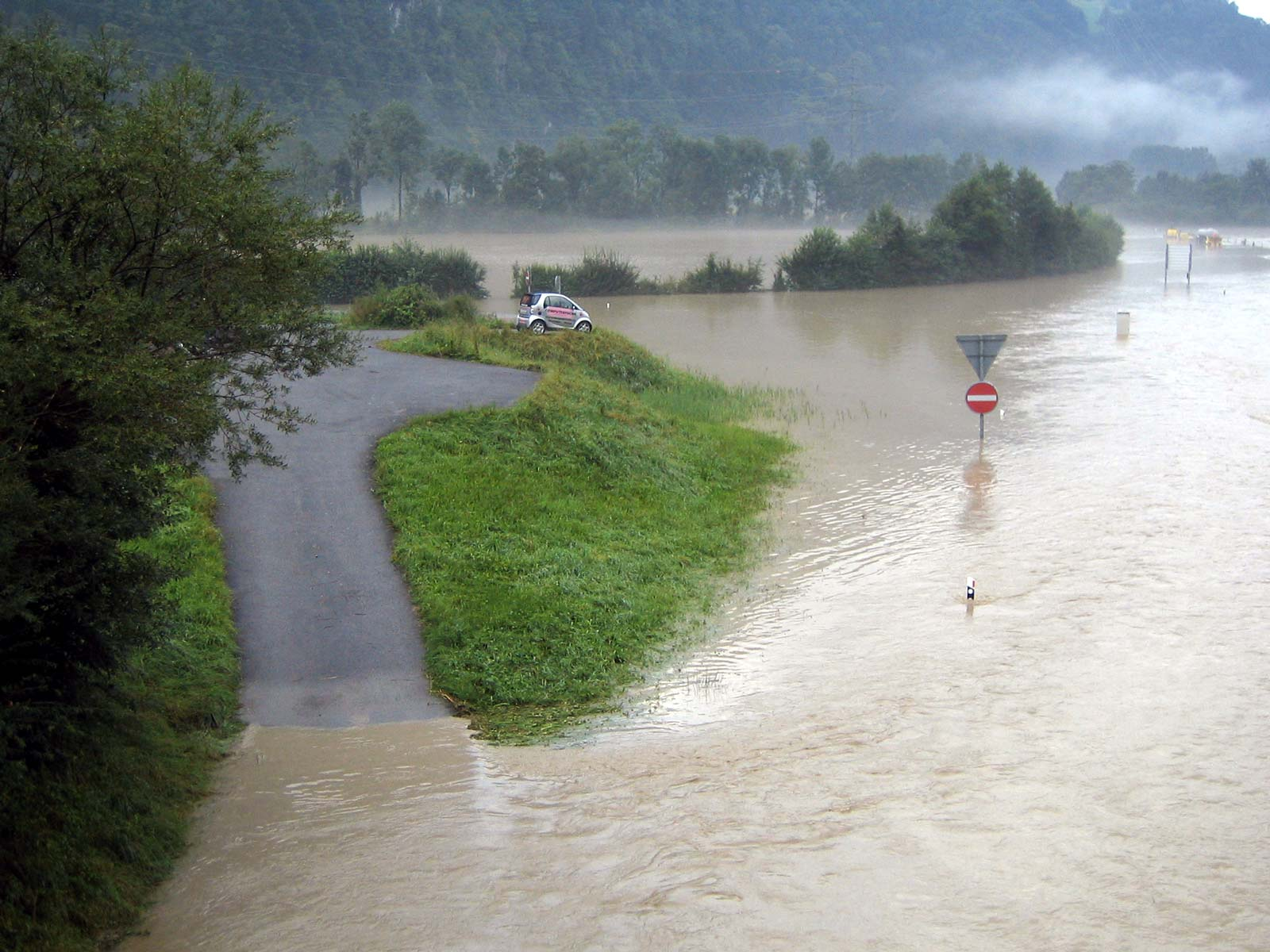
Flood in 2005 in Brienz

Between 1981 and 2010 Brienz had an average of 138.4 days of rain or snow per year and on average received 1,325 mm (52.2 in) of precipitation. The wettest month was July during which time Brienz received an average of 160 mm (6.3 in) of rain or snow. During this month there was precipitation for an average of 13.7 days. The month with the most days of precipitation was June, with an average of 14.3, but with only 144 mm (5.7 in) of rain or snow. The driest month of the year was February with an average of 82 mm (3.2 in) of precipitation over 9.4 days.

== Education ==
In Brienz about 1,264 or (42.8%) of the population have completed non-mandatory upper secondary education, and 247 or (8.4%) have completed additional higher education (either university or a Fachhochschule). Of the 247 who completed tertiary schooling, 71.3% were Swiss men, 19.0% were Swiss women, 4.9% were non-Swiss men and 4.9% were non-Swiss women.

The Canton of Bern school system provides one year of non-obligatory Kindergarten, followed by six years of Primary school. This is followed by three years of obligatory lower Secondary school where the students are separated according to ability and aptitude. Following the lower Secondary students may attend additional schooling or they may enter an apprenticeship.

During the 2010–11 school year, there were a total of 363 students attending classes in Brienz. There were 3 kindergarten classes with a total of 43 students in the municipality. Of the kindergarten students, 9.3% were permanent or temporary residents of Switzerland (not citizens) and 7.0% have a different mother language than the classroom language. The municipality had 9 primary classes and 177 students. Of the primary students, 6.8% were permanent or temporary residents of Switzerland (not citizens) and 9.0% have a different mother language than the classroom language. During the same year, there were 8 lower secondary classes with a total of 143 students. There were 7.7% who were permanent or temporary residents of Switzerland (not citizens) and 7.0% have a different mother language than the classroom language.

As of 2000, there were 59 students in Brienz who came from another municipality, while 51 residents attended schools outside the municipality.

== Transport ==
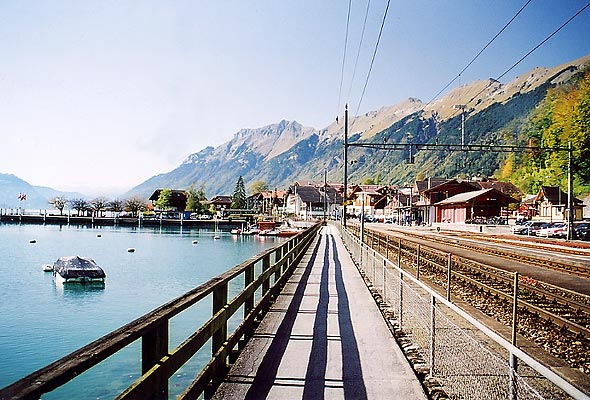
Brienz railway station (right) and steamer pier (left)

Brienz railway station is the main public transport hub in the village. The station itself is served by trains on the Brünig line of the Zentralbahn railway company. Both InterRegio and Regio trains stop, combining to provide two trains per hour to Interlaken and Meiringen, and one train per hour to Lucerne. Brienz West railway station lies to the west of the village, but within the municipality, and is served only by the hourly Regio trains between Interlaken and Meiringen.

The lower terminal station of the Brienz–Rothorn rack railway is located across the street from the main Brünig line station, and provides summer only service to the summit of Brienzer Rothorn mountain. Unusually for a Swiss railway, most trains are operated by steam locomotives.

Also in summer only, a quay adjacent to Brienz railway station is also served by BLS AG shipping services, which operate on Lake Brienz serving various points between Interlaken and Brienz. One of these stops, which is also within the Brienz municipality, is at the lower station of the Giessbach Funicular, which gives access to the Giessbach Falls.

Several PostBus Switzerland services connect Brienz village to other local places, and call at the forecourt of the main Brienz station. Amongst other destinations, buses link to the Ballenberg open-air museum.

== Twin town — sister city ==
Brienz is twinned with:

- Shimada, Shizuoka, Japan
- Tryavna, Bulgaria

== Notable people ==
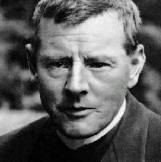
Heinrich Federer

- Elisabetha Grossmann (1795–1858), "The Fair Skipper of Brienz"
- Oswald Wirth (1860–1943) occultist, artist and author; studied esotericism and symbolism
- Heinrich Federer (1866–1928), Catholic priest and writer
- Rosa Neuenschwander (1883–1962), vocational education pioneer and feminist
- Fritz Abplanalp (1907–1977) a Swiss woodcarver.
- Anita Studer (born 1944) accountant, ornithologist, conservationist and ecologist; is saving a forest in northeastern Brazil.
- Martina Schild (born 1981) alpine downhill skier, silver medallist at the 2006 Winter Olympics.
