= Oberried am Brienzersee railway station =

Railway station in Switzerland

Oberried am Brienzersee
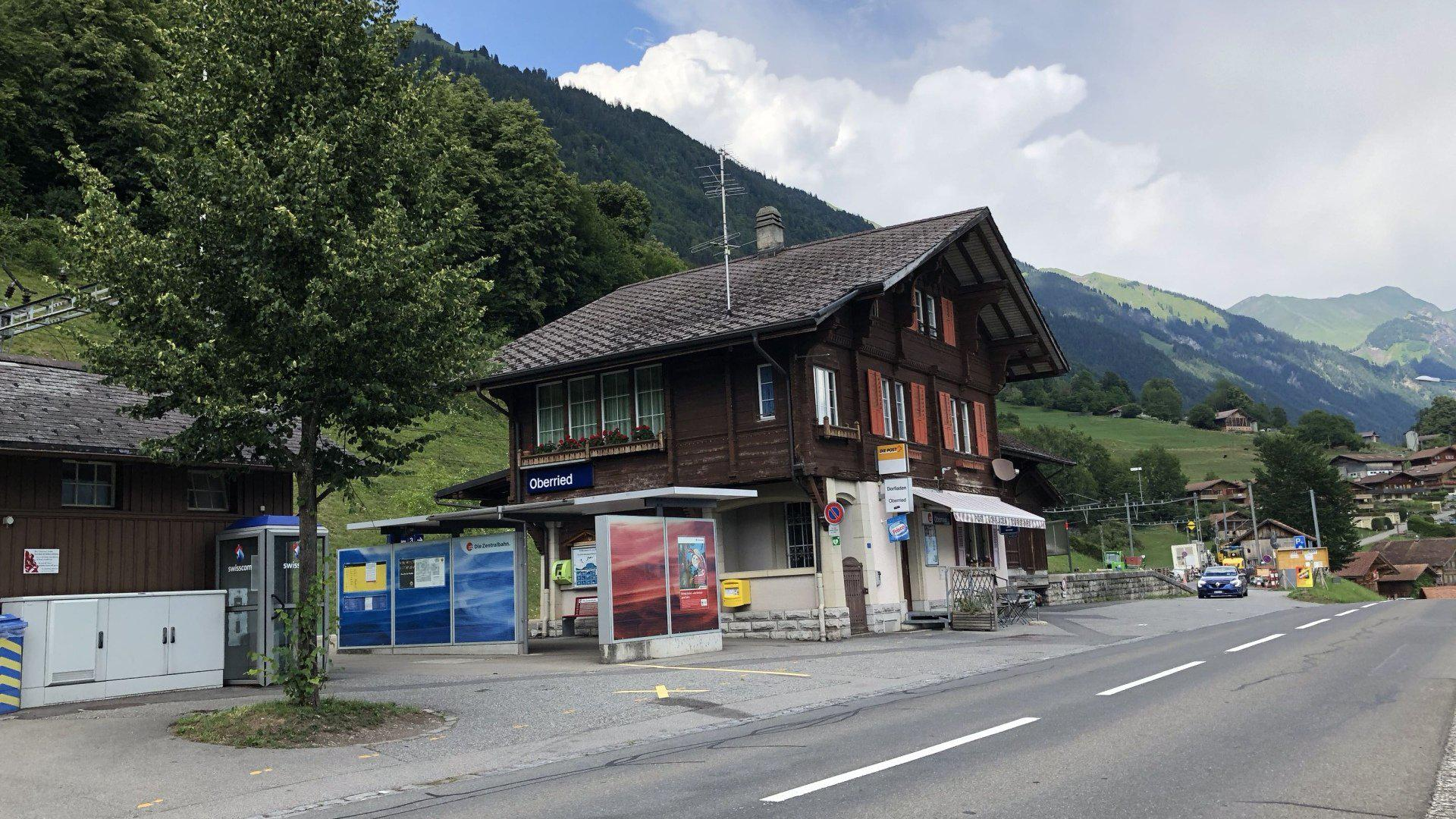
- The station building in 2018

General information
- Location: Hauptstrasse; Oberried am Brienzersee; Switzerland
- Coordinates: 46°44′12″N 7°57′32″E
- Elevation: 589 m (1,932 ft)
- Owner: Zentralbahn
- Line: Brünig line
- Train operators: Zentralbahn

Services
Preceding station	Zentralbahn	Following station
Niederried towards Interlaken Ost	Regio	Ebligen towards Meiringen
Location
- Location within Switzerland Location within Canton of Bern

Oberried am Brienzersee railway station is a Swiss railway station in the village and municipality of Oberried am Brienzersee and the canton of Bern. Oberried is a stop on the Brünig line, owned by the Zentralbahn, that operates between Interlaken and Lucerne.

== Services ==
The following services stop at Oberried am Brienzersee:

- Regio: hourly service between Interlaken Ost and Meiringen.
