= Brienz West railway station =

Railway station in Switzerland

Brienz West
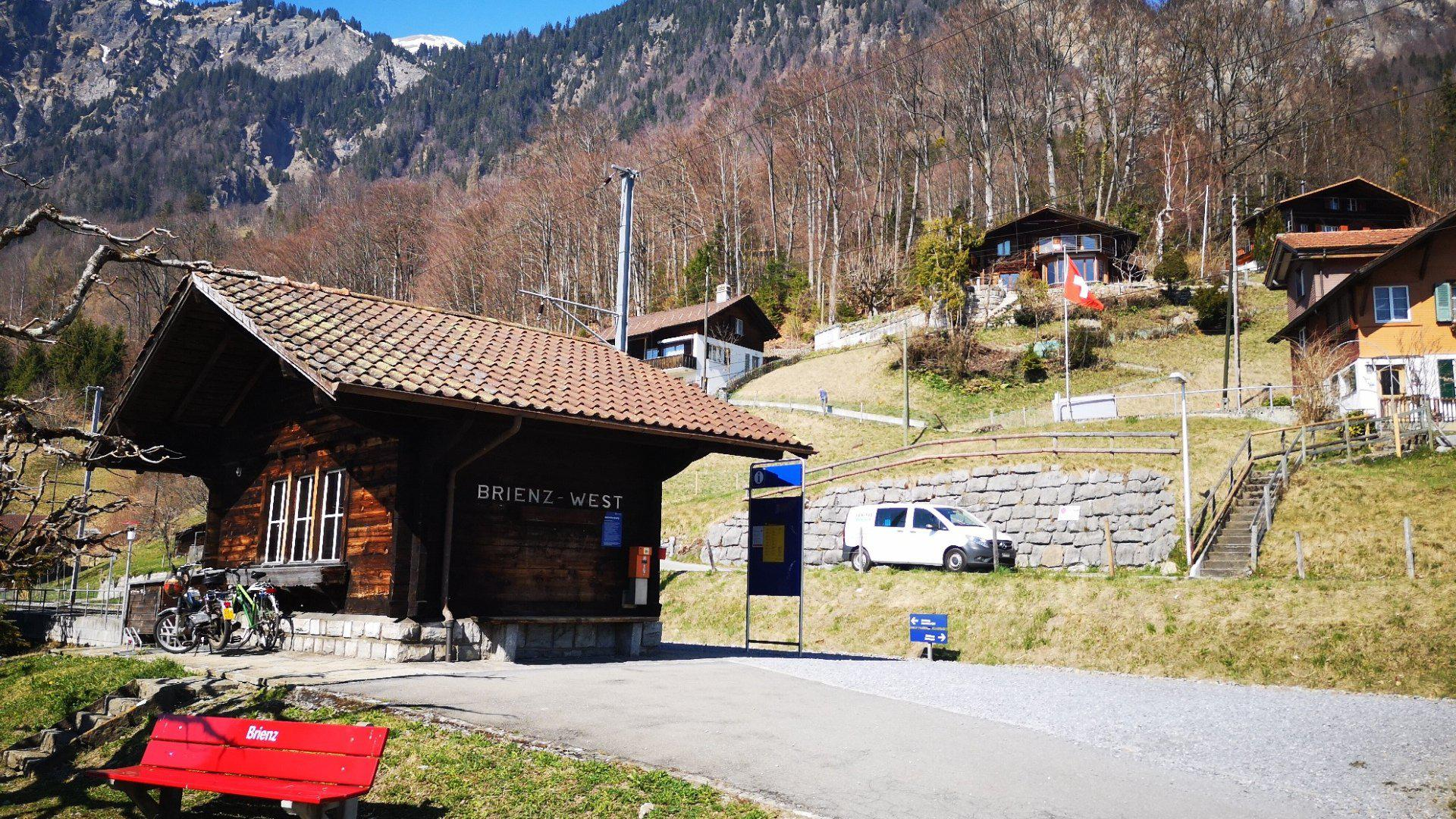
- The station in 2018

General information
- Location: Seemattenstrasse; Brienz; Switzerland
- Coordinates: 46°45′26″N 8°01′13″E
- Owner: Zentralbahn
- Line: Brünig line
- Train operators: Zentralbahn

Services
Preceding station	Zentralbahn	Following station
Ebligen towards Interlaken Ost	Regio	Brienz towards Meiringen
Location
- Location within Switzerland Location within Canton of Bern

Brienz West railway station is a Swiss railway station in the municipality of Brienz and the canton of Bern. Brienz West is a stop on the Brünig line, owned by the Zentralbahn, that operates between Interlaken and Lucerne.

== Services ==
The following services stop at Brienz West:

- Regio: hourly service between Interlaken Ost and Meiringen.
