= Fritz Abplanalp =

Swiss woodcarver

- Born: 1907
- Died: 1977 (aged 69–70)
- Occupations: woodcarver, artist

The Offering (Hawaiian Dancer) monkeypod carving by Abplanalp, c. 1941, Honolulu Museum of Art

Fritz Abplanalp (1907–1977) was a Swiss woodcarver.

== Life and career ==
Born in Brienz, Switzerland, at 18 years of age, after completing a three-year curriculum in woodcarving, he answered an advertisement to work on the interior of the Episcopalian Convent of the Transfiguration in Glendale, Ohio. He spent seven years carving the interior of the church.

In 1935, he was recruited by the elegant Honolulu branch of the renown department store S. and G. Gump and Company to come to Hawaii and produce hand-carved home furnishings and decor. With his classical European training, his carving depicted lifelike tropical leaves and flowers artfully carved onto wood surfaces, contributing to the mid-century "Hawaiian Style." Working with tropical woods such as koa, mahogany, mango, kamani, and monkeypod, he carved sculptural wooden perfume containers, highly detailed room screens, trays and bowls, table and floor lamps, and figural art sculptures including Polynesian heads for sale in the store, and also produced custom woodworking and furniture such as tables, chairs, cabinets, sideboards, and bedroom suites, for homes and commercial interiors. In 1939, he won the Grand Prize at a Honolulu Museum of Art exhibition. His art pieces and carved furniture remain highly sought after today. Abplanalp's monkeypod sculpture, The Offering (Hawaiian Dancer), is owned by the Honolulu Museum of Art.

In 1942, with the war rendering Hawaii’s tourism nonexistent, he joined the faculty of Kamehameha Schools to teach woodworking, art, and drafting. He was deeply involved in the Hawaiian communities rediscovering their wood carving tradition and preservation of older carvings. He retired from Kamehameha Schools in 1968, to Carmel, California.

In the 1960s Fritz was commissioned by St. Anthony of Padua Church in Kailua to carve a crucifix for the back of the altar in the new church. On Easter of 1968 St. Anthony's had its first Mass in the new church with a beautiful and unique crucifix, Jesus is looking towards the heavens instead of down. In 1982 there was a fire and the crucifix was burned. But it was treated and saved, hanging above the Baptismal font for 3 1/2 decades. In the summer of 2019 it was carefully returned to its original position, behind the altar.

He died in 1977.
