= Oberried am Brienzersee =

- Municipality
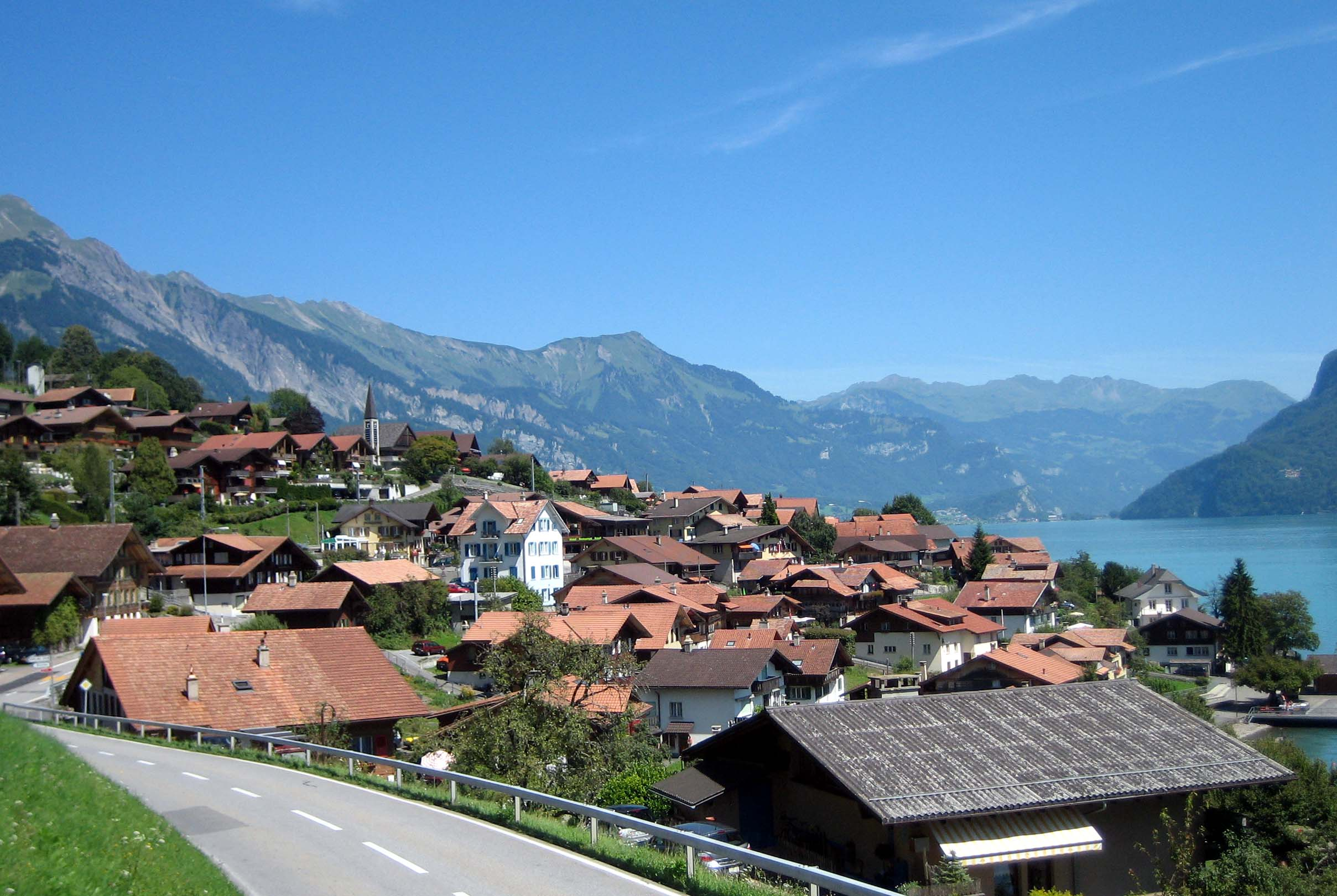

- Flag Coat of arms
- Location of Oberried am Brienzersee
- Location within Switzerland Location within Canton of Bern
- Coordinates: 46°44′N 7°57′E
- Country: Switzerland
- Canton: Bern
- District: Interlaken-Oberhasli

Government
  - Executive: Gemeinderat with 5 members
  - Mayor: Gemeindepräsident(in); Siegfried Aulbach (as of 2026)

Area
  - Total: 20.0 km^{2} (7.7 sq mi)
- Elevation: 570 m (1,870 ft)

Population (December 2020)
  - Total: 461
  - Density: 23.0/km^{2} (59.7/sq mi)
- Time zone: UTC+01:00 (CET)
  - Summer (DST): UTC+02:00 (CEST)
- Postal code: 3854
- SFOS number: 589
- ISO 3166 code: CH-BE
- Surrounded by: Flühli, Brienz, Niederried bei Interlaken and Habkern
- Website: https://www.oberried.ch/

Oberried am Brienzersee is a municipality and village in the Interlaken-Oberhasli administrative district in the canton of Bern in Switzerland. Besides Oberried itself, the municipality includes the settlements of Dörfli and Ebligen.

== History ==
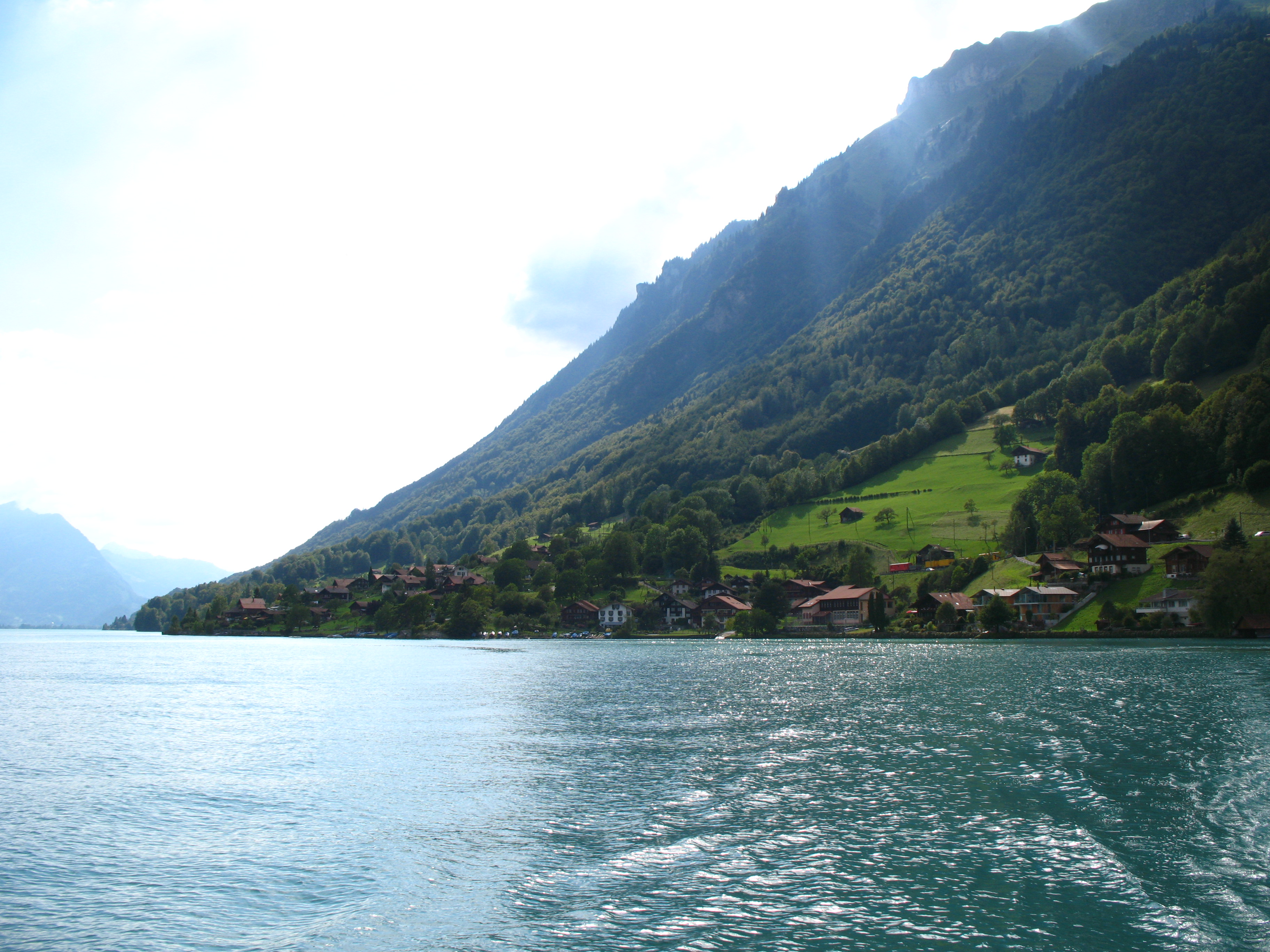
Oberried village

Aerial view (1956)

Oberried am Brienzersee is first mentioned in 1303 as Obirnriet.

The village only rarely appeared in historical records after its founding. Between 1411 and 1439 the Herrschaft of Ringgenberg, which included Oberried, was given to Interlaken Monastery. In 1528, the city of Bern adopted the new faith of the Protestant Reformation and began imposing it on the Bernese Oberland. The monastery unsuccessfully rebelled against the new faith. After Bern imposed its will on the Oberland, they secularized the monastery and annexed all the monastery lands. Oberried became a part of the Bernese bailiwick of Interlaken.

The village belongs to the parish of Brienz, but a village church was built in 1967.

Traditionally, the local economy was based on fishing in the lake, farming the small alluvial fan of the Hirscherenbach river and seasonal alpine herding and farming. During the 19th century, many residents left the village for jobs in nearby cities. A road was built along the lake shore in 1864 which connected the village with the neighboring towns. During the 19th century some tourists visited the village and in 1877 a pier was built for the tourist steam ships. In 1916 the last leg of the Brünig railway line was completed, which passed through the narrow village.

Hans Hamberger built a fireworks factory in Oberried in 1863. In 1959, an explosion in the factory cost the lives of ten workers. Since this tragic accident, only small, separated buildings have been built.

== Origin of the name ==
The name means "higher Ried on Lake Brienz." In this and several other place names, the word Ried can be given two meanings: as Old High German riod, reoth ("clearing") or Swiss German ("land growing reeds and swampgrass"). The first historical mention of the site with this meaning, from 1364, used the phrase "die von Obriede" ("those from the Ried area").

== Geography ==
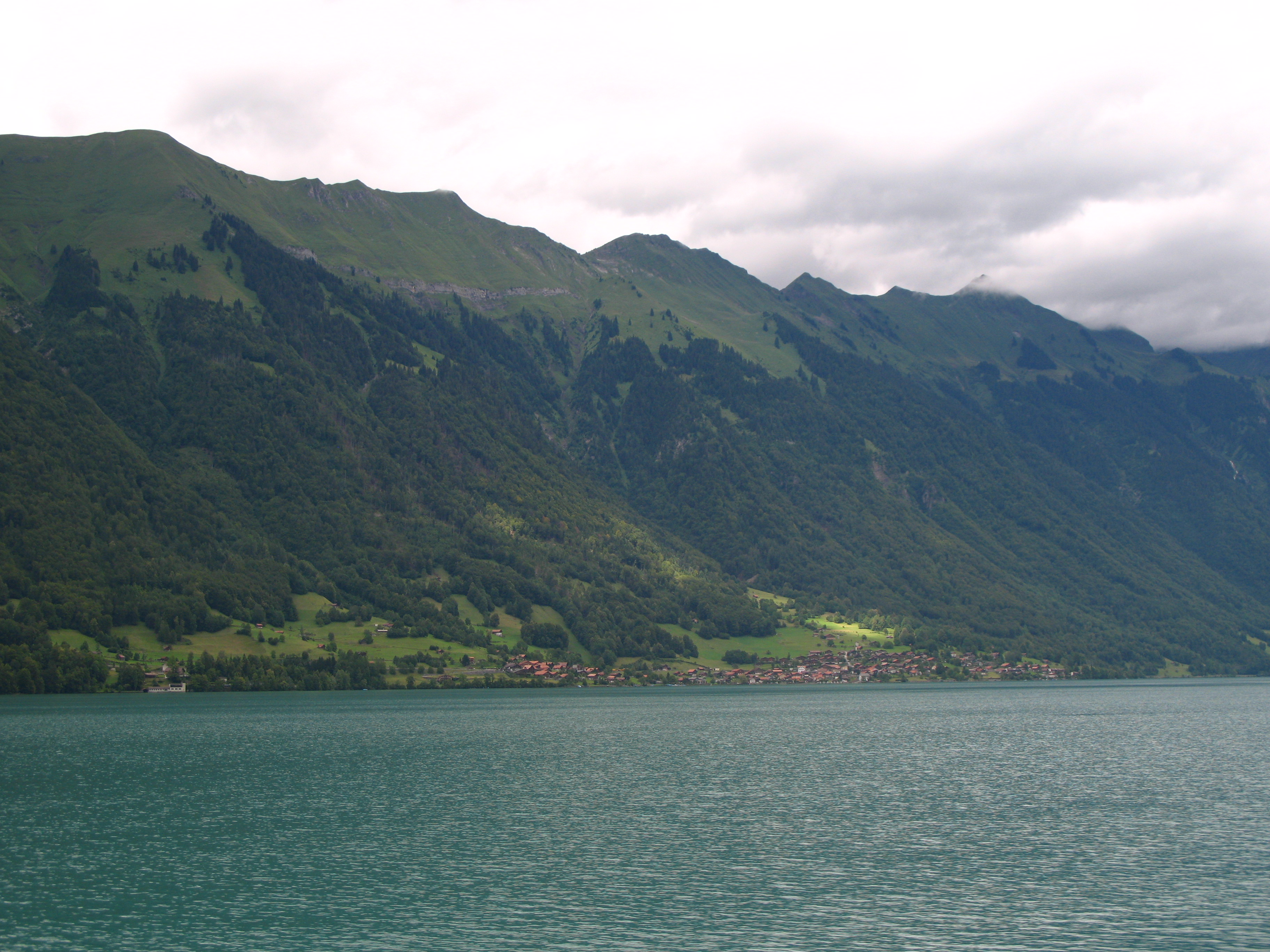
Oberried village and the surrounding lake and mountains

Oberried am Brienzersee is located in the Bernese Oberland at the north shore of Lake Brienz. The highest mountain in the municipality is the Tannhorn (2,221 m (7,287 ft)). It includes the sections of Dörfli, Mehrendorf and Ebligen on the shore of the lake and then rises into the alps. In addition to the Tannhorn, the Augstmatthorn and Riederengrat as well as peaks around the Riederengrat are part of the municipality.

The municipality has an area of 20.14 km^{2} (7.78 sq mi). Of this area, 7.69 km^{2} (2.97 mi^{2}) or 38.2% is used for agricultural purposes, while 8.72 km^{2} (3.37 mi^{2}) or 43.3% is forested. Of the rest of the land, 0.48 km^{2} (0.19 mi^{2}) or 2.4% is settled (buildings or roads), 0.09 km^{2} (22 acres) or 0.4% is either rivers or lakes and 3.06 km^{2} (1.18 mi^{2}) or 15.2% is unproductive land.

Of the built up area, housing and buildings made up 1.0% and transportation infrastructure made up 1.1%. Out of the forested land, 37.8% of the total land area is heavily forested and 3.0% is covered with orchards or small clusters of trees. Of the agricultural land, 4.1% is pastures and 33.9% is used for alpine pastures. All the water in the municipality is flowing water. Of the unproductive areas, 10.4% is unproductive vegetation and 4.8% is too rocky for vegetation.

On 31 December 2009 Amtsbezirk Interlaken, the municipality's former district, was dissolved. On the following day, 1 January 2010, it joined the newly created Verwaltungskreis Interlaken-Oberhasli.

== Coat of arms ==
The blazon of the municipal coat of arms is Argent a Semi Ibex rampant Sable langued Gules and a Chief Vert. It symbolizes the marsh (German: ried) from which the municipalities take their names. On the coat of arms of Oberried the green field appears above (German: ober) the ibex, while on the one from Niederried it is below (German: nieder). This makes the coat of arms an example of canting arms.

== Demographics ==
Oberried am Brienzersee has a population (as of December 2020) of 461. As of 2010, 8.3% of the population are resident foreign nationals. Over the last 10 years (2000-2010) the population has changed at a rate of -1.6%. Migration accounted for 4.8%, while births and deaths accounted for -3.2%.

Most of the population (as of 2000) speaks German (460 or 94.8%) as their first language, Italian is the second most common (5 or 1.0%) and Dutch is the third (5 or 1.0%). There are 2 people who speak French and 1 person who speaks Romansh.

As of 2008, the population was 49.4% male and 50.6% female. The population was made up of 221 Swiss men (45.9% of the population) and 17 (3.5%) non-Swiss men. There were 221 Swiss women (45.9%) and 23 (4.8%) non-Swiss women. Of the population in the municipality, 202 or about 41.6% were born in Oberried am Brienzersee and lived there in 2000. There were 153 or 31.5% who were born in the same canton, while 74 or 15.3% were born somewhere else in Switzerland, and 46 or 9.5% were born outside of Switzerland.

As of 2010, children and teenagers (0–19 years old) make up 17.2% of the population, while adults (20–64 years old) make up 62.7% and seniors (over 64 years old) make up 20.1%.

As of 2000, there were 192 people who were single and never married in the municipality. There were 242 married individuals, 31 widows or widowers and 20 individuals who are divorced.

As of 2000, there were 85 households that consist of only one person and 10 households with five or more people. In 2000, a total of 198 apartments (50.9% of the total) were permanently occupied, while 152 apartments (39.1%) were seasonally occupied and 39 apartments (10.0%) were empty. The vacancy rate for the municipality, in 2011, was 0.99%.

The historical population is given in the following chart:

== Heritage sites of national significance ==
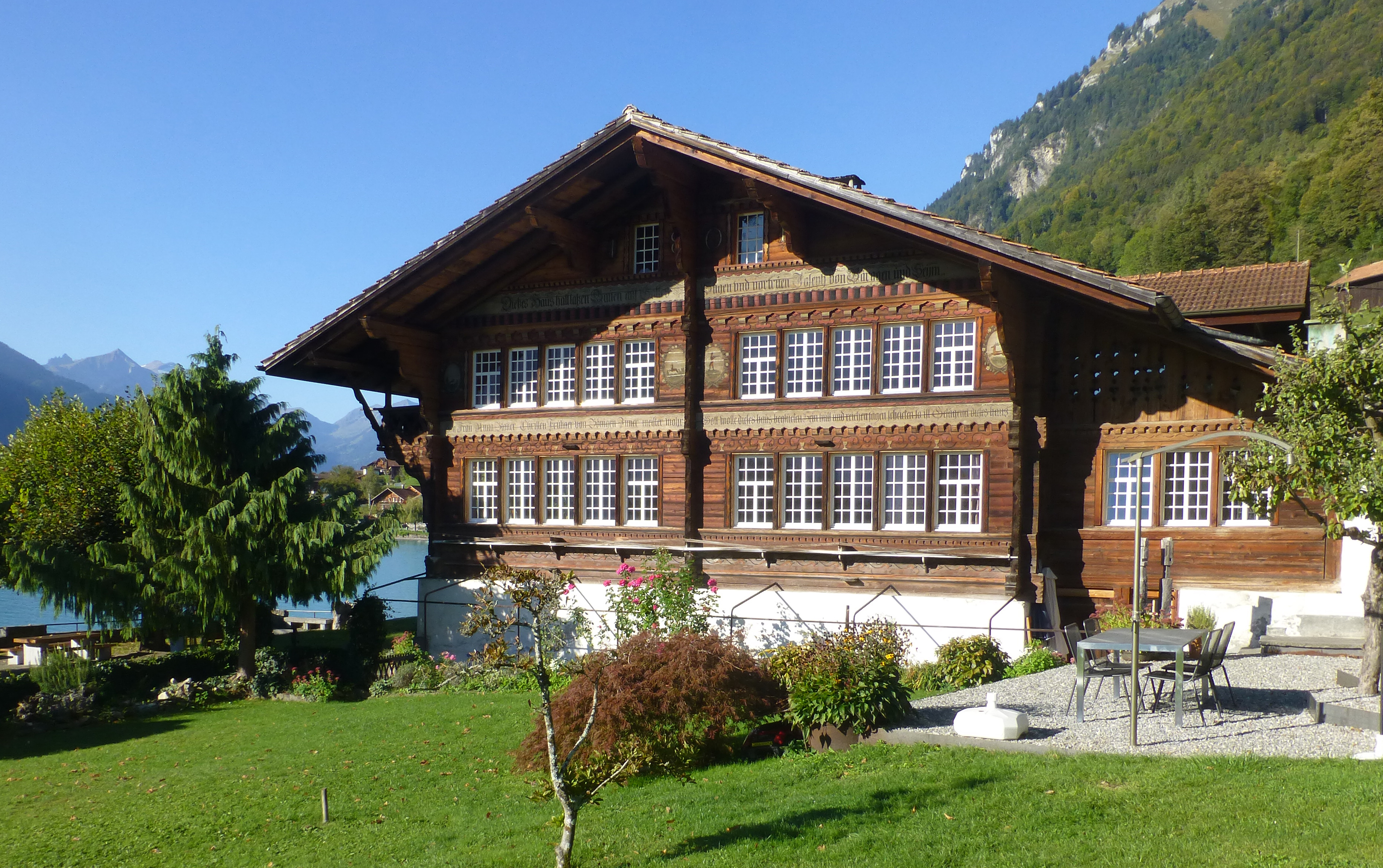
Farm house at Platzli 83

The farm house at Platzli 83 is listed as a Swiss heritage site of national significance.

== Politics ==
In the 2011 federal election the most popular party was the Swiss People's Party (SVP) which received 36.8% of the vote. The next three most popular parties were the Conservative Democratic Party (BDP) (14.3%), the Green Party (12.5%) and the Social Democratic Party (SP) (11%). In the federal election, a total of 167 votes were cast, and the voter turnout was 43.5%.

== Economy ==
As of 2011, Oberried am Brienzersee had an unemployment rate of 0.92%. As of 2008, there were a total of 152 people employed in the municipality. Of these, there were 27 people employed in the primary economic sector and about 10 businesses involved in this sector. 28 people were employed in the secondary sector and there were 6 businesses in this sector. 97 people were employed in the tertiary sector, with 13 businesses in this sector. There were 229 residents of the municipality who were employed in some capacity, of which females made up 41.5% of the workforce.

In 2008 there were a total of 118 full-time equivalent jobs. The number of jobs in the primary sector was 13, of which 10 were in agriculture and 3 were in forestry or lumber production. The number of jobs in the secondary sector was 27 of which 22 or (81.5%) were in manufacturing and 3 (11.1%) were in construction. The number of jobs in the tertiary sector was 78. In the tertiary sector; 4 or 5.1% were in wholesale or retail sales or the repair of motor vehicles, 10 or 12.8% were in a hotel or restaurant, 5 or 6.4% were in education and 52 or 66.7% were in health care.

In 2000, there were 78 workers who commuted into the municipality and 160 workers who commuted away. The municipality is a net exporter of workers, with about 2.1 workers leaving the municipality for every one entering. Of the working population, 16.2% used public transportation to get to work, and 54.1% used a private car.

== Religion ==
From the 2000 census, 51 or 10.5% were Roman Catholic, while 371 or 76.5% belonged to the Swiss Reformed Church. Of the rest of the population, there were 16 individuals (or about 3.30% of the population) who belonged to another Christian church. There were 7 (or about 1.44% of the population) who were Islamic. There was 1 person who was Buddhist, 1 person who was Hindu and 1 individual who belonged to another church. 38 (or about 7.84% of the population) belonged to no church, are agnostic or atheist, and 7 individuals (or about 1.44% of the population) did not answer the question.

== Education ==
In Oberried am Brienzersee about 220 or (45.4%) of the population have completed non-mandatory upper secondary education, and 40 or (8.2%) have completed additional higher education (either university or a Fachhochschule). Of the 40 who completed tertiary schooling, 60.0% were Swiss men, 22.5% were Swiss women, 15.0% were non-Swiss men.

The Canton of Bern school system provides one year of non-obligatory Kindergarten, followed by six years of Primary school. This is followed by three years of obligatory lower Secondary school where the students are separated according to ability and aptitude. Following the lower Secondary students may attend additional schooling or they may enter an apprenticeship.

During the 2010–11 school year, there were a total of 36 students attending classes in Oberried am Brienzersee. There was one kindergarten class with a total of 17 students in the municipality. Of the kindergarten students, 11.8% have a different mother language than the classroom language. The municipality had one primary class and 19 students. Of the primary students, 10.5% have a different mother language than the classroom language.

As of 2000, there were 2 students in Oberried am Brienzersee who came from another municipality, while 17 residents attended schools outside the municipality.

== Transport ==
Both Oberried am Brienzersee station and Ebligen station are on the Zentralbahn railway company's Brünig line, and are served by hourly Regio trains running between Interlaken and Meiringen. The municipality can be reached by car and ship as well. In winter, the train tracks or canton road can sometimes be blocked because of avalanches. In such cases the ships which otherwise operate only in the summer carry passengers in the winter as well.

The bridge at Hirscherengraben on the road towards Brienz is built so that an avalanche will carry the bridge directly into Lake Brienz. In some winters, the bridge was destroyed several times by avalanches. The avalanches break out at Brienz Ridge, nearly 2,000 m (6,600 ft) above sea level, and often thunder all the way into the lake (564 m (1,850 ft)), over a horizontal distance of only 2,300 m (7,500 ft).
