= Ebligen railway station =

Railway station in Oberried am Brienzersee, Switzerland

Ebligen
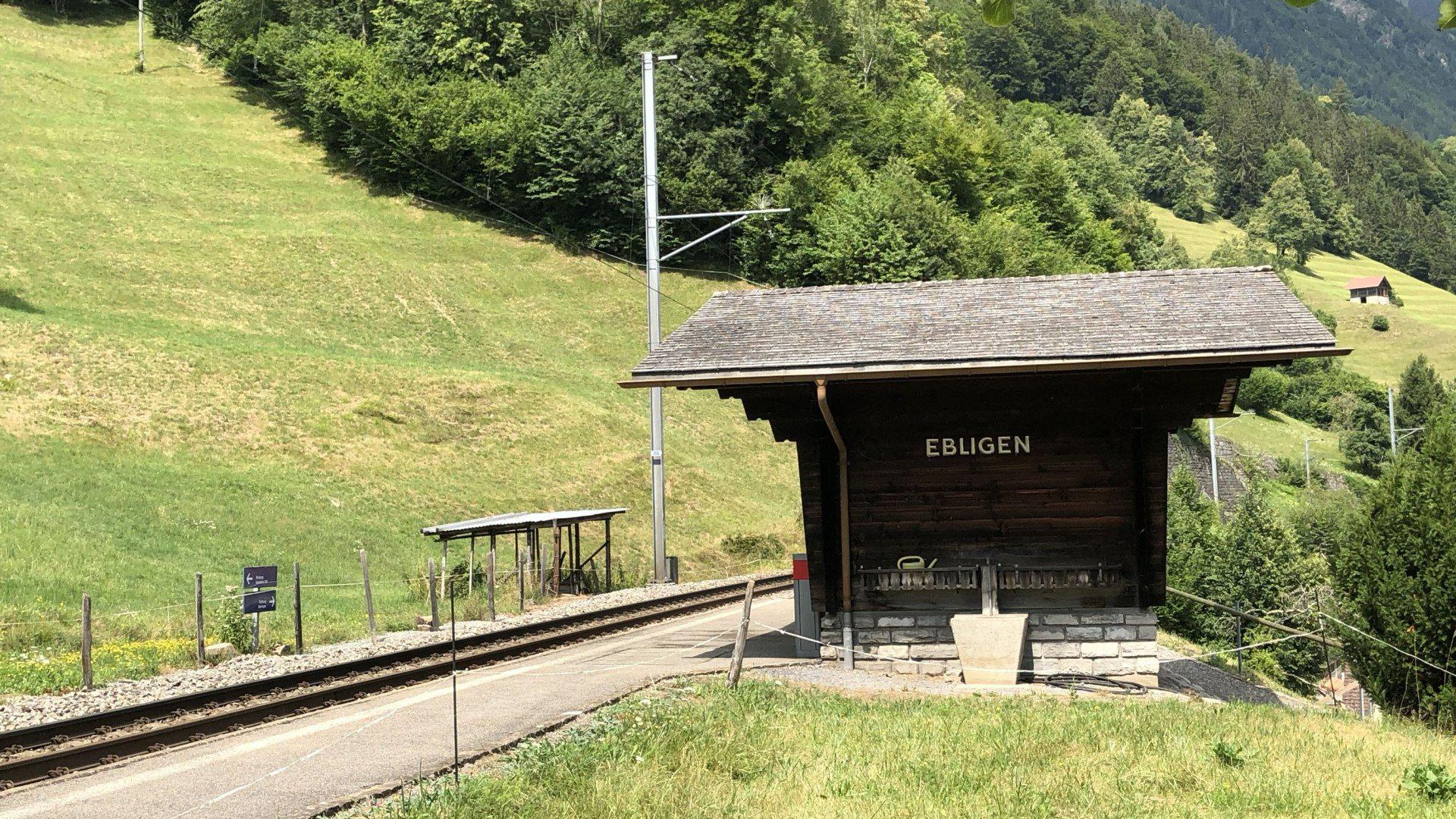
- The station in 2018

General information
- Location: Oberried am Brienzersee; Switzerland
- Coordinates: 46°45′09″N 7°59′24″E
- Elevation: 582 m (1,909 ft)
- Owner: Zentralbahn
- Line: Brünig line
- Train operators: Zentralbahn

Services
Preceding station	Zentralbahn	Following station
Oberried am Brienzersee towards Interlaken Ost	Regio	Brienz West towards Meiringen
Location
- Location within Switzerland Location within Canton of Bern

Ebligen railway station is a Swiss railway station near the settlement of Ebligen in the municipality of Oberried am Brienzersee and the canton of Bern. Ebligen is a stop on the Brünig line, owned by the Zentralbahn, that operates between Interlaken and Lucerne.

== Services ==
The following services stop at Ebligen:

- Regio: hourly service between Interlaken Ost and Meiringen.
