= Sörenberg =

Village in Flühli, Switzerland

Coordinates: 46°49′22″N 8°02′00″E

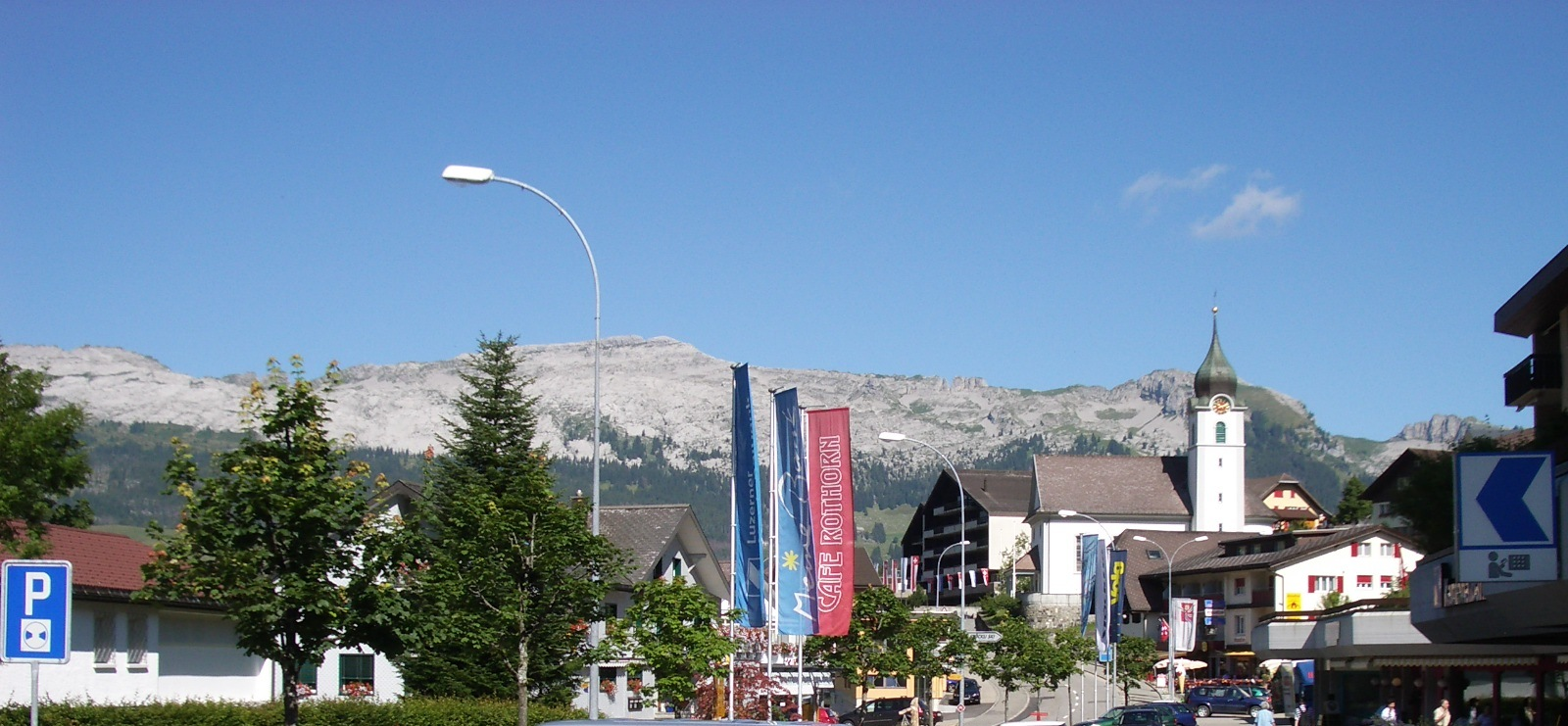
View of Sörenberg

Sörenberg is a village in the Swiss Alps, located in the southern part of the canton of Lucerne. The village lies in the municipality of Flühli in the Entlebuch region, near the upper end of the Waldemme valley.

Sörenberg lies at an altitude of 1,159 metres (3,802 ft) above sea level and is surrounded by mountains over 2,000 metres (6,600 ft). On its south side the village is overlooked by the Brienzer Rothorn (2,350 m / 7,710 ft), the highest mountain in the canton of Lucerne. On the west is the Schrattenfluh (2,092 m / 6,864 ft), a large karstic mountain. To the east, the Glaubenbielen Pass crosses to Giswil in the canton of Obwalden.

In winter Sörenberg includes a ski area. A year-round cable car leads to the summit of the Brienzer Rothorn.

== See also ==
- List of ski areas and resorts in Switzerland
