= Flühli =

- Municipality
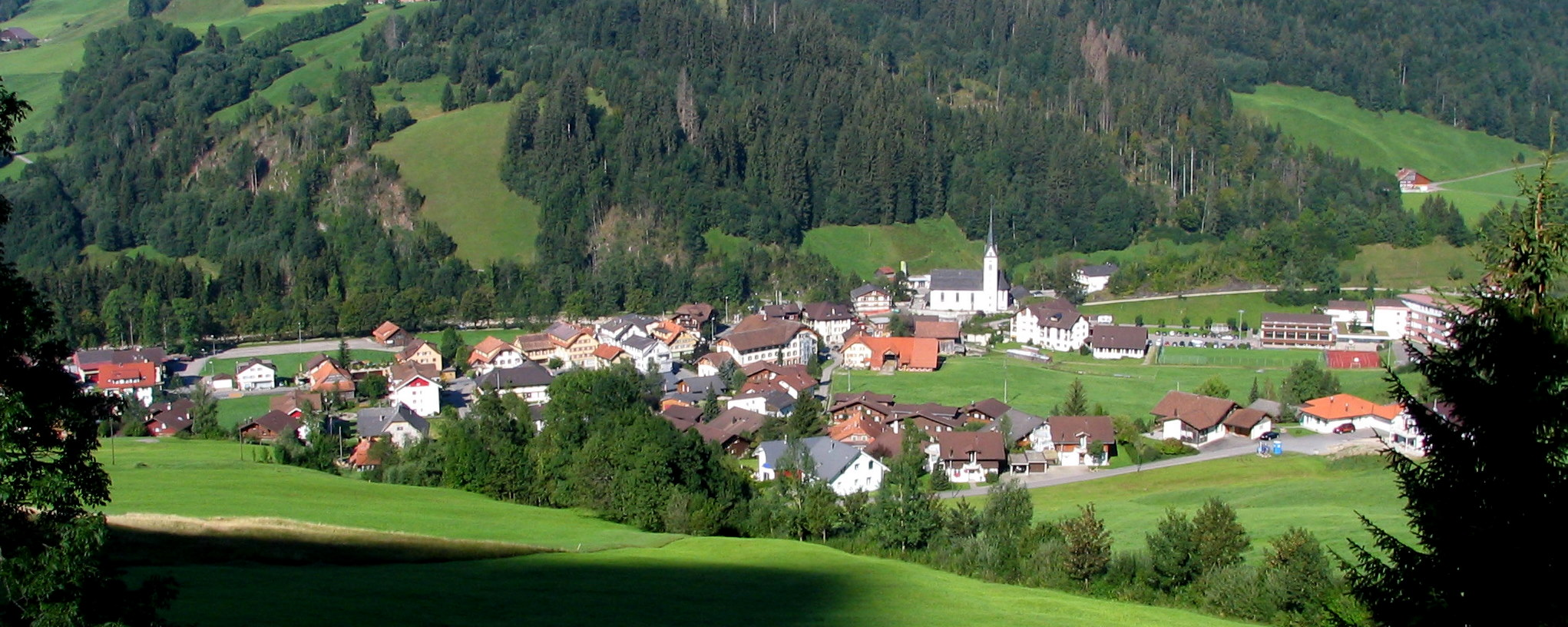

- Coat of arms
- Location of Flühli
- Location within Switzerland Location within Canton of Lucerne
- Coordinates: 46°53′N 8°1′E
- Country: Switzerland
- Canton: Lucerne
- District: Entlebuch

Area
  - Total: 108.24 km^{2} (41.79 sq mi)
- Elevation: 884 m (2,900 ft)

Population (December 2020)
  - Total: 1,836
  - Density: 16.96/km^{2} (43.93/sq mi)
- Time zone: UTC+01:00 (CET)
  - Summer (DST): UTC+02:00 (CEST)
- Postal code: 6173
- SFOS number: 1004
- ISO 3166 code: CH-LU
- Surrounded by: Brienz (BE), Escholzmatt, Giswil (OW), Habkern (BE), Hasle, Marbach, Oberried am Brienzersee (BE), Sarnen (OW), Schangnau (BE), Schüpfheim, Schwanden bei Brienz (BE)
- Website: www.fluehli.ch

Flühli is a municipality in the district of Entlebuch in the canton of Lucerne in Switzerland. The municipality consists of the villages of Flühli and Sörenberg, which form independent parishes. Flühli is part of the UNESCO Entlebuch Biosphere Reserve since 2001.

== History ==
Flühli is first mentioned in the 17th century as güetli uf dem Flüöli.

The battle of Sörenberg was fought in 1380 between Obwalden and Entlebuch.

The region was only settled year-round in the 17th century.

== Geography ==
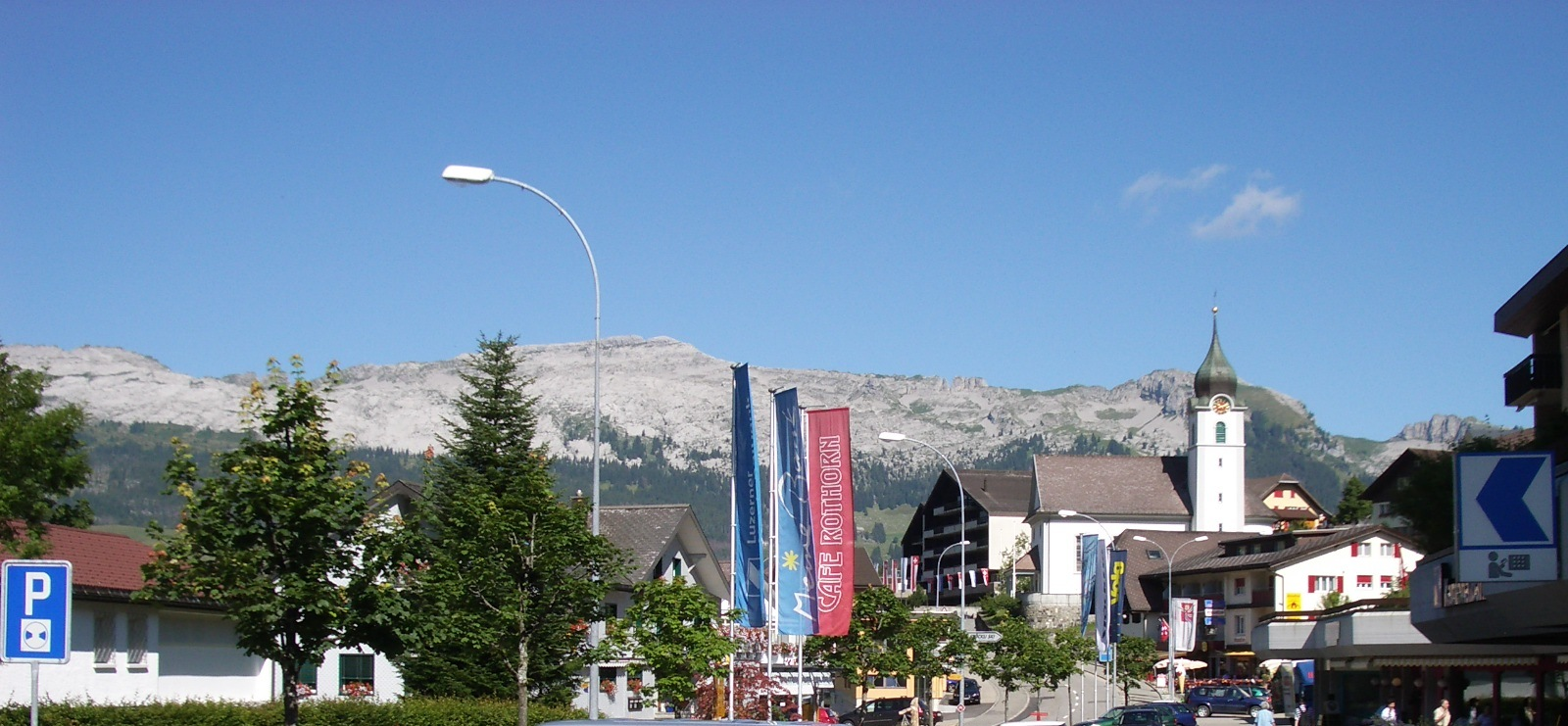
The village Sörenberg

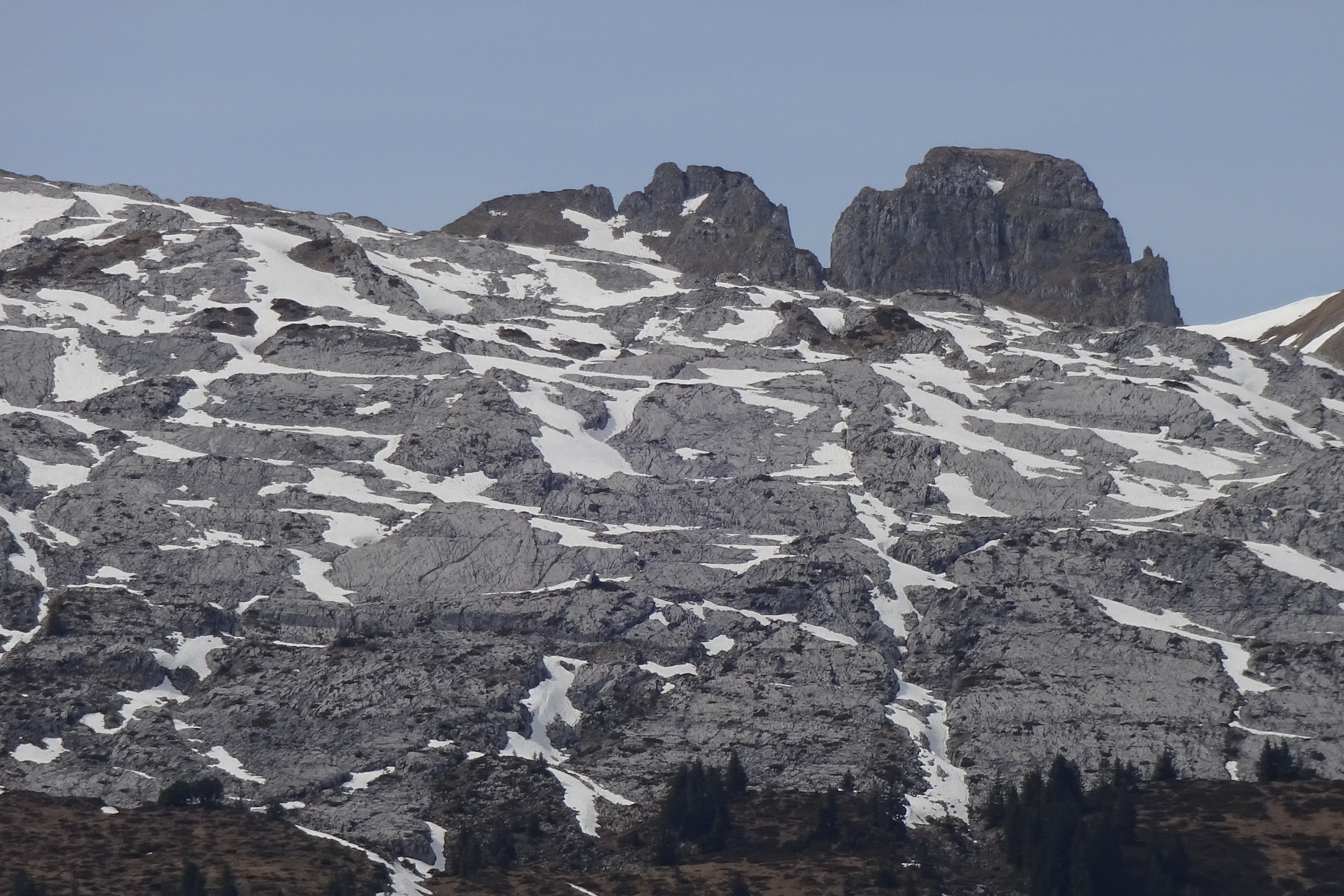
Sörenberg - Salwideli : Schrattenfluh (Hengst) south-east face - limestone pavement

Aerial view (1954)

The municipality of Flühli is the largest in the canton of Lucerne and is located in the Alpine foothills in the valley of the Waldemme river. It consists of the villages of Flühli and, further up the valley, Sörenberg. The municipality then rises up to its highest points, at the Brienzer Rothorn and Tannhorn summits of the Emmental Alps.

The municipality of Flühli has an area of 108.1 km^{2} (41.7 sq mi). Of this area, 44.8% is used for agricultural purposes, while 37.9% is forested. Of the rest of the land, 2.2% is settled (buildings or roads) and the remainder (15.1%) is non-productive (rivers, glaciers or mountains). In the 1997 land survey, 37.89% of the total land area was forested. Of the agricultural land, 44.79% is used for farming or pastures, while 0.06% is used for orchards or vine crops. Of the settled areas, 0.94% is covered with buildings, 0.06% is industrial, 0.18% is classed as special developments, 0.04% is parks or greenbelts and 0.99% is transportation infrastructure. Of the unproductive areas, 0.02% is unproductive standing water (ponds or lakes), 1.01% is unproductive flowing water (rivers) and 14.03% is other unproductive land.

== Demographics ==
Flühli has a population (as of 31 December 2020) of 1,836. As of 2007, 15.6% of the population was made up of foreign nationals. Over the last 10 years the population has grown at a rate of 4.9%. Most of the population (as of 2000) speaks German (93.5%), with Albanian being second most common ( 1.0%) and Italian being third ( 0.8%).

In the 2007 election the most popular party was the CVP which received 48.3% of the vote. The next three most popular parties were the SVP (26.5%), the FDP (20.8%) and the SPS (2.3%).

The age distribution in Flühli is; 502 people or 26.1% of the population is 0–19 years old. 577 people or 30% are 20–39 years old, and 561 people or 29.2% are 40–64 years old. The senior population distribution is 205 people or 10.7% are 65–79 years old, 69 or 3.6% are 80–89 years old and 8 people or 0.4% of the population are 90+ years old.

The entire Swiss population is generally well educated. In Flühli about 58.1% of the population (between age 25 and 64) have completed either non-mandatory upper secondary education or additional higher education (either university or a Fachhochschule).

As of 2000 there are 595 households, of which 177 households (or about 29.7%) contain only a single individual. 97 or about 16.3% are large households, with at least five members. As of 2000 there were 401 inhabited buildings in the municipality, of which 217 were built only as housing, and 184 were mixed use buildings. There were 137 single family homes, 47 double family homes, and 33 multi-family homes in the municipality. Most homes were either two (122) or three (72) story structures. There were only 10 single story buildings and 13 four or more story buildings.

Flühli has an unemployment rate of 0.64%. As of 2005, there were 250 people employed in the primary economic sector and about 102 businesses involved in this sector. 87 people are employed in the secondary sector and there are 24 businesses in this sector. 346 people are employed in the tertiary sector, with 65 businesses in this sector. As of 2000 45.9% of the population of the municipality were employed in some capacity. At the same time, females made up 35.2% of the workforce.

In the 2000 census the religious membership of Flühli was; 1,412 (81.3%) were Roman Catholic, and 136 (7.8%) were Protestant, with an additional 14 (0.81%) that were of some other Christian faith. There are 40 individuals (2.3% of the population) who are Muslim. Of the rest; there were 32 (1.84%) individuals who belong to another religion, 50 (2.88%) who do not belong to any organized religion, 53 (3.05%) who did not answer the question.

The historical population is given in the following table:

year	population
1784	799
1850	1,691
1900	1,388
1950	1,417
2000	1,737
