= Elisabetha Grossmann =

Swiss skipper (1795–1858)

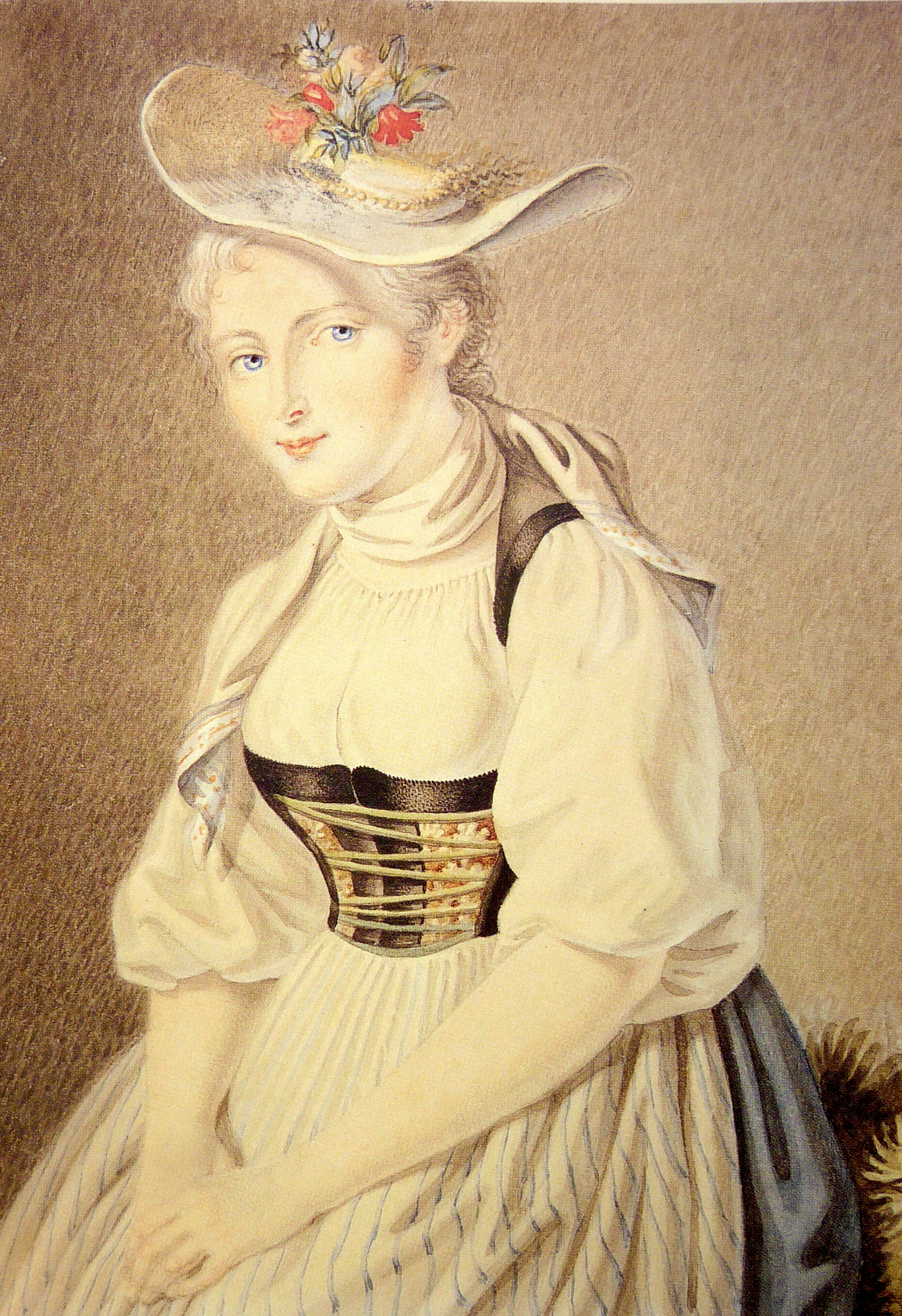
1811 portrait of Grossmann by Franz Niklaus König

Elisabetha Grossmann (1795 – 1858) was a Swiss skipper. She ferried tourists over the Lake Brienz in the early 19th-century and became herself a famous tourist attraction for her beauty, known as La belle batelière de Brienz or Die schöne Schifferin von Brienz ('The Fair Skipper of Brienz').
