= Glaubenbielen Pass =

Mountain pass in Switzerland

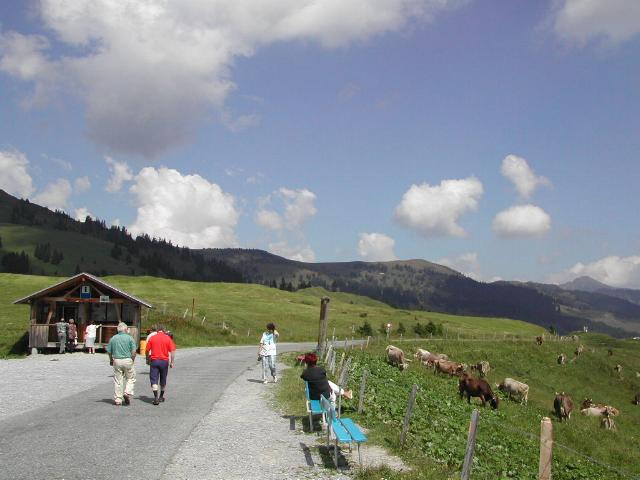
- Glaubenbielen Pass

- Location within Switzerland
- Elevation: 1,611 metres (5,285 ft)
- Traversed by: Road

Third Approach
- Location: Obwalden, Switzerland
- Range: Emmental Alps
- Coordinates: 46°49′09″N 08°05′36″E

Glaubenbielen Pass (or Glaubenbühl ) (el. 1611 m.) is a mountain pass in the Emmental Alps between the Entlebuch region of the canton of Lucerne and the canton of Obwalden. The pass itself is located within Obwalden, and connects Giswil in Obwalden and Sörenberg in the Entlebuch region. It divides the basins of the Kleine Emme and the Sarner Aa, both within the Reuss basin.

The pass road has a maximum grade of 12 percent, running along the northern slope of the Giswilerstock (2011 m). It is known as Panoramastrasse, providing a splendid view of Pilatus and the Stanserhorn when travelling towards Giswil, and of the Brienzer Rothorn massif when travelling towards Flühli.

== See also ==
- List of highest paved roads in Europe
- List of mountain passes
- List of the highest Swiss passes
