= Güpfi =

Mountain in Switzerland

- Location within Switzerland

Highest point
- Elevation: 2,043 m (6,703 ft)
- Prominence: 381 m (1,250 ft)
- Coordinates: 46°47′46″N 8°11′43″E

Geography
- Location: Obwalden, Switzerland
- Parent range: Urner Alps

The Güpfi is a mountain of the Urner Alps, overlooking Lungern in the canton of Obwalden. It lies on the range north of the Chingstuel, between the Lungerersee and the Klein Melchtal.
