= Stanserhorn =

Mountain in Switzerland

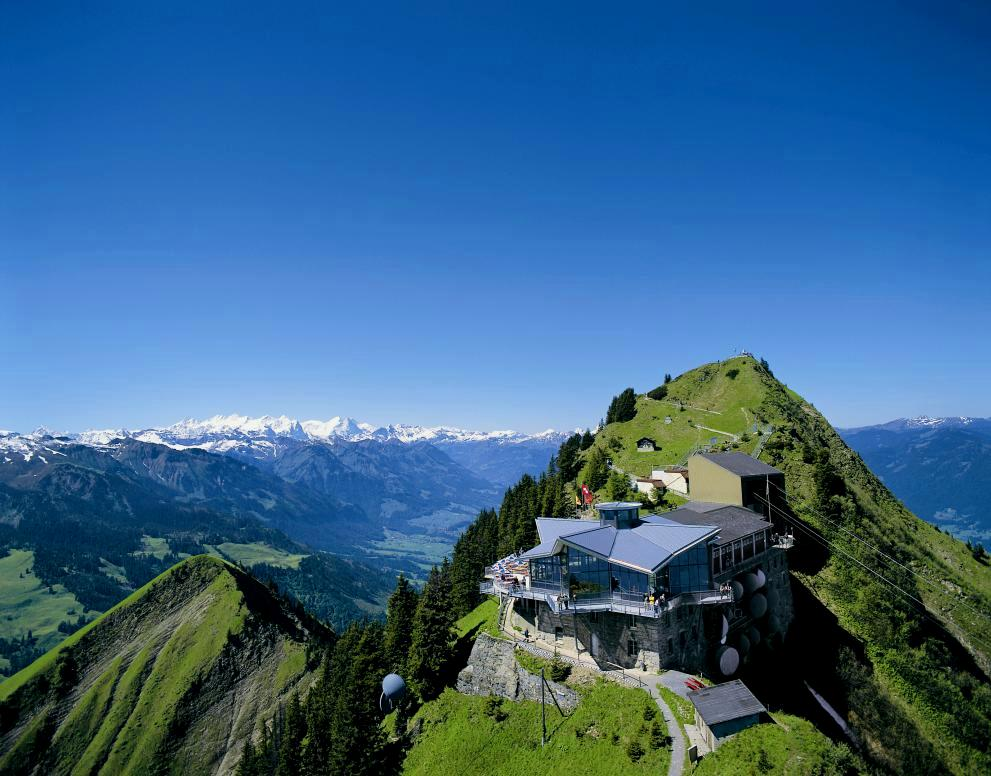
- Aerial view

Highest point
- Elevation: 1,898 m (6,227 ft)
- Prominence: 500 m (1,600 ft)
- Parent peak: Schluchberg
- Isolation: 4.3 km (2.7 mi)
- Coordinates: 46°55′47″N 8°20′25″E

Geography
- Location within Switzerland
- Location: Nidwalden, Switzerland (mountain partially in Obwalden)
- Parent range: Uri Alps

Climbing
- Easiest route: Cable car

The Stanserhorn is a mountain in Switzerland, located in the canton of Nidwalden near the border with Obwalden, with the peak at 1,898 metres (6,227 ft) above sea level.

It is a popular tourist destination, which can be reached from the adjacent town of Stans by a funicular railway and cable car, or via walking routes from Stans or Dallenwil.

== History ==
The first public transport route to the peak was started in 1891 and completed in 1893, a three section funicular railway. The builders were the business partners Franz Josef Bucher-Durrer and Josef Durrer-Gasser.

The first section started from Stans town, through the low pastures above the town and over three level crossings, to an intermediate station at Kälti (also sometimes spelt Chälti). The second section continued through forest to another intermediate station at Bluematt (also sometimes spelled Blumatt), then the third section crossed the high pastures and the exposed slope leading up to the summit station and hotel. This third section included a 160 metres (520 ft) long tunnel and a number of avalanche protection walls; the final section of it was carried on a stone embankment. Each section was electrically powered (making it one of the world's first electrically powered mountain railways), with the complete trip to the summit taking 45 minutes.

The railway ran a tourist service until 1970, when on the night of the 2/3 October the funicular cable was struck by lightning. This started a fire that destroyed the summit hotel and the driving engine for the third section in its basement. As a result of this, and also the imminent expiry of the concession, the second funicular section stopped operating in 1974. Part of the driving engine of this section can be seen today outside the summit buildings, while parts of two cars can still be seen at the former Bluematt station.

A new cable car was built to replace the two upper funicular sections, which started operation in May 1975. The first funicular section continued in operation, as it does to this day.

In 2001 a revolving restaurant was built at the summit station, and in 2003 an outside observation deck was added.

In 2010 construction work started on a new cable car to replace the 1975 installation. This was to be a new design, the world's first "CabriO" double deck open top cable car, built by Garaventa. Carrying 60 passengers per cabin with room for 30 on the open deck, passengers are able to observe the mountain scenery as well as the cable and engineering installations during the six-minute journey. While this new cable car was being built, the first funicular section and its original wooden cars were renovated. The final run of the former cable car was on 23 October 2011; the renovated funicular and new "CabriO" were opened on 29 June 2012.

== Visiting ==
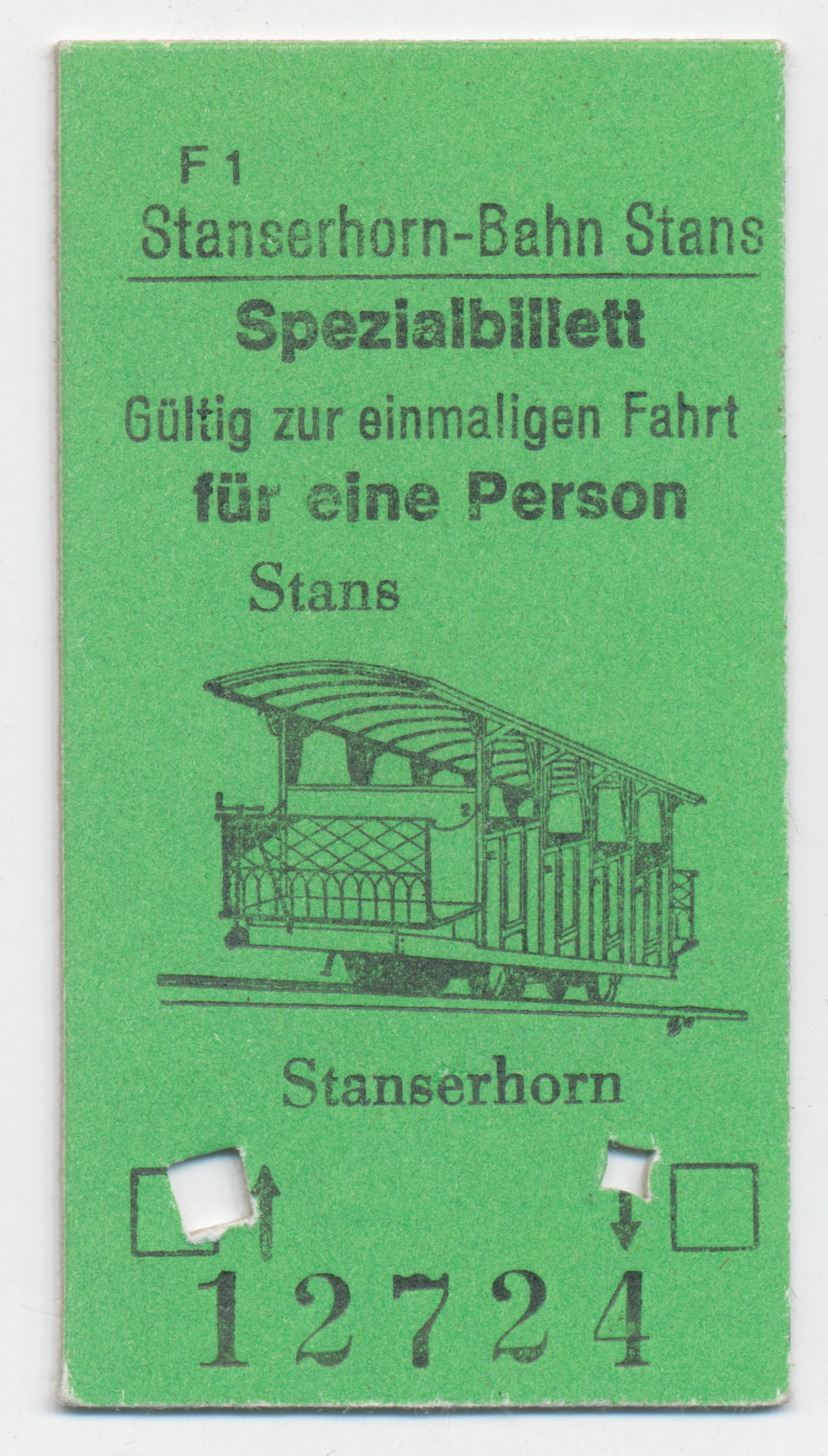
Spezialbillett (2000)

The funicular railway and cable car normally run daily from mid-April to mid-November.

The journey to the top starts in Stans town at the original 1893 bottom station (450 metres (1,480 ft) elevation), close to Stans railway station on the Luzern-Engelberg line. The journey, on the original wooden funicular wagons, takes 9 minutes to the Kälti intermediate station (714 metres (2,343 ft) altitude). From here the "CabriO" cable car takes 6 1/4 minutes to the summit station (1,850 metres (6,070 ft) altitude). The cable car closely follows the route of the original second and third stage funiculars, and the remains of the track and the Bluematt station can still be seen.

The summit buildings include a self-service restaurant, three meeting/dining rooms, a souvenir shop, and a sun terrace and observation deck.

From the summit buildings, a round trip walk is available around the summit (30 minutes), or to the peak at 1,898 metres (6,227 ft) altitude. From the peak, on a clear day, as well as the mountains around there are views as far as Alsace and the Black Forest in Germany. Ten lakes in total are visible: the Zugersee, Wichelsee, Vierwaldstättersee, Sempachersee, Sarnersee, Hallwilersee, Gerzensee, Bannalpsee, Baldeggersee and Alpnachersee.

A variety of hiking trail routes are available down to Bluematt-Kälti-Stans, Ahornhütte-Büren, Wiesenberg-Dallenwil, or Wirzweli-Wolfenschiessen. The routes to/from the summit are closed in winter or in bad weather.

== Gallery ==
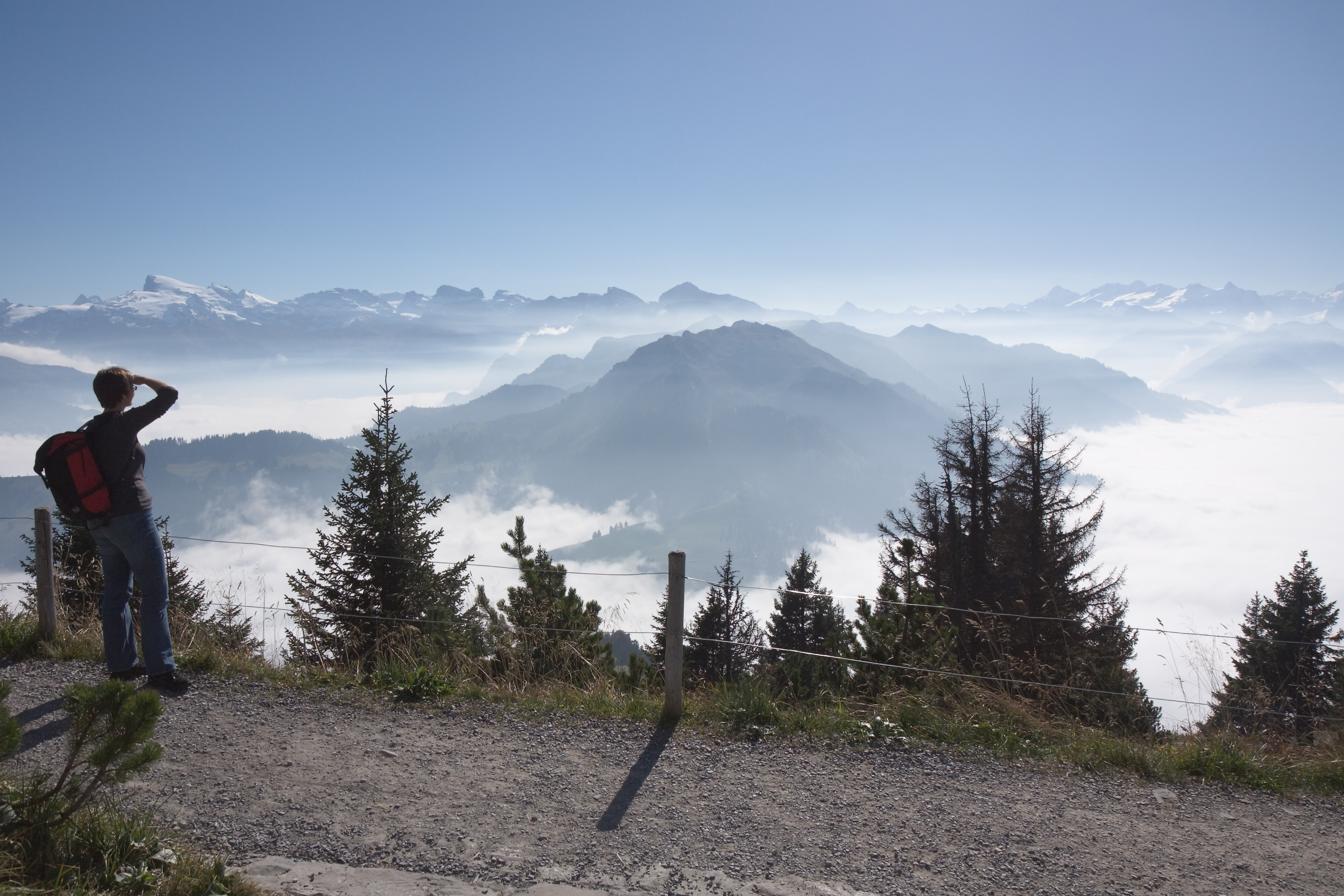
View from Stanserhorn

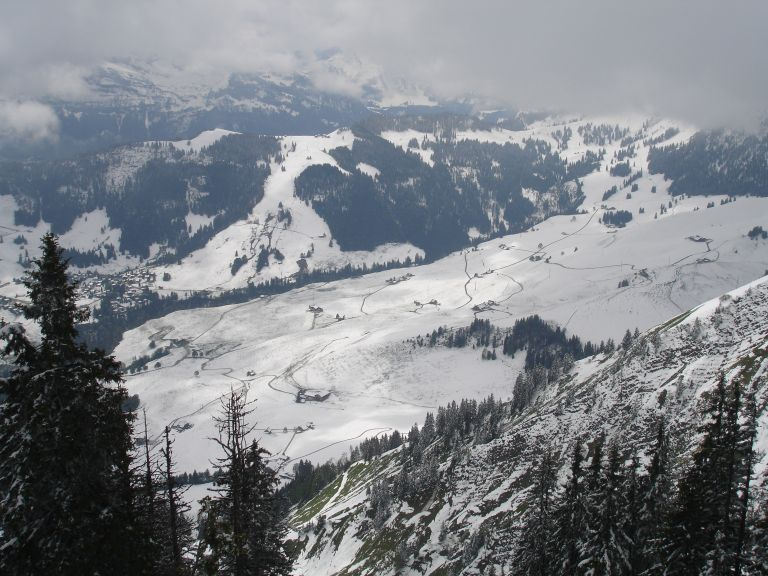

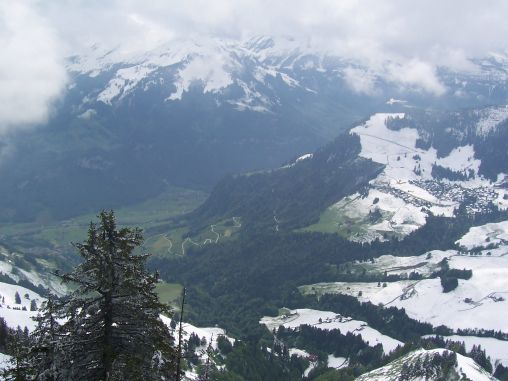

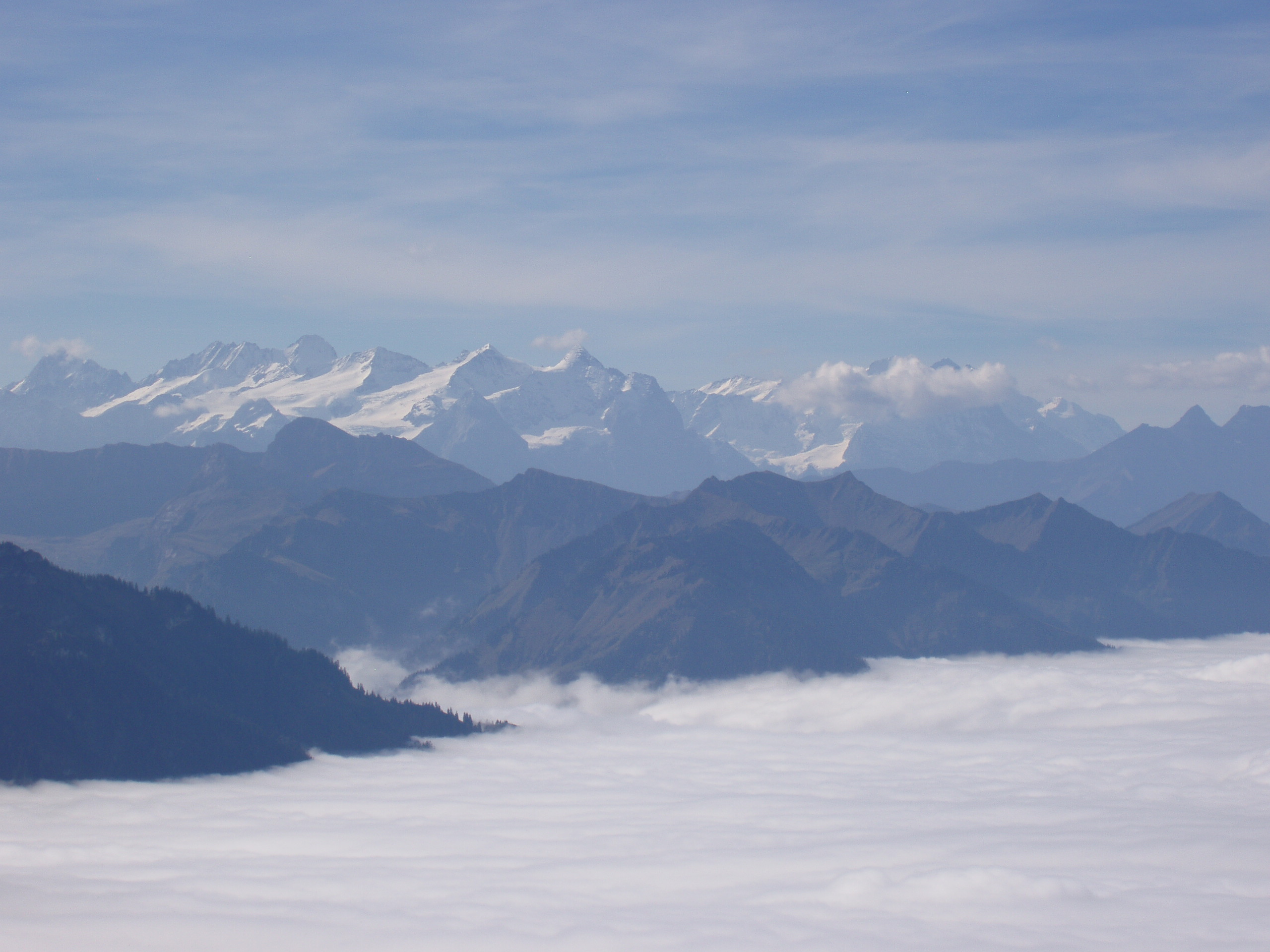

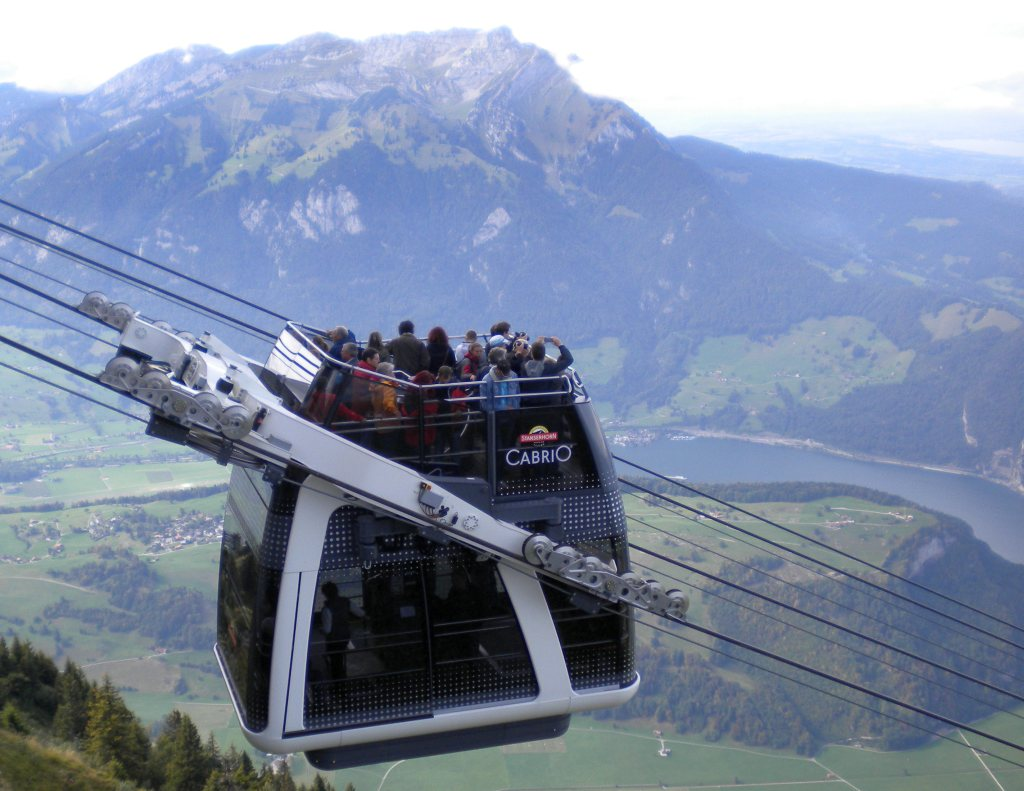
The CabriO cable car

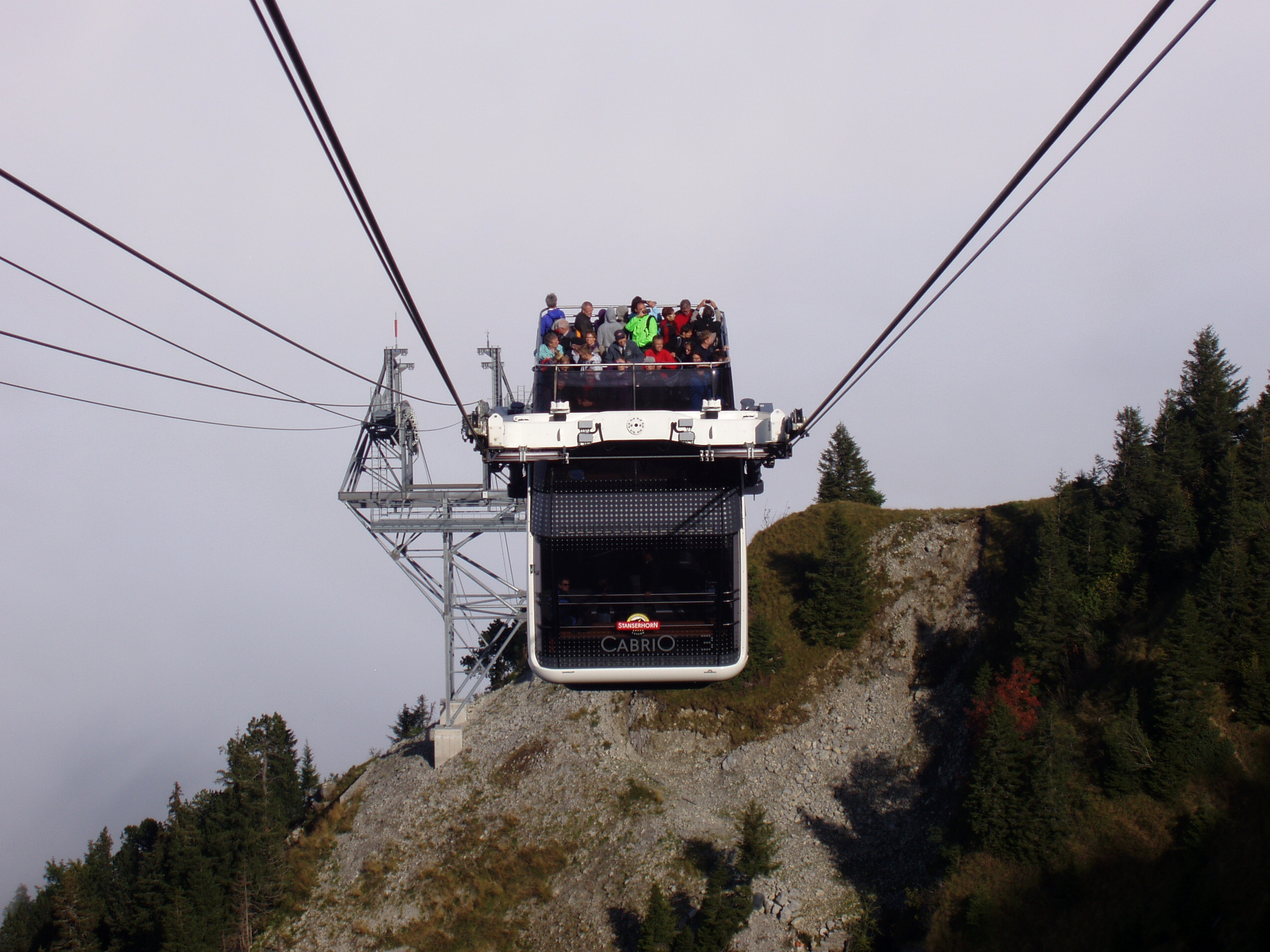
arriving at mountain station.

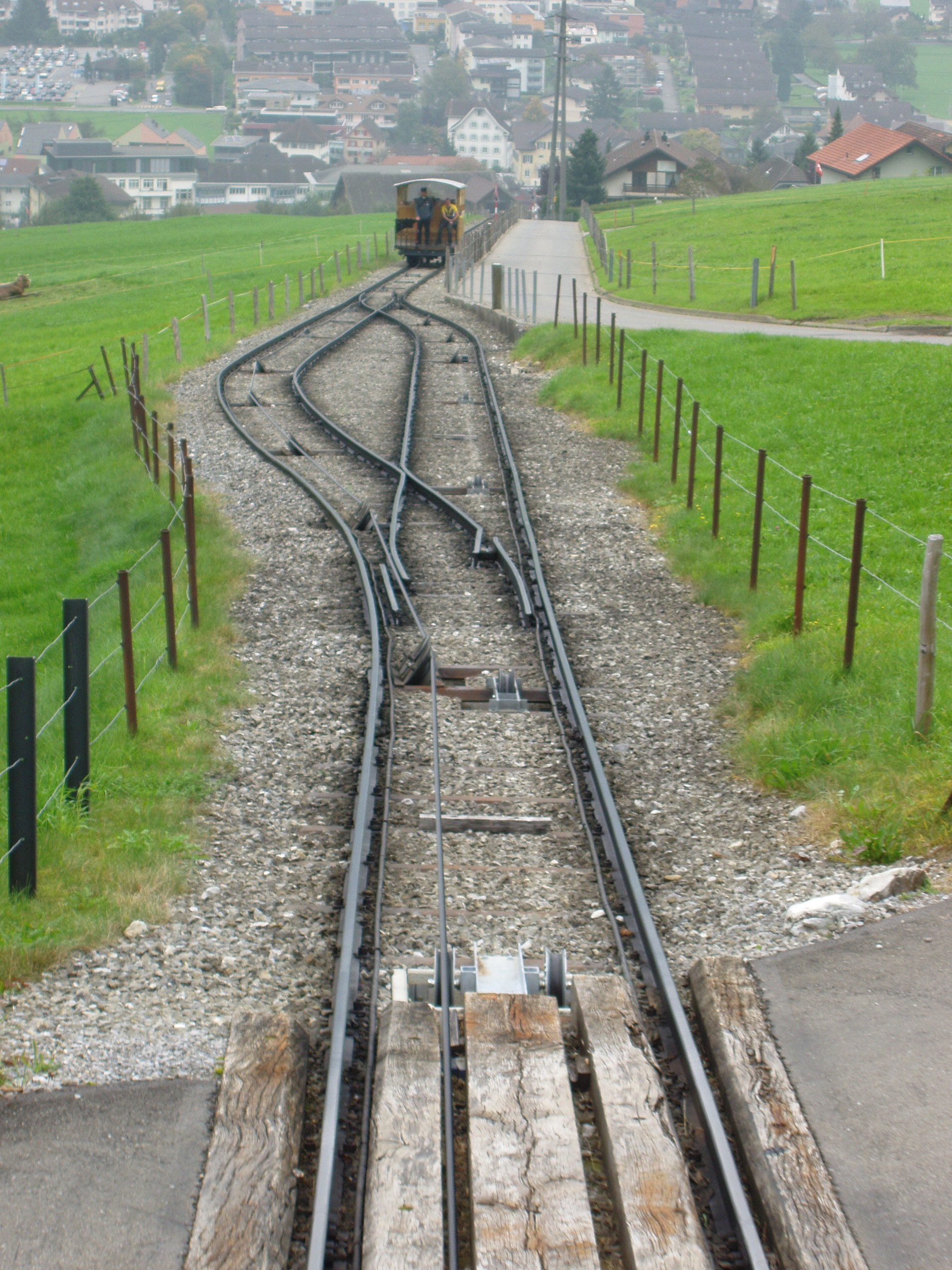
lower section funicular tracks

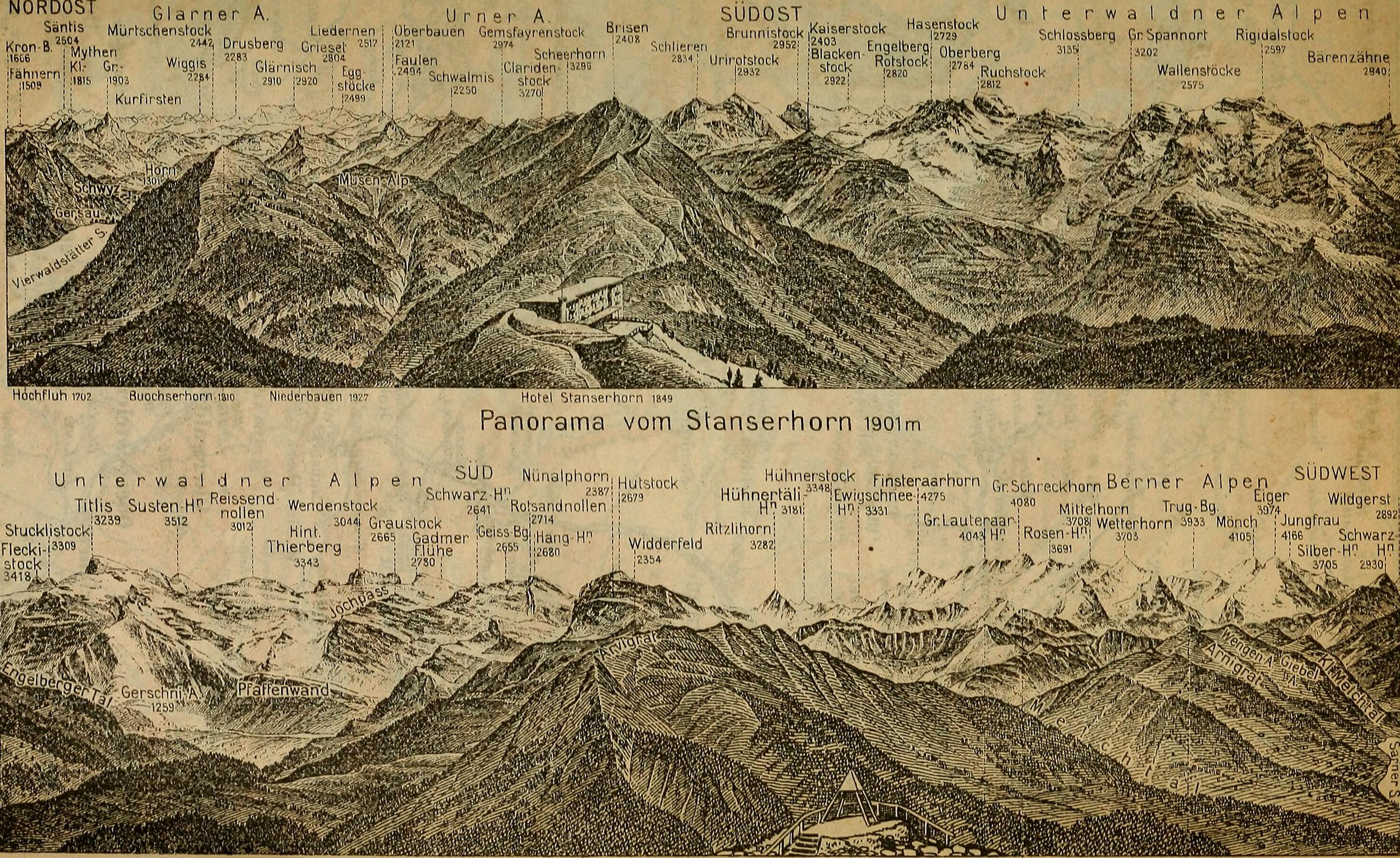

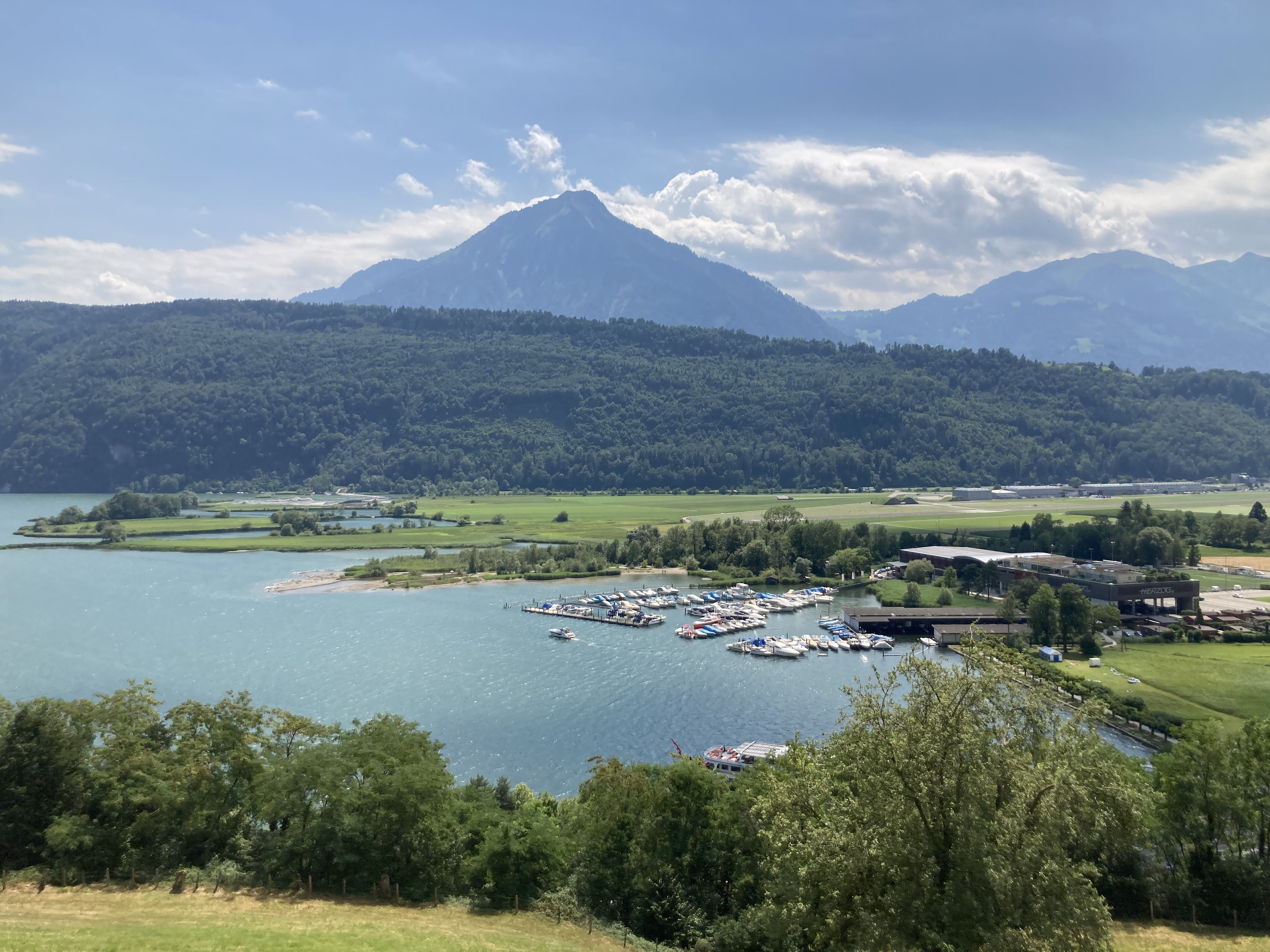
Seen behind Lake Lucerne

== See also ==
- List of mountains of Switzerland accessible by public transport
