= Monika Rüegger =

Swiss politician (born 1968)

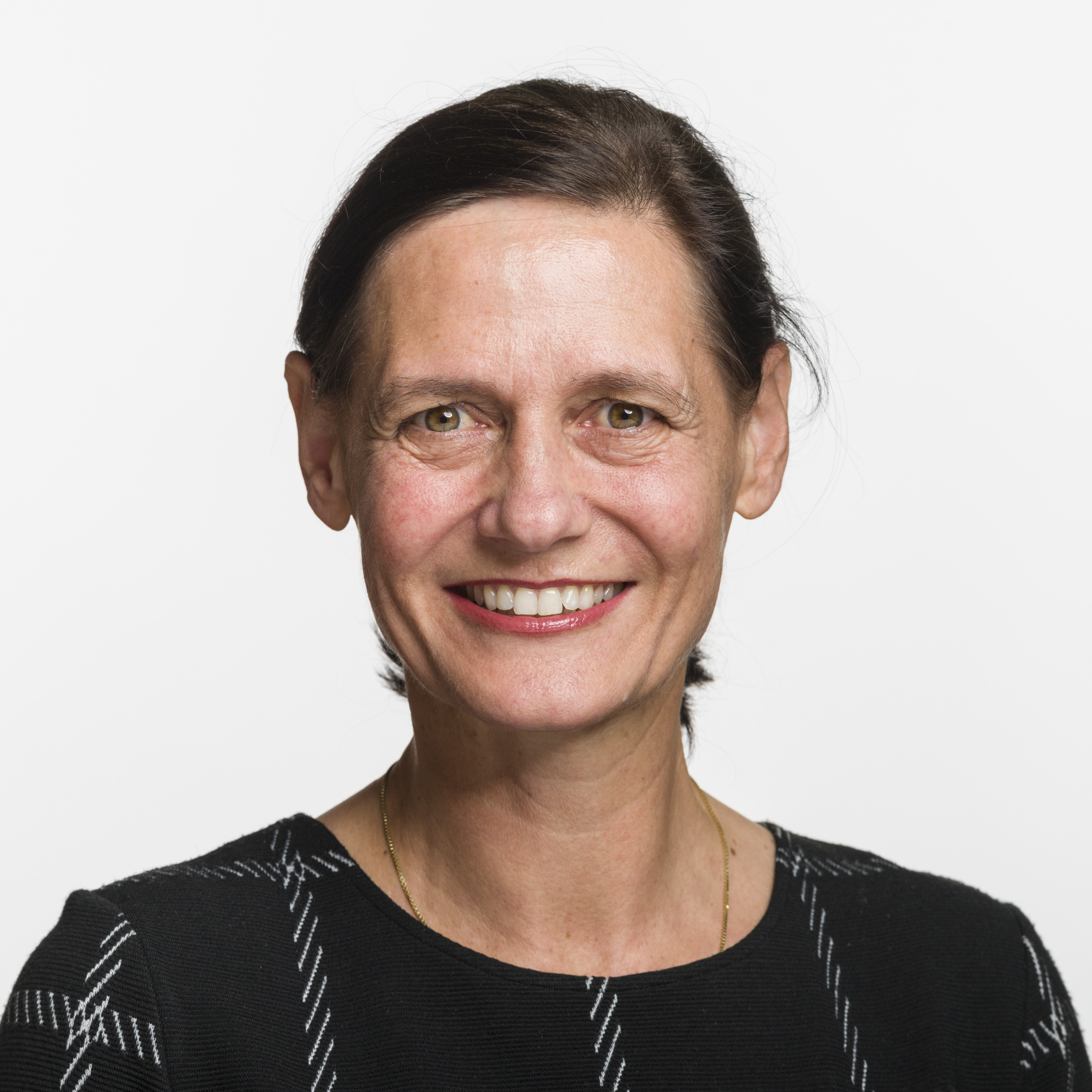
- Official portrait, 2019

Member of National Council (Switzerland)
- Incumbent
- Assumed office 2 December 2019
- Constituency: Canton of Obwalden

Member of Cantonal Council of Obwalden
- In office 2010–2020

Personal details
- Born: Monika Hurschler; March 25, 1968 (age 58) Engelberg, Switzerland
- Party: Swiss People's Party
- Website: Official website

Monika Rüegger (née Hurschler; born 25 March 1968), is a Swiss politician who has been serving on National Council (Switzerland) for the Swiss People's Party since 2019.

== Career ==
She is the first woman to represent Obwalden's constituency at the federal level. Previously, she served on Cantonal Council of Obwalden from 2010 to 2020.
