= Melchtal =

Coordinates: 46°50′03″N 8°17′21″E

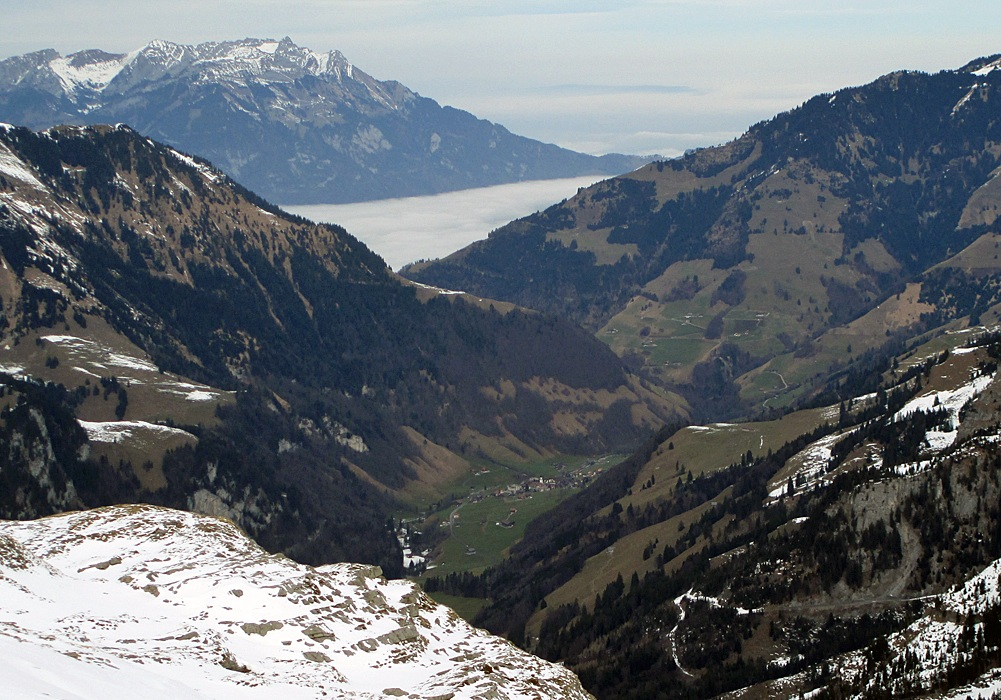
The Melchtal with its hamlet and the Pilatus as seen from the Bonistock

Melchtal is the valley of the Grosse Melchaa in the canton Obwalden, Switzerland. The hamlet located in the valley is also named Melchtal.

Most of the valley is included in the municipality of Kerns; the Melchaa constitutes the limit with Sachseln.

It is supposed to be the birthplace of the historical-mythical figure Arnold von Melchtal.
