= Eibach =

Eibach may refer to:

== Places ==
- Eibach (Nürnberg), a borough of Nuremberg
- Eibach (Dillenburg), a borough of Dillenburg

== Rivers ==
- Eibach (Bach), a stream located in the Swiss canton of Basel-Landschaft
- Eibach (Lungerersee), a stream located in the Swiss canton of Obwalden, see Lake Lungern

== Buildings ==
- Burg Eibach, the remains of an old water castle near Lindlar

== Companies ==
- Eibach GmbH, a German manufacturer of automotive coil springs (OEM and racing)
