= Rengg Pass =

- Interactive map of Rengg Pass
- Elevation: 885 metres (2,904 ft)

Third Approach
- Location: Switzerland
- Range: Alps
- Coordinates: 46°58′36″N 8°17′32″E

The Rengg Pass (locally known as Ränggpass) is a walking trail mountain pass in Switzerland, between Hergiswil in the canton of Nidwalden and Alpnach in the canton of Obwalden. It crosses the ridge running eastwards from the Pilatus towards Stanstaad.

It was the site of the Stecklikrieg battle on 28 August 1802, where insurgent Nidwaldeners defeated Swiss central government troops.

== See also ==
- List of mountain passes
