= Christian Social Party of Obwalden =

Christian Social Party of Obwalden Christlichsoziale Partei Obwalden
- Chairperson: Sepp Stalder
- Secretary: Linda Hofmann
- Founded: 1956
- Split from: Catholic Conservative Party; Liberal Party
- Ideology: Christian democracy Christian left Regionalism
- Political position: Centre
- National affiliation: Christian Social Party (observer, 2005–2010); Christian Democratic People's Party of Switzerland (group, 2011–2019)
- Colors: Red Black
- Federal Council: 0 / 7
- National Council: 0 / 200
- Executive Council of Obwalden (de): 1 / 5
- Cantonal Council: 6 / 55

Website
- www.csp-ow.ch

The Christian Social Party of Obwalden (CSP Obwalden) is a political party in the canton of Obwalden, Switzerland.

== History ==
Since the 1930s and 1940s, Christian trade unions and workers' associations existed in the canton of Obwalden. In 1956, members of the Christian Social Party faction in the Catholic Conservative Party (now the Christian Democratic People's Party, CVP) formed a political party to be more receptive to workers' concerns than the CVP. The CSP Obwalden and the Conservative Party (later the CVP Obwalden) formed a parliamentary group in the Cantonal Council even after the CSP's founding.

In 1960, a member of the CSP was elected to the Executive Council for the first time. After the CSP conducted an independent election campaign in 1982, the CVP terminated the parliamentary group; since then, the CSP has formed its own group. In 2002, the CSP Obwalden left the CVP, mainly due to tensions with the Obwaldner CVP. At that time, the CSP announced that it would focus on cantonal politics. From 2005 to 2010, the CSP Obwalden had observer status in the independent Christian-left Christian Social Party.

Since 2010, the CSP Obwalden has not been affiliated with any Swiss federal party. In the 2011 election, Karl Vogler was elected to the National Council, the first member of the CSP Obwalden to do so. He was a member of the CVP/EVP group.

== Representation ==
The CSP Obwalden has six cantonal councillors and zero national councillors.

== Election results ==
Cantonal Council
Year	Seats	+/-
1970	6 / 55	
1974	8 / 55	▲2
1978	7 / 55	▼1
1982	7 / 55	
1986	8 / 55	▲1
1990	7 / 55	▼1
1994	10 / 55	▲3
1998	10 / 55	
2002	8 / 55	▼2
2006	10 / 55	▲2
2010	8 / 55	▼2
2014	7 / 55	▼1
2018	8 / 55	▲1
2022	6 / 55	▼2
