= Grosse Melchaa =

River in Switzerland

Coordinates: 46°52′52″N 8°14′31″E

The Grosse Melchaa in Ranft, ca. 1825.

The Grosse Melchaa (also Melchaa) is a 18.5 km long affluent of the Lake Sarnen in the Canton Obwalden, Switzerland.
