= Chingstuel =

Mountain in Switzerland

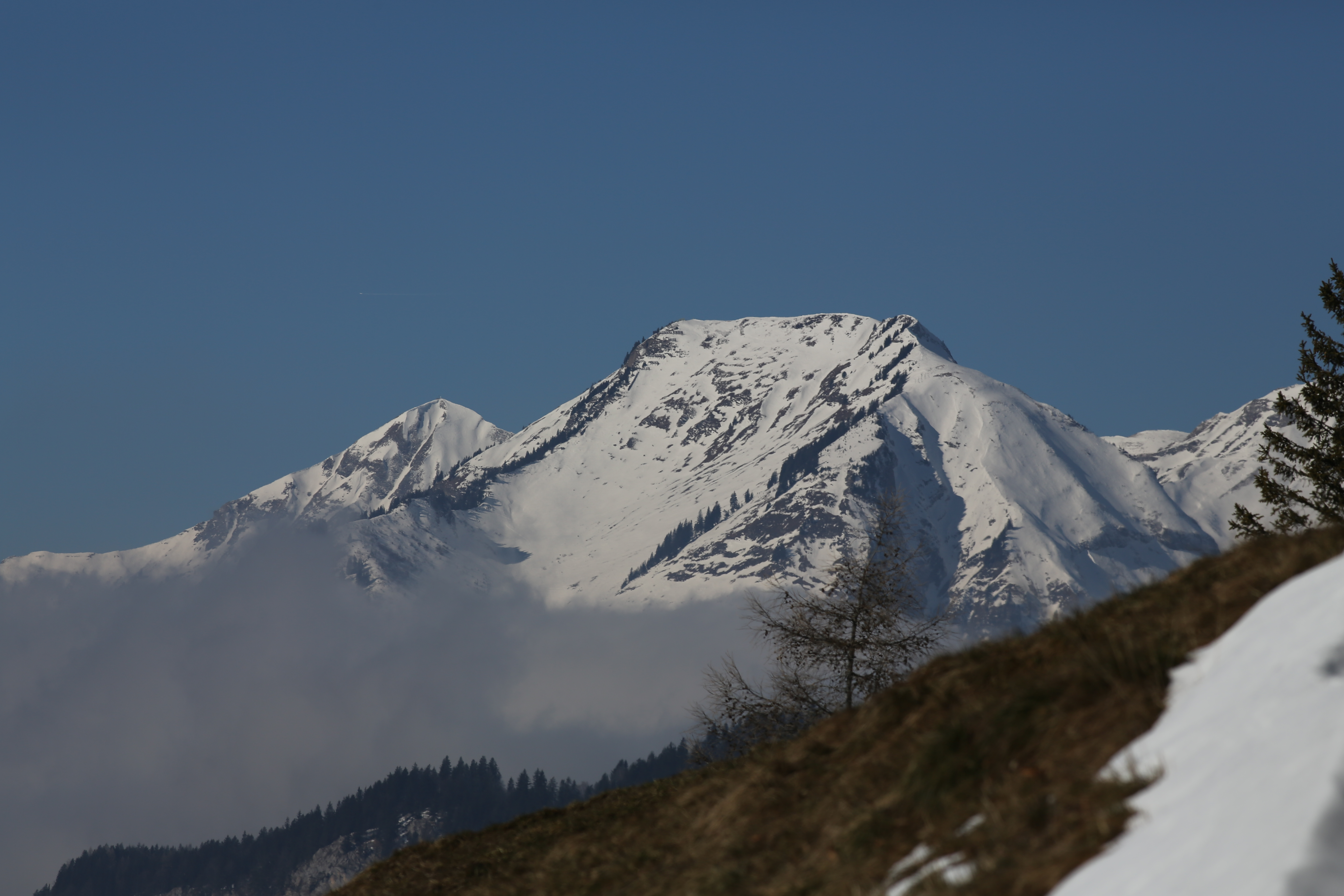

Highest point
- Elevation: 2,118 m (6,949 ft)
- Prominence: 190 m (620 ft)
- Parent peak: Glogghüs
- Coordinates: 46°46′10″N 8°12′24″E

Geography
- Location within Switzerland
- Location: Obwalden/Bern, Switzerland
- Parent range: Urner Alps

The Chingstuel is a mountain of the Urner Alps, located on the border between the cantons of Obwalden and Bern. It lies between the Klein Melchtal and the region of Hasliberg.
