= Sarner Aa =

River in Switzerland

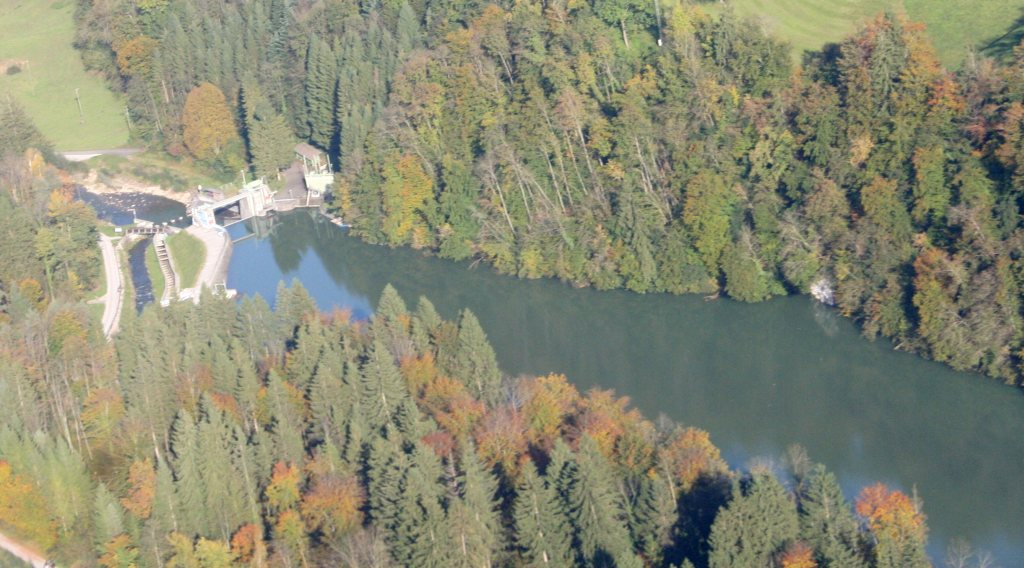

Location
- Country: Switzerland

Physical characteristics
- Source: near Brünig Pass
  - coordinates: 46°47′01″N 8°05′53″E
- Mouth: Lake Lucerne
  - coordinates: 46.9516°N 8.2951°E
- Length: 28 km (17 mi)

Basin features
- Progression: Lake Lucerne→ Reuss→ Aare→ Rhine→ North Sea

The Sarner Aa is a 28 km (17 mi) long river in the Swiss canton of Obwalden. It drains the area to the eastern side of the Brünig Pass, flowing through the Lake Lungern, Lake Sarnen and the Wichelsee, before entering Lake Lucerne near Alpnach. It goes by several names over its length, being known as the Lauibach upstream of the Lungerersee, and the Aa or Aawasser between the Lungerersee and Lake Sarnen.

Along its length, the Sarner Aa flows through or near the settlements of Lungern, Giswil, Sachseln, Sarnen, Kerns and Alpnach.

The Brünig railway line follows the valley of the Sarner Aa in its descent from the Brünig Pass towards Lucerne.

== See also ==
- List of rivers of Switzerland
