= Wichelsee =

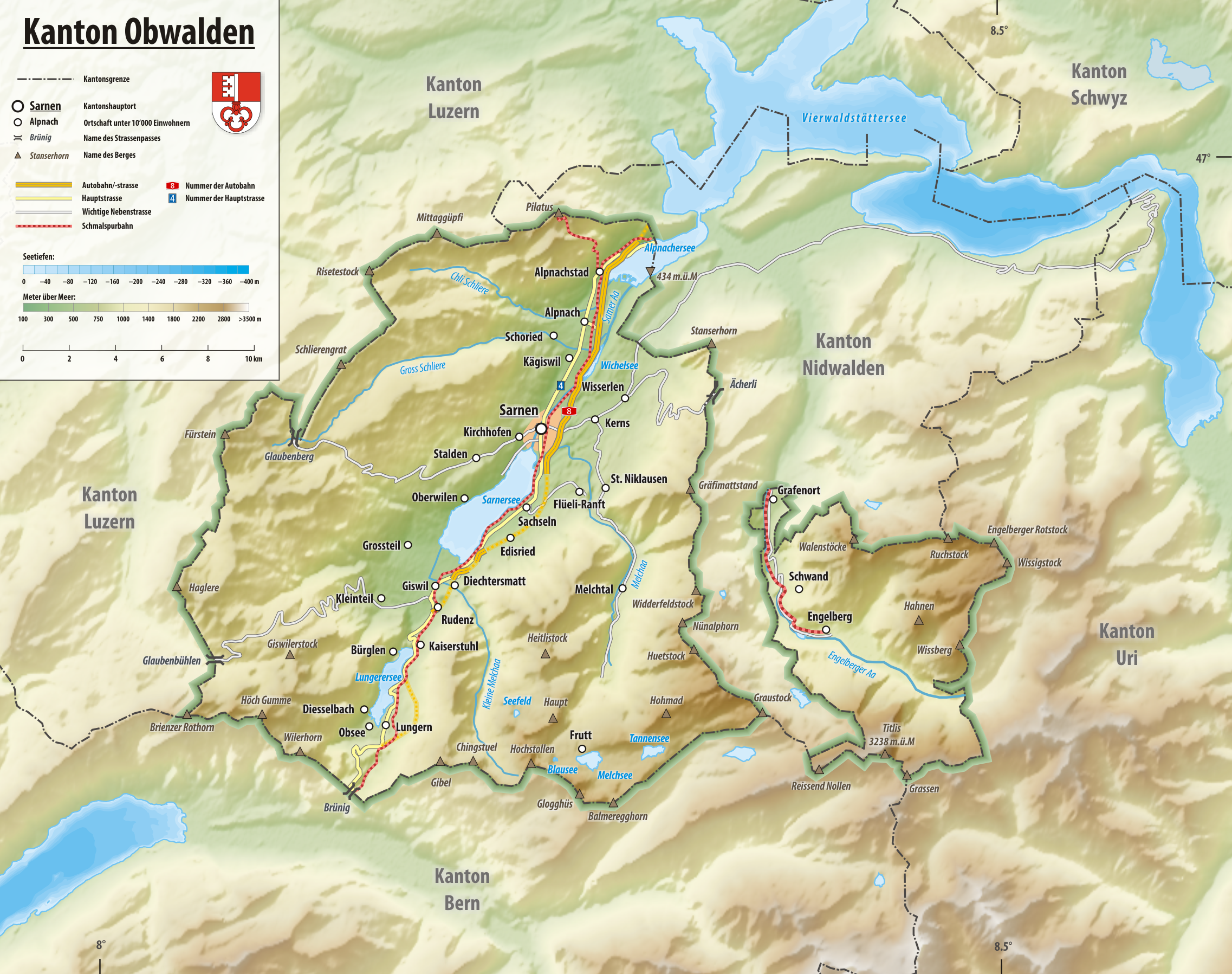
- Location within Canton of Obwalden Location within Canton of Bern Location within Switzerland Location within Alps
- Interactive map of Wichelsee
- Location: Obwalden
- Coordinates: 46°55′10″N 8°16′21″E
- Type: reservoir
- Basin countries: Switzerland
- Surface area: 22 ha (54 acres)
- Water volume: 0.4 million cubic metres (320 acre⋅ft)
- Surface elevation: 459 m (1,506 ft)

Wichelsee is a lake in Obwalden, Switzerland. Its surface area is 22 ha (54 acres). The reservoir is located in the municipalities of Alpnach and Sarnen. It formed after the Sarner Aa was dammed in 1955. The area around the lake was protected in 2005.
