= Cantonal Council of Obwalden =

Legislature of the canton of Obwalden, Switzerland

Cantonal Council of Obwalden Kantonsrat des Kantons Obwalden

Type
- Type: Unicameral

Leadership
- President: Hubert Schumacher, SVP

Structure
- Seats: 55
- Political groups: Centre/GLP (21): CVP - The Centre (19); GLP (2); SVP (13) FDP (11) SP (6) CSP Obwalden (4)

Elections
- Last election: 1 July 2022
- Next election: 2026

The Cantonal Council of Obwalden (German: Obwalden Kantonsrat) is the legislature of the canton of Obwalden, in Switzerland. Obwalden has a unicameral legislature. The Cantonal Council has 55 seats, with members elected every four years.

At the 7 March 2010 election, The center maintained its dominance of the Cantonal Council. The Christian Democrats lost three seats but remained the largest party with 20. The Swiss People's Party gained five seats to become the second largest party, while the FDP.The Liberals retained 10 seats but dropped to the third largest. The Social Democratic Party remained steady with 6 seats and the Christian Social Party lost two seats to have 8.

Summary of the 7 March 2010 Obwalden Cantonal Council election results
Party	Ideology	Vote %	Vote % ±	Seats	Seats ±
Christian Democratic People's Party	Christian democracy	33.82	–1.2	20	-3
Social Democratic Party	Social democracy	21.92	–0.9	11	+5
FDP.The Liberals	Classical liberalism	17.91	+1.9	10	±0
Swiss People's Party	National conservatism	10.95	-1.05	6	±0
Christian Social Party	Christian democracy	15.41	+1.4	8	-2
Total		100.00	–	55	–
Source: Canton of Obwalden
