= Lake Sarnen =

Lake in Switzerland

- Sarnersee (German)
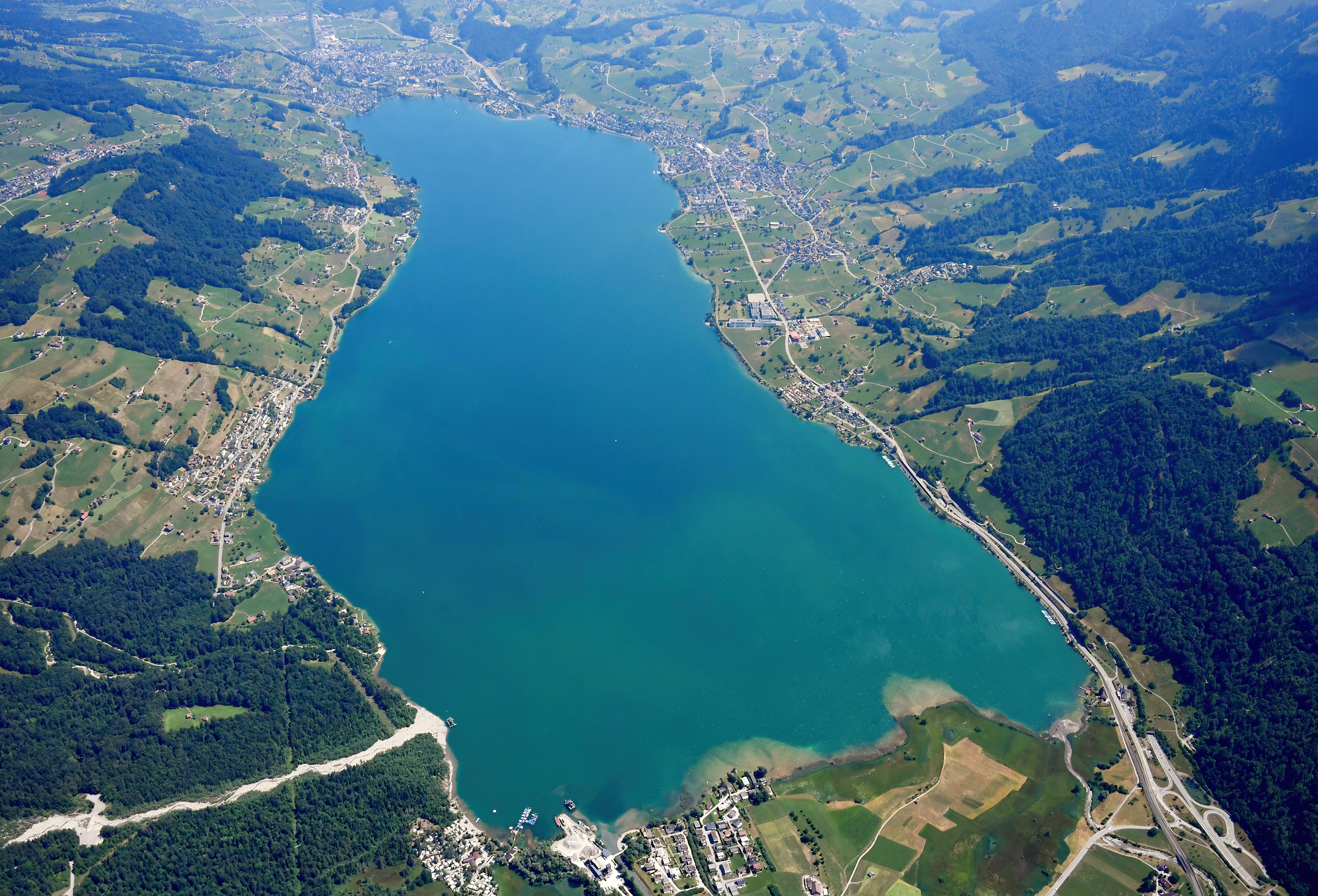

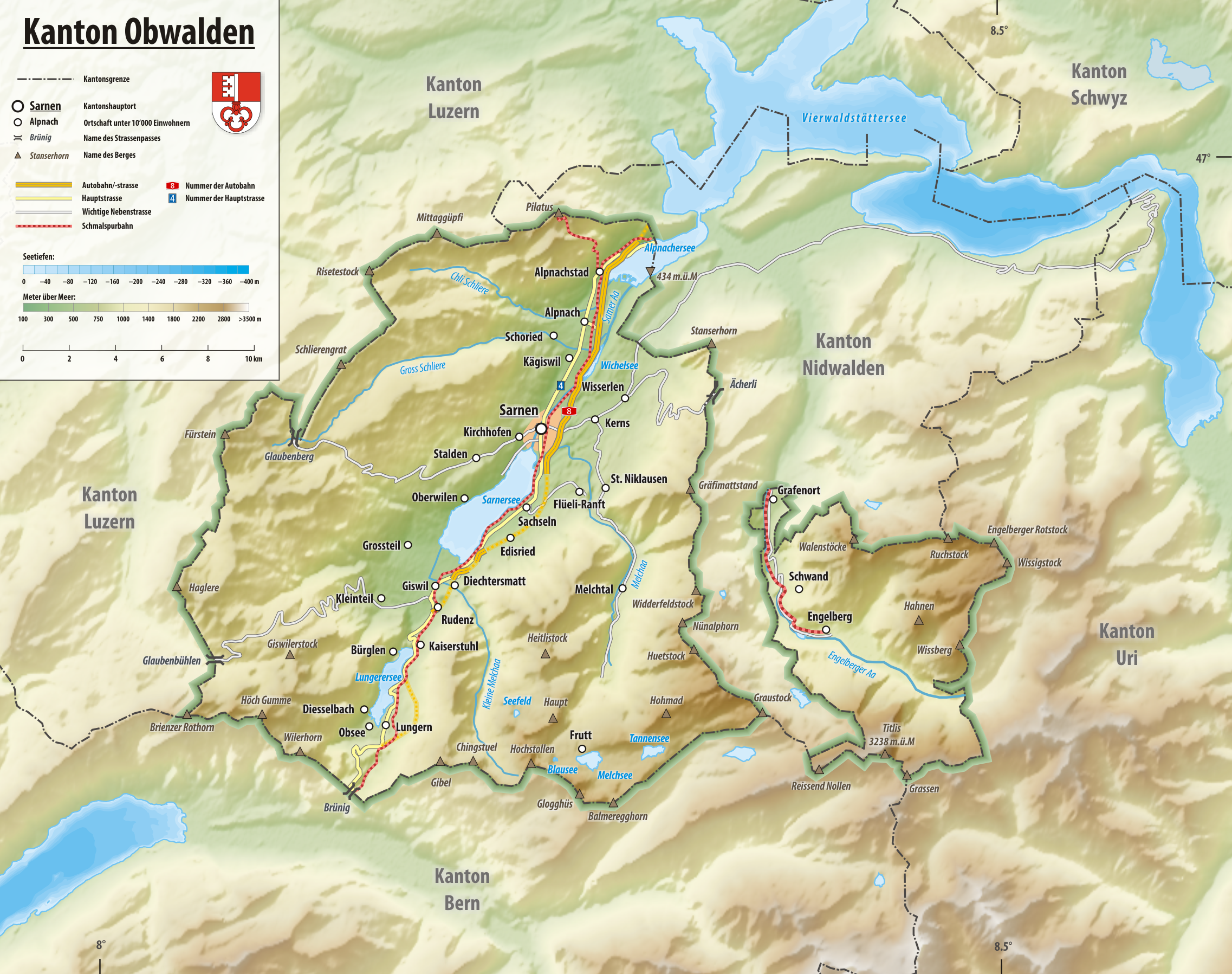
- Location within Canton of Obwalden Location within Canton of Bern Location within Switzerland Location within Alps
- Interactive map of Lake Sarnen
- Location: Obwalden
- Coordinates: 46°51′45″N 8°12′31″E
- Primary inflows: Aa, Grosse Melchaa, Dreiwässerkanal
- Primary outflows: Sarner Aa
- Basin countries: Switzerland
- Max. length: 5.7 km (3.5 mi)
- Max. width: 1.6 km (0.99 mi)
- Surface area: 7.5 km^{2} (2.9 sq mi)
- Average depth: 31 m (102 ft)
- Max. depth: 51 m (167 ft)
- Water volume: 0.239 cubic kilometres (194,000 acre⋅ft)
- Residence time: 0.8 years
- Surface elevation: 469 m (1,539 ft)
- Settlements: Sarnen, Sachseln

Lake Sarnen (German: Sarnersee) is a lake in the Swiss canton of Obwalden. The lake is on the Sarner Aa, which flows out of the Lake Lungern, through the Lake Sarnen, and into Lake Lucerne. The municipalities of Sarnen and Sachseln are located on the shores of the lake, and the Brünig railway line follows the eastern shore.

The lake's area is about 7.5 km^{2} (2.9 sq mi) and its maximum depth is 51 m. It is about 5.7 km (3.5 mi) long and, at its widest, 1.6 km (0.99 mi) wide.

The lake is the subject of a watercolour painting by J. M. W. Turner, The Sarner See, Evening, c. 1842.

== See also ==
- List of lakes of Switzerland
