= Lake Lungern =

Lake in Obwalden, Switzerland

- Lungerersee; Lungernsee; Lac de Lungern
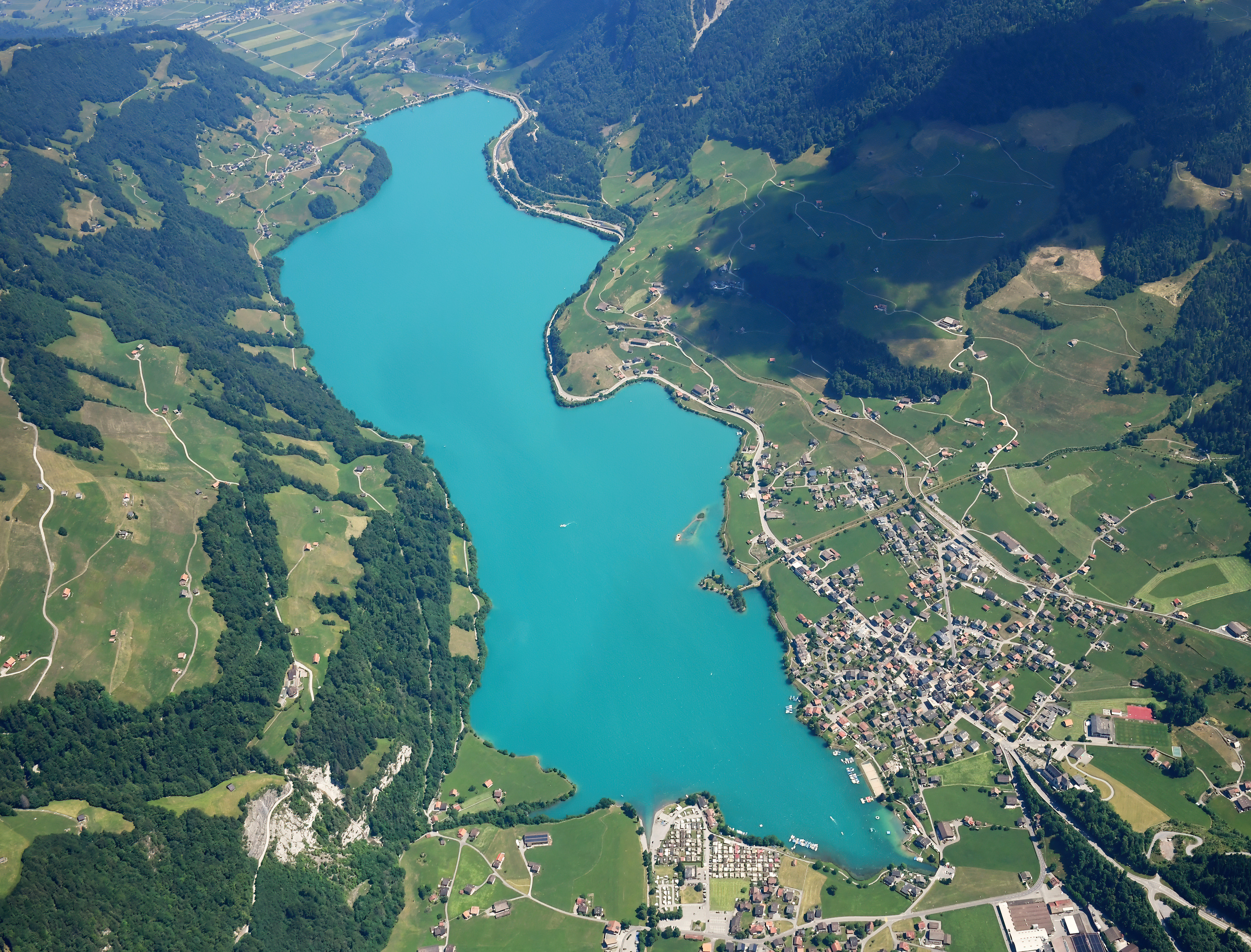

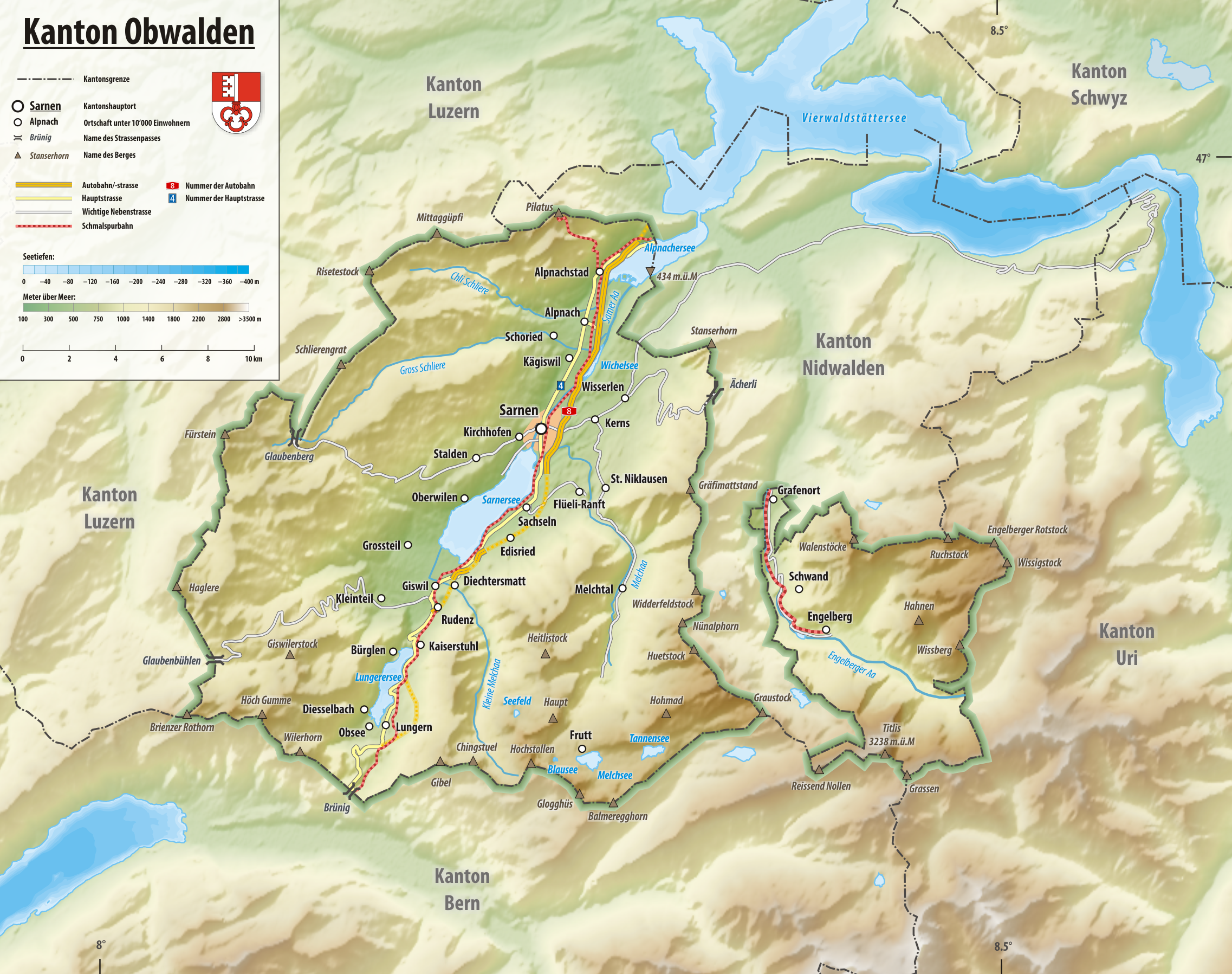
- Location within Canton of Obwalden Location within Canton of Bern Location within Switzerland Location within Alps
- Interactive map of Lake Lungern
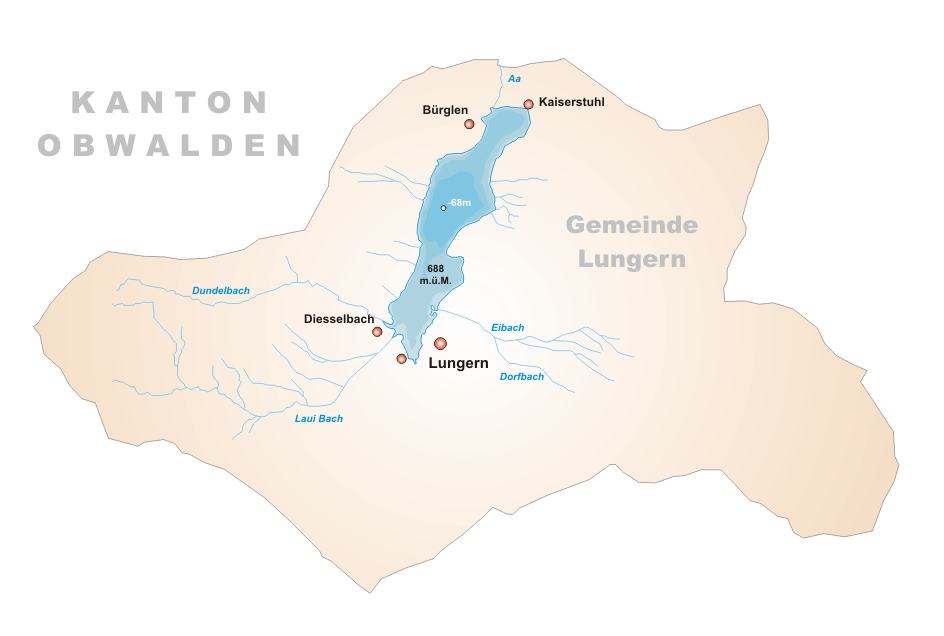
- Map
- Location: Obwalden
- Coordinates: 46°48′9″N 8°9′48″E
- Primary inflows: Lauibach, Eibach
- Primary outflows: Sarner Aa
- Basin countries: Switzerland
- Max. length: 2 km (1.2 mi)
- Max. width: 200–800 m (660–2,620 ft)
- Surface area: 2.01 km^{2} (0.78 mi^{2}; 201 ha; 500 acres)
- Max. depth: 68 m (223 ft)
- Surface elevation: 688 m (2,257 ft)
- Settlements: Lungern

Lake Lungern (German: Lungerersee, also spelled Lungernsee or Lungerensee) is a natural lake in Obwalden, Switzerland which is named after the town Lungern on its shore. The lake is drained by the Sarner Aa river, which flows through the Sarnersee and into Lake Lucerne.

The lake was originally much larger, and covered a large part of the valley it is situated in. Starting in 1836, its level was lowered by 36 metres (118 ft) through an artificial drainage tunnel with a length of 380 metres (1,250 ft). It is used as a reservoir.

== See also ==
- List of lakes of Switzerland
