= Obwalden =

Canton of Switzerland

Canton of Obwalden Kanton Obwalden (German) Canton of Obwald
- Canton
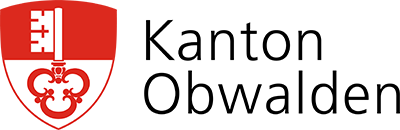
- Flag Coat of arms Logo

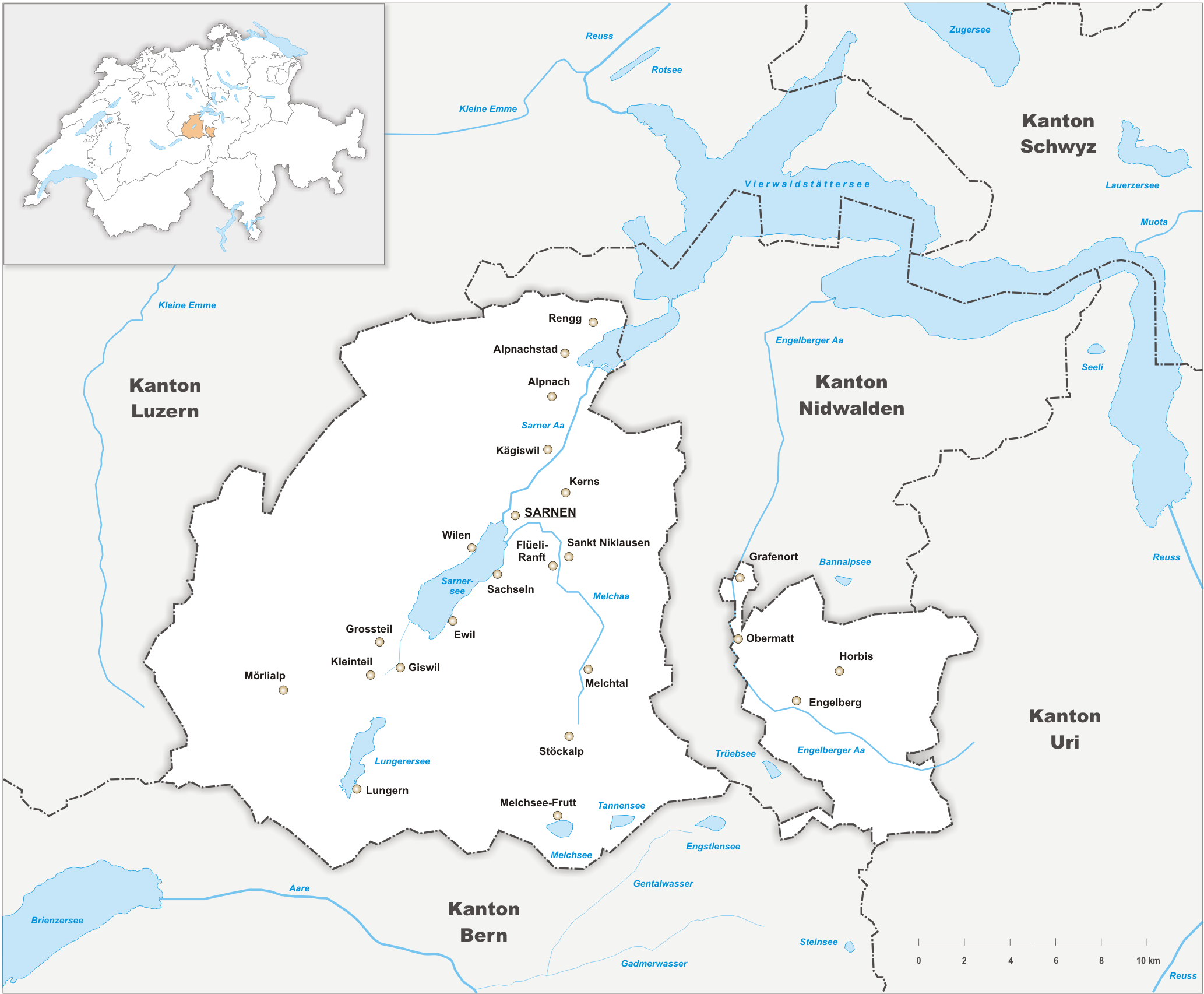
- Location in Switzerland Map of Obwalden
- Coordinates: 46°52′N 8°2′E
- Capital: Sarnen
- Subdivisions: 7 municipalities

Government
  - President: Christian Schäli
  - Executive: Regierungsrat (5)
  - Legislative: Kantonsrat (55)

Area
  - Total: 490.58 km^{2} (189.41 sq mi)

Population (December 2020)
  - Total: 38,108
  - Density: 77.679/km^{2} (201.19/sq mi)

GDP
  - Total: CHF 2.564 billion (2020)
  - Per capita: CHF 67,453 (2020)
- ISO 3166 code: CH-OW
- Highest point: 3,238 m (10,623 ft): Titlis
- Lowest point: 434 m (1,424 ft): Lake Lucerne
- Joined: 1291
- Languages: German
- Website: www.ow.ch

Canton of Obwalden or Obwald (German: Kanton Obwalden [ˈɔpˌvaldn̩]; Romansh: Chantun Sursilvania; French: Canton d'Obwald; Italian: Canton Obvaldo) is one of the 26 cantons forming the Swiss Confederation. It is composed of seven municipalities and the seat of the government and parliament is in Sarnen. It is traditionally considered a "half-canton", the other half being Nidwalden.

Obwalden lies in Central Switzerland and contains the geographical centre of Switzerland. It is bordered by the canton of Lucerne to the north, the canton of Nidwalden and Uri to the east and the canton of Bern to the south. The canton is essentially in the valley of the Sarner Aa south of Lake Lucerne, with an exclave around Engelberg.

It is one of the smallest cantons. The largest town is Sarnen, followed by Kerns and Alpnach.

Together with Nidwalden, Obwalden was part of the forest canton of Unterwalden, one of the three participants in the foundation of the Old Swiss Confederacy, named in the Pact of Brunnen of 1315 with Uri and Schwyz. The division of Unterwalden into two separate territories, Nidwalden and Obwalden, appears to have developed over the course of the 14th and 15th centuries.

== History ==
Obwalden is one of the two valleys, along with Nidwalden, that make up Unterwalden. Throughout its history, the political situation and the extent of its independence have varied widely. Between 1291 and 1309, Unterwalden joined the nascent Swiss Confederation. During that time Obwalden was known as Unterwalden ob dem Kernwald and Nidwalden was Unterwalden nit dem Kernwald. Unterwalden's votes in the Tagsatzung were split between the two valleys. Between 1798 and 1803 it became the District of Sarnen in the Canton of Waldstätten. From 1803 until 1999 it was the half-canton of Obwalden. In 1999, the new Federal Constitution eliminated the half-canton designation and made Obwalden a full canton, though they still shared representation in the Council of States and only had half a vote. Due to the complex history of Obwalden there will be some overlap between the histories of Obwalden, Nidwalden, and Unterwalden.

=== Prehistory ===
The earliest archaeological traces in Obwalden is a stone knife from the 8th millennium BC, which was found in Brand by Lungern. Two Horgen culture sites from the 4th millennium BC have been found in the Canton. An ax and two bone blades were found in Giswil and a hammer-ax was found in Wilen. It appears that the valleys in Obwalden were at least temporarily inhabited during this time, but no evidence of agriculture or permanent settlements have been found.

An Early Bronze Age grave in Foribach in Kerns implies that there was a settlement in the surrounding area between 2000 BC and 1700 BC. There may have also been a settlement along the shores of Lake Sarnen during the same period. Between 1500 and 1100 BC there were several other settlements, including houses in the Rengg Pass and high alpine herding camps above the pass. Many of the place names in the canton have Celtic or Gallo-Roman roots.

In 1914-15 a Roman estate was unearthed in Alpnach. The estate was built in the late 1st century AD and remained in operation until a fire destroyed the main building in 270.

Around 700, the Alamanni began to migrate into Obwalden. They initially settled around the lakes while the Gallo-Romans lived up on the plateau. The Alamanni influence is noticeable around Lake Sarnen and the Kerns plateau where many place name end in -ingen, -wil and -hofen. The Gallo-Romans remained around Mt. Pilatus, the Giswilerstock and in the Melch valley. During the 8th to 11th centuries, the two populations intermarried and eventually all became Germanized. By the 9th century it was part of the Second Kingdom of Burgundy. It became part of the Holy Roman Empire following the winter military campaign of 1032-33 by Emperor Conrad II. Obwalden was given to the Counts of Lenzburg from Aargau. The counts built a castle on Landenberg hill to help them control the land.

=== Early middle ages ===
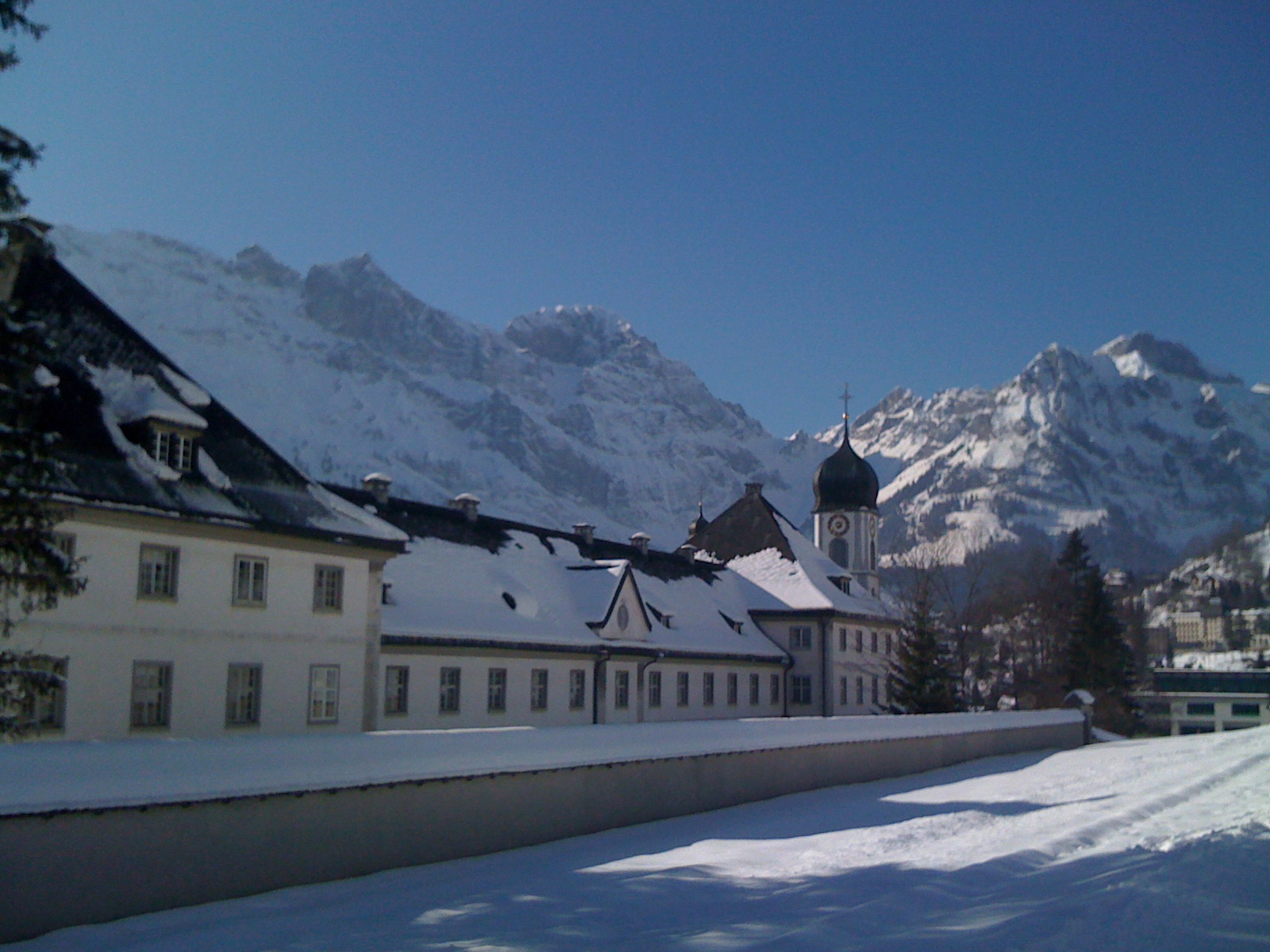
Engelberg Abbey was a major power and controlled the parishes in Obwalden

During the Early Middle Ages, much of the land in Obwalden was controlled by monasteries (especially Murbach-Lucerne and Beromünster Abbey). The monasteries began to spread their authority and parishes into Obwalden during this time. St. Peter's Church in Sarnen was first mentioned in 1036, but was built on top of an 8th-century church. St. Mary's Church of Alpnach was probably built in the 8th or 9th century. The churches in Kerns, Sachseln, and Giswil all became parish churches by the 12th century and a church was mentioned in Lungern in 1275. During the 14th century, Engelberg Abbey began to acquire rights over the parishes in Obwalden. By 1415 the Abbey had de facto control over the appointment of parish priests in the entire valley. In 1460, this became de jure authority over all the parishes in the valley.

In the early 12th century the Counts of Lenzburg granted a large part of their lands in Obwalden to their monastery at Beromünster. In 1210 the Lenzburg castle at Landenberg was abandoned. However, in the 13th century, several small castles were built for the minor nobles. The Kellner of Sarnen (Obedientiaries of the main family) lived in the Lower Castle in Sarnen. In Giswil the Lords of Hunwil lived in Hunwil Castle while the Meier of Giswil, a Ministerialis (unfree knights in the service of a feudal overlord) family, lived in Rosenberg Castle. In Lungern, the Lords of Vittringen had a castle.

The political community of Sarnen (de Sarnon locorum homines) were first mentioned in a Papal bull in 1247, when they and the citizens of Schwyz were excommunicated for supporting Frederick II against their ruler, Rudolf of Habsburg-Laufenburg. In 1257, the Habsburgs had to grant their landlord rights in Obwalden to several of their vassals, all minor nobles. During the 13th century, Obwalden was home to a unified local political organization with enough autonomy to act against the best interests of their nominal rulers. The nobility in the canton were all minor nobles with limited power. This changed on 16 April 1291 when Rudolph I of Habsburg bought the Unterwalden (containing both Obwalden and Nidwalden) from Murbach Abbey. This made him the chief landowner, the count, and the emperor over the valley. Fearing a loss of their freedoms, on the 1 August 1291 Nidwalden (Obwalden is not named in the text of the document, though it is named on the seal appended to it) formed the Eternal Alliance with Uri and Schwyz. This alliance is considered the beginning of the Swiss Confederation and modern Switzerland.

=== The Old Swiss Confederation ===
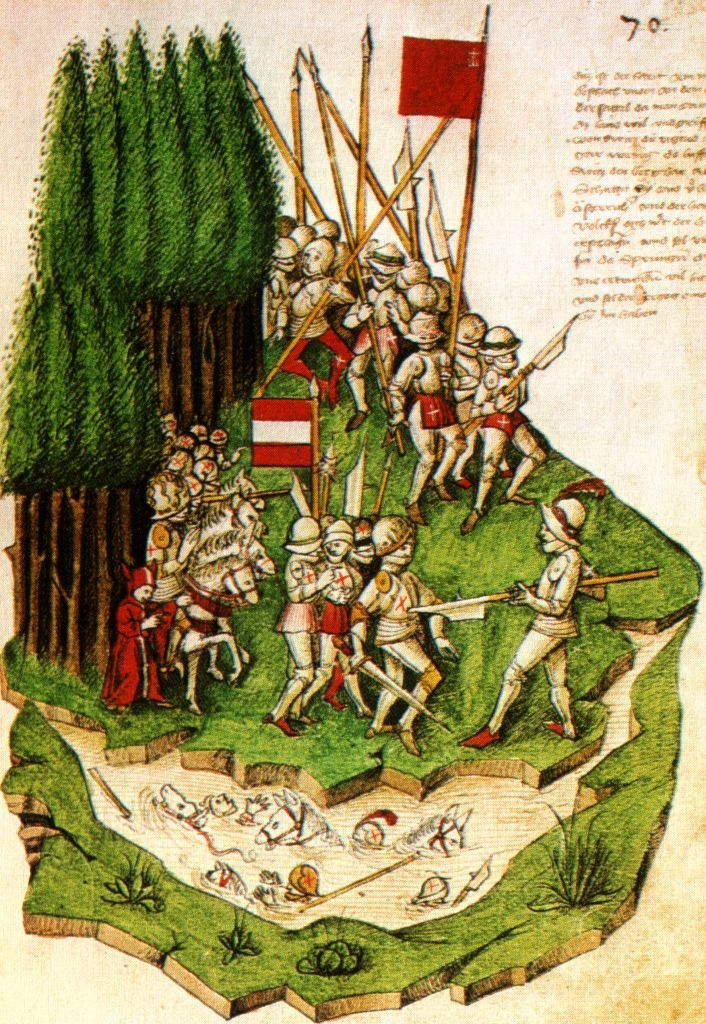
Battle of Morgarten from the Tschachtlanchronik of 1470

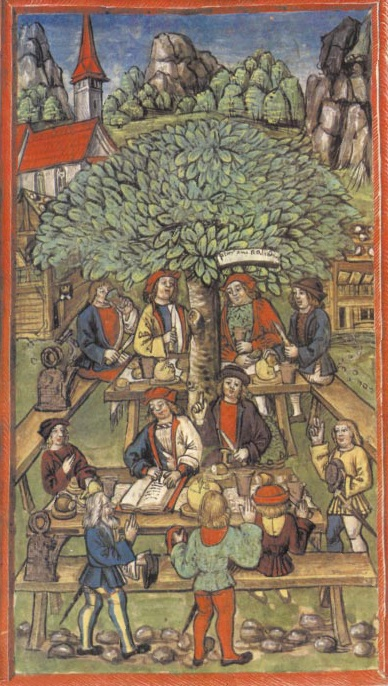
The Amstalden Affair. The picture shows in the back, under the tree, Peter Amstalden in a conspiratorial meeting to rebel against Lucerne with the support of Obwalden.

Initially, the Eternal Alliance was a mutual defense pact between the three cantons, each of which was independently ruled. In 1304 the two valleys of Obwalden and Nidwalden were joined together under the same local deputy of the count. In 1309 Emperor Henry VII confirmed to Unterwalden all the liberties granted by his predecessor, though the exact terms are unknown. The Emperor also granted the valleys imperial immediacy which placed Unterwalden on an equal political footing with Uri and Schwyz.

In 1314, Duke Louis IV of Bavaria (who would become Louis IV, Holy Roman Emperor) and Frederick the Handsome, a Habsburg prince, each claimed the crown of the Holy Roman Emperor. The Confederates supported Louis IV because they feared the Habsburgs would annex their countries as Habsburg property. War broke out over a dispute between the Confederates of Schwyz and the Habsburg-protected monastery of Einsiedeln regarding some pastures, and eventually, the Confederates of Schwyz conducted a raid on the monastery.

In support of their allies, Unterwalden joined the Confederates in the Battle of Morgarten and drove back an invasion of the Brünig Pass. After the decisive Confederation victory over the Habsburgs, Unterwalden renewed the Eternal Alliance in the Pact of Brunnen. During the 14th century, the communities in Obwalden grew increasingly powerful at the expense of the nobility. The formerly powerful Kellner of Sarnen family retired from politics after 1307. The White Book of Sarnen mentions the conquest of the Lower Castle in Sarnen, the home of the family, which may explain why they left politics. The Strättligen and Ringgenberg families married into the Lords of Hunwil and used the power of the dynastic marriages to reduce Habsburg power to a vague suzerainty in the 1330s and 40s, though the Habsburg still owned some land in Obwalden. During the early 14th century, an organization of livestock farmers developed in the Hunwil lands. Throughout the century, their political power grew as they acquired more land and grew wealthy. The organization eventually became an alternative political structure and following conflicts between the organization and the Hunwil nobles, in 1382 the Landsgemeinde excluded the Hunwils from holding political or court offices. During the 13th and 14th century Obwalden established its own local governance, despite having had a joint assembly with Nidwalden up to around 1330.

During the 14th century, Obwalden participated in several other wars with the Swiss Confederation, including the Battle of Sempach in 1386 and the Gugler war in 1375. It peacefully acquired Alpnach in 1368 and Hergiswil in 1378. In 1403 Obwalden joined Uri to invade the Leventina area (today located in the canton of Ticino) to establish new markets for cheese and cattle. They conquered the Val d' Ossola in 1410. In 1419 the Confederation bought Bellinzona. Milan attacked the city three years later in 1422 after an offer to buy Bellinzona was rejected by the Swiss Confederation. The troops from Uri and Obwalden were quickly driven from the city and later defeated at the Battle of Arbedo on 30 June 1422. This defeat drove the Confederates out of Bellinzona and the Val d' Ossola and Leventina. An attempt to pull the Entlebuch region away from Lucerne ended with the Obwalden supported Entlebuch leader Peter Amstalden arrested, tried and executed in 1478. In 1500, Nidwalden, Schwyz, and Uri conquered Ticino again and ruled until 1798. While Obwalden participated in the conquests of Aargau (1415), Thurgau (1460), and Locarno, (1512), and in the temporary occupation of the Val d' Ossola (1410–14, 1416–22, 1425–26, 1512–15) it was never able to incorporate any captured territory or grow.

During the Burgundian Wars (1474–77) Unterwalden, like the other Forest cantons, hung back through jealousy of Bern, but came to the rescue in time of need. Following the Swiss victories in the Burgundian Wars the Old Swiss Confederation was nearly torn apart by internal conflict when the city cantons insisted on having the lion's share of the proceeds since they had supplied the most troops. The country cantons resented this and the Tagsatzung or leadership of each of the cantons met in Stans in Nidwalden in 1481 to resolve the issues. However, they were unable to resolve the issues and war seemed inevitable. A local hermit, Niklaus von der Flüe from Obwalden, was consulted on the situation. According to legend he requested that a message be passed on to the members of the Tagsatzung on his behalf. The details of the message have remained unknown to this day, however, it did calm the tempers and led to the drawing up of the Stanser Verkommnis. As part of the Verkommnis Fribourg and Solothurn were admitted into the confederation.

=== The Reformation ===
The Landsgemeinde of Obwalden stood firmly against the Protestant Reformation. When attempts to resolve the conflicts between the Protestant and Catholic cantons in the Tagsatzung and during the disputation of Baden (1526) were unsuccessful, Obwalden adopted an aggressively pro-Catholic stance. In 1528, they sent troops over the Brünig Pass to try to force the Bernese Oberhasli region to hold the old faith. The Obwalden invasion and the Bernese response, which drove them out of Bern, were part of the general unrest leading to the First War of Kappel in 1529. While the First War of Kappel ended in a peace treaty without loss of life, two years later the Second War of Kappel ended in the death of reformer Huldrych Zwingli and a victory for the Catholic side. However, since about half of the Confederation remained Protestant, the Catholic cantons began to make alliances with neighbouring Catholic leaders including France and Spain. Most of the leading political families in Obwalden became pro-French.

=== Under the Helvetic Republic ===
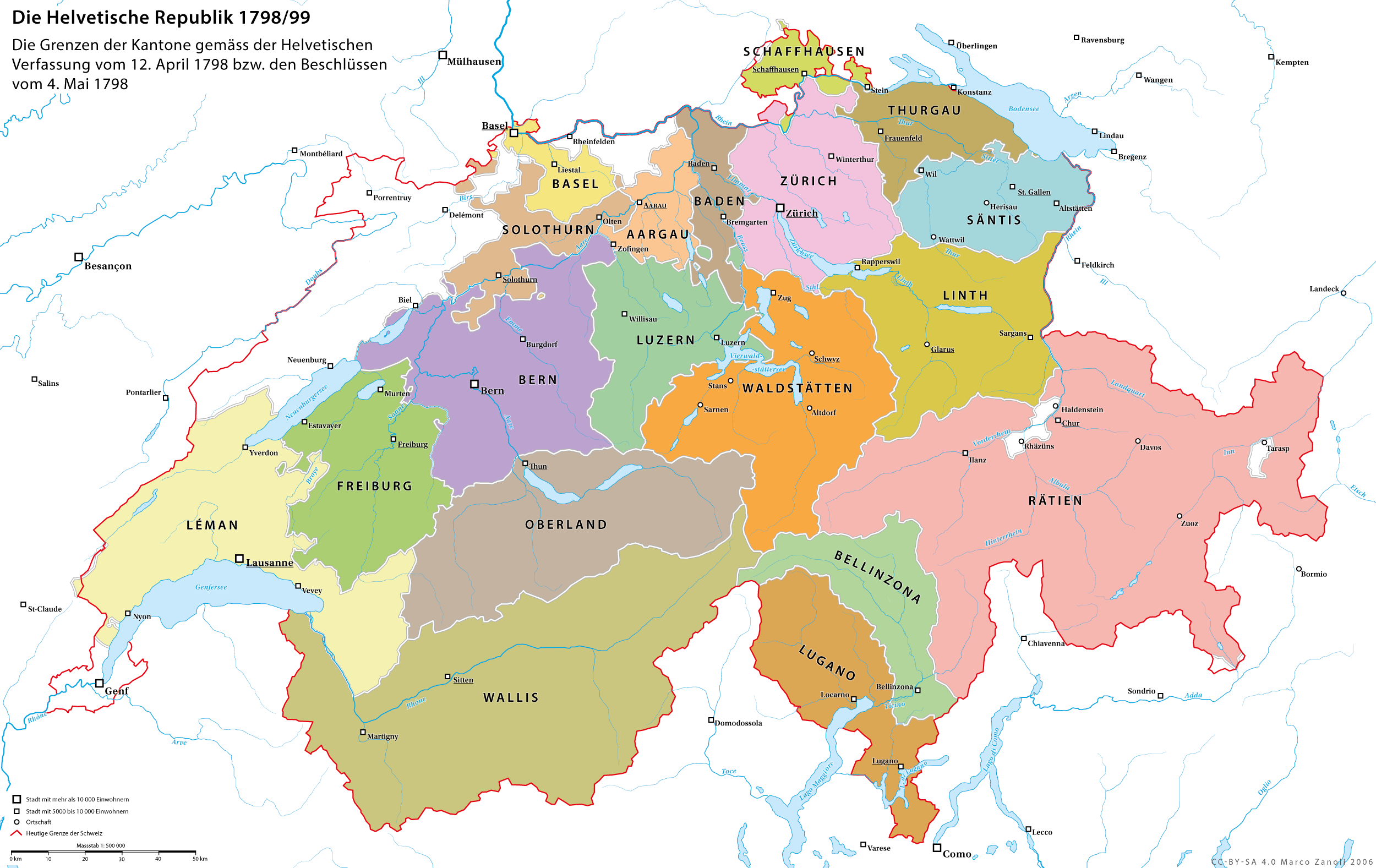
The Helvetic Republic in 1798/99 with the short-lived Canton of Waldstätten

During the 1798 French invasion, Obwalden still had a strongly pro-French government. The von Flüe had grown wealthy and politically powerful in mercenary service in France. The clergy saw France still as supporters of the Catholic Church. On 1 April 1798, Obwalden became the first of the original Swiss cantons to accept the Helvetic Republic. However, it was then forced by its neighbors to reject the new Republic and resist the French. When the French armies crushed the rebellion, the old Forest Cantons were merged into the single Canton of Waldstätten. Obwalden became the district of Sarnen in this new Canton. The leadership of the new district were supporters of Helvetic Republic and the French army.

After the collapse of the Helvetic Republic, the Act of Mediation of 1803 dissolved Waldstätten and in the 15th section specifically divided Unterwalden into the half-cantons "ob dem Wald" and "nid dem Wald". The leading "Helvetiker" or supporters of the Republic lost the favor of their fellow citizens. However, a large portion of the councilors before 1798 were also civil servants under the Republic and were re-elected by the Landsgemeinde in 1803. While the politicians remained the same, there were several important changes in the half-canton. The major change was that every resident of the canton gained equal rights, where before there had been citizens and resident aliens each with different rights. Other changes included raising the voting age from 14 to 20 and requiring military service at age 20.

=== From the Helvetic Republic to the founding of the Federal State ===
In 1815 the monastery of Engelberg and the municipality of the same name joined Obwalden. The cantonal constitution documents of 19 and 24 November 1815 partially guaranteed the traditional rights of the Abbey and its surrounding community. Then, in 1816, the constitution was altered to include Engelberg as a municipality in the canton. During the Restoration period the government began to roll back many of the reforms of the Helvetic Republic. In the 1830s and 40s, Landammann Nikodem Spichtig began to expand the power of his office. In 1840, a coalition of liberals and radicals gained the majority in the Federal Diet. They introduced a number of reforms and proposed a new constitution that included many radical reforms. In response to this radical government, the Catholic and conservative cantons, including Obwalden, formed the Sonderbund or separate alliance in 1843. When the radicals attempted to dissolve this separate alliance in 1847, they started the Sonderbund War. Though Obwalden participated in the War, the Sonderbund council surrendered before the Federal army reached the Canton.

After the Sonderbund War, the old government was replaced with a liberal government. In response to the wide-ranging powers that Landammann Spichtig had held, the new government eliminated some levels of government and replaced lifetime appointments to Landammann with term limits. Spichtig was seen as having pulled Obwalden into the Sonderbund, and he was driven out of office and politics.

=== Modern Obwalden ===
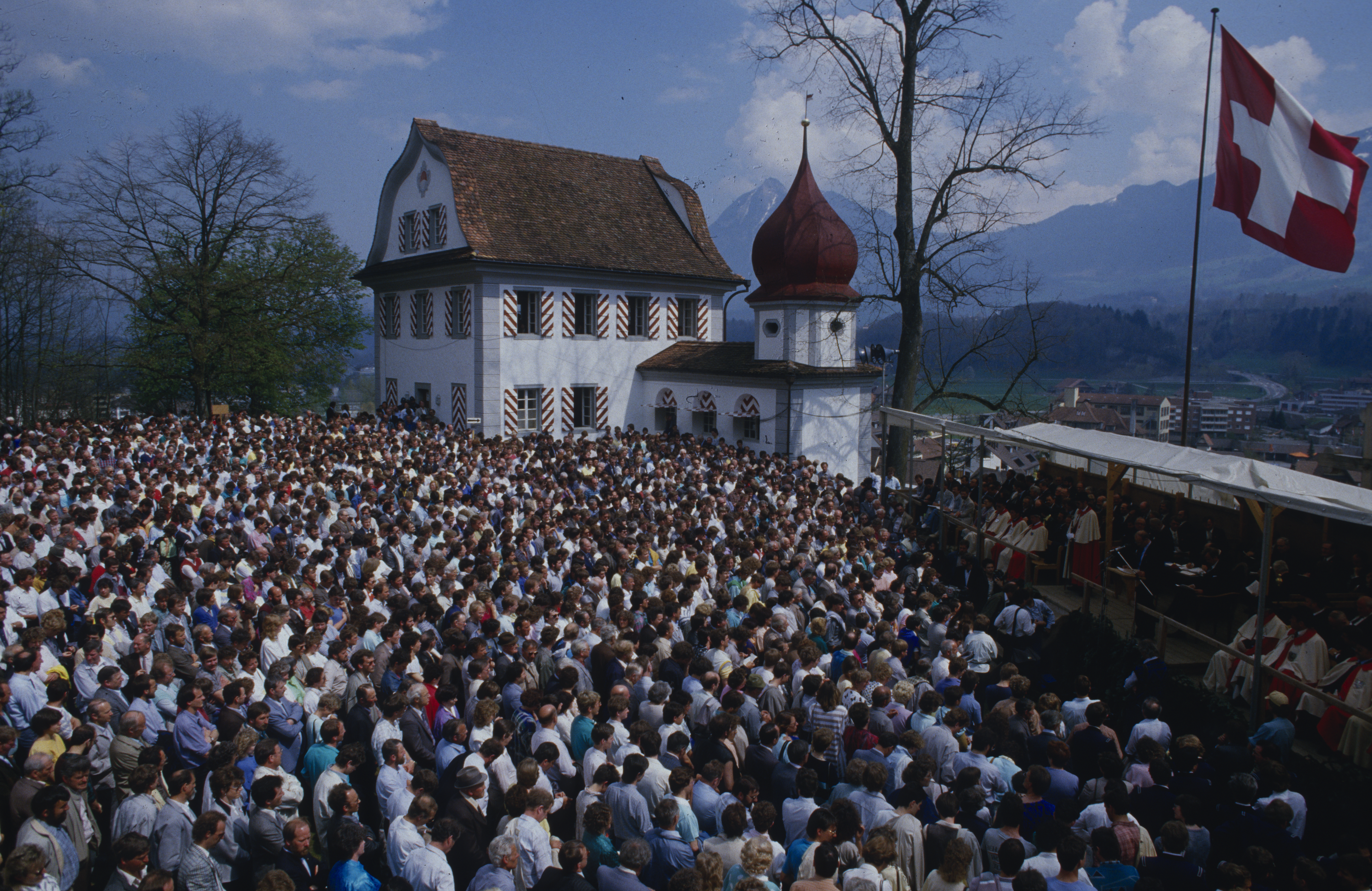
The Landsgemeinde in 1987

In 1850, the Catholic Church was recognized as the only cantonal religion. However, in 1867 the cantonal constitution was completely rewritten. It changed the organization of the government and allowed the Reformed churches some rights, including the right to run their own schools. The 1867 constitution also weakened many of the special privileges that the Landmann held. In 1902 the constitution was rewritten again and it allowed citizens to demand a referendum on any law. In the following years a number of initiatives and referendums were submitted, some of which succeeded. In 1909, an initiative was approved which allowed 1,200 citizens to demand a secret vote on constitutional revisions. In 1922, the power of the Landsgemeinde was weakened further with the introduction of secret ballots on constitutional, legal and tax laws.

The last complete revision of the cantonal constitution was in 1968. This revision addressed a number of small issues and clarified a number of laws, but there were no major changes. In 1972, women were first allowed to vote in cantonal elections and in 1983 the voting age dropped to eighteen. The Landsgemeinde was finally abolished in 1998.

== Geography ==
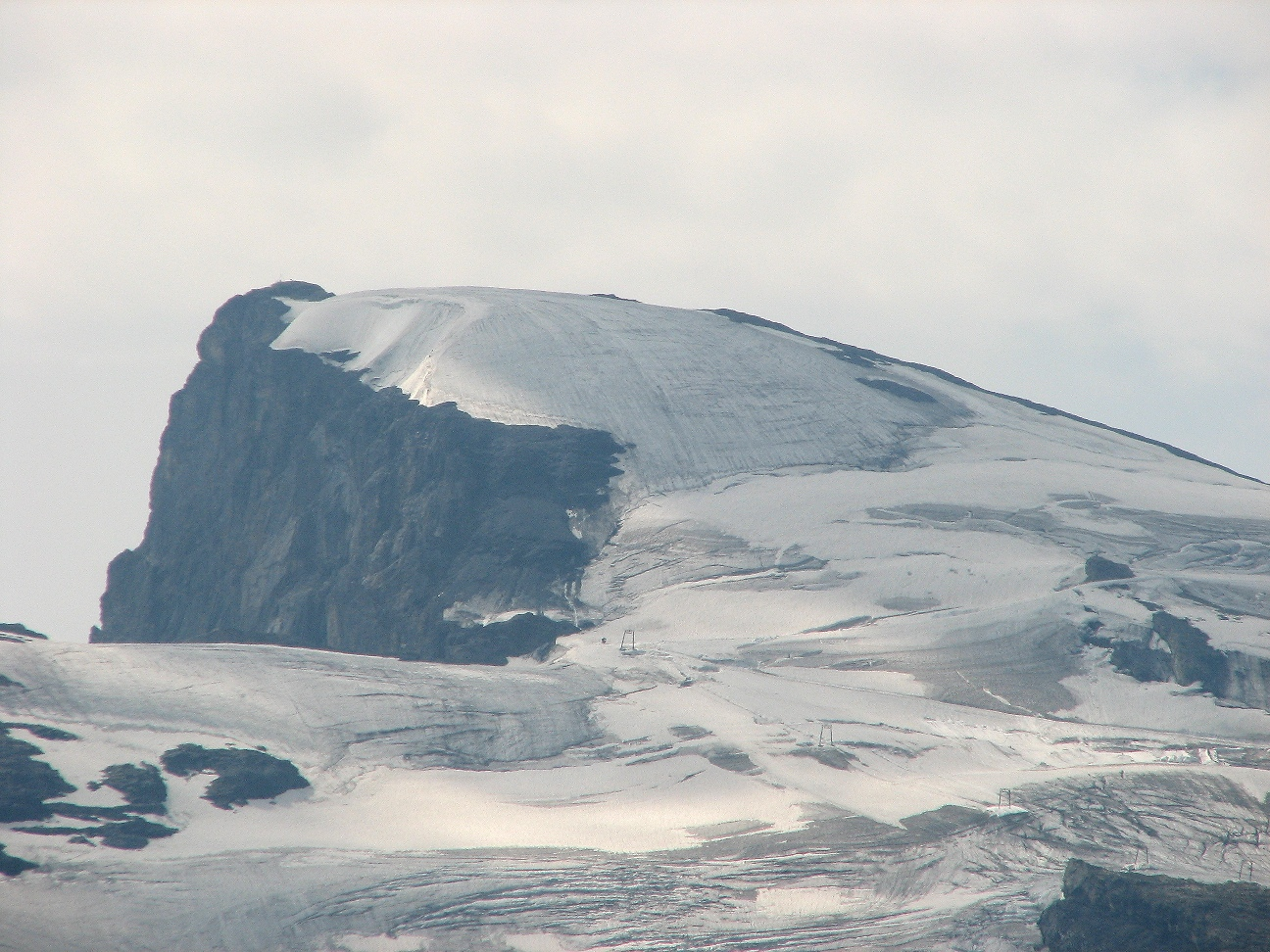
Mt. Titlis Glacier

Highest elevation: Titlis (Urner Alps), 3238 m

Lakes in the canton include: parts of Lake Lucerne (Vierwaldstättersee), Lake Sarnen (Sarnersee), Lake Lungern (Lungerersee), Wichelsee, Tannensee and Melchsee.

The total area of the canton is 490.5 square kilometers (189.4 sq mi). As of 2006, 197.3 km^{2} (76.2 sq mi) or about 40.2% of the canton is wooded. 185.8 km^{2} (71.7 sq mi), or about 37.9% is used in agriculture. Of the rest of the area, 15.8 km^{2} (6.1 sq mi) or 3.2% is developed (structures and roads) and 91.6 km^{2} (35.4 sq mi) or 18.7% is classed as unproductive (rivers, mountains or glaciers).

== Politics ==
Within the Swiss Confederation Obwalden is a half canton. This gives Obwalden all the rights and duties of full cantons, with the exception that the canton can only send one deputy to the Council of States. The small size of the canton allows a small government with only five members.

=== Federal elections ===
In the 2011 federal election the most popular party was the Christian Social Party of Obwalden which received 56.9% of the vote. The other party in the election was the SVP with 43.1%. The CSP OW jumped from having no candidate or votes in 2007 to a majority in 2011.

==== Federal election results ====
Percentage of the total vote per party in the canton in the Federal Elections 1971-2015
Party	Ideology	1971	1975	1979	1983	1987	1991	1995	1999	2003	2007	2011	2015
FDP.The Liberals^{a}	Classical liberalism	32.5	* ^{b}	*	*	30.4	*	*	0.0^{c}	*	*	*	*
CVP/PDC/PPD/PCD	Christian democracy	67.0	97.1	95.7	91.0	51.7	95.3	94.2	0.0^{c}	66.4	32.5	*	*
SP/PS	Social democracy	*	*	*	*	*	*	*	0.0^{c}	*	11.6	*	*
SVP/UDC	Swiss nationalism	*	*	*	*	*	*	*	0.0^{c}	33.6	32.9	43.1	34.5
FPS/PSL	Right-wing populism	*	*	*	*	*	*	3.8	0.0^{c}	*	*	*	*
Other (incl. CSP OW)		0.5	2.9	4.3	9.0	17.8	4.7	2.1	0.0^{c}	0.0	23.0	56.9	65.5
Voter participation %		53.7	21.2	42.3	30.9	50.9	26.7	31.9	0.0^{c}	45.7	59.7	64.3	59.5

^a FDP before 2009, FDP.The Liberals after 2009
^b "*" indicates that the party was not on the ballot in this canton.
^c No election held

=== Cantonal elections ===
Election apportionment, parliament of the canton of Obwalden, Switzerland, 2010

In the Cantonal Council election, on 7 March 2010, the centre maintained its dominance of the Cantonal Council. The Christian Democrats lost three seats, but remained the largest party with 20. The Swiss People's Party gained five seats to become the second largest party, while the FDP.The Liberals retained 10 seats but dropped to the third largest. The Social Democratic Party remained steady with 6 seats and the Christian Social Party of Obwalden lost two seats to have 8.

The evolving party membership in the Kantonsrat is shown in the following chart (for selected dates):

== Demographics ==
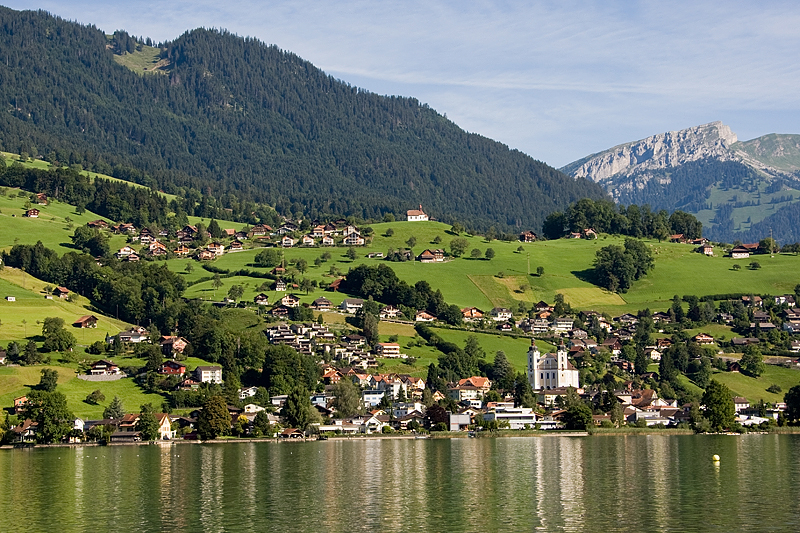
Sarnen town on Lake Sarnen

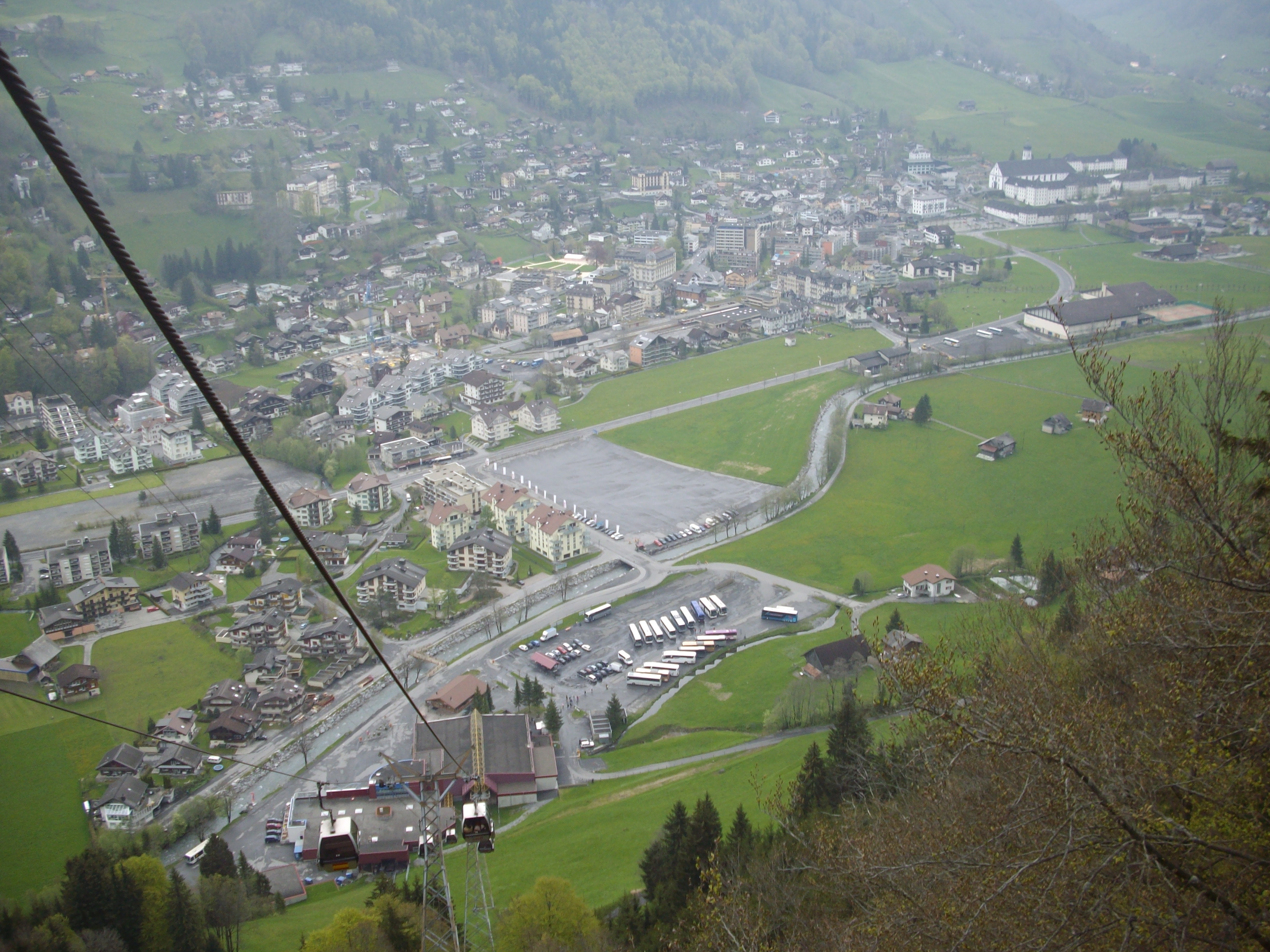
Engelberg town from Mt. Titlis cable car

Obwalden has a population (as of December 2020) of 38,108. As of 2010, 12.9% of the population are resident foreign nationals. Over the last 10 years (2000–2010) the population has changed at a rate of 8.7%. Migration accounted for 5.7%, while births and deaths accounted for 2.5%. Most of the population (as of 2000) speaks German (29,920 or 92.3%) as their first language, Albanian is the second most common (452 or 1.4%) and Serbo-Croatian is the third (399 or 1.2%). There are 144 people who speak French, 329 people who speak Italian and 32 people who speak Romansh.

Of the population in the canton, 14,867 or about 45.8% were born in Obwalden and lived there in 2000. There were 4,374 or 13.5% who were born in the same canton, while 8,228 or 25.4% were born somewhere else in Switzerland, and 4,000 or 12.3% were born outside of Switzerland.

As of 2000, children and teenagers (0–19 years old) make up 26.7% of the population, while adults (20–64 years old) make up 59.3% and seniors (over 64 years old) make up 14.1%.

As of 2000, there were 15,026 people who were single or never married in the canton. There were 14,674 married individuals, 1,691 widows or widowers and 1,036 individuals who are divorced.

As of 2000, there were 12,445 private households in the canton, and an average of 2.5 persons per household. There were 3,835 households that consist of only one person and 1,349 households with five or more people. As of 2009, the construction rate of new housing units was 8.8 new units per 1000 residents. The vacancy rate for the canton, in 2010, was 0.8%.

== Historic population ==
The historic population is given in the following chart:

Historic Population Data
Year	Total Population	Total population change ‰ ^{1}	Rate of natural increase ‰ ^{1}	Net migration rate ‰ ^{1}	% population over 59	German Speaking	Italian Speaking	French Speaking	Romansh Speaking	Other Languages	Roman Catholic	Protestant	Christian Catholic	Other	Other - not member	Other - Islamic	Other - Jewish	Swiss	Resident Foreigner	% resident foreigner
1850	13,799	-2.9‰	-0.7‰	-2.2‰	0.00%						13,783	16						13,779	20	0.10%
1860	13,376	7.7‰	9.1‰	-1.4‰	8.30%															0.70%
1870	14,443	6.3‰	9.5‰	-3.2‰	8.80%															0.80%
1880	15,329	-2.4‰	4.7‰	-7.1‰	10.90%	15,254	88	9	4	1	15,078	277		1			1	15,207	122	0.80%
1888	15,043	1.2‰	6.7‰	-5.5‰	12.00%															3.00%
1900	15,260	11.8‰	11.9‰	-0.1‰	12.50%	14,958	254	33	12	3	15,009	249		2				14,788	472	3.10%
1910	17,161	2.3‰	9.2‰	-6.9‰	11.50%															4.70%
1920	17,567	10.0‰	10.1‰	-0.1‰	9.90%															3.60%
1930	19,401	4.3‰	10.1‰	-5.8‰	10.20%															5.40%
1940	20,340	9.4‰	14.3‰	-4.9‰	12.20%															2.60%
1950	22,125	4.5‰	12.6‰	-8.1‰	12.30%	21,676	239	113	28	69	21,256	827	18	24			6	21,450	675	3.10%
1960	23,135	5.8‰	11.8‰	-6.0‰	13.00%															5.30%
1970	24,509	5.4‰	6.7‰	-1.3‰	16.50%	23,224	773	117	29	366	23,382	1,018	4	105	18	51		22,912	1,597	6.50%
1980	25,865	11.5‰	6.7‰	4.8‰	18.20%															6.80%
1990	29,025	10.8‰	4.4‰	6.4‰	18.10%															8.60%
2000	32,427				18.20%	29,920	329	144	32	2,002	25,992	2,492	14	3,929	1,212	985	5	28,573	3,854	11.90%
a. Average over a 10-year period beginning on the year listed

== Municipalities ==
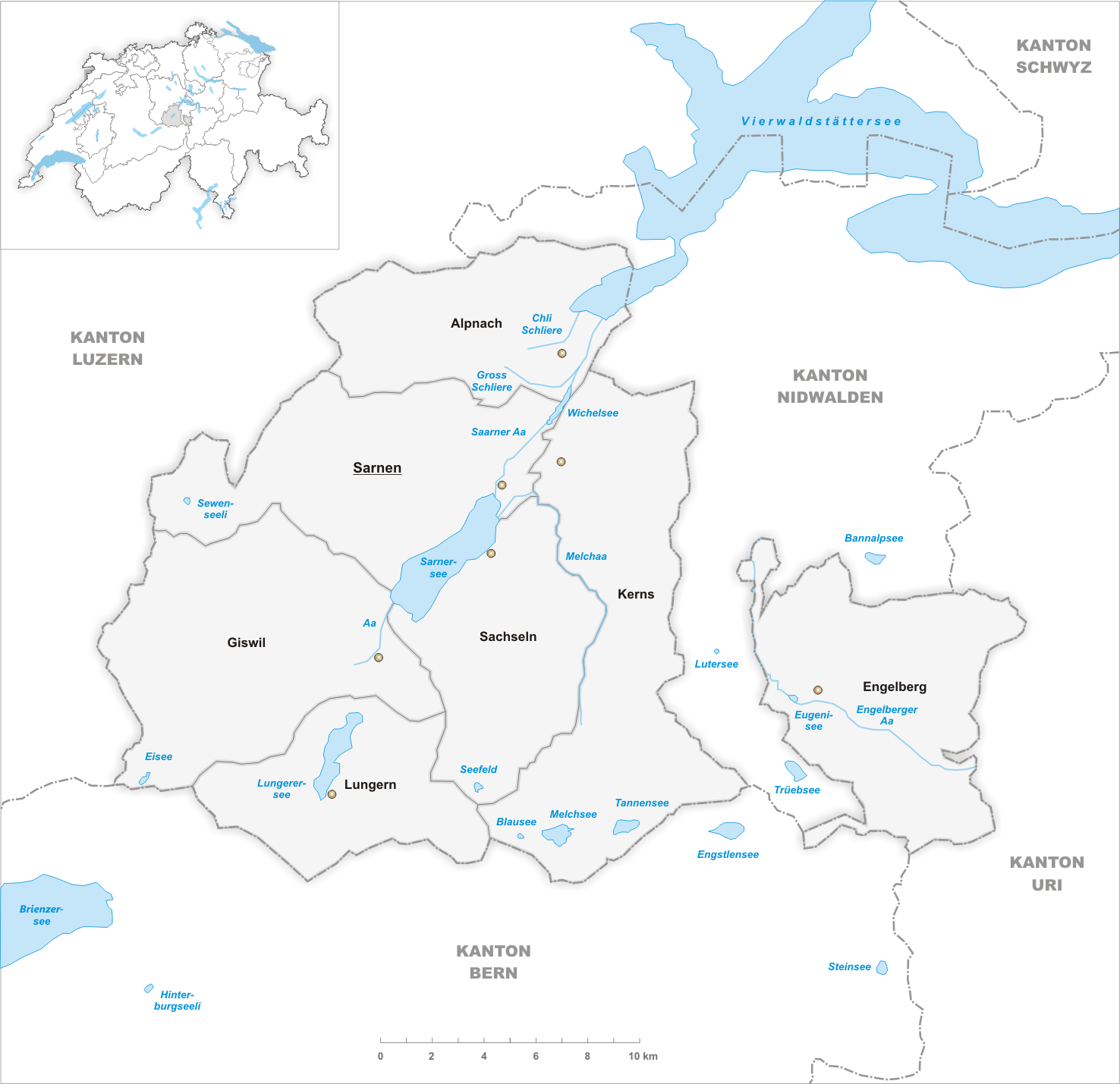
Municipalities of Canton Obwalden

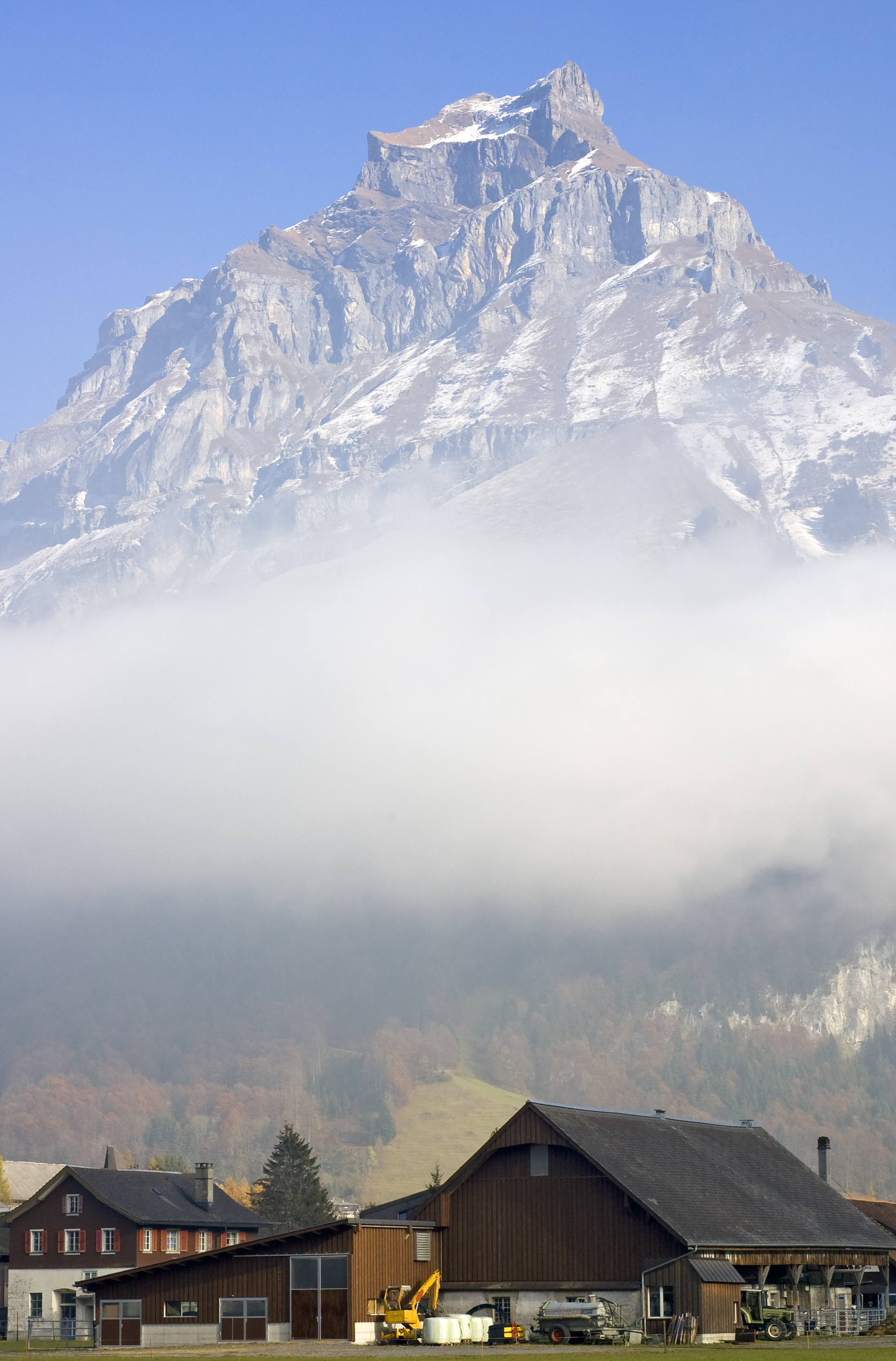
View from Engelberg, to the summit of Hahnen.

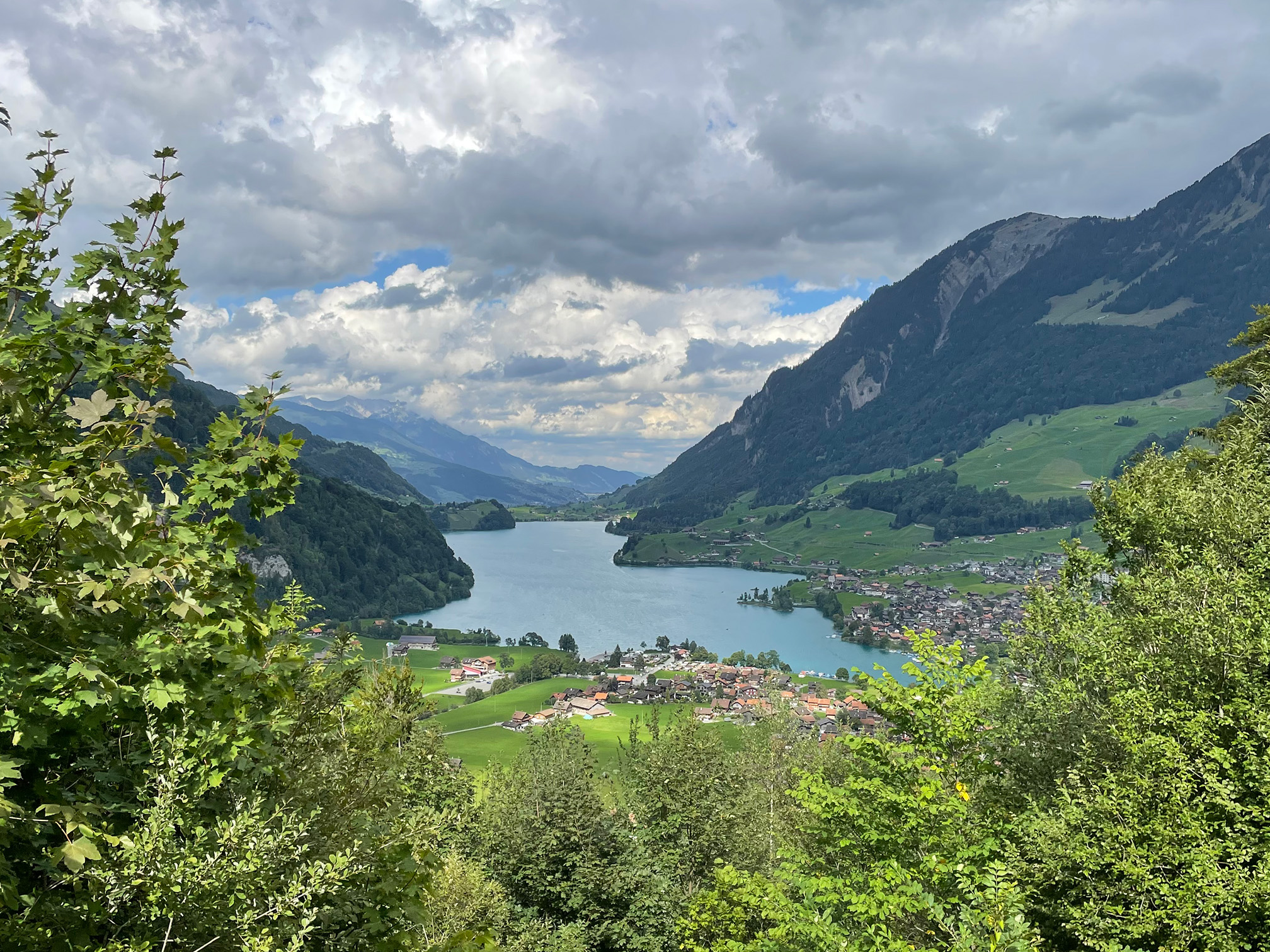
View of Lake Lungern

There are seven municipalities: Sarnen, Kerns, Sachseln, Alpnach, Giswil, Lungern and Engelberg. The capital Sarnen is subdivided into Sarnen-Dorfschaft, Kägiswil, Schwendi/Wilen and Ramersberg. The autonomy of the municipalities in Obwalden is significant. Two thirds of the tax revenue flows to the municipalities, which for example pay for education without grants from the canton.

== Economy ==
Small and middle-sized businesses dominate the economy of Obwalden. Many of them are specialists in areas such as miniature engines, synthetics, medical equipment, or nanotechnology.

Traditional industries are still of great importance. Particularly forestry and related businesses are significant, as is agriculture. Agriculture in Obwalden is specialized in integrated dairy and meat farming. The farms are still family-run.

In 2007 Obwalden replaced the former regressive income tax (lower tax rates for higher incomes) with a flat 1.8% income tax, which is the lowest in the country. This cantonal tax is in addition to federal and local taxes.

As of 2010, Obwalden had an unemployment rate of 1.5%. As of 2008, there were 1,871 people employed in the primary economic sector and about 750 businesses involved in this sector. 6,499 people were employed in the secondary sector and there were 452 businesses in this sector. 10,037 people were employed in the tertiary sector, with 1,380 businesses in this sector.

In 2008 the total number of full-time equivalent jobs was 15,215. The number of jobs in the primary sector was 1,157, of which 1,052 were in agriculture and 105 were in forestry or lumber production. The number of jobs in the secondary sector was 6,008 of which 3,648 or (60.7%) were in manufacturing, 46 or (0.8%) were in mining and 2,139 (35.6%) were in construction. The number of jobs in the tertiary sector was 8,050. In the tertiary sector; 1,892 or 23.5% were in the sale or repair of motor vehicles, 520 or 6.5% were in the movement and storage of goods, 1,440 or 17.9% were in a hotel or restaurant, 140 or 1.7% were in the information industry, 347 or 4.3% were the insurance or financial industry, 708 or 8.8% were technical professionals or scientists, 528 or 6.6% were in education and 1,213 or 15.1% were in health care.

Of the working population, 10.7% used public transportation to get to work, and 54.6% used a private car.

=== Tourism ===
Tourism is a major sector of the economy. The central location in the Swiss Alps meant that Obwalden was able to establish itself as a significant tourist location in the 19th century. Many facilities built for tourism now benefit the local industry and the population. Two of the mountains, namely Pilatus and Titlis, are the main attractions. Winter sports, in particular skiing and snowboarding, attract many tourist. The main resorts are Engelberg, Melchsee-Frutt, Lungern-Schönbüel, Mörlialp and Langis. During the summer, hiking and mountaineering are the main attractions. One-quarter of the population is directly or indirectly employed in the tourism sector.

== Religion ==
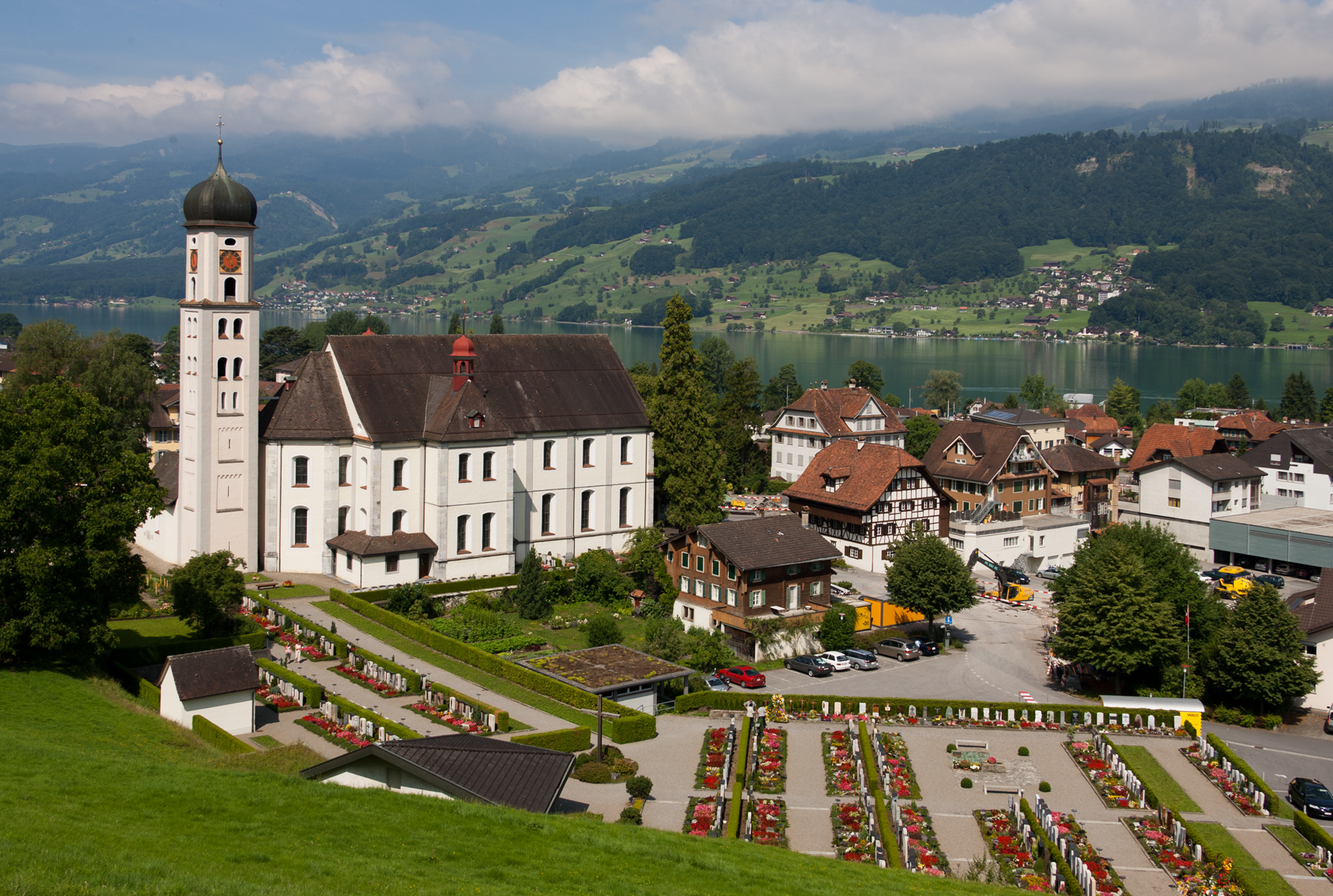
St. Theodul Catholic Church in Sachseln. The majority of the residents of Obwalden are Roman Catholic.

From the 2000 census, 25,992 or 80.2% were Roman Catholic, while 2,255 or 7.0% belonged to the Swiss Reformed Church. Of the rest of the population, there were 464 members of an Orthodox church (or about 1.43% of the population), there were 14 individuals (or about 0.04% of the population) who belonged to the Christian Catholic Church, and there were 497 individuals (or about 1.53% of the population) who belonged to another Christian church. There were 5 individuals (or about 0.02% of the population) who were Jewish, and 985 (or about 3.04% of the population) who were Islamic. There were 41 individuals who were Buddhist, 82 individuals who were Hindu and 8 individuals who belonged to another church. 1,212 (or about 3.74% of the population) belonged to no church, are agnostic or atheist, and 1,109 individuals (or about 3.42% of the population) did not answer the question.

== Education ==
In Obwalden about 11,601 or (35.8%) of the population have completed non-mandatory upper secondary education, and 3,241 or (10.0%) have completed additional higher education (either university or a Fachhochschule). Of the 3,241 who completed tertiary schooling, 66.0% were Swiss men, 22.0% were Swiss women, 7.3% were non-Swiss men and 4.8% were non-Swiss women.

== Culture ==
Traditional culture in Obwalden has been kept alive by many local organizations. There is traditional music, carnival, dances, costumes, theatres, and festivals. There are also a number of modern artists, including Josef Garovi (composer), Caspar Diethelm (composer), Julian Dillier (poet), Franz Bucher (painter), Kurt Sigrist (sculptor) and Alois Spichtig (sculptor).

== Notable people ==
- Dorothea Wyss (* around 1430/32, † after 1487) married Nicholas of Flüe, the patron saint of Switzerland.
