= Bonstetten =

Bonstetten may refer to:

Places:

- Bonstetten, Switzerland, a village of the Canton of Zürich
- Bonstetten, Bavaria, a community of Bavaria
- von Bonstetten, a historical noble family and Swiss surname
  - Albrecht von Bonstetten (d. c. 1504), deacon at Einsiedeln and humanist writer
  - Charles Victor de Bonstetten (1745-1832), Swiss writer
  - Walter von Bonstetten (1867-1949), Swiss Guide and Scout Movement notable
