= Swiss Guide and Scout Movement =

National Scouting and Guiding association of Switzerland

- The historical membership badge of the Schweizer Pfadfinderbund incorporates the national colors
- Country: Switzerland
- Founded: 1912
- Membership: 55'000 (2022)
- Affiliation: World Association of Girl Guides and Girl Scouts, World Organization of the Scout Movement
- Website; Swiss Guide and Scout Movement

The Swiss Guide and Scout Movement (SGSM) (German: Pfadibewegung Schweiz (PBS), French: Mouvement Scout de Suisse (MSdS), Italian: Movimento Scout Svizzero (MSS), Rumantsch: Moviment Battasendas Svizra (MBS)) is the national Scouting and Guiding association of Switzerland formed in 1987. Scouting was founded in Switzerland in 1912 and was among the charter members of the World Organization of the Scout Movement in 1922 and among the founding members of the World Association of Girl Guides and Girl Scouts in 1928. The SGSM has more than 50,500 members in about 550 local groups (as of 2022).

The Swiss Guide and Scout Movement is mixed at all levels. The only thing that still reminds of the old separation between Girl Guides and Boy Scouts is that some of the terms for different levels (in one or more of the three major languages spoken in Switzerland) are different.

The young age of Swiss leaders is a tradition, "the young lead the young". Even members of the district or national committees are rarely older than 30. This can result in more freedom at the unit level, and provides leadership experience for young people.

The mandatory parts of the Swiss uniform are the shirt, the neckerchief, any kind of good hiking boots, a fire lighter and a Swiss army knife. Optional parts are belt, Scout jeans, hat, dagger, etc. A youth receives his/her neckerchief and vulgo (Scout name) from his unit leader in an initiation ceremony.

== History ==
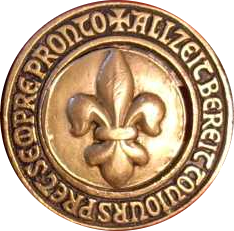

In 1910, the first Scout group in Switzerland was founded in Basel as part of the abstinence movement. fr:Gaston Clerc, then secretary-general of the Unions Cadettes de suisse romande, enthusiastically supported the Scout method after reading Scouting for Boys. He organized several conferences (notably in Le Locle in October 1910) within the cadet unions to explain and discuss the interest of cadets in using the Scout method. In 1911, the first groups of Swiss Girl Guides were formed. Gaston Clerc bought the translations of Scouting for Boys and translated the first chapter for those who would become Scouts. In 1912, delegates of the cadet sections of the Union chrétienne de la suisse romande launched the Swiss Scout movement. William Borel chaired this neutral committee to patronize and spread Scouting in Switzerland. Geneva pedagogue Pierre Bovet took up the translation of Éclaireurs and other Scout books, to make it the first edition in French. This edition was the first in a long series of Scout books published by the publishing house Delachaux et Niestlé in Neuchâtel. In 1913, the Federation of Swiss Scouts (Fédération des Eclaireurs suisses, FES/Schweizerische Pfadfinderbund (SPB)) was founded in Bern. This brought together the multilingual Swiss Scouts under the same organization. In 1919, the Swiss Federation of Girl Guides (Fédération des Eclaireuses suisse, (FESes)/Bund Schweizerischer Pfadfinderinnen (BSP)) was established.

Switzerland was among the charter members of the World Organization of the Scout Movement in 1922 and among the founding members of the World Association of Girl Guides and Girl Scouts in 1928. In 1925, the first Federal Camp was held in Bern, Switzerland.

In 1931, the first World Scout Moot was held at Kandersteg International Scout Centre. In 1939, after the beginning of World War II, Swiss Scouts also began to support the Swiss army. Many Scouts were registered with the International Red Cross.

In 1953, a second World Scout Moot took place In Kandersteg. In 1957, WAGGGS organized a World Camp at the Lac de Conche.

In 1980, the first Federal Camp of FES and FESes in common took place in the region of Gruyères. The originally separate Swiss Guide Federation and Swiss Scout Federation merged in 1987.

In 1992, the World Scout Moot took place in Kandersteg for the third time.

In 2003, the SGSM was reformed. After structural changes, the SGSM is now run by the Swiss federal government Jugend und Sport ("Youth and Sports"), a governmental institution affiliated with the Federal Department of Defence, Civil Protection and Sports, which promotes sports among youth. Camps for youth in the 5-20 age range are subsidized by J+S, and also receive some basic material (wool blankets, denim square units, ropes, spades, etc.) from J+S for these occasions. J+S is also deeply involved in leader training, because unit leaders are basically special youth sport trainers.

== Program ==
=== Sections ===
The association is divided in five sections according to age. The different languages-Swiss German, French, and Italian-use different terms for sections:

- Beaver Scouts: Biber (in German), Castors (in French), Castori (in Italian) - ages 5 to 6
- Brownies and Cubs: Wölfli (in German), Louveteaux (in French), Lupetti (in Italian) - ages 7 to 9/10
- Guides and Scouts: Pfadi (in German), Éclaireurs (in French), Esploratrici/Esploratori (in Italian) - ages 10/11 to 13/14
- Ventures: Pio (in German), Pico (in French), Pionieri (in Italian) - ages 14/15 to 16
- Rovers: Rover (in German), Routiers (in French), Rover (in Italian) - ages 17 and older

Special Scout units include Sea Scouts around the major lakes and Extension Scouting for handicapped young people.

== Scout Motto ==
There are different mottoes for each section:

- Beaver Scouts:
- Brownies and Cubs: My Best translates as Mis Bescht in Swiss German and De notre mieux ("of our best") in French
- Guides and Scouts: Always Prepared translates as Allzeit bereit in German, Toujours prêt in French and Sempre pronto in Italian
- Ventures: Together Further translates as Zäme Wiiter in Swiss German
- Rovers: Act Consciously translates as Bewusst Handeln in German

=== Scout Promise ===
(With the help of God,) with your help and happily I promise to do my best:

- To study in details the values of our Scout Law
- To search for the meaning of my life
- To be involved in the community where I live.

=== Scout Law ===
Guides and Scouts, we wish:

- To be honest and sincere
- To listen to and respect others
- To rejoice in all that is beautiful and give joy to others
- To be thoughtful and helpful
- To share
- To choose to the best of our abilities and to commit ourselves
- To protect nature and respect life
- To face difficulties with confidence

== BuLa Jamborees ==
The Bundeslager (BuLa) (fr:"camp fédéral", it:"campo federale", "rm:"champ federal") "Federal camp" is a scout jamboree that is held by the association every 14 years.

=== Bula occurrences ===
(hosts in parentheses)

- 1925 in Bern (SPB)
- 1932 in Geneva (SPB)
- 1938 in Zürich (SPB)
- 1948 in Trevano, Lugano (SPB)
- 1949 in Gotthard (BSP), first girlscout BuLa
- 1956 in Saignelégier (SPB)
- 1957 in Goms (Bund Schweizerischer Pfadfinderinnen)
- 1966 in Domleschg (SPB
- 1969 in Bleniotal (Bund Schweizerischer Pfadfinderinnen)
- 1980 in Gruyère (SPB and BSP)
- 1994 in Napf Motto «Cuntrast» (SGSM)
- 2008 in Linth valley Motto «Contura» (SGSM)
- 2022 in GomsMotto «mova» (SGSM)

== See also ==
- Kandersteg International Scout Centre
- Walter von Bonstetten
- Pfadi Winterthur
- Our Chalet
- Luc Panissod
- Maurice Machenbaum
