= Knippenberg =

Knippenberg is a surname. Notable people with the surname include:

- Jan Knippenberg (1948–1995), Dutch ultrarunner and historian
- Mark Knippenberg (born 1967), Swiss scouts executive
