= Von Bonstetten =

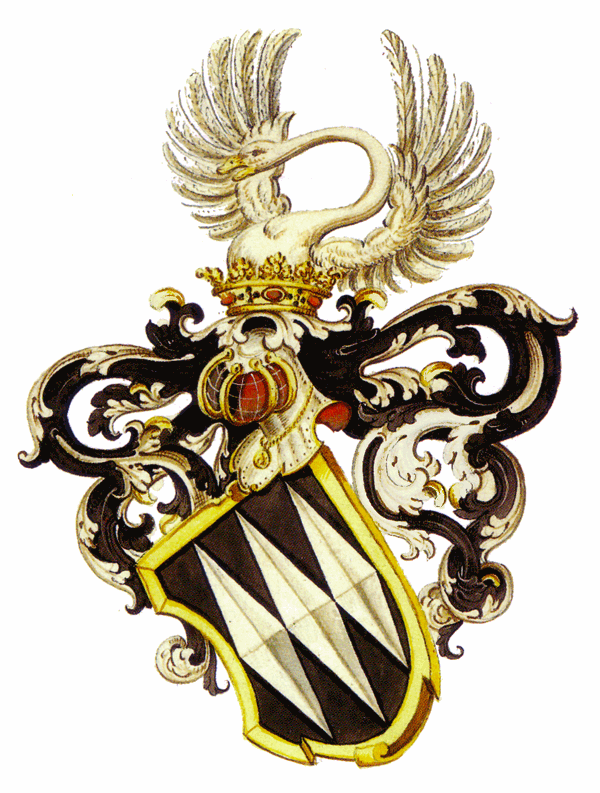
Coat of arms (Genealogisches Handbuch des Adels, 1972)

Bonstetten was the name of a noble family originally from Bonstetten, Switzerland (now in the Swiss canton of Zürich).

First mentioned in 1122 with one Henricus de Bonstadin, the family held the office of reeves in Zürich in the 13th century, and several members acted as judges in Thurgau in the 13th and 14th century. In the 14th century, they acquired Oberelsass, Aargau and Sundgau, rising to considerable prominence and entering marital ties with the House of Habsburg.

Hermann von Bonstetten was prince-abbot of St Gall Abbey in 1333–1360.

In the 15th century, the family lost its prominence and was reduced to the status of local lower nobility. In 1498, they received a confirmation of their baronial status from Maximilian I. The family now became part of the patriciate of Zürich and Bern. The Zürich line was extinct in 1606. Humanist Albrecht von Bonstetten (died c. 1504) was from the Bern line. The Bern line prospered, and produced a number of prominent politicians and officers in the early modern period, now also styled de Bonstetten (as in Charles Victor de Bonstetten, 1745–1832; Walther von Bonstetten, 1867-1949).
