= Kitepower =

- Type: B.V.
- Industry: Wind Energy, Renewable Energy
- Founded: 2016
- Founders: Johannes Peschel, Dr. Roland Schmehl
- Headquarters: Delft, Netherlands
- Number of employees: 18
- Website: https://thekitepower.com/

Kitepower is a registered trademark of the Dutch company Enevate B.V. developing mobile airborne wind power systems. Kitepower was founded in 2016 by Christoph Grete, Lukas Braun, Felix Friedl, Johannes Peschel, Anastasios Tzavellas and Roland Schmehl as a university spin-off from the Delft University of Technology’s airborne wind energy research group established by former astronaut Wubbo Ockels. The company is located in Delft, Netherlands, and currently comprises 18 employees (2018).

== System ==
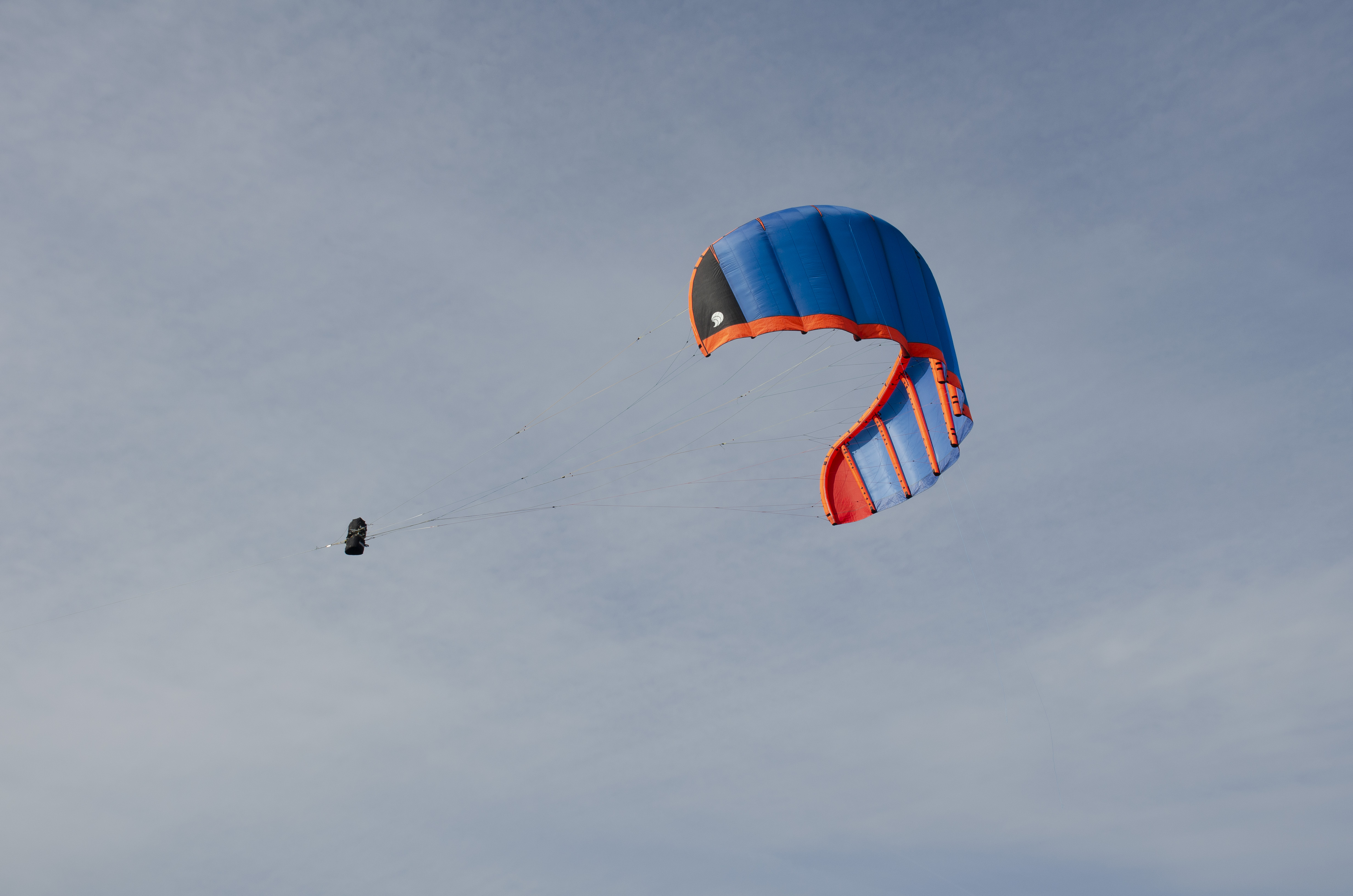
40 m² kite with suspended control unit

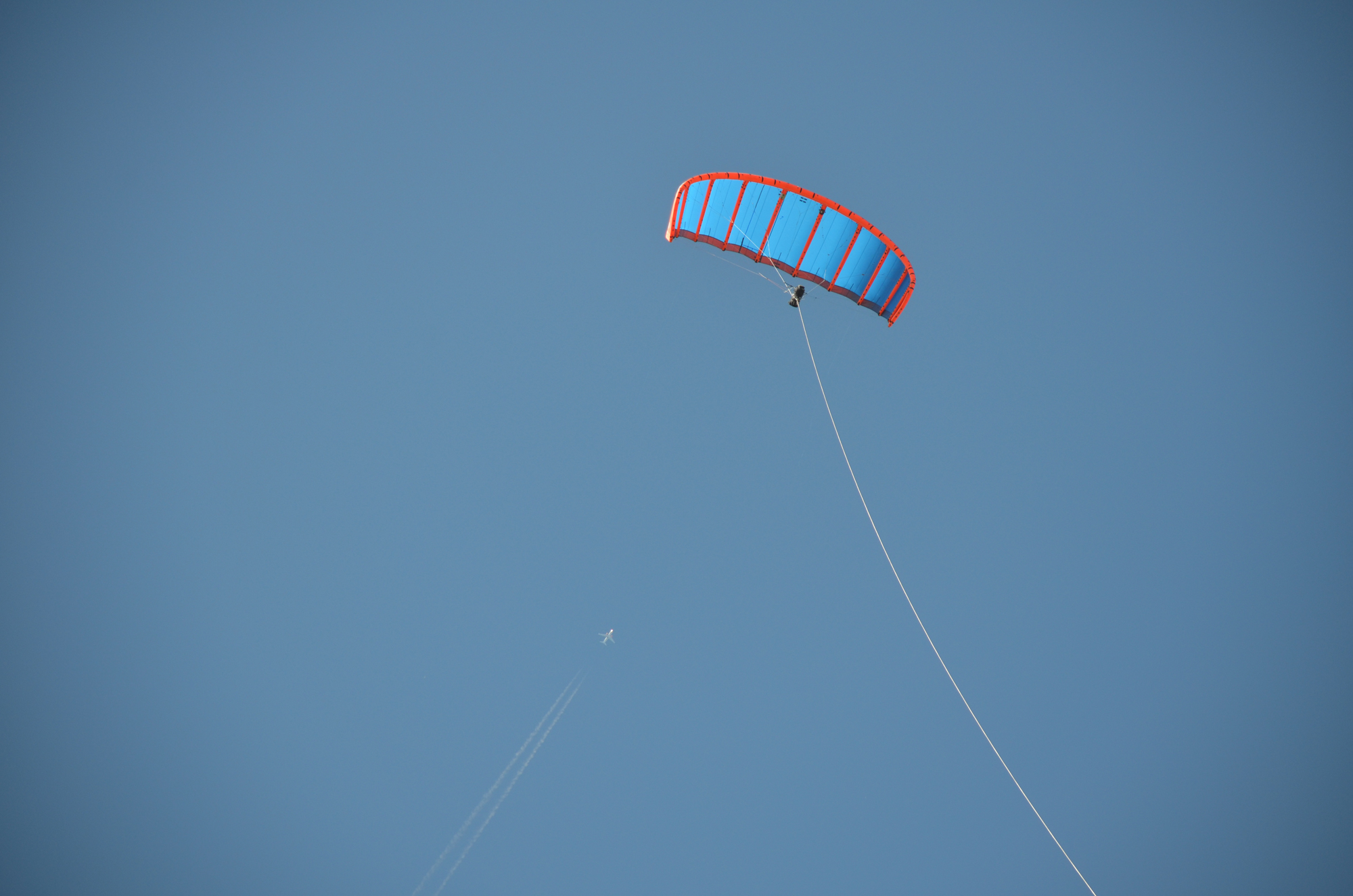
40 m² kite in operation at the former naval airbase Valkenburg, Leiden, the Netherlands

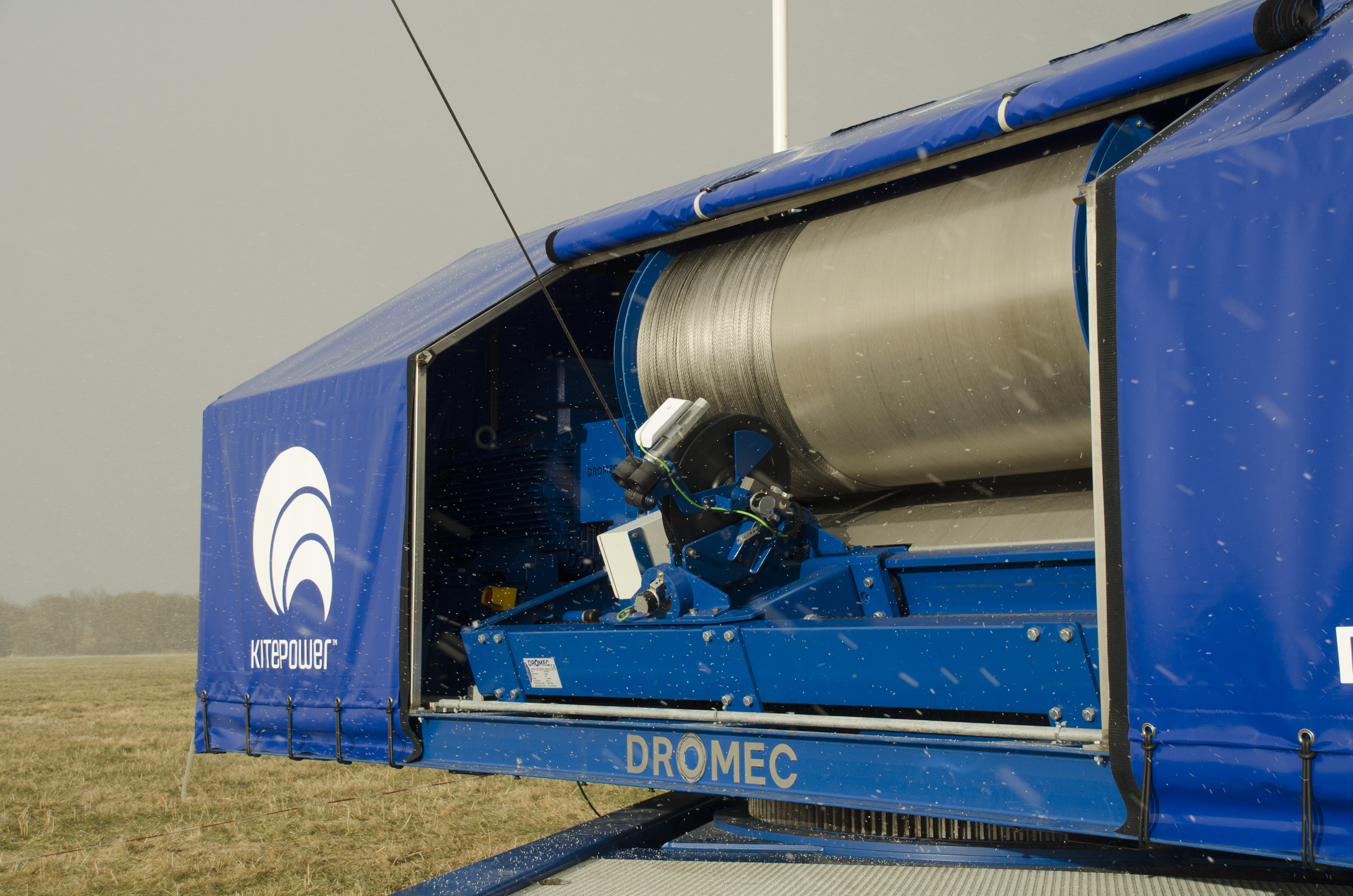
100 kW ground station

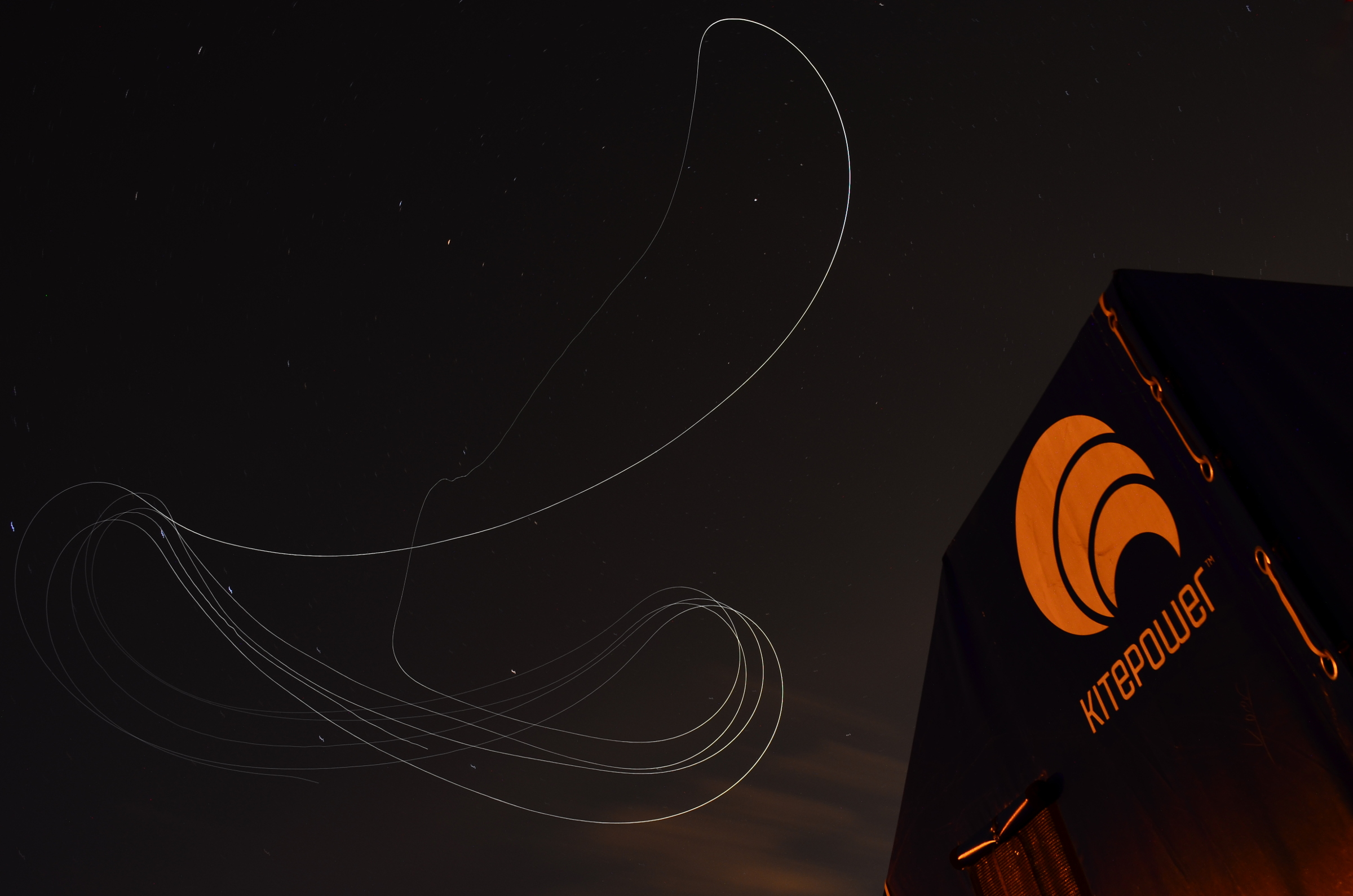
Nightflight with tracing light, visualizing a complete pumping cycle with traction phase (figure eight maneuvers) and retraction phase

Based on its first 20 kW (rated generator power) prototype, Kitepower is currently developing a scaled-up 100 kW system for the purpose of commercialization. Funding was provided by the European Commission's Horizon 2020 Fast Track to Innovation project REACH in which the company was collaborating with Delft University of Technology and industry partners Dromec, Maxon Motor and Genetrix.

== Working principle ==
The Kitepower system consists of three major components: a soft kite, a load-bearing tether and a ground-based electric generator. Another important component is a kite control unit suspended near the kite and connecting the single main tether and the kite's multiple control lines. Together with the according control software it is used for remotely steering the kite.

For energy production, the kite is operated in consecutive "pumping cycles" with alternating reel-out and reel-in phases: during reel-out the kite is flown in crosswind maneuvers (transverse to the incoming wind) such as figure-of-eights. The kite then moves faster than the wind speed (the apparent wind speed is several times the true wind speed during most of the time) and this creates a large pulling force which unwinds the tether from a ground-based drum connected to a generator. In this phase electricity is generated. Once the maximum tether length is reached, the kite is reeled back, but this time depowered by flying the kite to a static position such as overhead, so that the apparent wind speed relative to the kite is reduced to the true wind speed. It can then be retracted slowly with a small force. This phase consumes a small fraction of the previously generated power such that in total net energy is produced. The electricity is buffered by a rechargeable battery unit, or, in a kite park configuration, several systems can be operated with phase shifts such that the battery capacity can be reduced.

== Technology context ==
Airborne wind energy serves as a potential cost-competitive solution to existing renewable energy technologies. The main advantages of the airborne wind energy technology are the reduced material usage compared to conventional wind turbines (no foundation, no tower) which allows reaching for higher altitudes and makes the systems more mobile and cheaper to construct. Challenges include issues with the robustness and reliability of the flying wind energy system and the airspace requirements of the technology. A considerable body of scientific literature and patents has been developed.

== Applications ==
For the art project Windvogel of Dutch artist Daan Roosegaarde the Kitepower system was operated also during night, using a light-emitting tether. In October 2021 the company deployed its 100 kW system during a 3 weeks exercise of the Dutch engineering corps on the Caribbean Island Aruba.

Since September 2023 Kitepower has been generating electricity with a "hawk" kite in Co. Mayo, Ireland in what has been described as the first designated airborne wind energy test site.

== Awards ==
- YES!Delft Launchlab 2016
- Dutch Defense Innovation Competition 2016
- YES!Delft Incubation Program 2017

== See also ==
- List of airborne wind energy organizations
- Crosswind kite power
- Airborne wind turbine
- Wind power
