= Geographical centre of Switzerland =

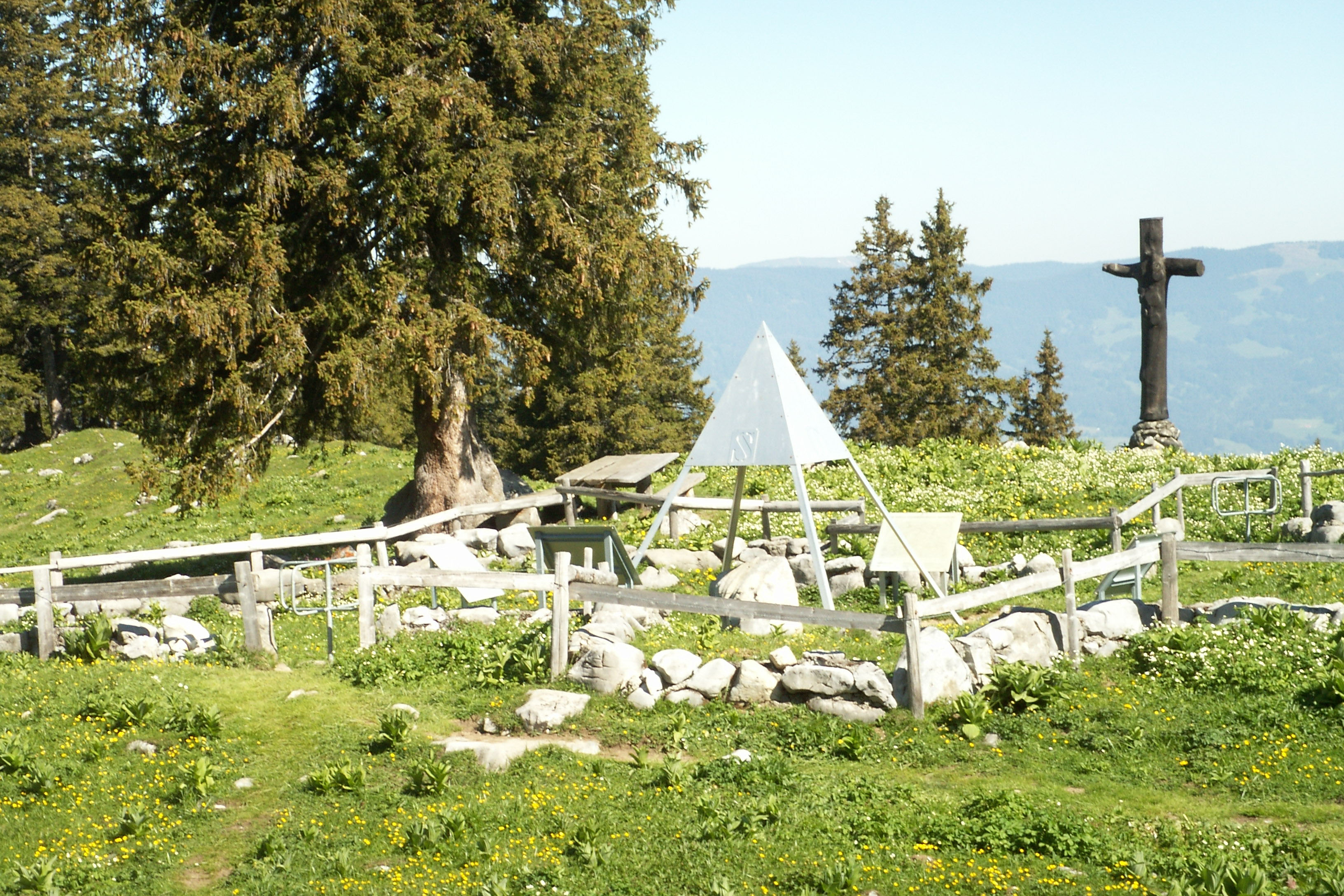
Marker symbolizing the geographical centre of Switzerland

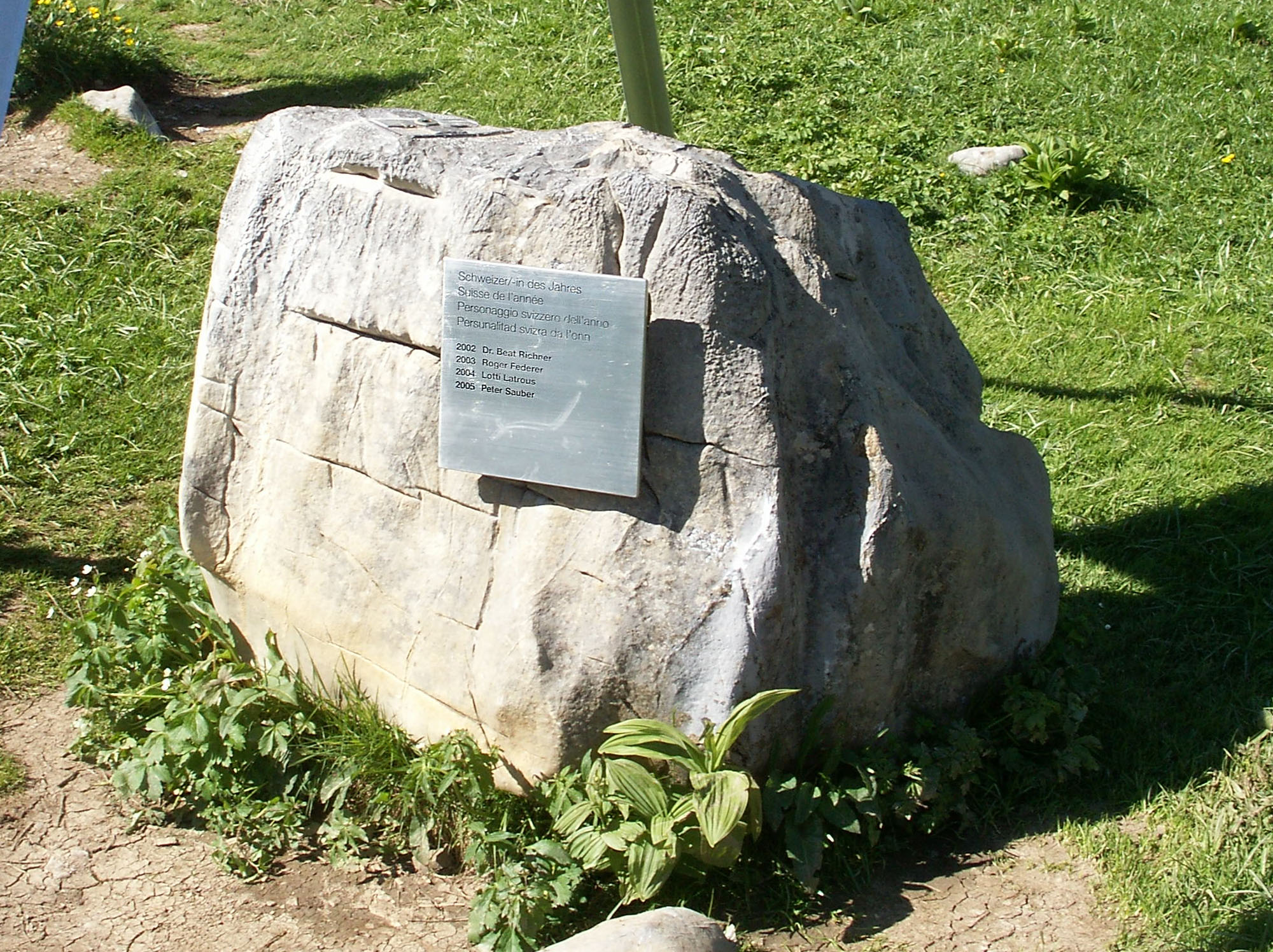
Stone with the "Swiss of the Year" plaque at the centre of Switzerland

The geographical centre of Switzerland has the coordinates 46°48′4″N 8°13′36″E (Swiss Grid: 660158/183641). It is located at Älggi-Alp in the municipality of Sachseln, Obwalden. The point is the centre of mass determined in 1988 by Swisstopo.

As the point is difficult to access, a stone was set 500 m further south-east on Älggi Alp (1645 m). This symbolizes the centre of Switzerland and is located at 46°47′54″N 8°13′55″E (Swiss Grid: 660557/183338). A plaque on the stone commemorates the winner of the "Swiss of the Year" award.

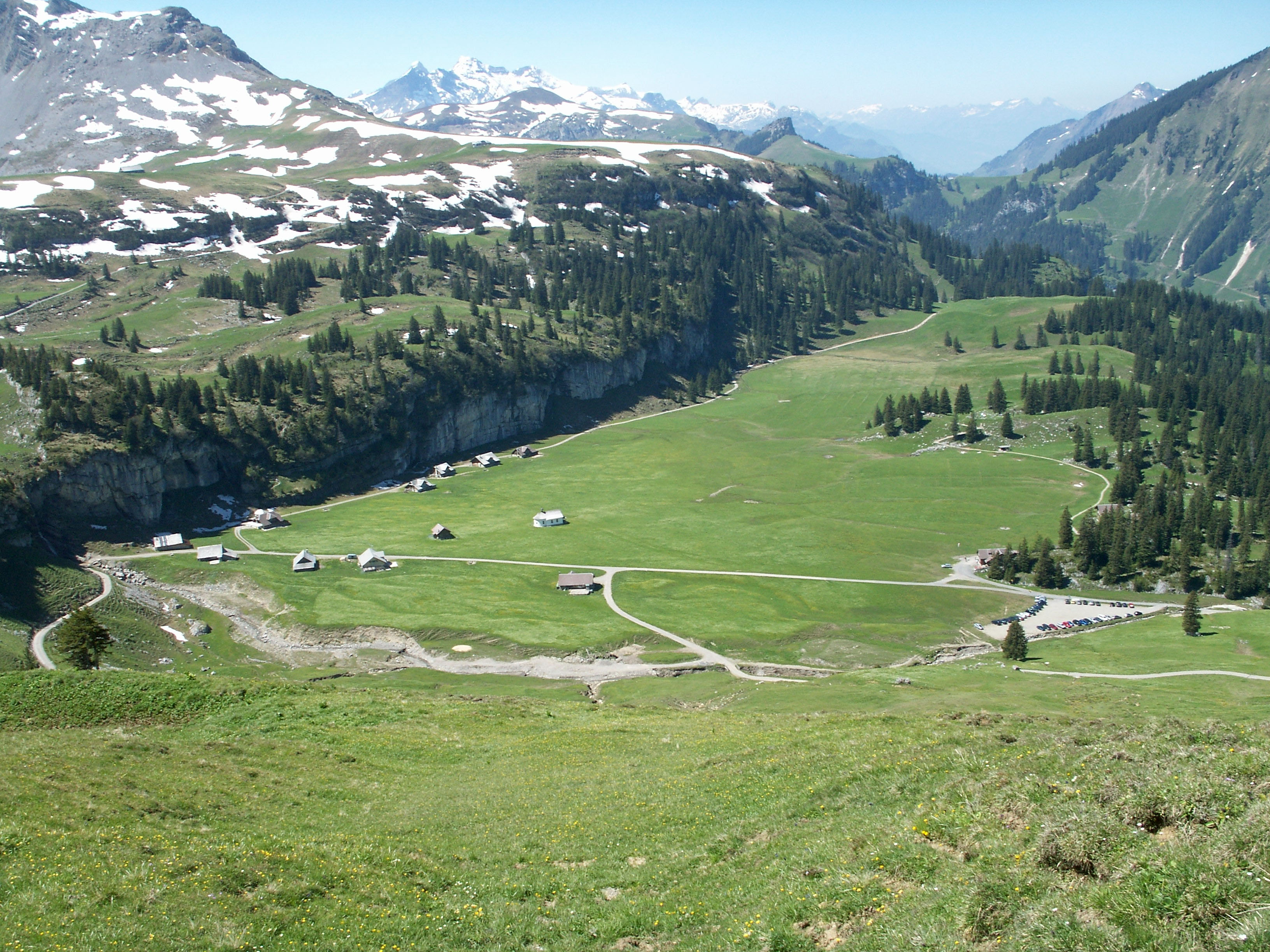
Älggi Alp
