= Nicholas of Flüe =

Swiss hermit and ascetic who is the patron saint of Switzerland

Saint Nicholas of Flüe
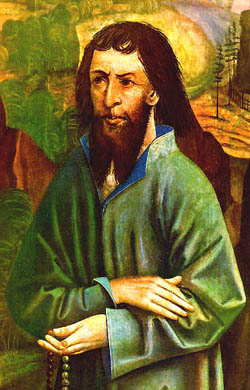
- Nicholas of Flüe, from the altar piece of the local parish church in Sachseln.

Brother Klaus
- Born: 1417; Unterwalden, Switzerland
- Died: 21 March 1487; Sachseln, Switzerland
- Venerated in: Catholicism
- Beatified: 1669
- Canonized: 1947 by Pope Pius XII
- Major shrine: Sachseln, Switzerland
- Feast: 21 March (25 September in Switzerland and Germany)
- Patronage: Switzerland, Pontifical Swiss Guards

Nicholas of Flüe (German: Niklaus von Flüe; 1417 – 21 March 1487) was a Swiss hermit and ascetic who is the patron saint of Switzerland. He is sometimes invoked as Brother Klaus. A farmer, military leader, member of the assembly, councillor, judge and mystic, he was respected as a man of complete moral integrity. He is known for having fasted for over twenty years. Brother Klaus's counsel to the Diet of Stans (1481) helped prevent war between the Swiss cantons.

== Early life ==
In 1417, Nicholas was born in the village Flüeli near Sachseln, in the canton of Unterwalden as the eldest son of wealthy peasants. He had two brothers named Eglof and Peter. The family's surname von Flüe comes from a rock (Fluh=Flüe). He was baptized in Kerns. In 1431/1432 he accompanied his father to the local peasants council and was therefore admitted as a member of the free peasants of Obwalden.

At the age of 21, he enrolled in the army and during the Old Zürich War, waged against the canton of Zurich by the rest of the Old Swiss Confederacy, Nicholas distinguished himself as a soldier and took part in the Battle of Ragaz in 1446. He later took up arms again in the so-called Thurgau war against Archduke Sigismund of Austria in 1460. It was thanks to Nicholas' influence that a house of the Dominican nuns, the convent of St. Katharinental, where many Austrians had fled after the capture of Diessenhofen, escaped being destroyed by the Swiss confederates. They farmed in the hamlet of Flüeli in the alpine foothills, above Sachseln on the Lake Sarnen. He also continued to serve in the military to the age of 37, rising to the rank of captain. He reportedly fought with a sword in one hand and a rosary in the other. After leaving military service, he became a councillor for his canton and then in 1459, for nine years, served as a judge. He declined the opportunity to serve as Landammann (governor) of his canton.

== Political mystic ==
After receiving a mystical vision of a lily being eaten by a horse, which he recognized as indicating that the cares of his worldly life (the draft horse pulling a plough) were swallowing up his spiritual life (the lily, a symbol of purity), he decided to devote himself entirely to the contemplative life. In 1467, he left his wife and his ten children with her consent rescinded all his political duties and aimed to join a mystic brotherhood near Basel. A few miles away in Waldenburg, he saw three visions that made him understand his aim was not God's and made him return towards the Melchtal, near his former home as he didn't dare to return home. Discovered a few days after his arrival by some hunters, he eventually set himself up a hermit in the Ranft chine in Switzerland, establishing a chantry for a priest from his own funds so that he could assist at mass daily. Having arrived in the Ranft, he began to fast and after having received the consent of Oswald Yssner, the priest in Kerns, he didn't eat anymore. Upon Yssner's doubt and insistence for a clarification, Niklaus explained that he received enough nourishment from the priest receiving the Host, only by assisting at Mass. Symbolic visions continued to be a feature of his contemplation, and he became a spiritual guide whose advice was widely sought and followed.

His reputation for wisdom and piety was such that notables and clergy from across Europe came to seek advice from him. The Benedictine abbot of Sponheim Johannes Trithemius convinced by the reports he heard from people who met Niklaus, compared him with Saint Anthony. In 1470, Pope Paul II granted the first indulgence to the sanctuary at Ranft and it became a pilgrimage site on the Way of Saint James, a pilgrims' route to Santiago de Compostela in Spain. His counsel prevented a civil war between the cantons meeting at the Diet of Stans in 1481, when their antagonism grew. Despite being illiterate and having limited experience with the world, he is honored among both Protestants and Catholics with the permanent national unity of Switzerland. The Archduke Sigismund sent him a gilded chalice in 1473 and 100 Guilders in 1481. Letters of thanks to him from Berne and Soleure still survive. When he died, on 21 March 1487, he was surrounded by his wife and children.

== Prayer citation ==
The new Catechism of the Catholic Church cites a brief personal prayer of Nicholas of Flue in paragraph #226 of Chapter 1 of Part 1, Section 2 "The Profession of the Christian Faith" under subheading IV "The implications of faith in one God", an aspect of which is making good use of created things.

My Lord and my God, take from me everything that distances me from you.
My Lord and my God, give me everything that brings me closer to you.
My Lord and my God, detach me from myself to give my all to you.

== Veneration ==
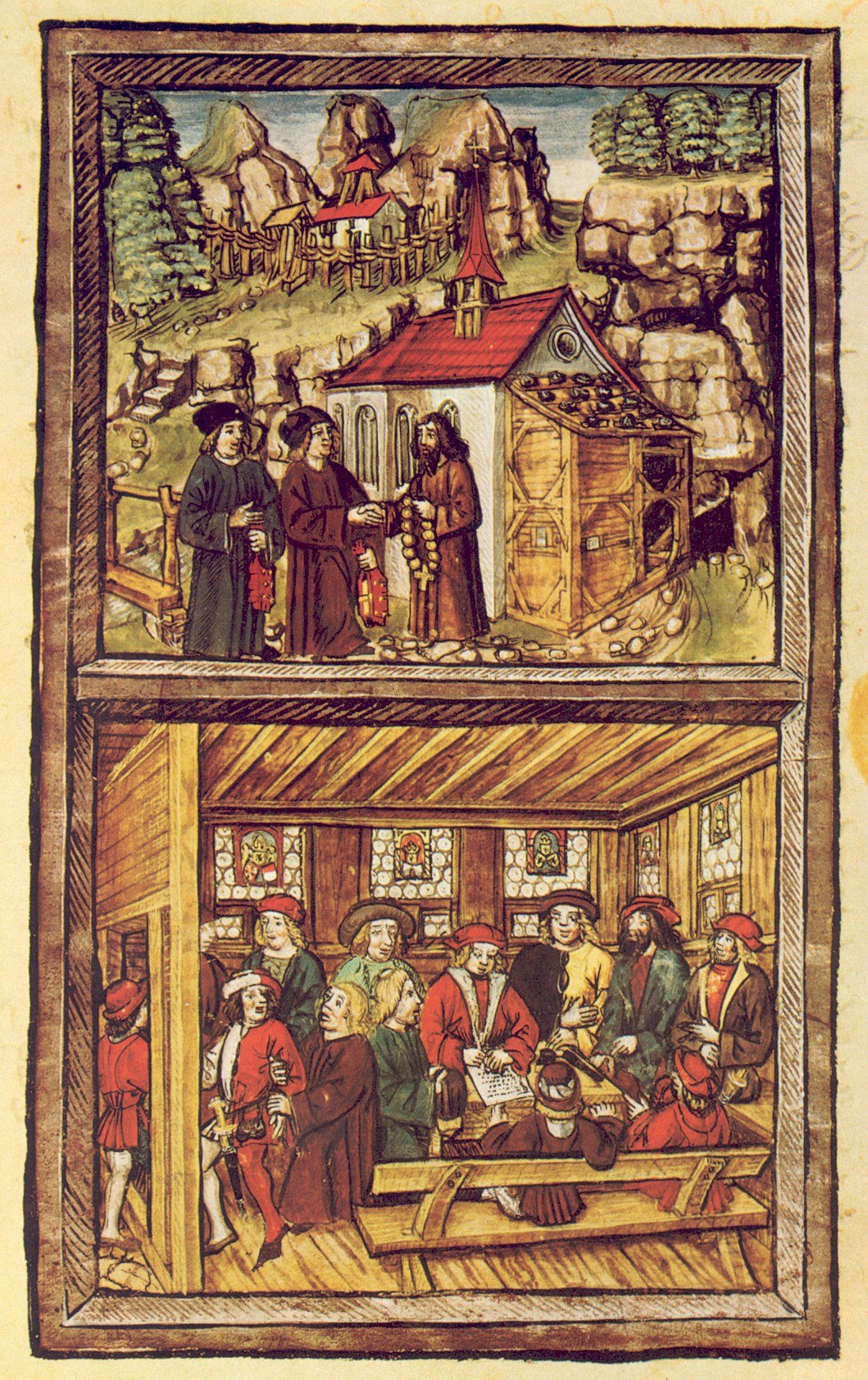
A plate from the Amtliche Luzerner Chronik of 1513 of Diebold Schilling the Younger, illustrating the events of the Tagsatzung at Stans in 1481. Top: A priest named Heini am Grund visits Niklaus von Flüe to ask him for his advice to save the failing Tagsatzung at Stans, where the delegates of the rural and urban cantons of the Old Swiss Confederacy could not agree and threatened civil war. Bottom: Am Grund returned to the Tagsatzung and related Niklaus' advice, whereupon the delegates compromised. Am Grund is shown holding back a bailiff who wants to go and spread the good news already: Niklaus' advice remains secret to this day.

During his lifetime pilgrims who had visited the Einsiedeln abbey often also went to the nearby Ranft. After Nicholas of Flüe died in 1487, his funeral was attended by a large number of people and he was buried in the chapel in Sachseln. The Austrian Archduke Sigismund organized a memorial service for Niklaus with a hundred priests in Vienna. His tomb would become a prominent site of pilgrimage and by 1518 the epitaph with a depiction of him had to be renewed. In In 1492 he was painted on the interior of his burial chapel.

He was beatified in 1669. After his beatification, the municipality of Sachseln built a church in his honour, where his body was interred. During World War II he was the spiritual saviour of Switzerland, and in August 1941 the Swiss bishops promised to go on a pilgrimage in his honour if the country was spared from the effects of war. He was canonized in 1947 by Pope Pius XII. His feast day in the Catholic Church is 21 March, except in Switzerland and Germany, where it is 25 September. In June 1984, Pope John Paul II held a mass in Flüeli Ranft and a prayer at the tomb of Niklaus von Flüe in Sachseln during his visit to Switzerland.

von Flüe is the patron saint of the German-language association KLB (Katholischen Landvolkbewegung), the Catholic Rural Communities Movement.

== Biographies on Nicholas of Flüe ==
The abbot of the Einsiedeln abbey Albrecht von Bonstetten wrote the first known report on his life in 1479, while Nicholas still alive. In his report Historia fratris Nicholae the abbot distinguished between witnesses who saw, heard or heard someone say something on the life of Nicholas. In 1485 the report was translated from latin into german on request by the clergy and mayor of Nuremberg.

A second biography was written a year after Nicholas died by Heinrich of Gundelfingen. It was called Historia Nicholae Unterwadensis eremitae and presented to the authorities of Lucerne. He alluded that Nicholas aimed at re-establishing the ascetic life of the early christian Saints. He acknowledged his ascetic life but was skeptical on his yearlong fasting.

The Government of Obwalden requested from Heinrich Wölflin, a noted historian of the time to write a biography of Niklaus von Flüe in 1493. Wölflin then recollected reports of witnesses for several years and published the first state sponsored biography in 1501 in Latin. Wölflins biography was translated into German in 1947 by Josef Konrad Scheuber.

== Visionary images ==
Of the many spiritual insights Nicholas received in his visions, one, in particular, is reproduced often in a reduced logographic format, as a mystical wheel. Nicholas described his vision of the Holy Face at the center of a circle with the tips of three swords touching the two eyes and mouth, while three others radiate outwards in a sixfold symmetry reminiscent of the Seal of Solomon. A cloth painted with the image, known as the meditation prayer cloth associates the symbol with six episodes from the life of Christ: the mouth of God at the Annunciation, the eyes spying Creation both in its prelapsarian innocence and redemption from the Fall at Calvary, while in the inward direction the betrayal by his disciple Judas in the Garden of Gethsamene points to the crown of the Pantocrator sitting in the judgment seat, the glad tidings of the Nativity scene's "Glory to God in the Highest and Peace to his people on Earth" echoes in the ear on the right of the head, while the memorial of the Lord's Supper "This is my body, which will be given for you" at the prayers of consecration in the Divine Liturgy of the Mass echoes to the ear on the left of the head.

These six medallions contain additional symbols of acts of Christian kindness:

1. two crutches suggest Visiting the sick as a work of mercy
2. hiker's walking stick with travel pouch suggests Hospitality to strangers
3. a loaf of bread, fish and a pitcher of water and wine represent Feed the hungry, quench the thirsty
4. chains indicate Care for the incarcerated
5. Christ's garments evoke Clothe the naked
6. a coffin reminds us to Bury the dead

This visual interpretation encapsulates the personal piety of rural peasants, many illiterate, for whom salvation history was expressed in these crucial aspects of God's loving relationship with us and the Christian duty to the love of neighbor. Sanctifying grace flows from the Paschal Victim on the Cross, an image Nicholas described in his vision by the stream, where the Tabernacle sits atop a spring that flows forth covering the earth, echoing the rivers flowing from the Temple in Ezekiel's visions. Such profound insights on the allegorical, anagogical and tropological senses of scripture are often lost in modern biblical exegesis that focuses too narrowly on the literal sense, the historical-critical method. One vision he had between 1474, the year the monk Hans von Waltheim visited him, and 1478, when Albrecht von Bonstetten. He was frightened by the vision of a glowing face and adopted a bewildered appearance which also shocked von Bonstetten. The medieval biographer Heinrich Wölflin wrote that other visitors were also frightened but there is no other report about this.

== Personal life ==
In 1445/1446, when he was around the age of 29, he married Dorothea Wyss, a farmer's daughter and at the time fourteen years of age. The newly weds settled into a house built by Niklaus von Flüe. The next year the first son Hans was born. According to his own account, after his turn to a life as a hermit, he did not feel tempted to return to an earthly life with wife and children.

== See also ==
- Nicolas de Flue, play written after World War II by Denis de Rougemont
