= Sachseln =

- Municipality
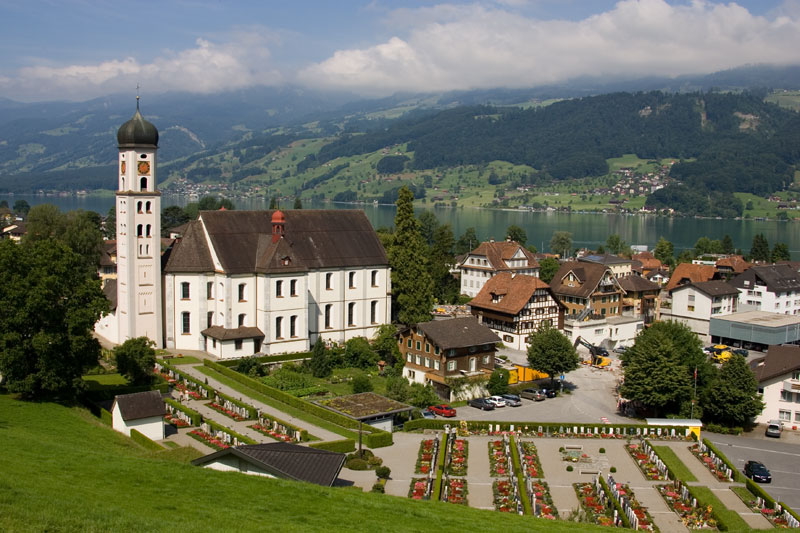

- Flag Coat of arms
- Location of Sachseln
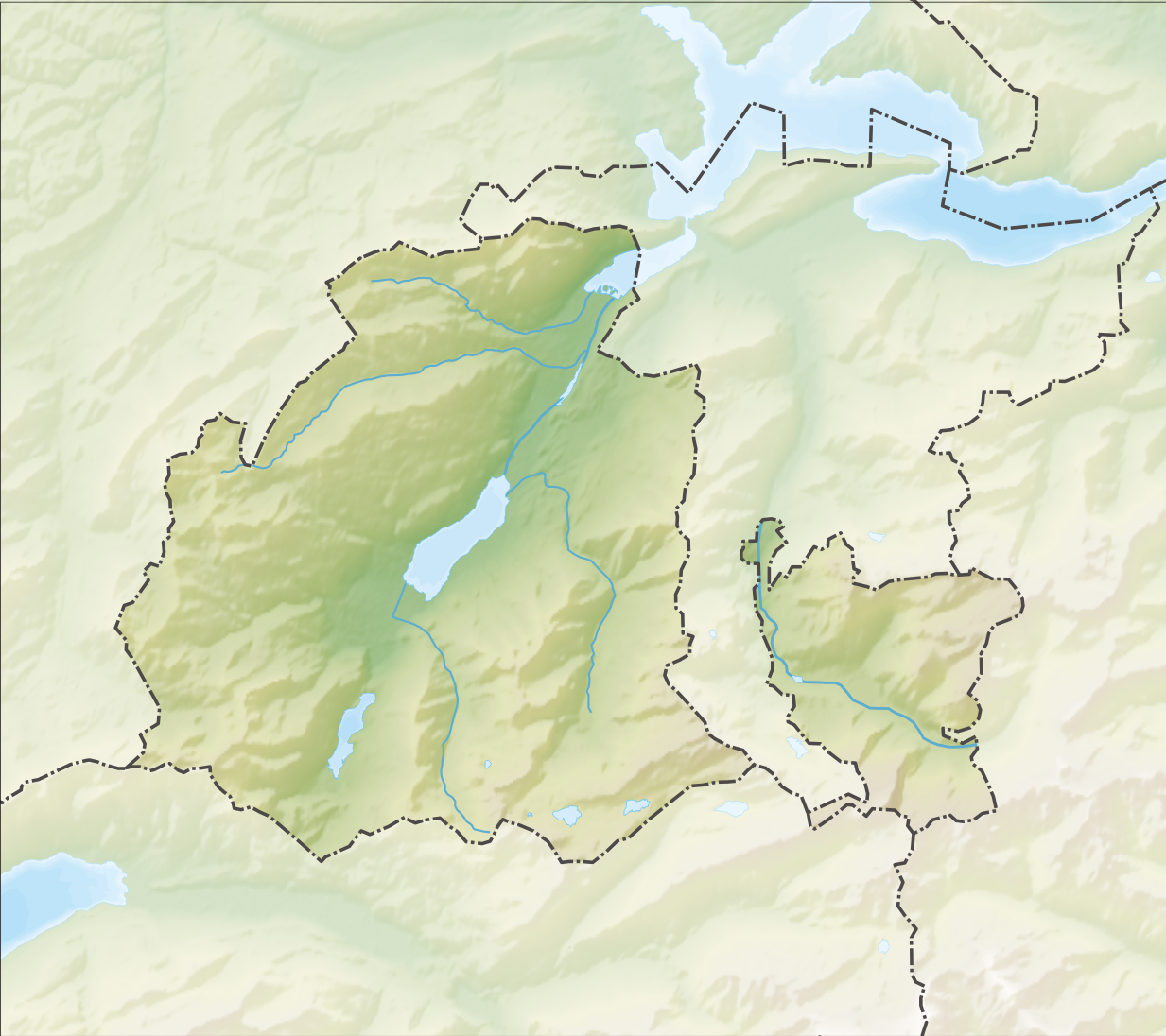
- Location within Switzerland Location within Canton of Obwalden
- Coordinates: 46°52′N 8°14′E
- Country: Switzerland
- Canton: Obwalden
- District: n.a.

Area
  - Total: 53.86 km^{2} (20.80 sq mi)
- Elevation: 483 m (1,585 ft)

Population (December 2020)
  - Total: 5,145
  - Density: 95.53/km^{2} (247.4/sq mi)
- Time zone: UTC+01:00 (CET)
  - Summer (DST): UTC+02:00 (CEST)
- Postal code: 6072
- SFOS number: 1406
- ISO 3166 code: CH-OW
- Surrounded by: Giswil, Kerns, Lungern, Sarnen
- Website: www.sachseln.ch

Sachseln is a village and municipality in the canton of Obwalden in Switzerland. Besides the village of Sachseln, the municipality includes the hamlets of Edisried, Ewil and Flüeli-Ranft.

== History ==
Sachseln is first mentioned in 1173 as Saxhslen.

== Geography ==
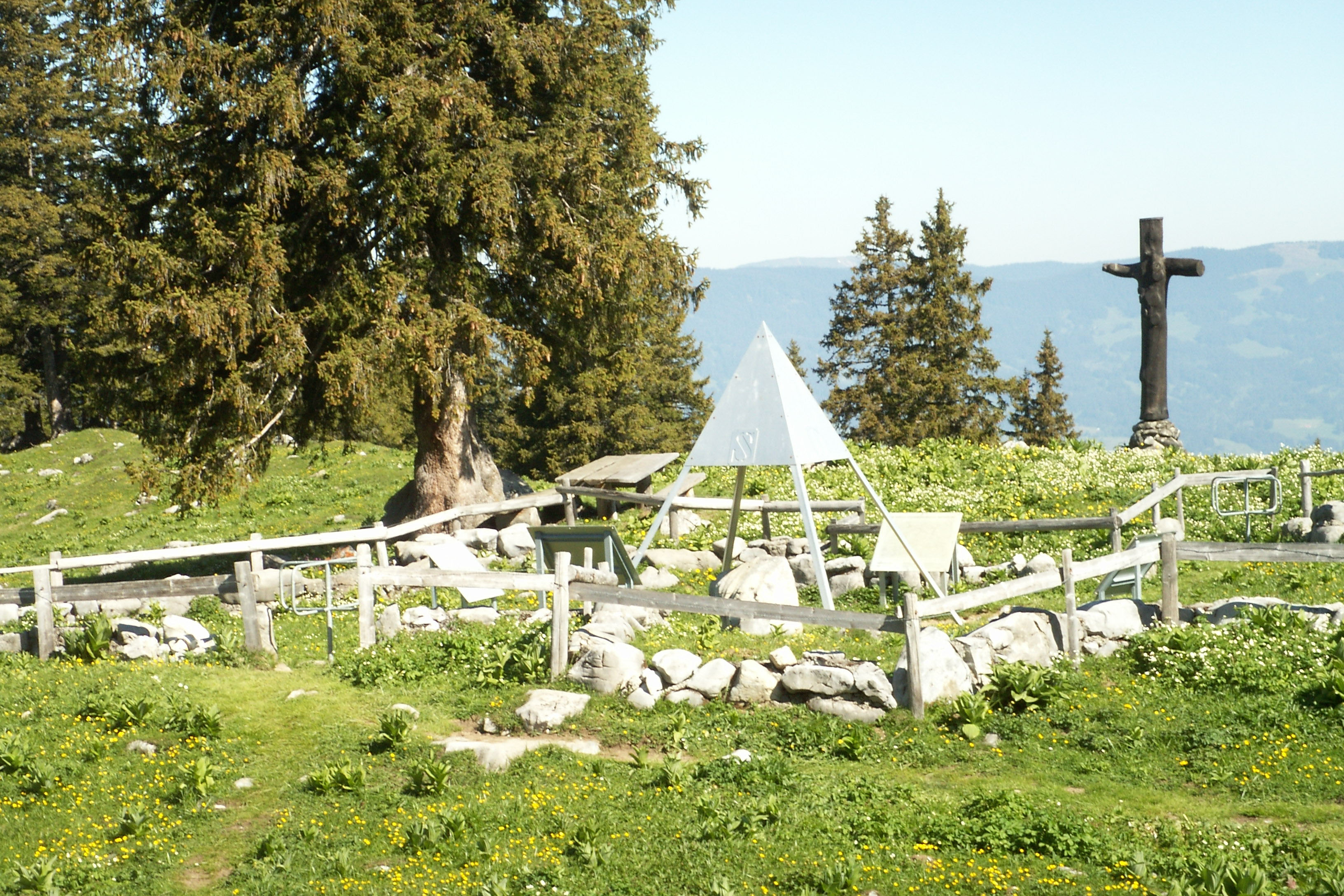
Geographic center of Switzerland

Aerial view from 200 m by Walter Mittelholzer (1919)

Sachseln has an area, as of 2006, of 53.8 square kilometers (20.8 sq mi). Of this area, 45.4% is used for agricultural purposes, while 39.4% is forested. Of the rest of the land, 3.1% is settled (buildings or roads) and the remainder (12.1%) is non-productive (rivers, glaciers or mountains).

The municipality is located on Lake Sarnen (Sarnersee). It consists of the village of Sachseln and the hamlets of Edisried, Ewil and Flüeli-Ranft.

The geographic center of Switzerland is in Sachseln.

== Demographics ==
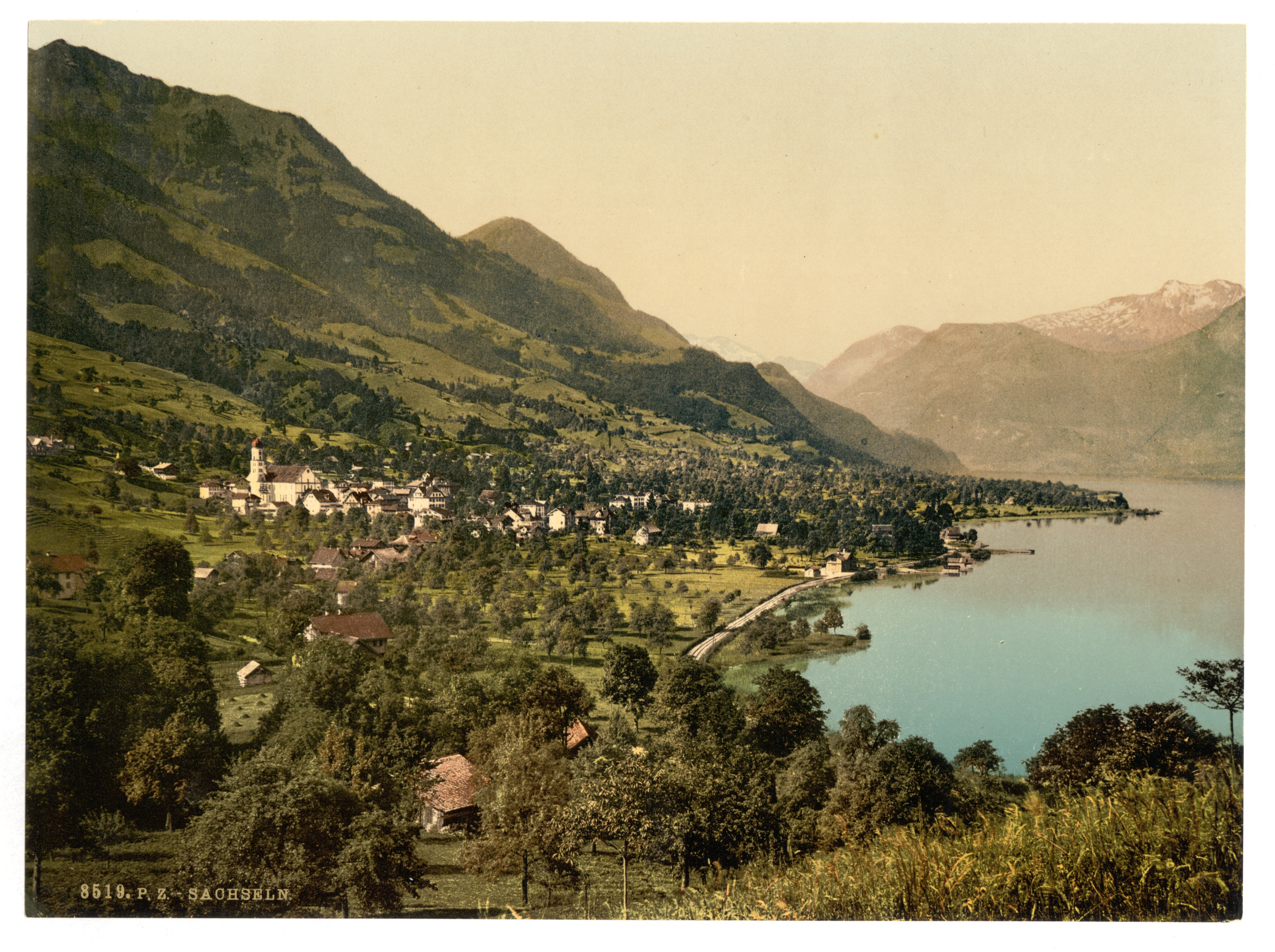
Sachseln and the Sarnersee in 1900

Sachseln has a population (as of 31 December 2020) of 5,145. As of 2007, 13.4% of the population was made up of foreign nationals. Over the last 10 years the population has grown at a rate of 8.7%. Most of the population (as of 2000) speaks German (92.8%), with Serbo-Croatian being second most common ( 1.5%) and Portuguese being third ( 1.1%). As of 2000 the gender distribution of the population was 49.6% male and 50.4% female. As of 2000 there are 1,417 households, while in 2009 the total was 2,104 with 1,867 households in Sachseln and 237 in Flüeli-Ranft.

In the 2007 federal election the most popular party was the CVP which received 36.2% of the vote. The next three most popular parties were the SVP (30.9%), the Other (19.9%) and the SPS (13%).

In Sachseln about 71% of the population (between age 25–64) have completed either non-mandatory upper secondary education or additional higher education (either university or a Fachhochschule).

As of 2008 the religious population distribution was; 3,641 or 78.8% are Roman Catholic, while 315 or 6.8% belonged to the Swiss Reformed Church. There are 664 individuals (or about 14.37% of the population) who belong to another church (not listed on the census) or no church.

The historical population is given in the following table:

year	population
1799	1,250
1837	1,358
1850	1,506
1880	1,701
1900	1,628
1950	2,423
1960	2,721
1970	3,059
1980	3,406
1990	3,690
2000	4,241
2007	4,542
2014	5,044

== Economy ==
Sachseln has an unemployment rate of 0.76%. As of 2005, there were 251 people employed in the primary economic sector and about 100 businesses involved in this sector. 1,452 people are employed in the secondary sector and there are 46 businesses in this sector. 709 people are employed in the tertiary sector, with 105 businesses in this sector.

A major employer within the municipality is Maxon Motor, a manufacturer of precision electric motors, who have their corporate headquarters and a production plant at Ewil. A total of 1,150 employees are employed at Maxon Motor's Sachseln site.

== Transport ==
Sachseln is served by the railway stations of Sachseln and Ewil Maxon, situated respectively in the village centre and in the hamlet of Ewil. Both stations are on the Brünig line, and the half-hourly Lucerne S-Bahn S5 service stops at both stations.

== Notable people ==
- Dorothea Wyss (* around 1430/32, † after 1487), wife of Niklaus von Flüe, the patron saint of Switzerland.
- Ludwig von Flüe was a Swiss mercenary in French service. He was the commanding officer of the Swiss Guards in the defense of the Storming of the Bastille in July 1789.

== Sights ==
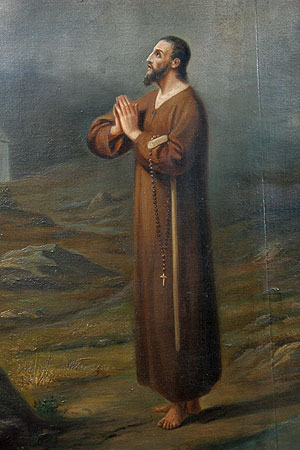
Painting of Bruder Klaus

The main sights of Sacheln are: the local saint Bruder Klaus (place of birth, place of residence, museum, crust Flüeli-Ranft), a church of pilgrimage, the school building Mattli, and the geographical centre of Switzerland Aelggi.
