= Dorothea Wyss =

Wife of Niklaus von Flüe, patron saint of Switzerland

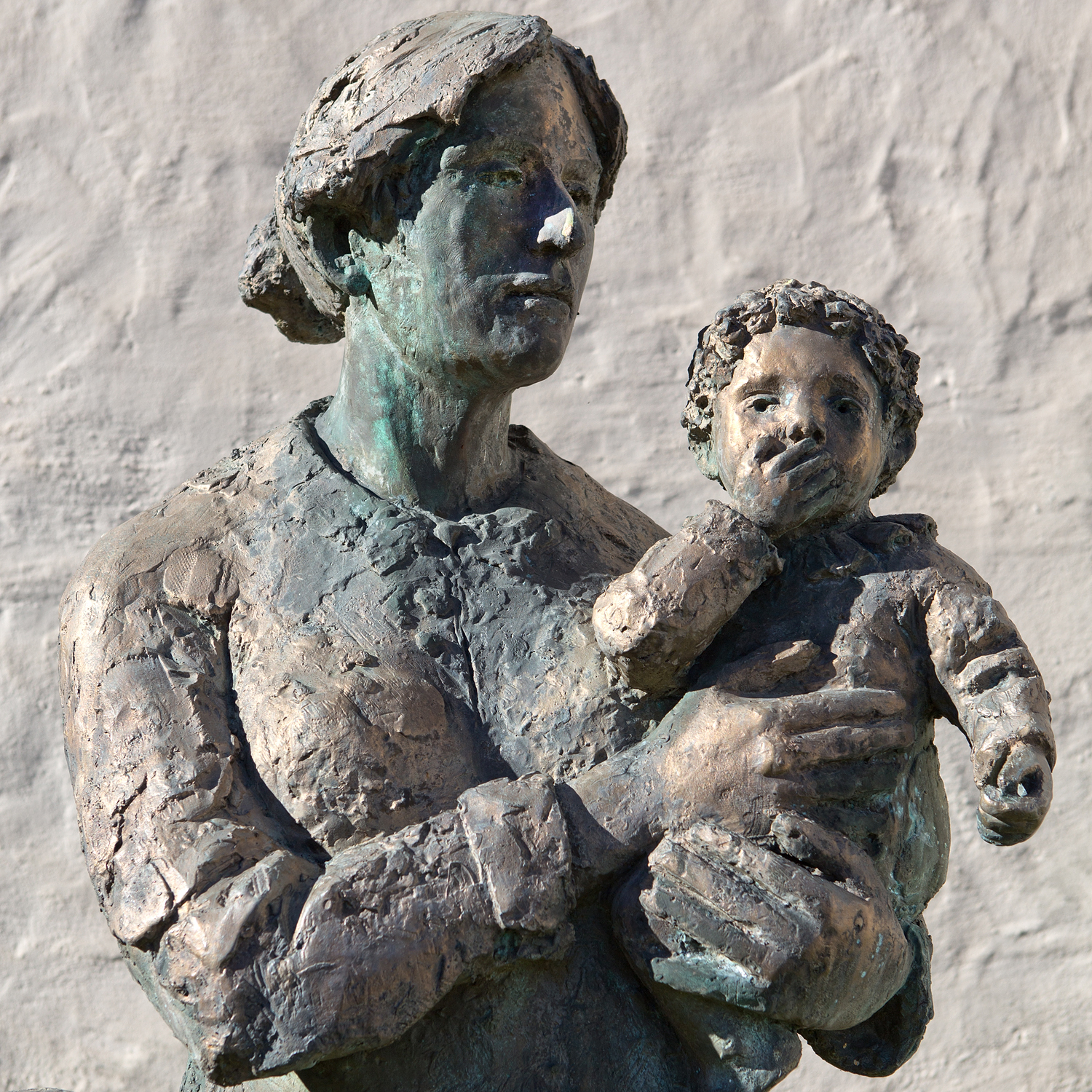
- Born: around 1430/32; Obwalden
- Died: after 1487; Sachseln
- Years active: 1450–1487
- Known for: married Niklaus von Flüe and mother of their 10 children

Dorothea Wyss (c. 1430/32 – after 1487), also known Dorothea von Flüe, married Niklaus von Flüe, the patron saint of Switzerland.

== Life ==
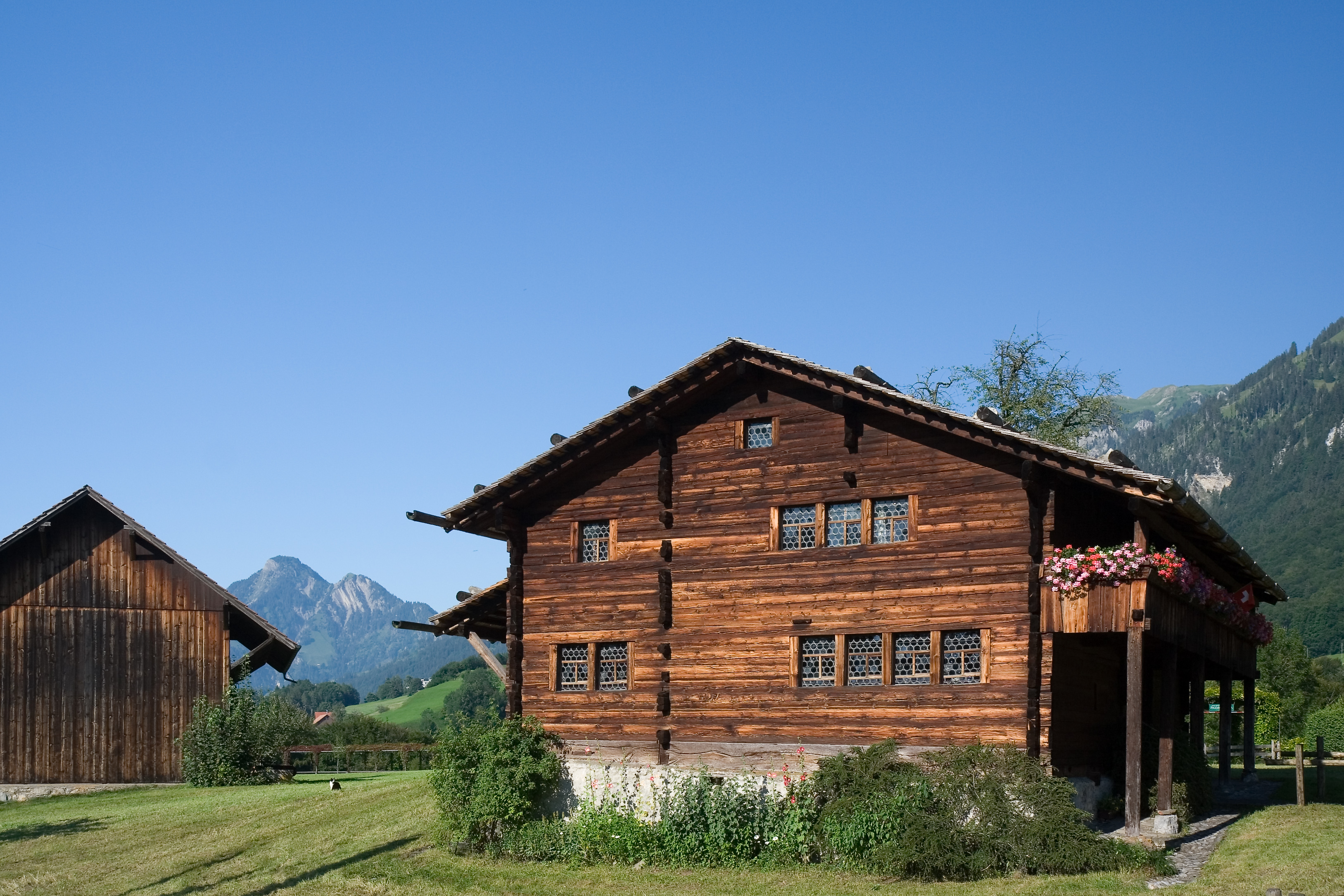
The house of Dorothea and Niklaus von Flüe in Flüeli-Ranft

Dorothea Wyss was born around 1430/32 in Obwalden. Although not much is known about her family background, she was most likely born into a relatively well-off family who made a living of farming. At the age of about 15 she married Niklaus von Flüe who was about 15 years older. Niklaus was often away as an adviser, but also as a warlord during the 1450s and 1460s Swiss wars. After twenty years of marriage and 10 children, her husband claimed that God calls him. Dorothea initially rejected her husband's request. Kläusli, the youngest child, was born some months before. Gradually, however, she took part in the vocation of her husband and gave her consent. On 16 October 1467 Niklaus von Flüe left his family as a pilgrim. Directed by visions, he soon returned and settled in the nearby Ranftschlucht, the gorge on the Melchaa, a stone's throw from his family's home. Dorothea now was responsible for the house, the farm and her family. She took care of her husband's family tasks, and the education of the younger children. The two older sons managed the farm.

Dorothea occasionally went down to the hermitage of Bruder Klaus (von Flüe's then popular name) to talk with him about domestic things or the education of the children. She personally convinced herself that her husband has found his inner peace. When her husband died in 1487, she was supposed to be there. She died after 1487 in Sachseln.

Dorothea allowed her husband to leave the family and start his life as a hermit, but the contemporary sources provide only rudimentary data. In 1488 she was described in the oldest biography of Bruder Klaus as a godly and extremely pious woman. Her first name is first mentioned in 1501, and around 1529 her surname in the female form Wyssin was first mentioned.

== Literature ==
- Werner T. Huber: Dorothea: Die Ehefrau des heiligen Nikolaus von Flüe. Auszüge aus dem Quellenmaterial über Bruder Klaus aus dem 15. Jahrhundert bis heute. Published by Bruder-Klausen-Stiftung in Sachseln, Academic Press, Fribourg 1994, ISBN 978-3727809859.
