= Parvalux =

British motor company

Coordinates: 50.7455°N 1.9936°W

- Industry: Manufacturing
- Products: fractional horsepower; geared; electric motors

Company Logo 2007

Parvalux Electric Motors Ltd is a British manufacturer of fractional horsepower geared electric motors. Based in Poole in Southern England. In December 2018, Parvalux was acquired by maxon motor AG.

== History ==
The name ‘Parvalux’ derives from the Latin 'parvulus' and 'lux' and means 'young light', alluding to the hopes that founder Leslie J. Clark had for the Romford-based business where he first began selling motor rewinds in 1947. After relocating to Bournemouth in 1957, the company moved from simply re-winding motors to designing and manufacturing complete gear-motor units for industrial applications.

Parvalux prospered for forty years through continued expansion of its product offer to cover a broad range of AC/DC electric motors and gearboxes, enabling the business to sell into a diverse range of markets and applications ― all over the world. In 2003, Steven Clark took over as Chief Executive.

In 2008 Parvalux acquired rival firm and DC motor application specialist EMD Drives Systems of Halstead, thereby creating the UK’s largest privately owned manufacturer of sub 1 kW electric motors and gearboxes. Until that time EMD had shared a similar history to Parvalux, initially winning recognition in the 1960s as volume AC motor supplier to household names such as Qualcast and Hotpoint, but then moved exclusively into DC products by the 1980s where they would compete directly with Parvalux for some 30 years. EMD was relocated in its entirety to the Bournemouth headquarters during 2009, with key members of the EMD staff relocating to join the newly merged business. The merger allowed Parvalux to offer products in much higher quantities than previously possible and cemented this position with a new 'product development and design' function (PDD).

The company has 185 employees in three production sites in Bournemouth, Dorset. Parvalux generates revenues of 23 million British pounds annually, with just over 40% being exported around the world.

== Applications ==
One notable application of a Parvalux product was documented as under test at the university of California in 1966 for inclusion on the cancelled Voyager program (Mars) mission.
The Brayebrook Observatory in Cambridgeshire uses two Parvalux AC induction gear-motor units to operate dome and shutter functions.
In 2006 Team Joker used a Parvalux unit as a servo motor on their combat robot 'Joker'.
Classic Flight cite Parvalux's PM60LWS as a component in a build-your-own motion base for flight simulation.

== Current Products ==
- Motors
  - Brushless DC electric motors
  - AC Induction motors
  - Variable speed AC/DC series wound or DC shunt wound motors (see Torque and speed of a DC motor)
  - Brushed DC electric motors (Permanent Magnet)
- Gearboxes
  - Worm drive
  - Epicyclic gearing - (planetary gearheads with integrated Permanent Magnet motors) New stand-alone 'HP' range released Autumn 2008
  - inline/right-angle gears
  - helical/spur gears
  - double reduction gears

Parvalux also now offers a fully bespoke OEM product design service for quantities over 5,000 units.
