= Parvulus =

Parvulus is a Latin adjective meaning small. It may refer to:

== People ==
- Self-imposed nickname of Konrad Haenisch, 1876–1925, German politician

== Other uses ==
- Parvulus, a Latin word commonly used in systematic names

== See also ==
- Parvalux, manufacturer of electric motors
