= World Scout Winter Games =

International winter sports event for Scouts

The World Scout Winter Games is an international winter sports event for Scouts.

== First World Scout Winter Games ==
The First World Scout Winter Games was held at Kandersteg International Scout Centre between February 28 and March 3, 2008. Nine teams, representing eight countries participated. The events included cross-country skiing, curling, slalom racing, synchronised skiing, and a triathlon. The overall winners were Sweden, with a team from Svenska Scoutrådet, the Swedish Guide & Scout Council.

== 2nd World Scout Winter Games ==
The 2nd World Scout Winter Games were to be held in 2010, also in Kandersteg, but had to be cancelled due to a low number of participating countries.

== See also ==
- Nordic Games
