= Kandersteg International Scout Centre =

International Scout centre in Kandersteg, Switzerland

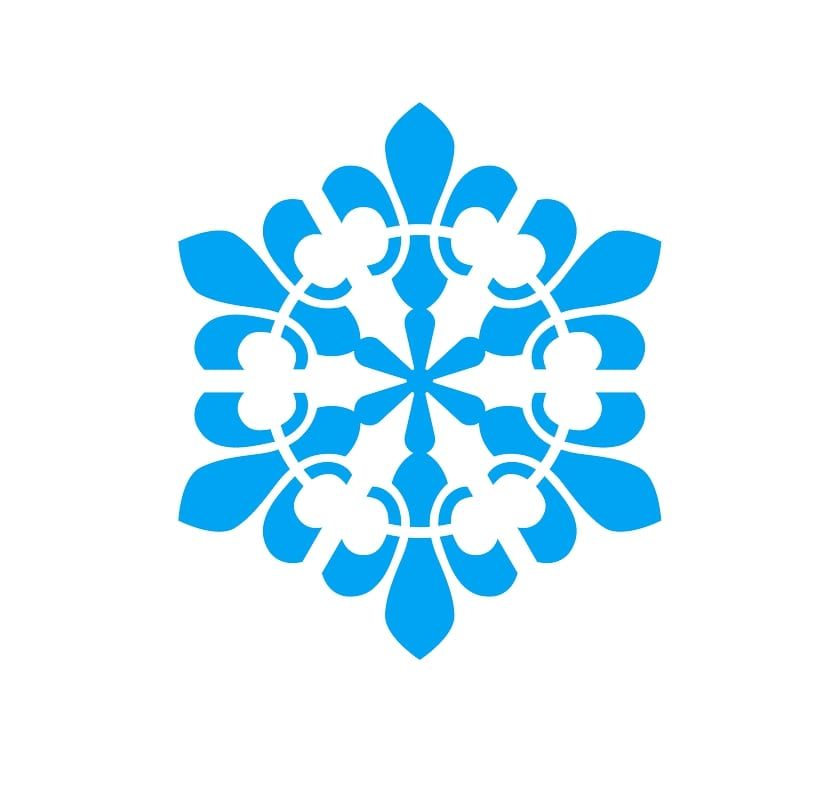
- Owner: The KISC Association
- Location: Kandersteg
- Country: Switzerland
- Coordinates: 46°29′0.18″N 7°39′50.1″E
- Camp size: 100,000 square metres (120,000 sq yd)
- Founded: February 12, 1923
- Founders: Walther von Bonstetten; Robert Baden-Powell
- Attendance: >17,000 annually
- Opened: May 21, 1923
- Affiliation: World Organization of the Scout Movement
- Website http://www.kisc.ch/

The Kandersteg International Scout Centre (KISC) is an international Scout centre in Kandersteg, Switzerland. The centre provides lodges, chalets and campsites covering 17 hectares of land. It is open to Scouts year round, as well as to non-Scouts for most of the year. More than 17,000 young people from over 50 countries visit the centre every year.

KISC is the World Organization of the Scout Movement's (WOSM) World Scout Centre.

== History ==
Picture of the campsite in the 1920s

In 1921 the Chief Scout of Switzerland, Walther von Bonstetten, visited Kandersteg on holiday and found an old empty chalet. It was built in 1908 to house the construction workers for the Lötschberg Tunnel. In 1913, when the tunnel was finished, the chalet was left unused by the railway company. Von Bonstetten felt that this location could be the permanent international meeting place that Robert Baden-Powell had in mind where Scouts from all over the world could meet. Von Bonstetten wrote to him to let him know what he had found. The response was positive and on 12 February 1923 the Scouts International Home Association was set up; on 12 April 1923 the chalet and adjacent land were bought for CHF 15,100, and the International Scout Centre came into existence. In 1930 Baden-Powell visited the site himself.

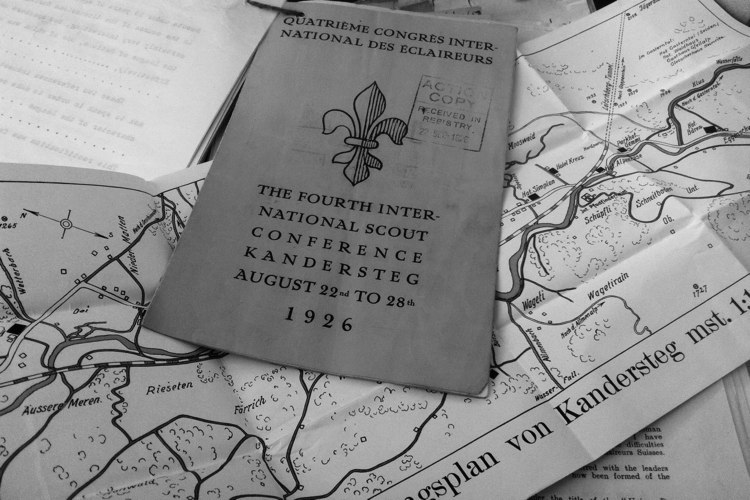
Flyer and map of Kandersteg distributed to the participants of the 4th International Scout Conference 1926.

Up to current times, the site has continuously been augmented, with the first national room, 'the Dutch room' in 1927, and the purchase of additional land in 1929. During World War II, the centre was used to house French soldiers interned for the war. In the 1950s more property was purchased, including the woods by the river Kander, and the centre began to open also in the wintertime. The centre was renamed Kandersteg International Scout Centre in 1977. In the 1980s, new campsites were created, together with extra toilet facilities, although the centre went through a difficult time financially. In 1994, the International Scout Centre Foundation, Kandersteg was established, and work started on the chalet extension project which opened on 1 June 1996. In December 2002, the top floor of the New Chalet was finished, completing the chalet extension, followed by new bathroom renovations two years later. In 2009, the centre opened a new accommodation building named Kanderlodge, purchased the neighbouring building, Sunneblick, and fully renovated the ground floor of the Old Chalet. During the COVID-19 outbreak in 2020, the centre had to close its doors for the first time since WWII. In 2021 KISC had to minimise many operations. The staff was reduced to only 5 people and the Chalet was completely closed.

== Location ==
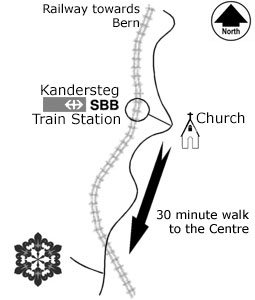
Map to KISC

The small, traditional Swiss village of Kandersteg (inhabitants approximately 1,200) is situated at 1,200 metres above sea level, 65 kilometres south of Bern, in the canton of Bern, near the Lötschenpass and the Gemmipass. The village is known for sightseeing and exploring the Swiss Alps. Kandersteg can be reached by road and rail: it is situated on the main railway line from the north to Italy, and the station is served by fast trains.

The Scout Centre is at the southern end of the village. During high season, a regular bus runs from the local railway station, which is free if one is wearing a Scout neckerchief.

== Facilities ==
=== Chalet ===
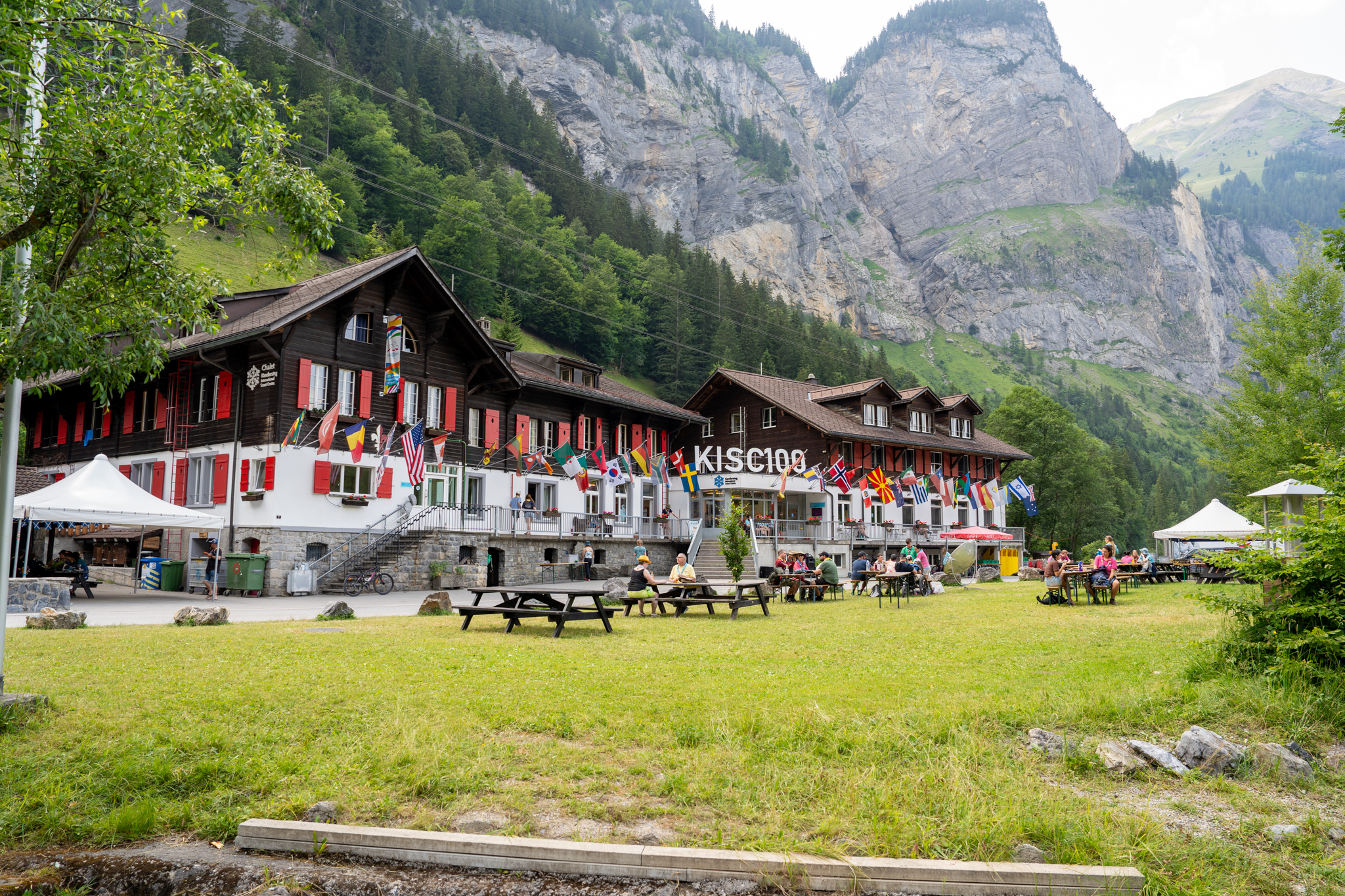

The central part of the centre is the chalet, which consists of two parts, the Old Chalet and the New Chalet. This building houses the centre reception and offices, as well as facilities for guests. The completion of the extension in 1996 greatly increased its size, and it has full central heating, modern sanitary facilities with constant hot water, a souvenir shop, meeting rooms, postal service, public telephones, a coffee bar, a laundry, a first aid room and internet facilities. There are five fully equipped electric kitchens available for use.

The Chalet is open all year round and is run along much the same lines as most Youth Hostels, with an emphasis on community life and cooperation. Guests help to look after and clean the building. The Chalet is decorated with neckerchiefs and plaques from guests, as well as photos, posters and badges showing the worldwide family of Scouting.

The Old Chalet provides accommodation for 172 people in 23 rooms, each with between 3 and 22 beds. Most rooms have tables and chairs, providing a living area. The rooms are named after National Scout Organizations or Scout Regions that have helped with renovating and decorating the room. The New Chalet provides new staff accommodation, meeting rooms and upgraded accommodation for 27 people in nine triple -bedded bedrooms available outside the summer season.

=== Campsite ===
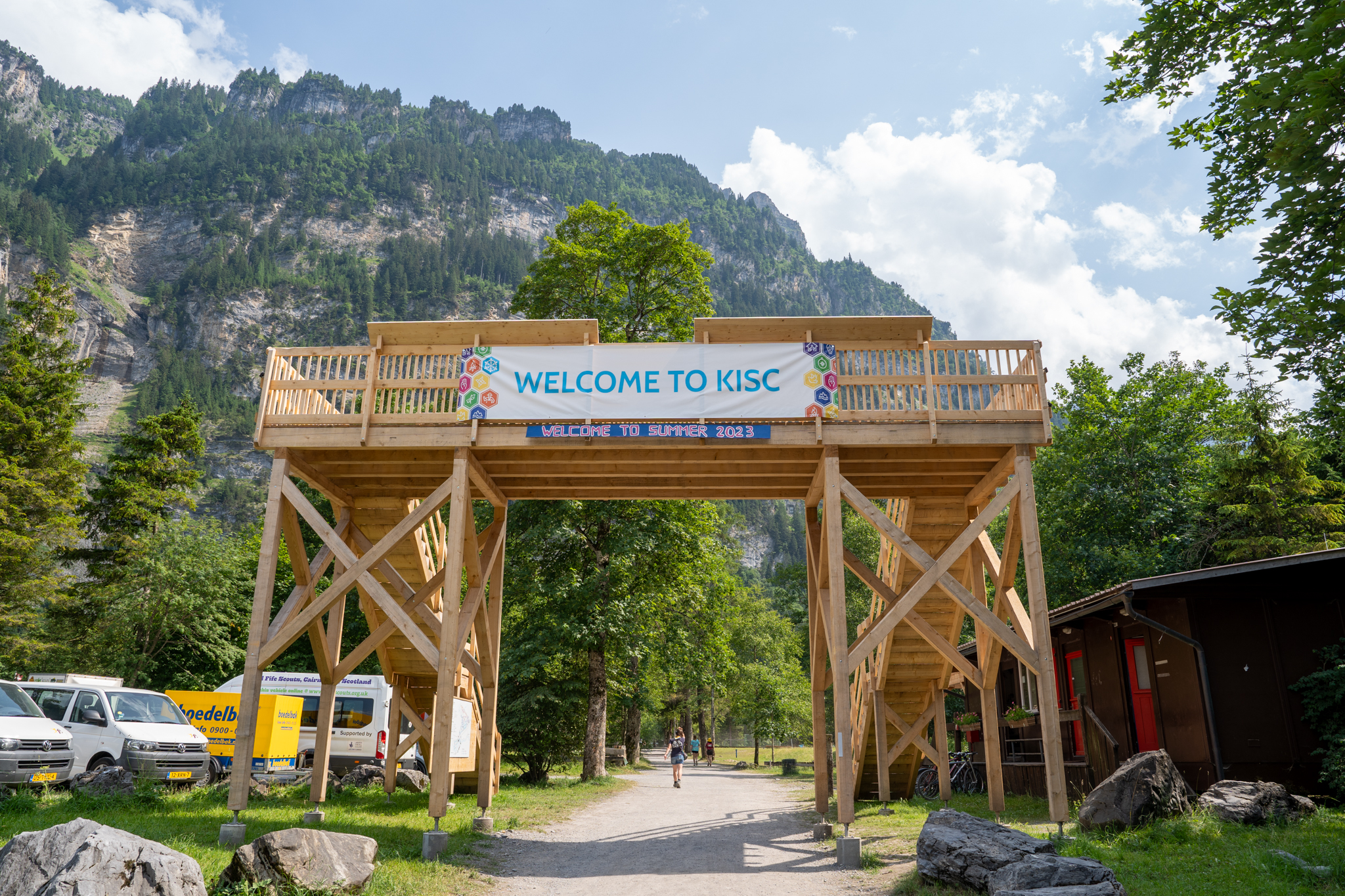
Campsite entrance

The campsite can accommodate up to 1,400 persons on more than 60 different sites. On average during the summer, the site has around 1000 guests at a time. While close to other groups, each group can be sure of their own campsite, ensuring both an international atmosphere and privacy. The sites have running water nearby and there are toilets and showers with hot water close at hand, which the visiting groups help to look after during their stay. There is a shop open on the campsite during the summer and a campsite office that is open most of the time. There is also a drying room and multiple picnic and barbecue facilities.

The campsite was originally wasteland from the construction of the tunnel, so several sites are rocky. The railway runs close to some of the sites, so it can be noisy at times.

In 2023, the Centre built a bridge as a campsite entrance. On top of the bridge is a gallery filled with historic events to celebrate the Centre's 100th anniversary.

=== Four buildings ===
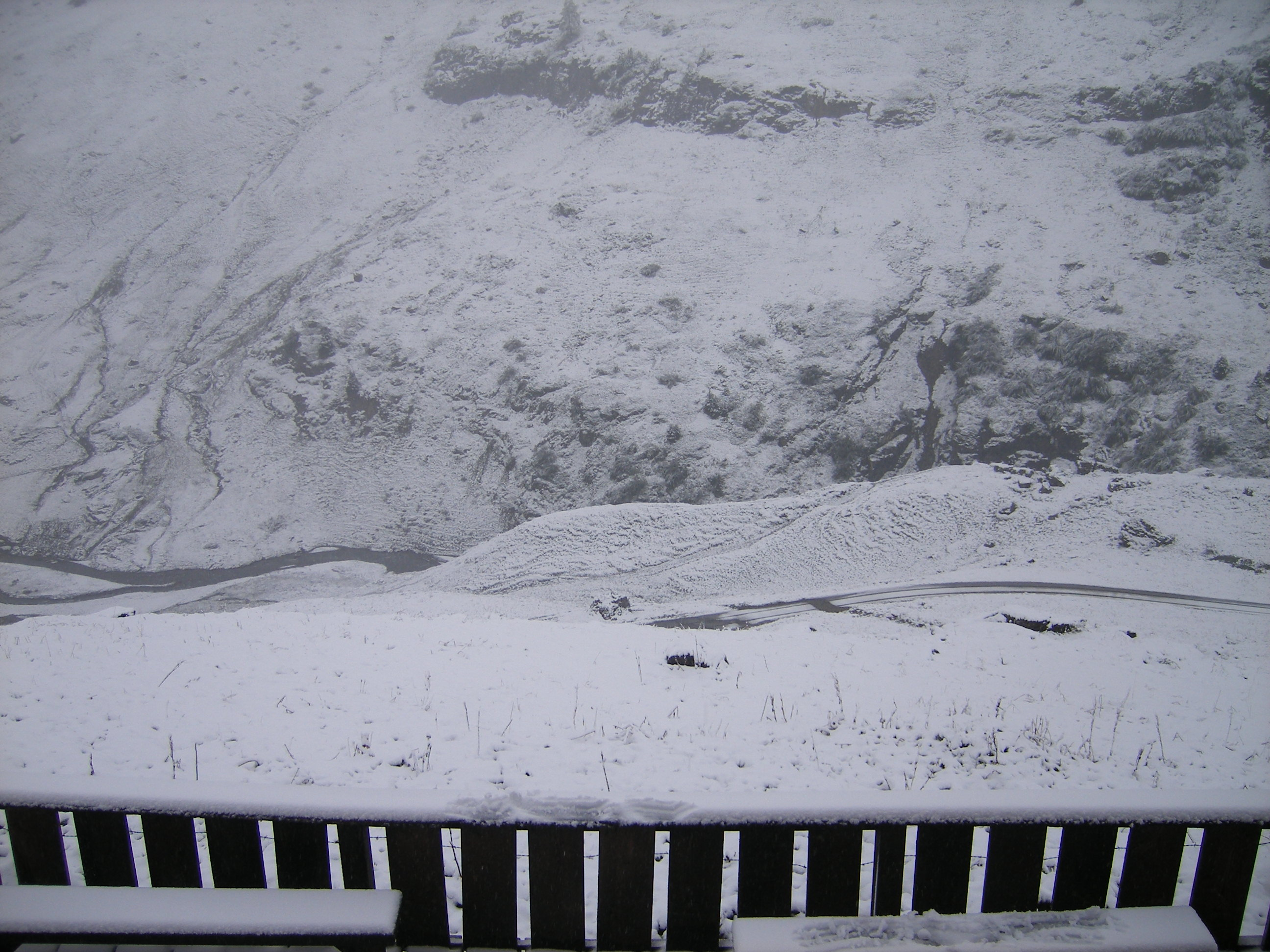
View from the Ueschinen hut

The Tower was originally the power station when the railway was built and now has two parts: the tower itself and the Lötschberghaus (sleeping building). In total there is accommodation for 57 people – four rooms with 12 beds in the Lötschberghaus and a newly renovated room with nine beds in the tower. Facilities include full toilet and shower facilities for boys and girls, a fully equipped electric kitchen and a big living room with an open fireplace and balcony.

On the other side of the river Kander is the Kander Lodge, facing the Chalet. It has eighteen simple 2-bed rooms with shared bathrooms. The building has a kitchen, dining room, living room and meeting room. The building was originally erected in the nearby village of Mitholz, and in recent decades used as office and exhibition space for the Lötschberg Base Tunnel. In 2008, after the tunnel was opened, the lodge was moved from Mitholz to its current site in Kandersteg.

Purchased in 2009, the Sunneblick is an old chalet with the same history as the Old Chalet and the Kander-Lodge. Originally it was an accommodation building for workers on the train tunnel in Frutigen. In the first quarter of the 20th century, it was moved from Frutigen to Kandersteg, to be the direct neighbour of the Old Chalet. The Sunneblick has 47 beds, a dining/play/meeting room, a fully equipped kitchen and a sitting room. It is available for use by a single group or can be rented as individual rooms.

The Ueschinen Hut is situated in the Ueschinen Valley, at a height of 1,890 metres, and about two to three hours' walk away from the centre. It is usually open from May to October. During the summer it is used mainly as a base for climbing and hiking activities, but it may be used by groups at any time if weather allows. The hut is actually half of a cowshed, so sometimes it is a bit noisy at night. It can sleep up to 30 people and has a fully equipped kitchen with wood stove, a general living and eating room and a special toilet – there is no electricity and no shower.

== Camps and activities ==
The site has a history of camps, starting with the 50th Gilwell Scout course, organized in 1926, and the 1st World Scout Moot with 2,500 Rover Scouts from 23 countries in 1931. After the war, in 1953, the 5th World Scout Moot was back in Kandersteg with 4,000 Rovers from 22 countries, and in 1992 again the 9th World Scout Moot saw nearly 2,500 people from over 50 countries.

In 1979, the site hosted Camp Kristall, with 1,700 Scouts from 42 countries. The camp was one of those that replaced the cancelled 15th World Scout Jamboree that year. In the 1970s and 1980s, the Transatlantic Council of the Boy Scouts of America used Kandersteg for annual and even more frequent camps. In 2007, the centre played host to KanderJam, 'The Alpine Link to the 21st World Scout Jamboree', which brought over 2,000 people from all over the world in celebration of the 100th anniversary of Scouting. The year after that, in 2008, the centre ran the first ever World Scout Winter Games.

The activity programme offered by the centre is based on three themes of International Friendship, High Adventure and Eco Adventure, designed to help guests learn, develop and have much fun. In the summer they offer, within the three themes, a fixed weekly in-camp programme including International Campfire, Pioneering Competition and BBQ, as well as a wide range of daily activities such as trails, nature workshops, hiking, rock climbing, crafts, mountain biking, paragliding, river rafting and trips to various parts of Switzerland. In the winter, the programme offers a range of alpine snow activities such as downhill or cross country skiing and snowboarding. There are also a variety of other activities in and around Kandersteg, like sledding, curling, ice skating, ice climbing and snow shoeing.

Throughout the year, Kandersteg offers programme activities for groups. Options vary with season and exact time of the visit. By participating in the programme, guests can work towards the award that exists for each of the themes. These are designed to bring together guests of all ages, nationalities and cultures, while encouraging them to experience, learn about and appreciate the alpine environment.

== Staff ==
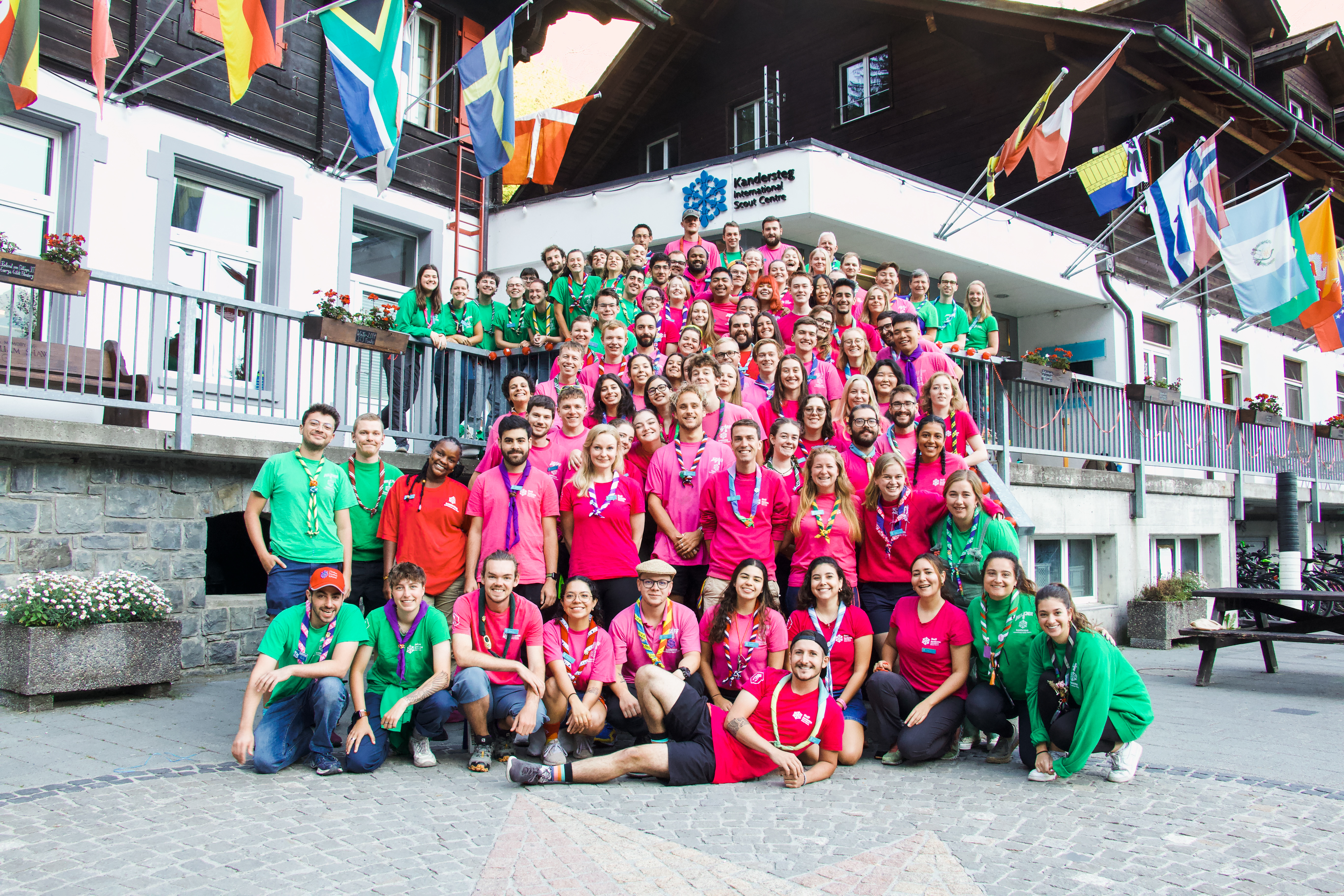
Kandersteg Staff (Pinkies)

In 1973, Kurt Metz was appointed as the first full-time director, thanks to the support of Kenneth Macintosh and the US Foundation for International Scouting. Since then the staff team has grown and operates throughout the year with the directors being assisted by deputy directors and an international team of volunteer staff staying from three months to several years. Volunteer staff are recruited in various numbers according to the time of year to assist with the running of the centre's facilities and the programme offered. The following is a list of KISC Directors (their country) and the year they took up the role.

- 1973: Kurt Metz (CH)
- 1978: Michael Mürwald (AT)
- 1982: Robert Agg (GB)
- 1984: Marc Lombard (CH)
- 1992: Aidan Jones (GB)
- 1996: John Moffat (GB)
- 2002: Miriam Herzberg (NL)
- 2005: Mark Knippenberg (NL)
- 2011: Myriam Heidelberger (CH)
- 2015: Felipe Marqueis (BR)
- 2019: Jack Higgins (GB)
- 2024: Javier "Pani" Petisco (ES)

Staff uniform colour used to change each year but from 1989 red became pink and never changed again. From then on the staff members were known as Pinkies. As well as their pink T-shirts and sweatshirt, they also wear a neckerchief to represent their Scouting background. Staff must meet three conditions: a minimum age of 18 on the day of starting work, ability to communicate in English, and membership in World Organization of the Scout Movement or World Association of Girl Guides and Girl Scouts.

Notable staff include Eddie "The Eagle" Edwards who worked as staff and trained in Kandersteg.

== Gallery ==
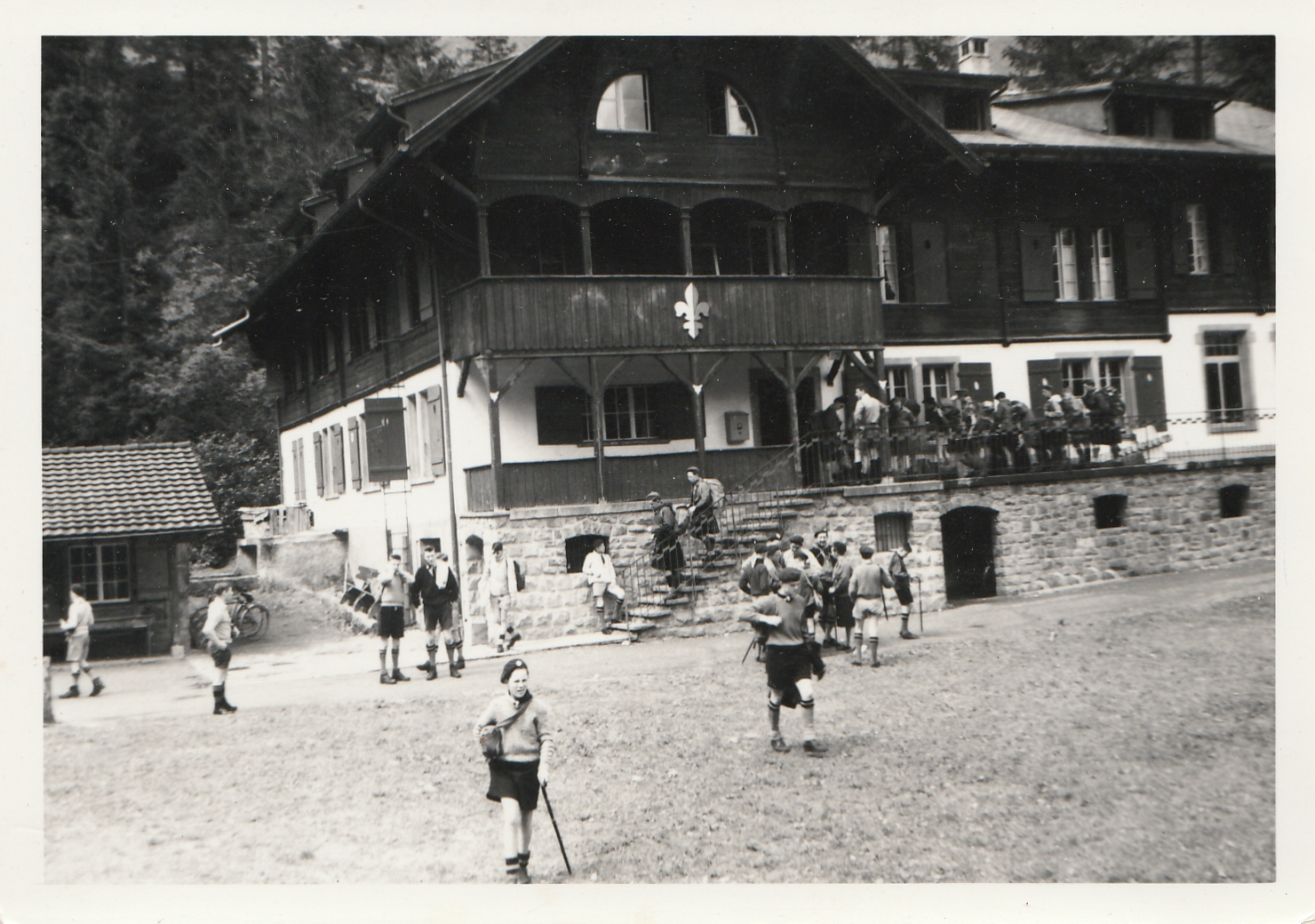
The International Scout Chalet, Kandersteg, 1961

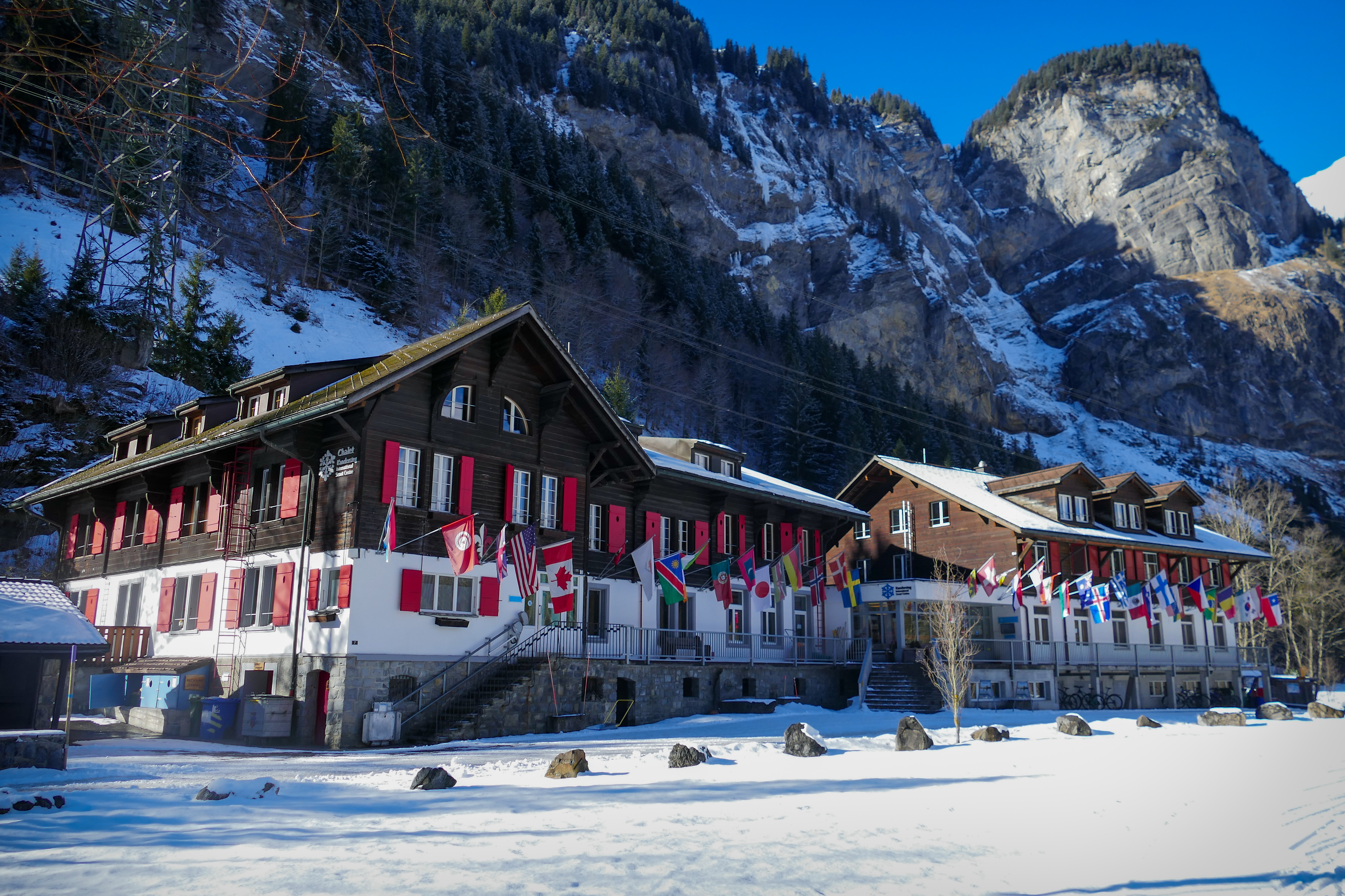
KISC during the Winter 2026 season.

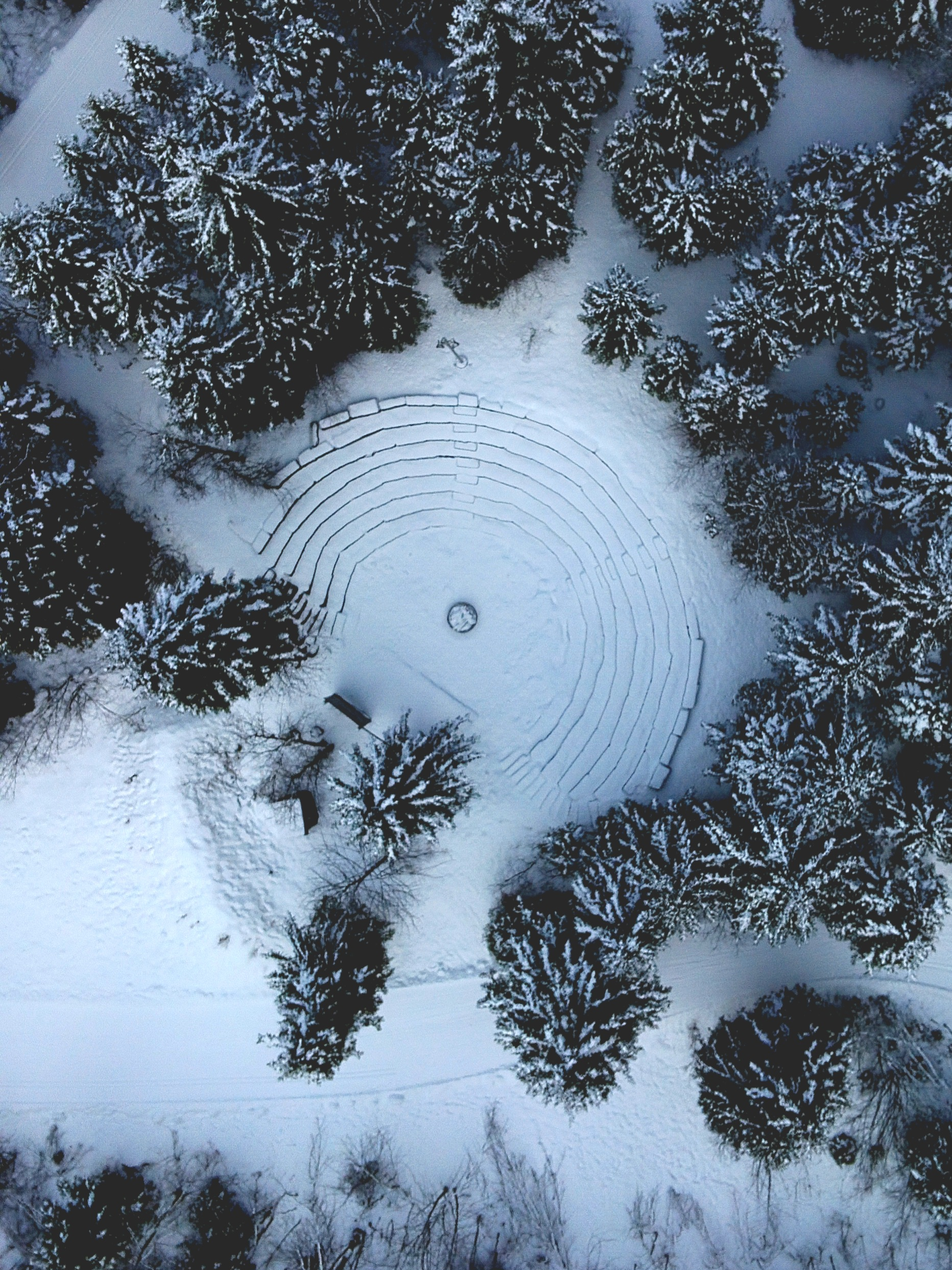
KISC campfire circle

== See also ==
- Brownsea Island, off Poole, United Kingdom
- Gilwell Park, in London, United Kingdom
- Our Chalet, in nearby Adelboden, Switzerland
