= Jan Knippenberg =

Dutch ultrarunner and historian (1948–1995)

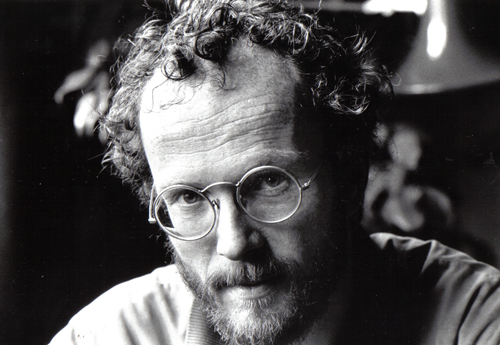
Jan Knippenberg

Jan Knippenberg (19 April 1948 – 23 November 1995) was a Dutch ultrarunner and historian. He was a pioneer of ultra-running in the Netherlands. In 1974 he ran from his hometown Hook of Holland to Stockholm (1600 km) in 18 days. In 1979 he ran the 400 km around the IJsselmeer-lake in 43 hours and 17 minutes - an unofficial world record. His marathon performances were moderate however. On 18 March 1979 he won the Groet Uit Schoorl (marathon) in 2:35.31.

Knippenberg was born in Hook of Holland, moved from Castricum to Texel in 1984, and became a history teacher, consecutively connected to the Casimir College in Vlaardingen, the Bonhoeffer College in Castricum and OSG De Hogeberg on Texel. He also made a voyage to the islands of Spitsbergen in 1988 by sailing ship and lived among the reindeer in Scotland.

Knippenberg wrote columns in the Dutch edition of Runner's World magazine. In the 1980s he was a member of the editorial board of Op Lemen Voeten, a Dutch magazine for long-distance hikers. He also wrote a book De mens als duurloper (Man as endurance runner; 1987). In this work he supplemented historical information about ultra-running, in which he strongly leaned on the book Indian Running by the American author Peter Nabokov (1981), with added personal experiences. In 2008 an edition revised by his son Mikel Knippenberg was published.

On the island of Texel, Knippenberg regularly organized the Ronde van Texel or Texel round trip (60 km).

In 1995 it turned out that he suffered from incurable cancer.

Knippenberg died of cancer in Texel, at the age of 47.

The Jan Knippenberg Memorial is a Dutch ultra-running event that was held several times in commemoration of this Dutch pioneer, a race over one hundred English miles from Hook of Holland over the Dutch North Sea beaches to Den Helder.

== Works ==
- De mens als duurloper, Eerste druk, Jan Knippenberg, 1987, ISBN 90-6120-590-5
- De mens als duurloper, Tweede druk, Erven Jan Knippenberg, 2008, ISBN 978-90-446-1157-1

== Sources ==
- Hendriks, H. (1974): Jan Knippenberg liep op eigen benen van Hoek van Holland naar Stockholm (ca. 1400 km) in 19 dagen De Atletiekwereld nr. 16: KNAU
- Roeleven, D. J. (2007): Forrest Gump op Texel, in Achilles01 - Sportverhalen van toen en nu, 2007. Ad van Liempt & Jan Luitzen: Uitgeverij L.J. Veen te Amsterdam ISBN 978 90 204 0868 3
- ARRS
