= Maurice Machenbaum =

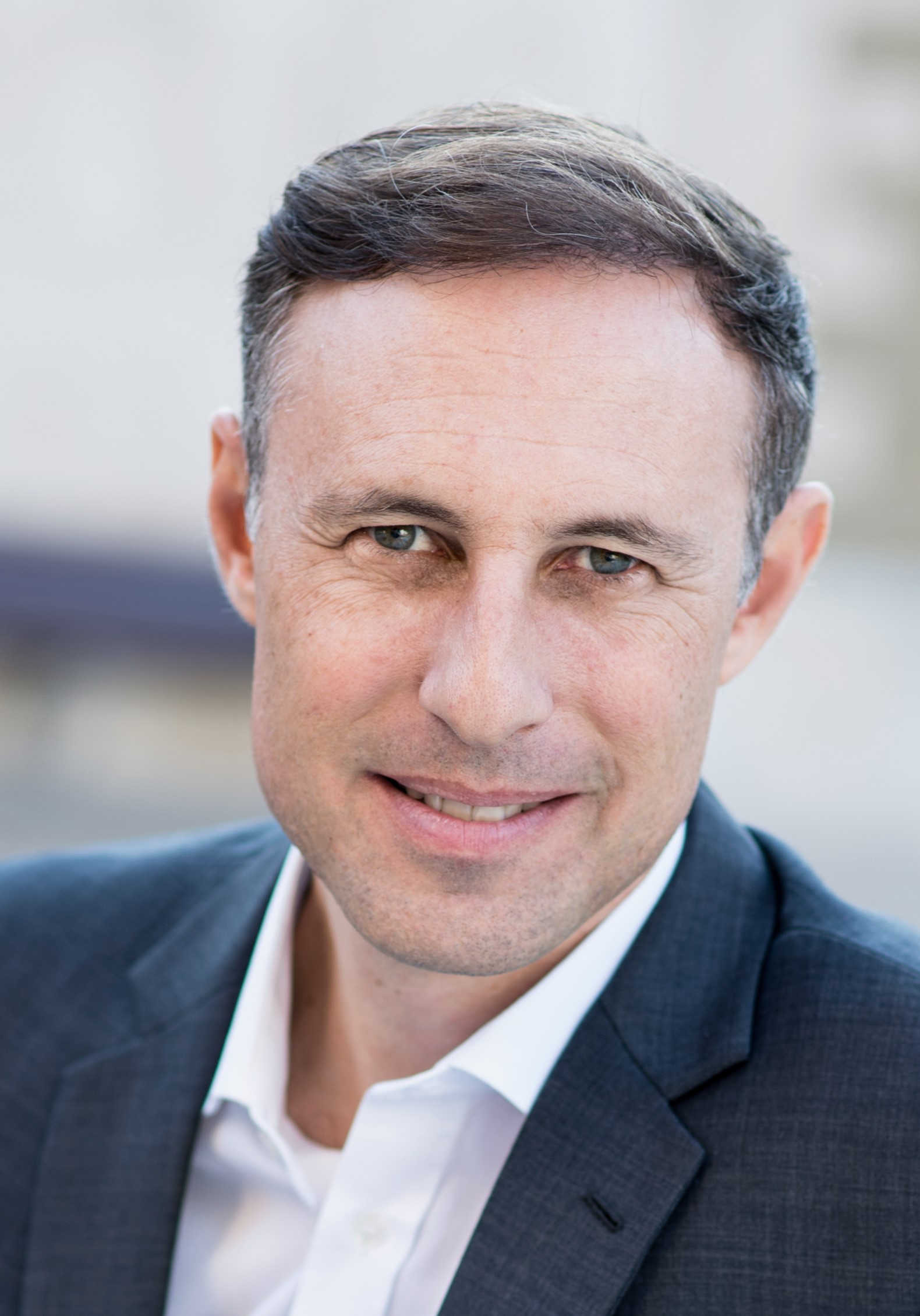

Treasurer of the World Scout Committee
- In office 2007–2013

Maurice Machenbaum (born August 7, 1970) is a Swiss social development and project management expert and philanthropy advisor. He was the appointed treasurer of the World Scout Committee, the main executive body of the World Organization of the Scout Movement, from 2007 to 2013.

Machenbaum has been a Cub Scout leader, Scout Group leader, trainer of Cub Scout leaders and founder of Scout groups of street children (boys and girls) in Tegucigalpa, Honduras. He participated in the 1995, 1999, 2007 and 2011 World Jamborees, among other international events.

Machenbaum is a Swiss citizen, a graduate in Law with a Master's degree in Humanitarian Action from the University of Geneva. He started his career in 1994 as Street Educator with the non-governmental organization Casa Alianza in Honduras, an international NGO dedicated to the defense and rehabilitation of street children in Central America and Mexico. In 1995, he became Assistant to the Executive Director for Latin America and in 1998, he founded Casa Alianza in Nicaragua and became its Program Director. He was subsequently in charge of research on the topic of child soldiers at the International Committee of the Red Cross. In 2000 he became Program Director for Latin America and the Caribbean for Terre des hommes Lausanne, Switzerland's largest independent child-focused NGO.

In 2004 Machenbaum and Etienne Eichenberger founded WISE, a philanthropy advisor company, which facilitates links between wealthy individuals and social entrepreneurs. He left the company in 2022.

He was the co-founder and board member of Swiss Philanthropy Foundation from 2016 to 2022; used to be member of the board of Médecins du Monde Switzerland from 2010 to 2013 and currently serves on the board of Cansearch Foundation (focussing on children's cancer research), a foundation he also co-founded.
