= Albrecht von Bonstetten =

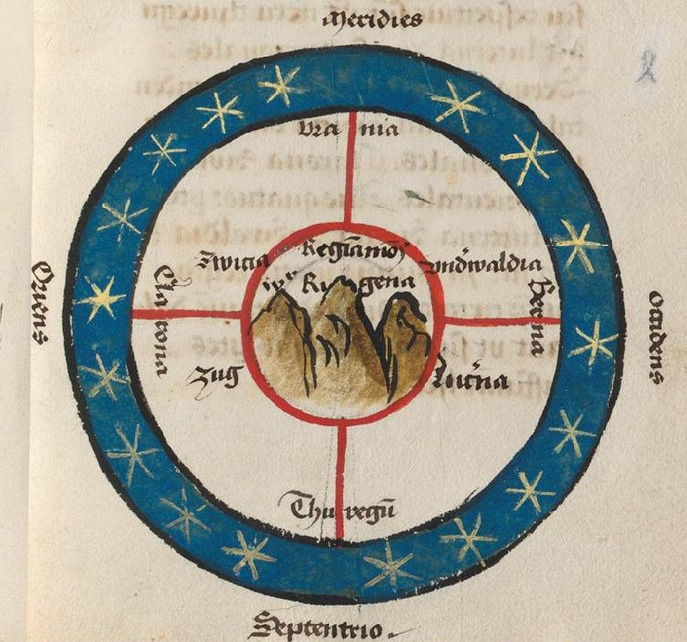
Diagram of the geographical situation of the Swiss Confederacy from Superioris Germaniae Confoederationis descriptio (1479/80): centered on Regina mons (Rigi), Urania is to the south, Zwicia, Zug and Claronia to the east, Underwaldia, Lucerna and Berna to the west and Thuregum to the north.

Albrecht von Bonstetten (c. 1443-c. 1504) was a Swiss humanist of the later 15th century. A member of the baronial von Bonstetten family, he entered Einsiedeln Abbey at a young age, and after studies in Fribourg and Basel he returned to Einsiedeln and was made deacon in 1469. He studied canon law at Pavia and was ordained a priest in 1474, and he received the title of doctor utriusque iuris from Emperor Maximilian in 1498. He published a biography on Nicholas of Flüe called Historia fratris Nicholai in 1479.

He is the author of a number of religious and historiographical works in Latin. His Superioris Germaniae Confoederationis descriptio (written in 1479) is the oldest geographic description of the Old Swiss Confederacy (called by von Bonstetten the "Upper German Confederacy"; the adoption of the name of Schwyz developed after his time). The work was presented to the king of France and the Doge of Venice in 1479, and was combined with a description of Burgundy in a new edition for pope Sixtus IV in 1480. Also in 1480, the work appeared in German translation, as Obertütscheit Eidgnosschaft stett und lender gelägenheit. It was edited by Gall Morel in 1847.
