= Maxon Group =

Swiss manufacturer of electric motor drive systems

Maxon Motor AG
- Maxon Group logo, as of July 2019
- Trade name: Maxon Group
- Formerly: Interelectric AG (1961-1999), maxon motor AG (1999-2019)
- Industry: Drive technology
- Founded: 1961; 65 years ago in Sachseln, Switzerland
- Headquarters: Switzerland
- Area served: 40 countries worldwide
- Key people: Karl-Walter Braun (majority shareholder); Eugen Elmiger (CEO)
- Production output: 5 million units and approx. 12,000 variations
- Brands: Parvalux Electric Motors Ltd; zub machine control AG;
- Owner: Karl-Walter Braun (majority shareholder)
- Number of employees: 3,000
- Website: maxongroup.com

Maxon Group is a Swiss manufacturer of electric motor drive systems, consisting of AC motors, DC motors, encoders, gears, motor controllers, and sensors.

== History ==
Maxon began in December 5, 1961, as Interelectric AG. After the factory building in Sachseln was completed in 1963, Interelectric began producing shearing foils for Braun GmbH, specifically for their electric shavers. At that time, there were 17 employees. The basis of the company was a technical process called galvanoplasty, or electroforming. Soon afterward, a separate development department for electromechanical devices was created.

In 1967, Braun was sold to Gillette. Following up on the work on DC motors that had been carried out in the company's R&D department, the engineers were able to develop an entire range of models for DC motors. At the same time, the engineers in Sachseln patented the manufacturing process for the ironless rotor with the diamond-shaped winding. In 1970, the DC Motors were registered under the trademark 'Maxon'. In 1999, the company restructured and rebranded as Maxon Motor AG.

In 2012, the company started offering DC motor drive configuration tooling through its website. In 2017, the company acquired Zub motion control AG, based in Lucerne, Switzerland. Parvalux Electric Motors Ltd based in Poole, UK, was also acquired by Maxon Motor AG in 2018.

In July 2019, the company re-branded simply as 'Maxon'.

== Products ==
The company developed and patented its ironless winding system. Its motors are available as either brushless or brushed, with graphite brushes or precious metal brushes. A section of its brushless DC motor program is available as flat (pancake) build for use in restricted space envelopes. The types of gearheads available are spur gearheads and planetary gearheads made of plastic, ceramic (zirconium dioxide and aluminum aluminum oxide), or stainless steel. The company core business mainly deals in combination drive units to suit high-precision applications. Accompanying the core business of electric motors, a range of position encoders and two programs of motor control electronics are sold, and with the acquisition of Parvalux, AC motors are now included by the group via this subsidiary industrial practice.

== Application areas ==
The company specializes in customer-specific drives. It produces more than 5 million drive units per year and 12,000 different variations. Its main market areas are aerospace, automotive, communication, industrial automation, measuring and testing, medical, and security technologies.

Maxon became popular when its products were chosen by NASA for the Mars rover projects Sojourner, Spirit, Opportunity, and Perseverance.

== Locations ==
Maxon has its headquarters, along with a production plant, in Sachseln, within the Swiss Canton of Obwalden. The company gives its name to the railway station, Ewil Maxon, that adjoins the plant and has frequent connections to the city of Lucerne and farther.

Besides its Sachseln plant, Maxon has production facilities at Sexau in Germany, Veszprém in Hungary, Cheonan in South Korea, and Taunton, Massachusetts. Sales operations exist in Switzerland, Germany, United Kingdom, the US, Australia, Spain, Italy, Benelux, India, Japan, Mainland China, Taiwan and South Korea, and there are sales agents in numerous other countries.
