= Mark Knippenberg =

Chief Executive Officer of the World Scout Foundation
- Incumbent
- Assumed office 2021

Mark Knippenberg (born 5 July 1967) has been Chief Executive Officer of the World Scout Foundation since 2021.

Knippenberg was the director at Kandersteg International Scout Centre (KISC) from November 2005 until late 2010. After that he assumed the role of Deputy Director of the World Scout Foundation from 2010 to 2021, before becoming CEO.

== Career ==
Knippenberg first worked at KISC as Deputy Director for Guest Services in 2001 to 2003 when he then took on the role of Deputy Director for Internal Services until 2005. He briefly left the centre to work as Director of Adult Resources at the World Scout Bureau before returning in November 2005 to become Director. One of the major projects he was involved in as director at KISC was the creation of the KanderLodge building in 2008/09.

Knippenberg is also on the planning team for the European Center Managers’ Conference which aims to strengthen and develop co-operation among Guide and Scout Centres and to facilitate strong working relations between the staff of those centres. He is also the sole director and co-ordinator of the Goose Network which improves the quality of environmental, nature and cultural activities at European Scout and Guide Centres.

He was previously an officer in the Royal Netherlands Navy.

== See also ==
- Kandersteg International Scout Centre
