= Charles Victor de Bonstetten =

Swiss writer (1745–1832)

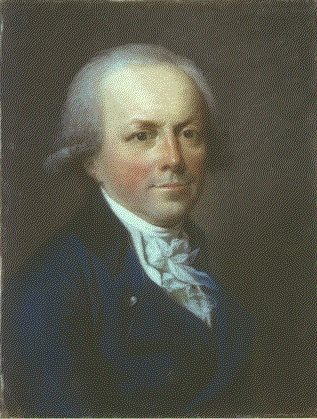
- Born: 3 September 1745; Bern, Swiss Confederacy
- Died: 3 February 1832 (aged 86)
- Occupation: Writer

Charles Victor de Bonstetten (German: Karl Viktor von Bonstetten; 3 September 1745 – 3 February 1832) was a Swiss liberal writer.

== Life ==
Charles Victor was born at Bern in Switzerland to one of its great patrician families on 3 September 1745. He began his education there before traveling at age 14 to Yverdon. He studied at Geneva from 1763 to 1766 at Geneva, where he came under the influence of Jean-Jacques Rousseau and Charles Bonnet and imbibed liberal sentiments. His father, intending to fit him for a career as a Bernese senator of the traditional type, was alarmed at the tone of his letters from Geneva and recalled his son to Bern. He obeyed but his distaste for Bernese life led him to attempt suicide by pistol. Supposedly, he was distracted by a moonbeam at the moment of discharge and survived to be sent by his father to Leiden to continue his studies.

As the climate of Leiden disagreed with him, he was permitted to travel to England in 1769, where he made many friends including the poet Thomas Gray. He returned home via Paris where he was introduced to its literary society. At home, he nursed his father during the illness which killed him in 1770. Following his father's death, he immediately traveled to Italy, where he reached as far south as Naples. No longer a revolutionary but still a liberal, he returned to Bern in 1774 and entered its political life.

He began his political career as a member of the avoyer's council and acted as the patron of the historian Johannes von Müller. He was soon appointed as bailiff over Gessenay, possibly leaving it in 1779 for Saanen. ambiguity He published his Pastoral Letters (Lettres pastorales sur une contrée de la Suisse) in German in 1781. In 1787, he was transferred to Nyon near the French border. He enjoyed the location but was distrusted both by his former liberal friends and his conservative peers. He was obliged to retire after taking part in a celebration of the storming of the Bastille in 1791 and—probably simply owing to his lack of military training—misdirecting the guards under his command when the area was threatened by the army of the Convention the next year. From 1795 to 1797, he served as bailiff of the Italian-speaking districts of Lugano, Locarno, Mendrisio, and Val Maggia in the Ticino valley. He is credited with introducing the region to the potato.

The French invasion of Switzerland and establishment of the Helvetic Republic in 1798 drove Bonstetten once more into private life. At the invitation of Madame Brun, he resided in Copenhagen, Denmark, until 1801. He then traveled to Italy before settling in Geneva for the remainder of his life. He resided there uneventfully but in the society of many distinguished people, including Madame de Staël. His most celebrated book—Men of the South and of the North (L'Homme du midi et l'homme du nord)—was published during this era, arguing that climate was responsible for the superiority of northern Europe over the south, but his own writing generally fell into low esteem. Instead, he is principally remembered for his social character—as a conversationalist, and as the friend, often the intimate companion of many of the more celebrated leaders of thought and action during his long life.

== Works ==
- Briefe über ein schweizerisches Hirtenland, 1782
- The Hermit (L'Hermite; 1792)
- Lesser Writings (Kleine Schriften, 1799–1801)
- On National Education (Über Nationalbildung, 1802)
- Trip to the Scene of the Last 6 Books of the Aeneid, with Some Observations on Modern Latium (Voyage sur la scène des six derniers livres de l’Enéide, suivi de quelques observations sur le Latium moderne, 1805)
- Research on the Nature and Laws of the Imagination (Recherches sur la nature et les lois de l’imagination, 1807)
- Thoughts on the Diverse Objects of Public Goods (Pensées sur divers objets de bien public, 1815)
- Studies on Man, or, Research on the Faculties of Thought and Thinking (Études sur l’homme ou recherches sur les facultés de sentir et de penser, 1821)
- Man of the South and Man of the North, or, The Influence of Climates (L’Homme du midi et l’homme du nord ou l'influence des climats, 1824)
- Scandinavia and the Alps (La Scandinavie et les Alpes, 1826)
- Recollections Written in 1831 (Souvenirs écrits en 1831, 1831)

== See also ==
- Switzerland in the Napoleonic era
- Swiss literature
