= Walther von Bonstetten =

World Scout Committee member

Walther von Bonstetten (June 5, 1867 in Bern – November 4, 1949) was among the founders and most important members of the Swiss Boy Scout association Schweizer Pfadfinderbund, was elected President (Zentralpräsident des SPB) in 1918 and kept a leading role until 1942.

== Biography ==
He studied law and then became attached to the Swiss embassy in Berlin and then in London. It is there that he came into contact with the Scout movement in its beginnings and with Baden-Powell. On his return to Switzerland he founded the first group in Geneva. In 1913, he was among the founders of the Pfadicorps Patria in Bern, one of the early Swiss Scout units.

From 1918 to 1927, he served as President of the Swiss Boy Scouts. He founded the "Scouts International Home" Association in 1923, later to be known as Kandersteg International Scout Centre.

He served as Chief Scout of Switzerland from 1927 to 1934. In 1928, he received the Silver Buffalo Award from the National Court of Honor of the Boy Scouts of America for remarkable and extraordinary achievements for the youth. From 1934 to 1942 he served as President of the Swiss Boy Scouts.

He was awarded the Bronze Wolf, the only distinction of the World Organization of the Scout Movement, awarded by the World Scout Committee for exceptional services to world Scouting, in 1937. He became President d´Honneur of the Scouts Alpine Club in 1946.

Von Bonstetten served on the International Scout Committee of the World Organization of the Scout Movement from 1927 until 1947. He served one year as Honorary Vice-President of the International Committee until his death in 1949.
