= Estació del Nord =

Estació del Nord may refer to:

- Estació del Nord (Barcelona), a former railway station and current bus station in Barcelona, Spain
- Estació del Nord (Valencia), a railway station in Valencia, Spain

== See also ==
- Media related to Estació del Nord at Wikimedia Commons
- North Station (disambiguation)
- Estación del Norte (disambiguation)
- Nordbahnhof (disambiguation)
- Gare du Nord (disambiguation)
