= Alpnach Dorf railway station =

Railway station in Switzerland

Alpnach Dorf
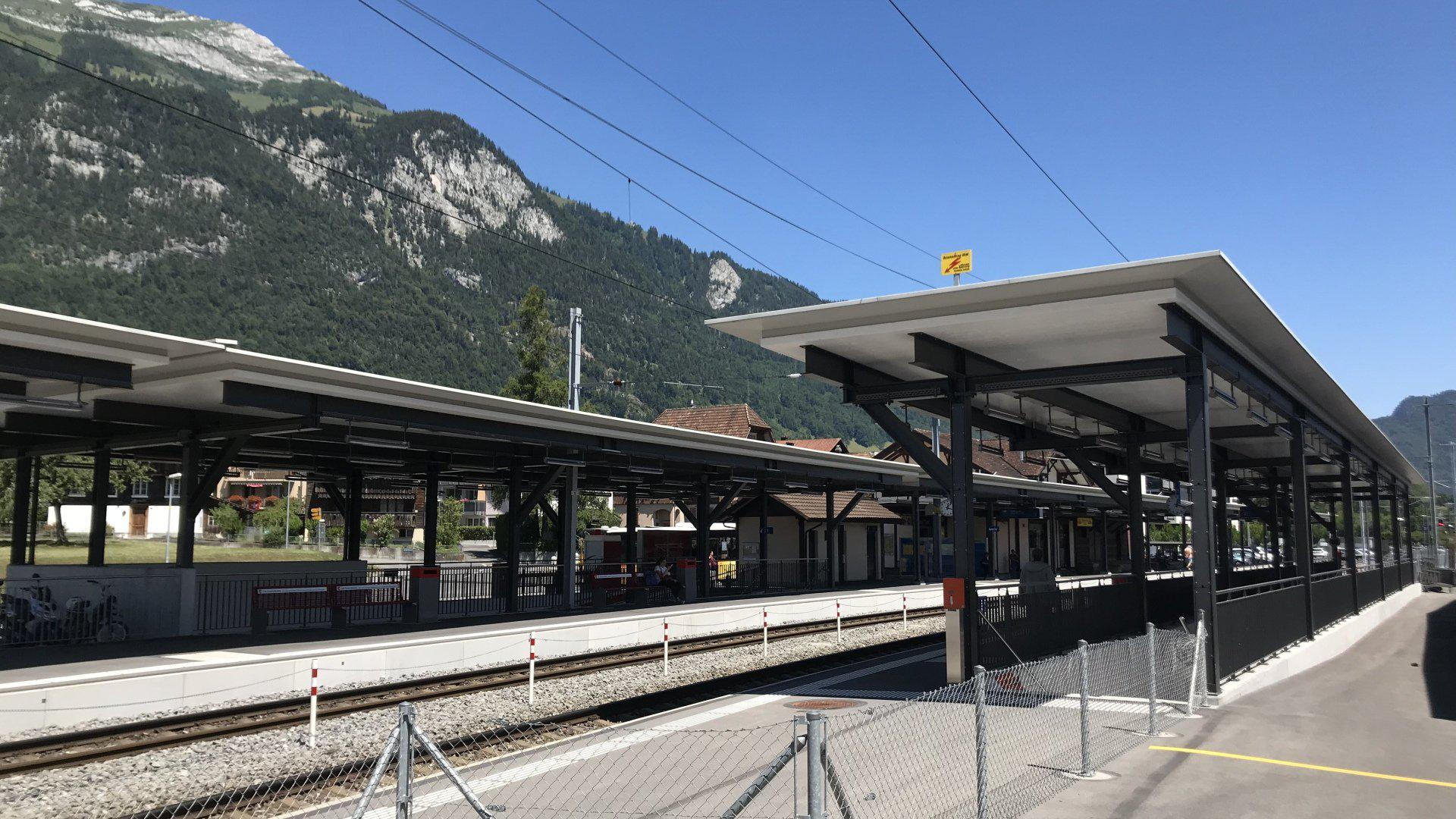
- The station platforms in 2018

General information
- Location: Bahnhofplatz; Alpnach; Switzerland
- Coordinates: 46°56′26″N 8°16′31″E
- Elevation: 452 m (1,483 ft)
- Owner: Zentralbahn
- Line: Brünig line
- Train operators: Zentralbahn

Services
Preceding station	Lucerne S-Bahn	Following station
Sarnen Nord towards Giswil	S5	Alpnachstad towards Lucerne
Sarnen towards Sachseln	S55	Hergiswil towards Lucerne
Location
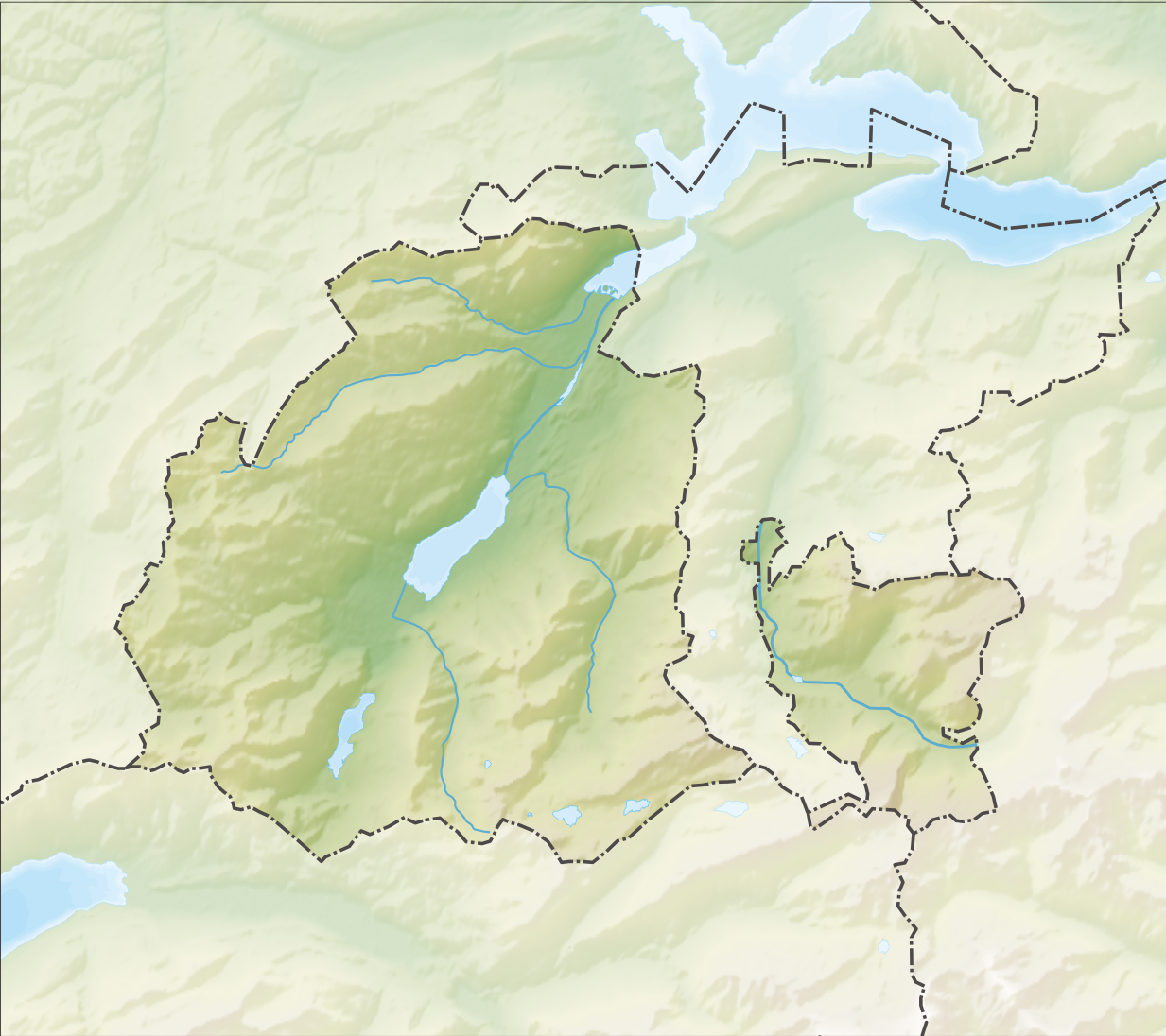
- Location within Switzerland Location within Canton of Obwalden

Alpnach Dorf railway station is a Swiss railway station in the municipality of Alpnach in the canton of Obwalden. It is on the Brünig line, owned by the Zentralbahn, that links Lucerne and Interlaken.

Alpnach Dorf station is one of two stations to serve Alpnach, the other being Alpnachstad, which is on the Brünig line some 1.5 kilometres (0.93 mi) to the north.

== Services ==
The following services stop at Alpnachstad:

- Lucerne S-Bahn:
  - S5: half-hourly service between Lucerne and Giswil.
  - S55: rush-hour service between Lucerne and Sachseln.
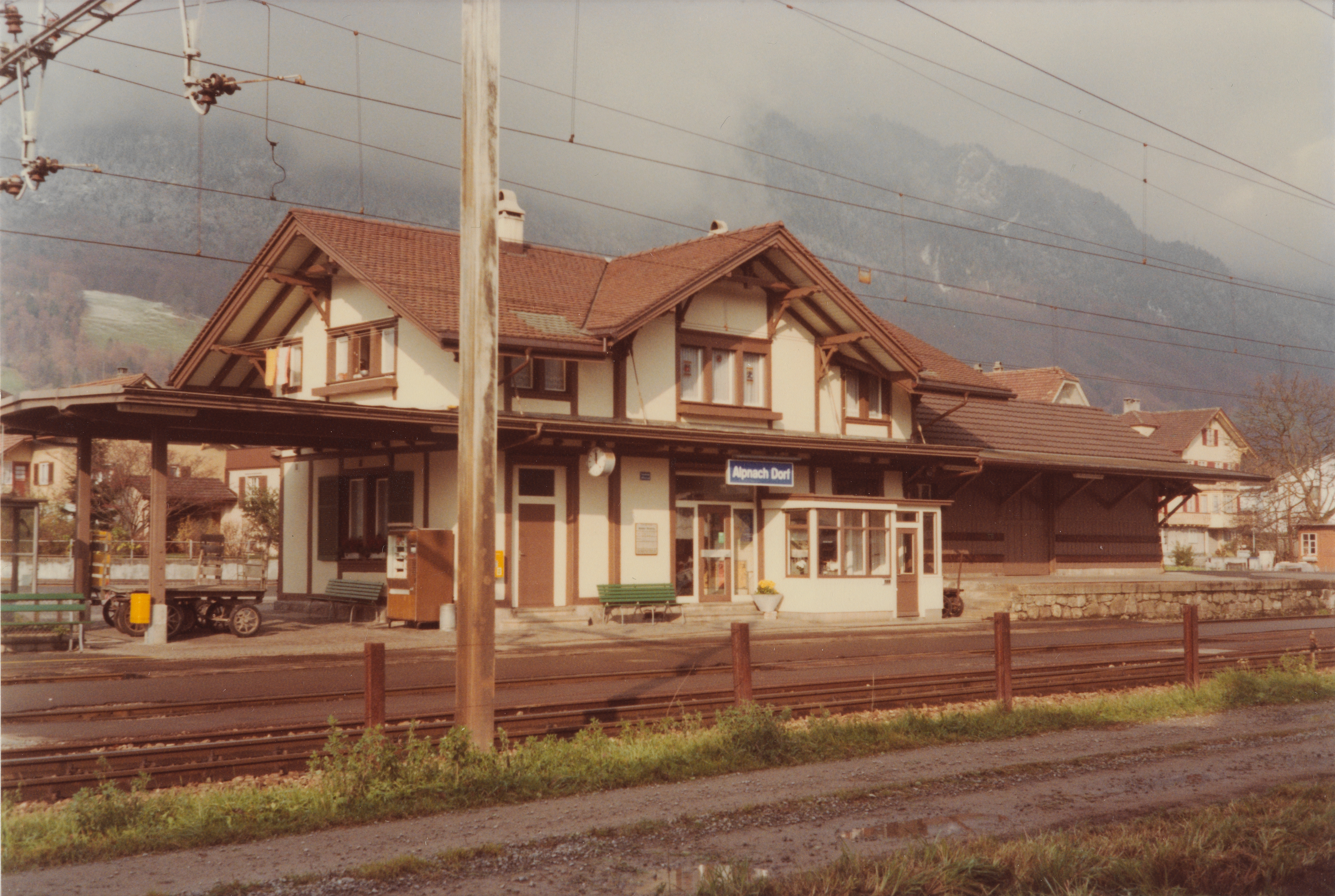
The station building in 1981
