= Alpnachstad railway station =

Railway station in Alpnachstad, Switzerland

Alpnachstad
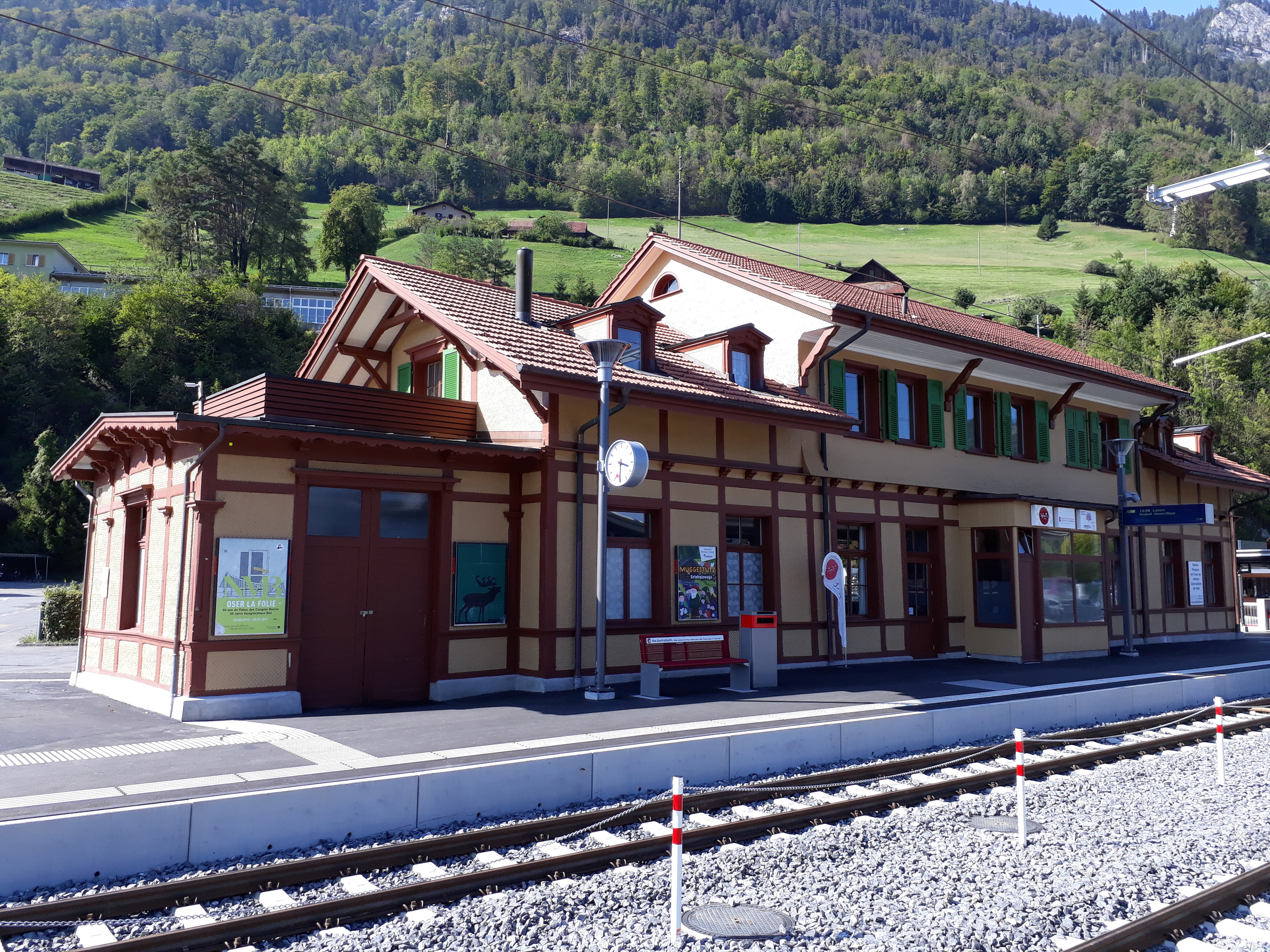
- The station building in 2018

General information
- Location: Bahnhofplatz; Alpnachstad; Switzerland
- Coordinates: 46°57′18″N 8°16′40″E
- Owner: Zentralbahn
- Line: Brünig line
- Train operators: Zentralbahn
- Connections
- Ship: SGV on Lake Lucerne
- Train: rack railway to Pilatus

Services
Preceding station	Lucerne S-Bahn	Following station
Alpnach Dorf towards Giswil	S5	Hergiswil towards Lucerne
Location
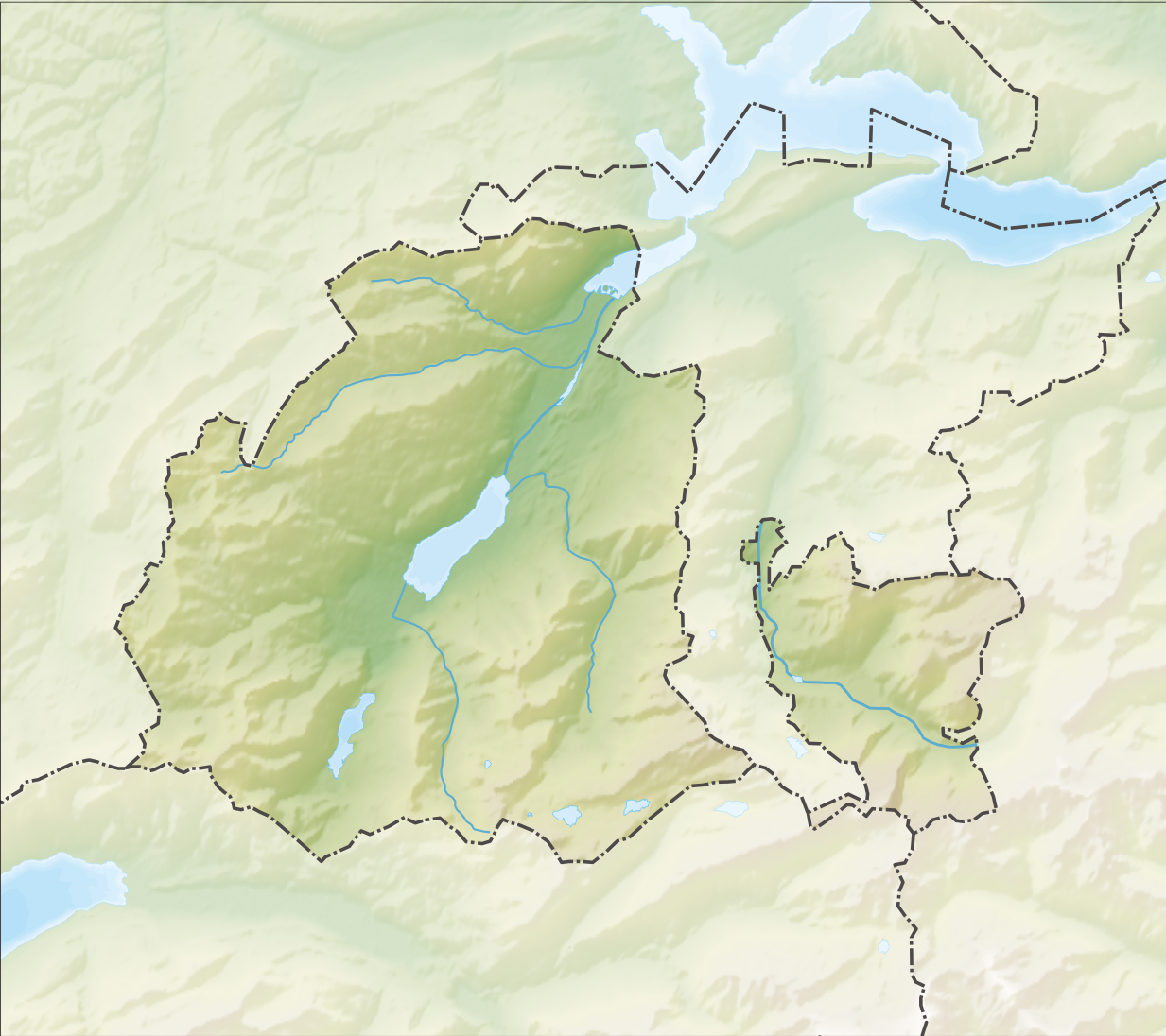
- Location within Switzerland Location within Canton of Obwalden

Alpnachstad railway station is a Swiss railway station in the municipality of Alpnach in the canton of Obwalden. It is on the Brünig line, owned by the Zentralbahn, that links Lucerne and Interlaken. Alpnachstad PB railway station, the lower terminus of the Pilatus Railway, a rack railway that ascends to the summit of Pilatus, is located across the street.

Alpnachstad station is one of two Zentralbahn stations to serve Alpnach, the other being Alpnach Dorf, which is on the Brünig line some 1.5 kilometres (0.93 mi) to the south, and nearer the centre of Alpnach.

== Services ==
The following services stop at Alpnachstad:

- Lucerne S-Bahn S5: half-hourly service between Lucerne and Giswil.

A nearby quay on Lake Lucerne is served by shipping services of the Schifffahrtsgesellschaft des Vierwaldstättersees (SGV), providing an alternative connection to Lucerne and other lakeside communities.

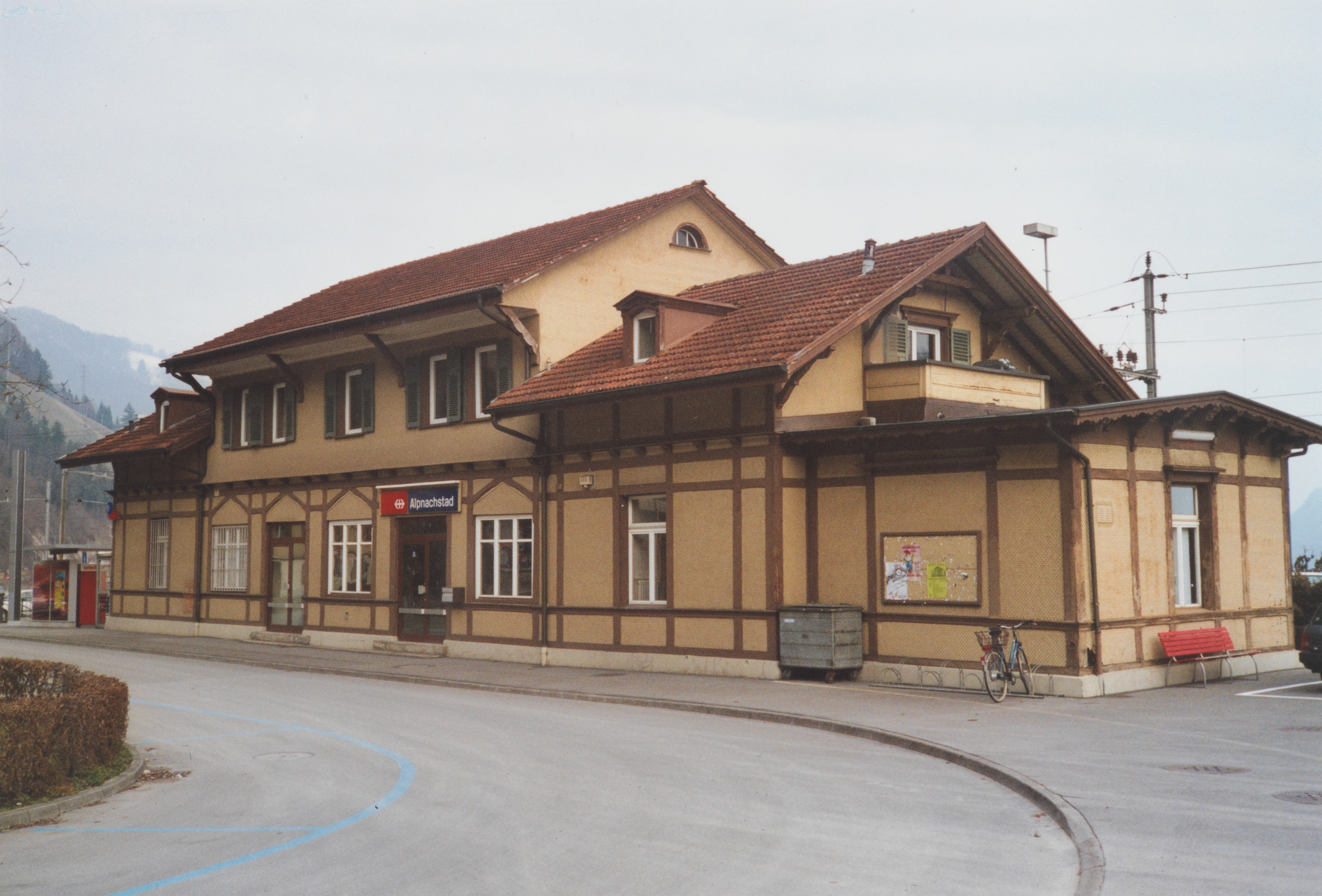
station from the street side (2004)

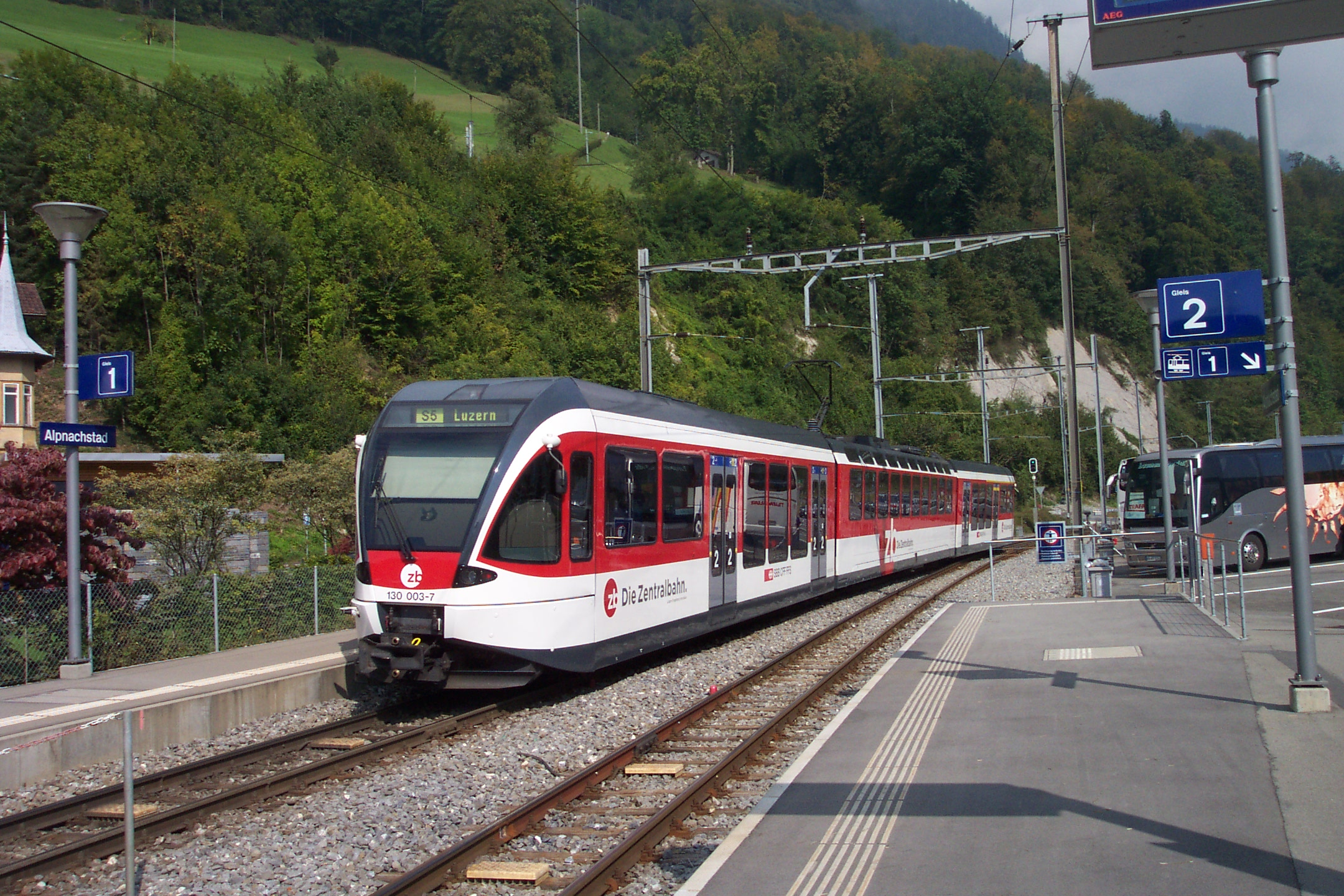
train departing to Lucerne (2011)

== See also ==
- Rail transport in Switzerland
