= Sarnen railway station =

Railway station in Switzerland

Sarnen
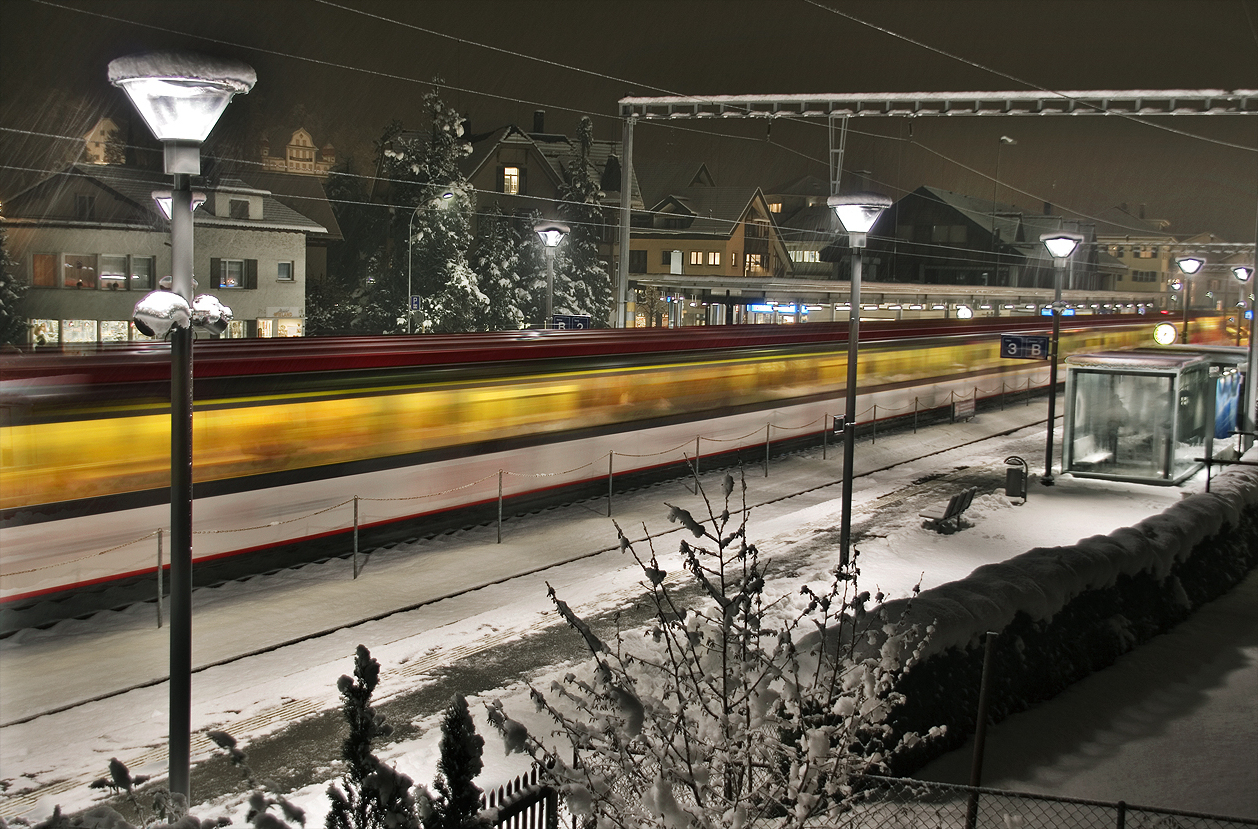
- A train passes through the station in 2008

General information
- Location: Bahnhofplatz; Sarnen; Switzerland
- Coordinates: 46°53′41″N 8°14′51″E
- Elevation: 473 m (1,552 ft)
- Owner: Zentralbahn
- Line: Brünig line
- Train operators: Zentralbahn

Services
Preceding station	Zentralbahn	Following station
Sachseln towards Interlaken Ost	Panorama Express Luzern-Interlaken Express	Lucerne Terminus
Preceding station	Lucerne S-Bahn	Following station
Sachseln towards Giswil	S5	Sarnen Nord towards Lucerne
Sachseln Terminus	S55	Alpnach Dorf towards Lucerne
Location
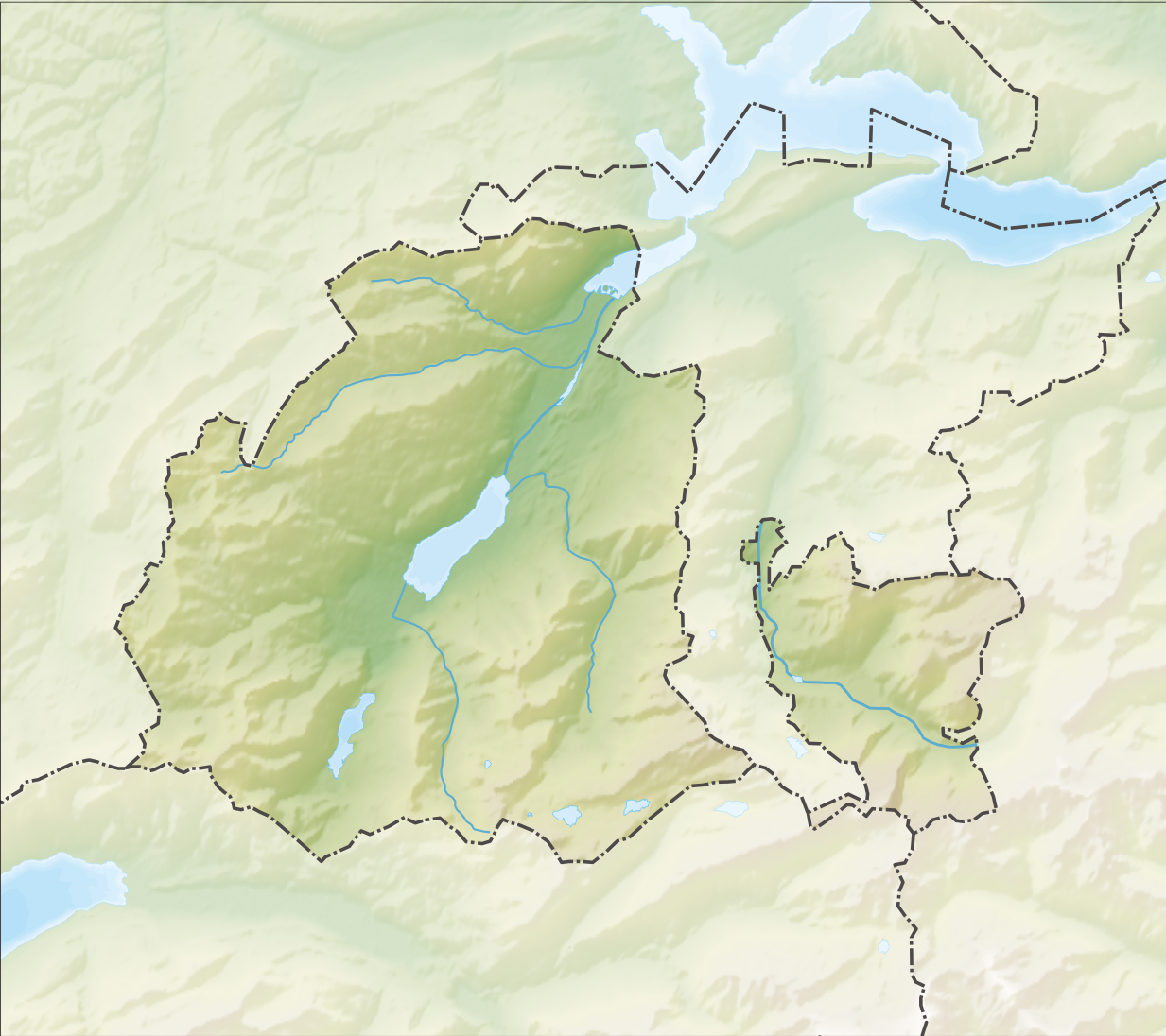
- Location within Switzerland Location within Canton of Obwalden

Sarnen railway station is a Swiss railway station on the Brünig line, owned by the Zentralbahn, that links Lucerne and Interlaken. The station is in the municipality of Sarnen in the canton of Obwalden.

== Services ==
The following services stop at Sarnen:

- Panorama Express Luzern-Interlaken Express: hourly service between Lucerne and Interlaken Ost.
- Lucerne S-Bahn:
  - S5: half-hourly service between Lucerne and Giswil.
  - S55: rush-hour service between Lucerne and Sachseln.
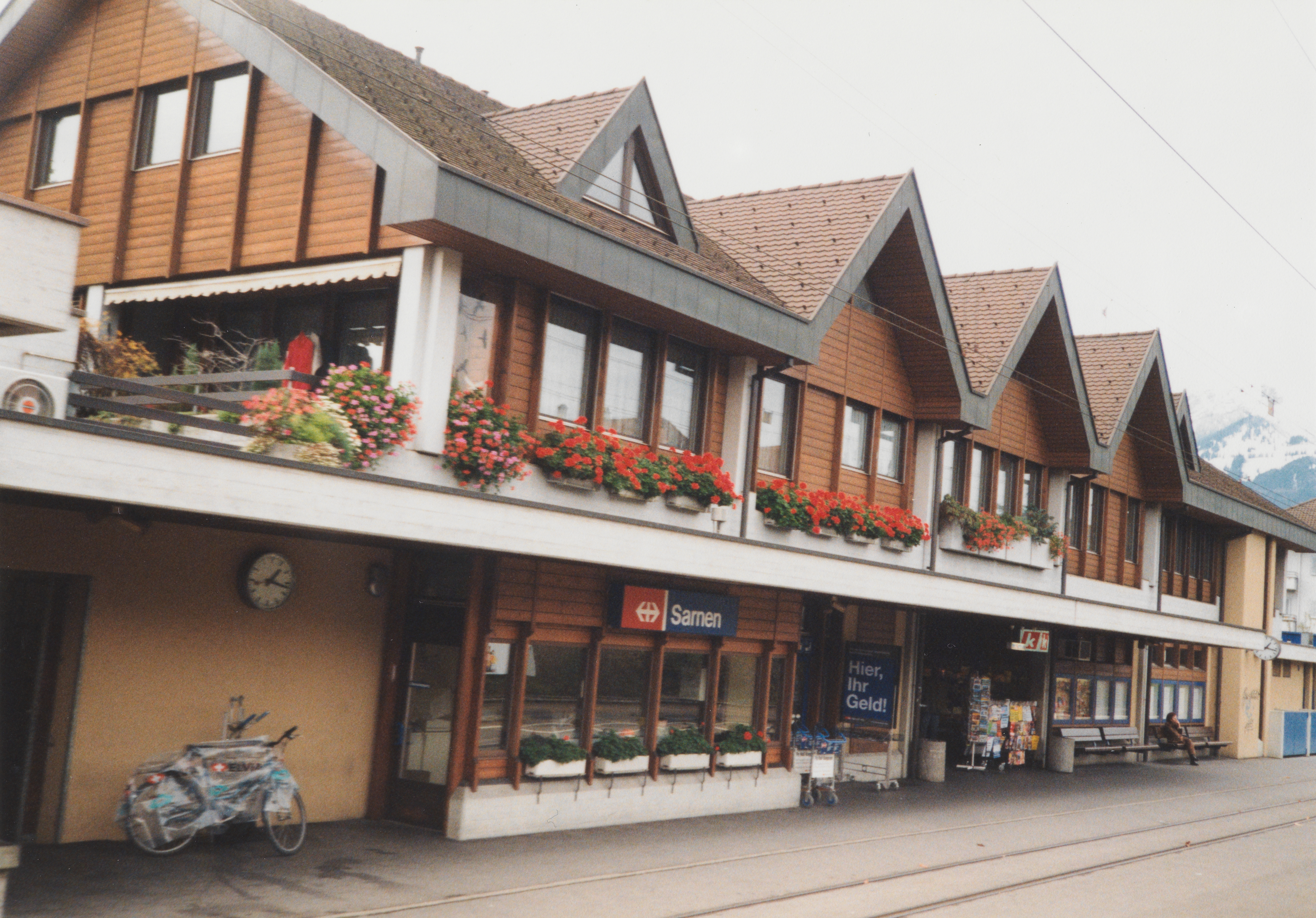
station building in 2012

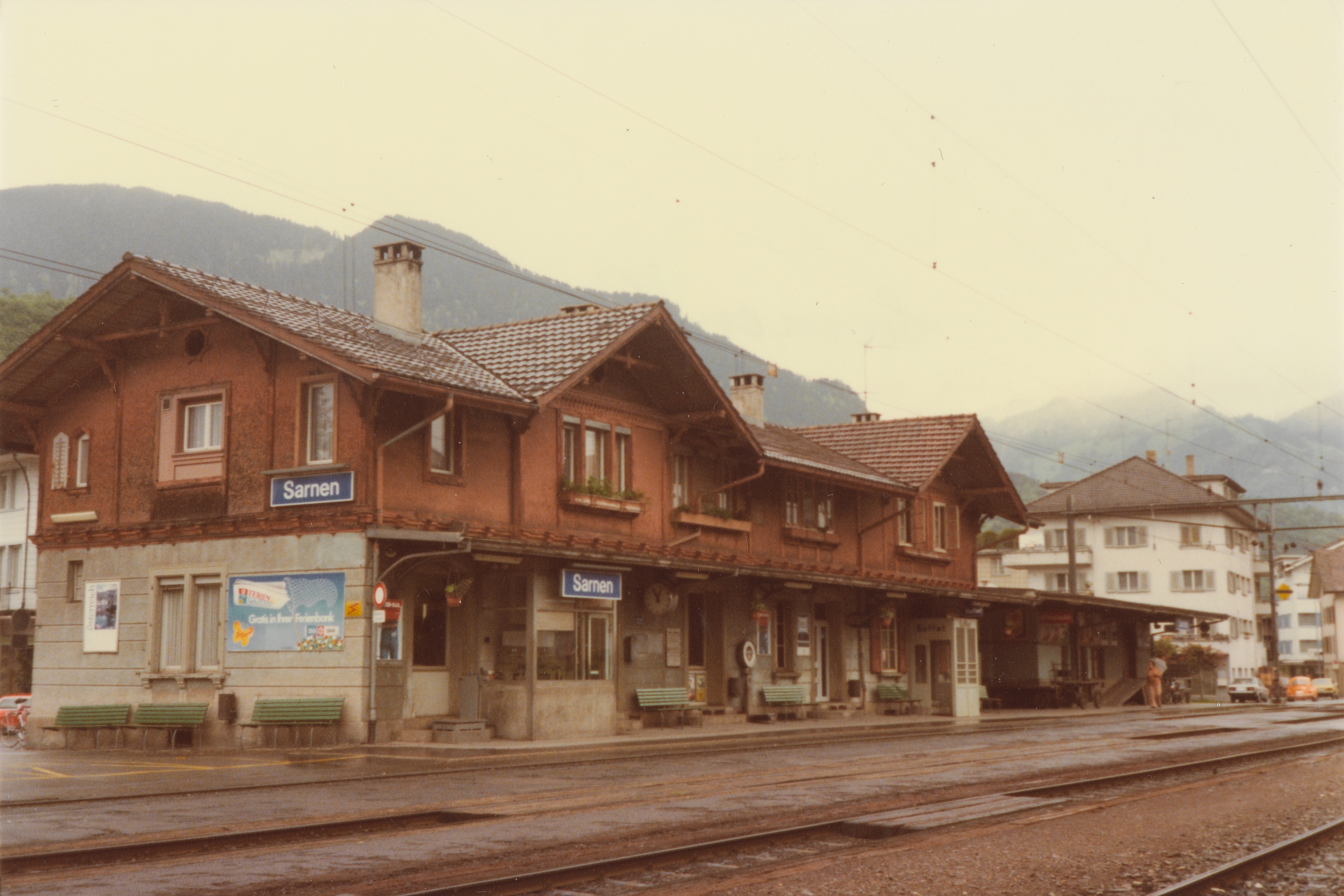
former station building in 1980, train side

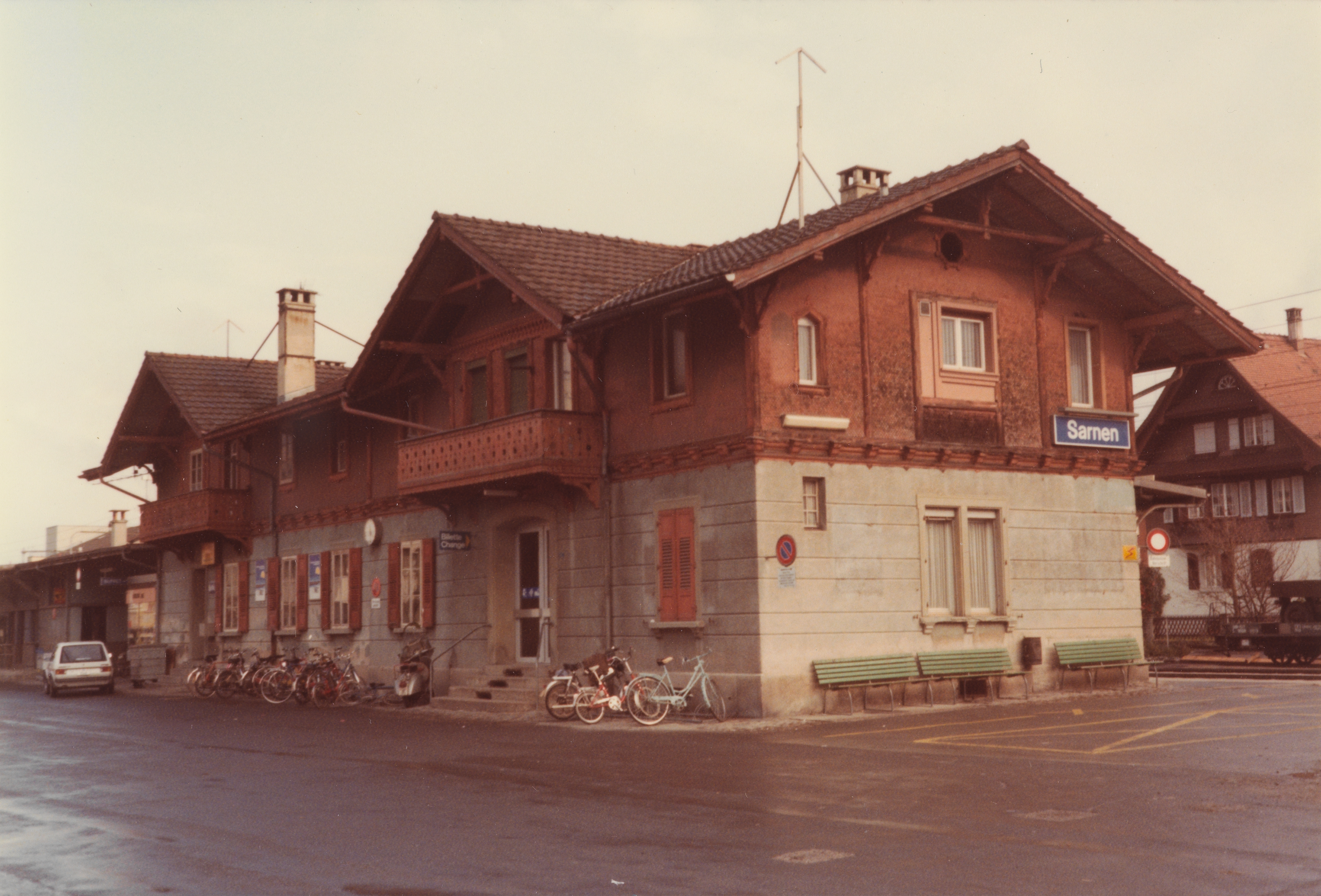
former station building 1981, street side
