= Nordbahnhof =

Nordbahnhof (North railway station) may refer to:

Austria

- Wien Praterstern railway station, formerly known as Wien Nordbahnhof (Vienna North railway station)

Germany

- Berlin Nordbahnhof
- Berlin Old Nordbahnhof
- Bochum-Nord station
- Braunschweig Nord station, Braunschweig
- Darmstadt Nord station
- Ingolstadt Nord station
- Strausberg Nord station
- Stuttgart Nord station

Switzerland

- Bern Bümpliz Nord railway station
- Bischofszell Nord railway station
- Grenchen Nord railway station
- Kehrsatz Nord railway station
- Sarnen Nord railway station

== See also ==
- Media related to Nordbahnhof at Wikimedia Commons
- North Station (disambiguation)
- Estación del Norte (disambiguation)
- Gare du Nord (disambiguation)
