= North Avenue =

North Avenue may refer to:

- North Avenue (Atlanta), an east-west thoroughfare in Atlanta on which Georgia Tech and the world headquarters for Coca-Cola are located
- North Avenue (Baltimore), a major street in Baltimore that most of is part of US Route 1
- North Avenue (Quezon City), one of the major roads in Quezon City, Metro Manila, Philippines
- North Avenue (Chicago)
- North Avenue station (disambiguation), train stations of the name
