= North Station (disambiguation) =

North Station is a train station in Boston.

North Station may also refer to:

- North Station (subway), Boston
- North Station (film), a 2002 Canadian film

== See also ==
- North Avenue station (disambiguation)
- Estación del Norte (disambiguation)
- Nordbahnhof (disambiguation)
- Gare du Nord (disambiguation)
- Estació del Nord (disambiguation)
- South Station (disambiguation)
- East Station (disambiguation)
- West station (disambiguation)
