= Alpnach =

- Municipality
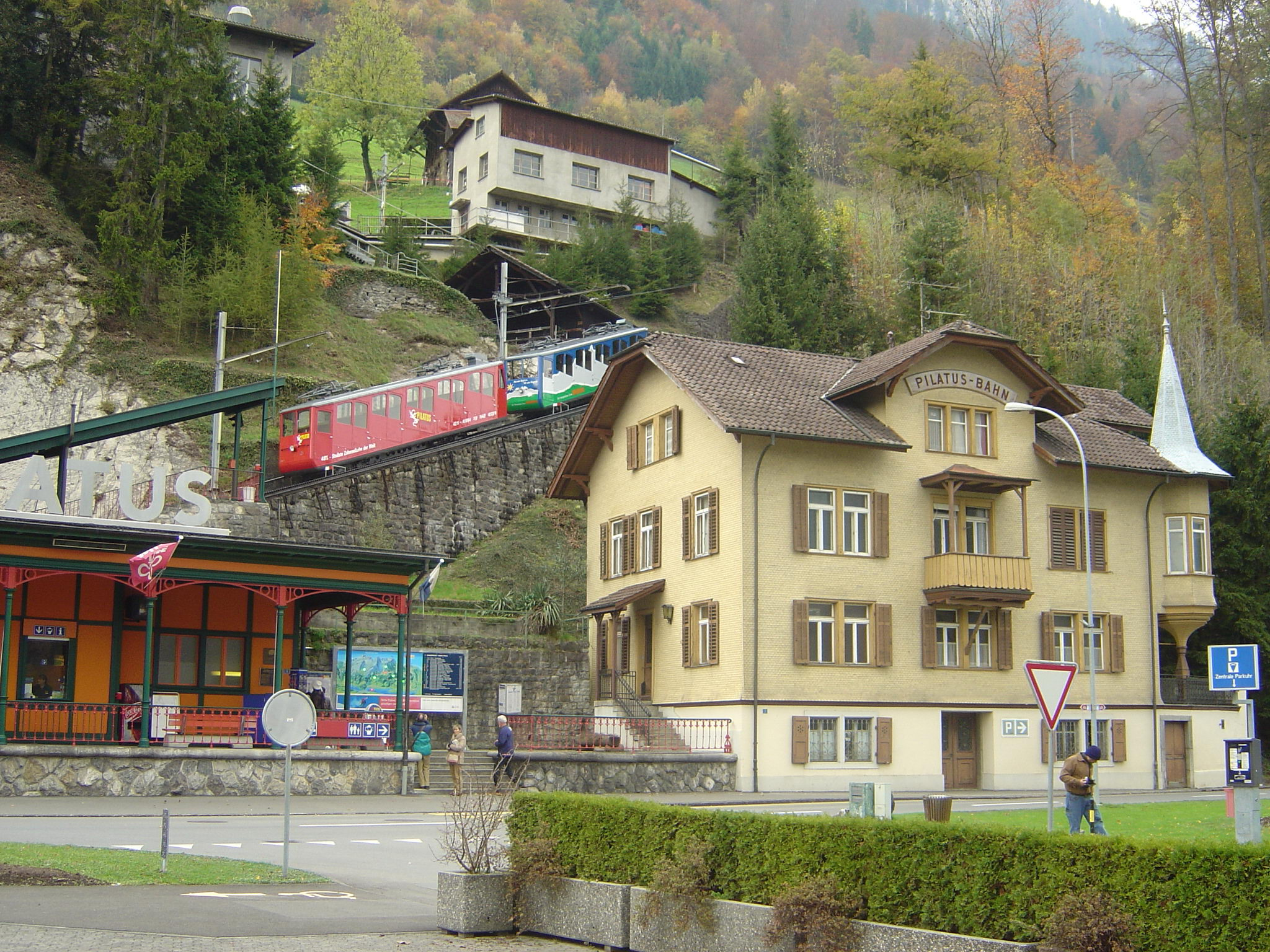

- Coat of arms
- Location of Alpnach
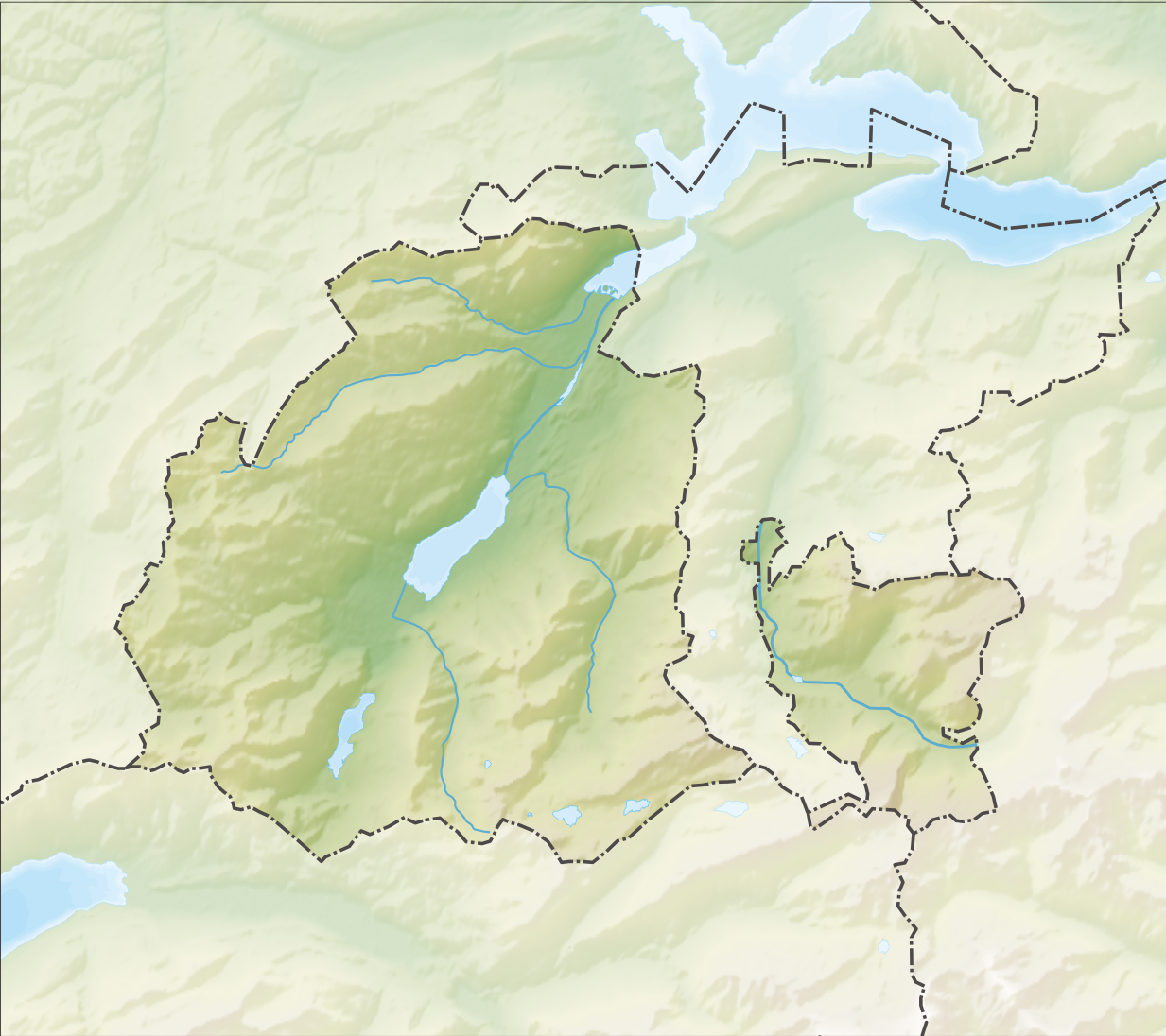
- Location within Switzerland Location within Canton of Obwalden
- Coordinates: 46°56′N 8°16′E
- Country: Switzerland
- Canton: Obwalden
- District: n.a.

Area
  - Total: 56.98 km^{2} (22.00 sq mi)
- Elevation: 464 m (1,522 ft)

Population (December 2012)
  - Total: 5,736
  - Density: 100.7/km^{2} (260.7/sq mi)
- Time zone: UTC+01:00 (CET)
  - Summer (DST): UTC+02:00 (CEST)
- Postal code: 6055
- SFOS number: 1401
- ISO 3166 code: CH-OW
- Surrounded by: Ennetmoos (NW), Entlebuch (LU), Hergiswil (NW), Kerns, Sarnen, Schwarzenberg (LU), Stansstad (NW)
- Website: www.alpnach.ch

Alpnach is a village in the canton of Obwalden in Switzerland. It comprises the villages of Alpnach Dorf, Alpnachstad and Schoried.

== History ==
Alpnach is first mentioned about 870 as Alpenacho.

== Geography ==
Aerial view from 250 m by Walter Mittelholzer (1931)

Alpnach has an area, as of 2006, of 53.8 square kilometers (20.8 sq mi). Of this area, 32.1% is used for agricultural purposes, while 54.1% is forested. Of the rest of the land, 5% is settled (buildings or roads) and the remainder (8.9%) is non-productive (rivers, glaciers or mountains).

The municipality is located on the heights above two streams, the Large and Small Schliere. During the mid-19th century the village became a linear village. While in the 20th century, it expanded into a Haufendorf (an irregular, unplanned and quite closely packed village, built around a central square). It consists of the villages of Alpnach Dorf, Alpnachstad and Schoried.

== Demographics ==
Alpnach has a population (as of 31 December 2020) of 6,109. As of 2007, 13.2% of the population was made up of foreign nationals. Over the last 10 years the population has grown at a rate of 11.1%. Most of the population (as of 2000) speaks German (89.7%), with Albanian being second most common ( 2.3%) and Portuguese being third ( 1.8%). As of 2000 the gender distribution of the population was 50.8% male and 49.2% female. As of 2000 there are 1,828 households in Alpnach.

In the 2007 federal election the most popular party was the CVP which received 34.1% of the vote. The next three most popular parties were the SVP (33.6%), the Other (23.2%) and the SPS (9%).

In Alpnach about 67.2% of the population (between age 25 and 64) have completed either non-mandatory upper secondary education or additional higher education (either university or a Fachhochschule).

Alpnach has an unemployment rate of 1.55%. As of 2005, there were 228 people employed in the primary economic sector and about 91 businesses involved in this sector. 839 people are employed in the secondary sector and there are 81 businesses in this sector. 952 people are employed in the tertiary sector, with 144 businesses in this sector.

The historical population is given in the following table:

year	population
1799	1,157
1850	1,622
1900	1,779
1950	3,022
2000	4,932

== Transport ==
Alpnach is served by Alpnach Dorf station and Alpnachstad station on the Brünig line, an inter-regional narrow-gauge railway from Interlaken to Lucerne. The half-hourly Lucerne S-Bahn S5 service between Giswil and Lucerne stops at both stations, whilst the hourly InterRegio train between Interlaken and Lucerne normally stops only at Alpnach Dorf station. Alpnachstad is also served by Lake Lucerne shipping services of the Schifffahrtsgesellschaft des Vierwaldstättersees (SGV), providing an alternative connection to Lucerne and other lakeside communities. Alpnachstad PB railway station, located across the street from Alpnachstad station, is the terminus of the Pilatus Railway to the summit of Mount Pilatus.

Alpnach is also home to the Alpnach Air Base of the Swiss Air Force.

== Sights ==
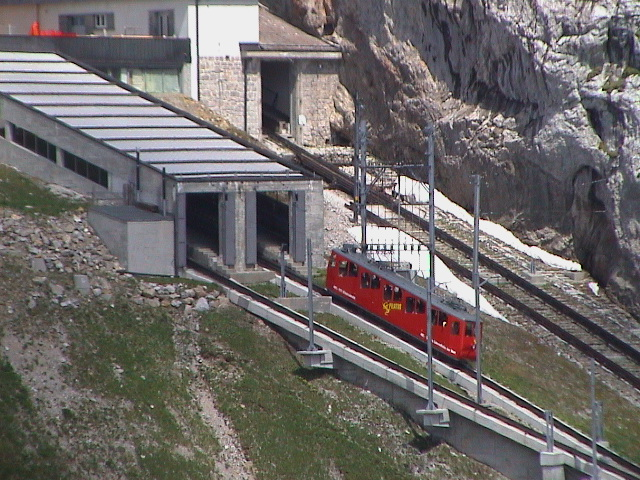
Pilatusbahn, the world's steepest rack railway

The main sights of Alpnach include the world's steepest rack railway to the mountain Pilatus, a Roman mansion, and a hand-operated print shop.
