= Sarnen Nord railway station =

Swiss railway station

Sarnen Nord
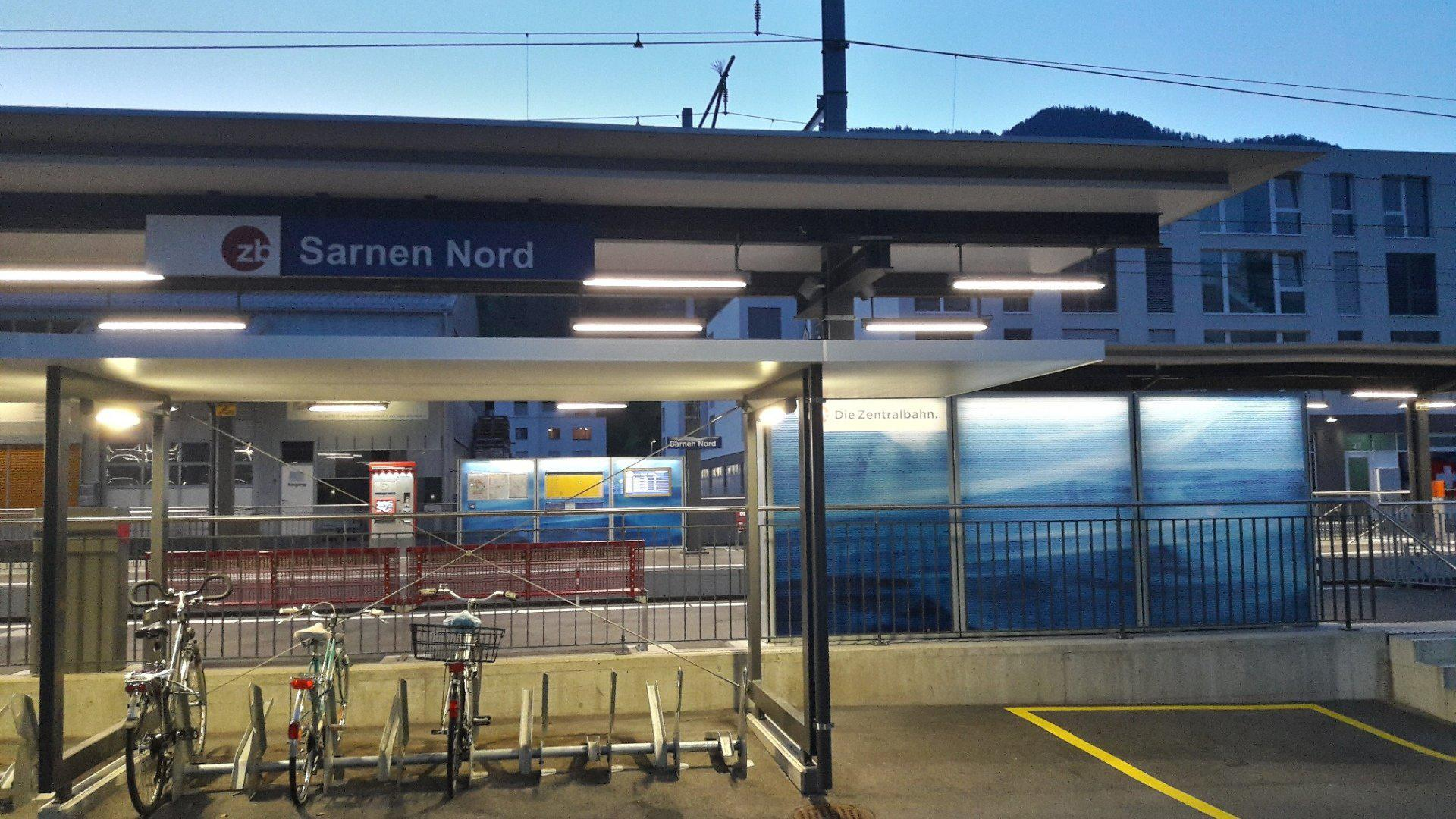
- The station platforms in 2018

General information
- Location: Sarnen; Switzerland
- Coordinates: 46°54′00″N 8°14′56″E
- Owner: Zentralbahn
- Line: Brünig line
- Train operators: Zentralbahn

History
- Opened: 11 December 2016

Services
Preceding station	Lucerne S-Bahn	Following station
Sarnen towards Giswil	S5	Alpnach Dorf towards Lucerne
Location
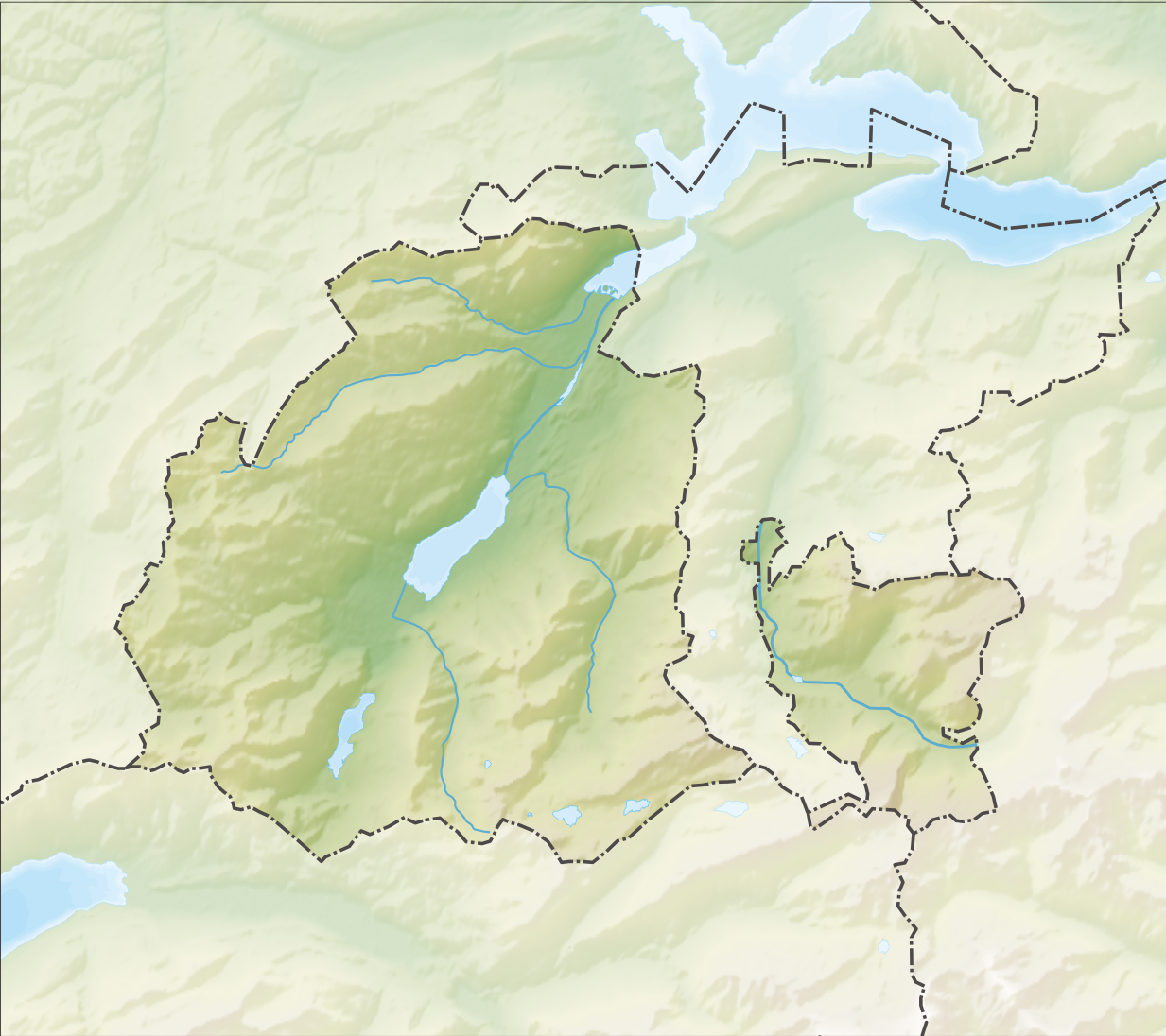
- Location within Switzerland Location within Canton of Obwalden

Sarnen Nord railway station (German: Bahnhof Sarnen Nord) is a railway station in the municipality of Sarnen, in the Swiss canton of Obwalden. It is an intermediate stop on the 1,000 mm (3 ft 3 3/8 in) gauge Brünig line of the Zentralbahn. The station opened with the timetable change on 11 December 2016, following the completion of a double-tracking project between Sarnen and Kägiswil.

== Services ==
The following services stop at Sarnen Nord:

- Lucerne S-Bahn S5: half-hourly service between Lucerne and Giswil.
