= Ewil Maxon railway station =

Railway station in Switzerland

Ewil Maxon
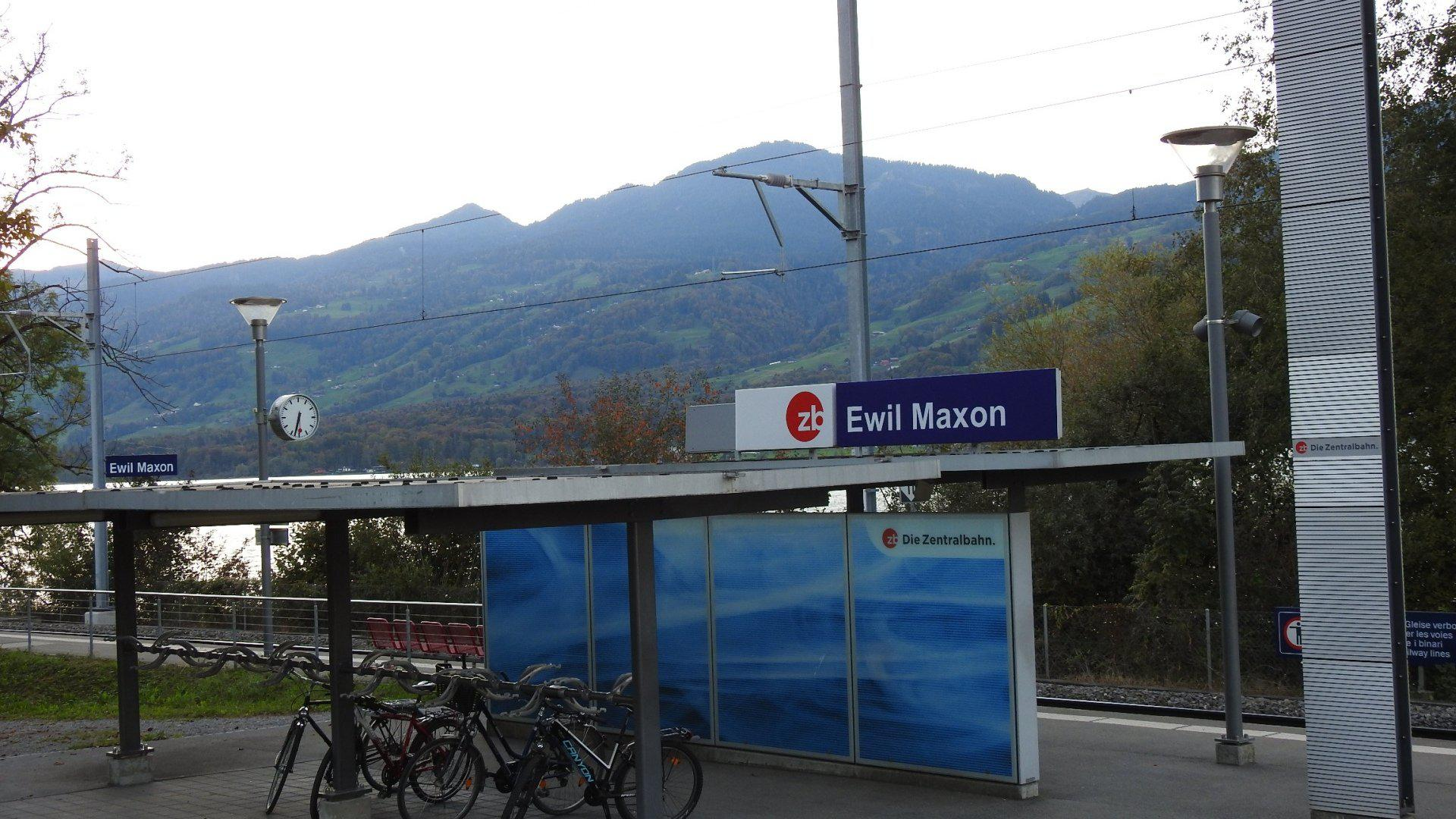
- The station platform in 2018

General information
- Location: Sachseln; Switzerland
- Coordinates: 46°51′39″N 8°13′07″E
- Owner: Zentralbahn
- Line: Brünig line
- Train operators: Zentralbahn

Services
Preceding station	Lucerne S-Bahn	Following station
Giswil Terminus	S5	Sachseln towards Lucerne
Location
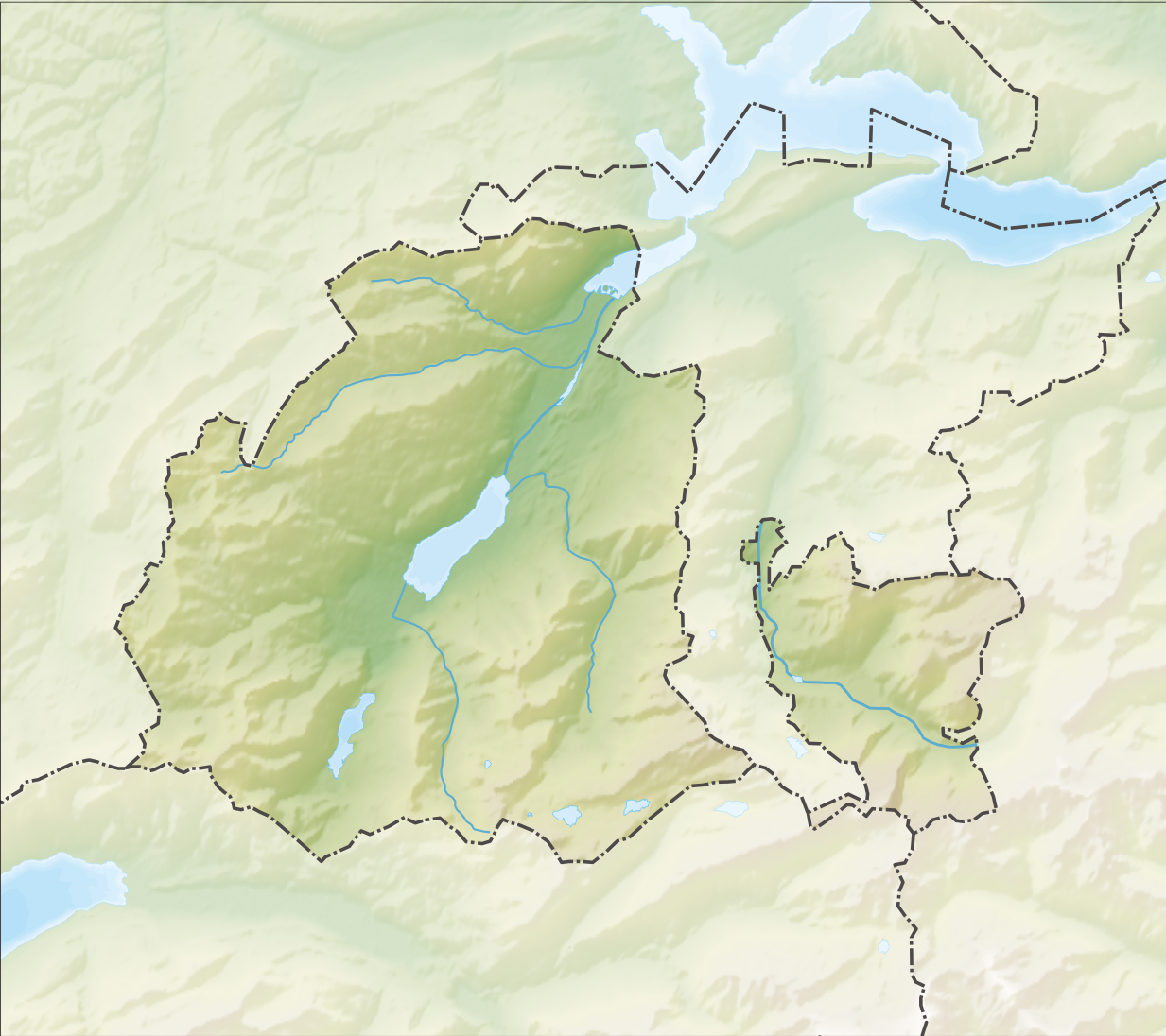
- Location within Switzerland Location within Canton of Obwalden

Ewil Maxon railway station is a Swiss railway station on the Brünig line, owned by the Zentralbahn, that links Lucerne and Interlaken. The station is in the municipality of Sachseln in the canton of Obwalden. It takes its name from the nearby hamlet of Ewil, together with the precision electric motor manufacturer Maxon Motor, whose plant adjoins the station.

== Services ==
The following services stop at Ewil Maxon:

- Lucerne S-Bahn S5: half-hourly service between Lucerne and Giswil.
