= Alpnachstad PB railway station =

Railway station in Alpnachstad, Switzerland

Alpnachstad PB
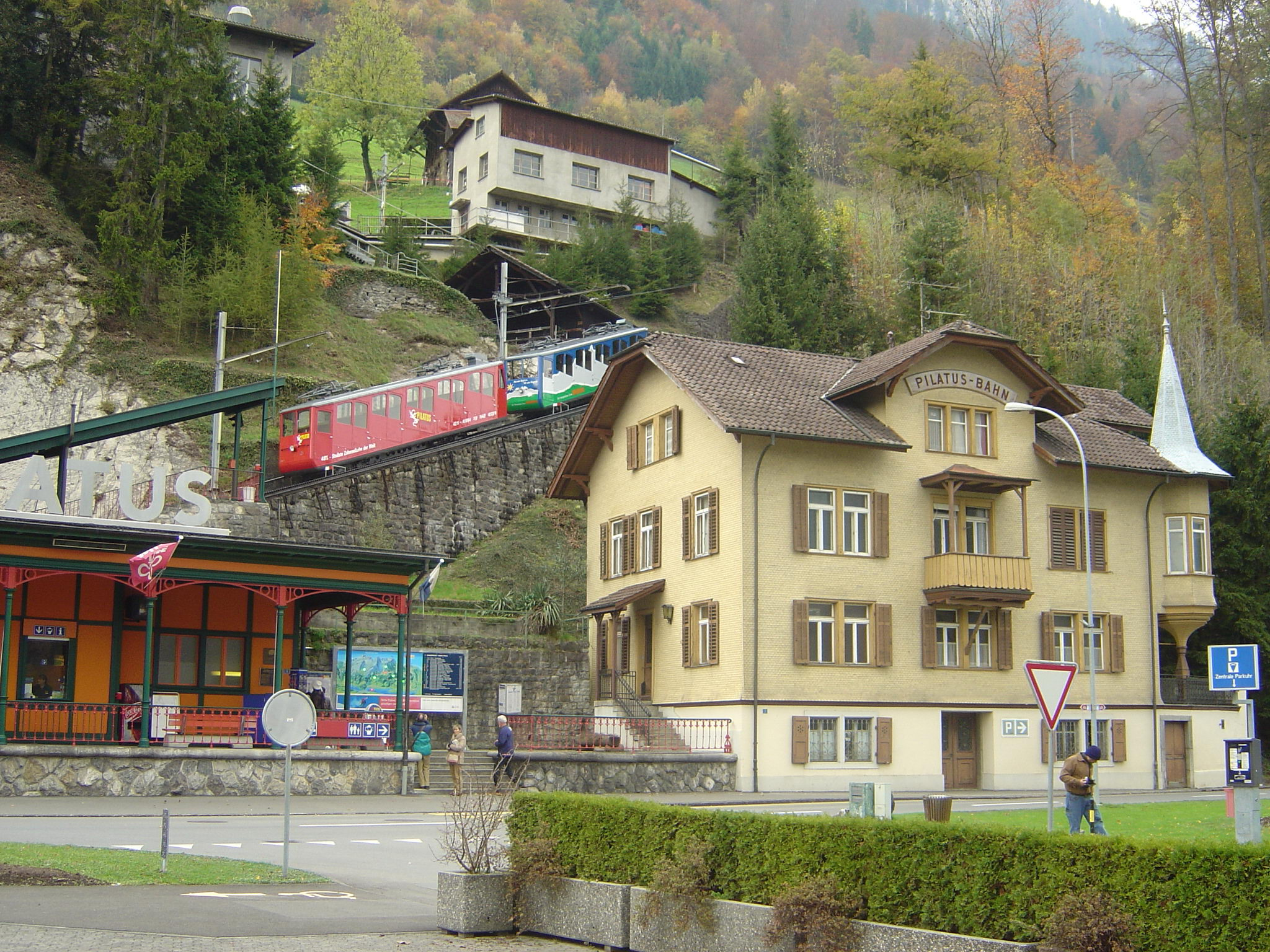
- The station building in 2004

General information
- Location: Alpnachstad; Switzerland
- Coordinates: 46°57′18″N 8°16′37″E
- Elevation: 440 m (1,440 ft)
- Owner: Pilatus-Bahnen AG
- Line: Pilatus line
- Train operators: Pilatus-Bahnen AG

Services
Preceding station	Pilatus-Bahnen AG	Following station
Terminus	Pilatus line	Aemsigen towards Pilatus Kulm
Location
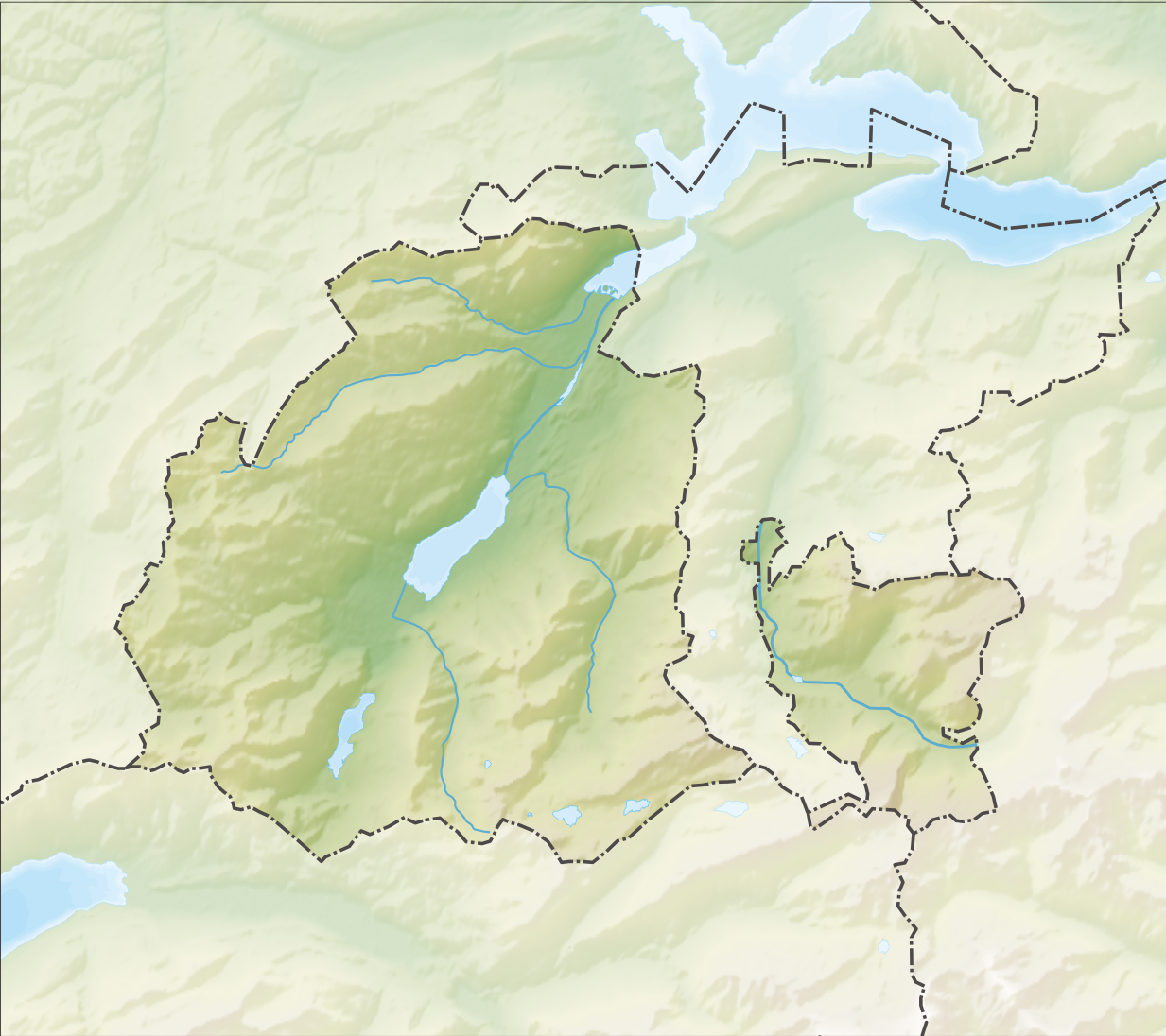
- Location within Switzerland Location within Canton of Obwalden

Alpnachstad PB railway station (German: Bahnhof Alpnachstad PB) is a railway station in the municipality of Alpnach, in the Swiss canton of Obwalden. It is the base station of the Pilatus Railway rack railway that ascends near the summit of Pilatus. The station is located across the street from the Alpnachstad station of Zentralbahn on the Brünig line.

== Services ==
The following services stop at Alpnachstad PB:

- From May–October: service every forty minutes to Pilatus Kulm.
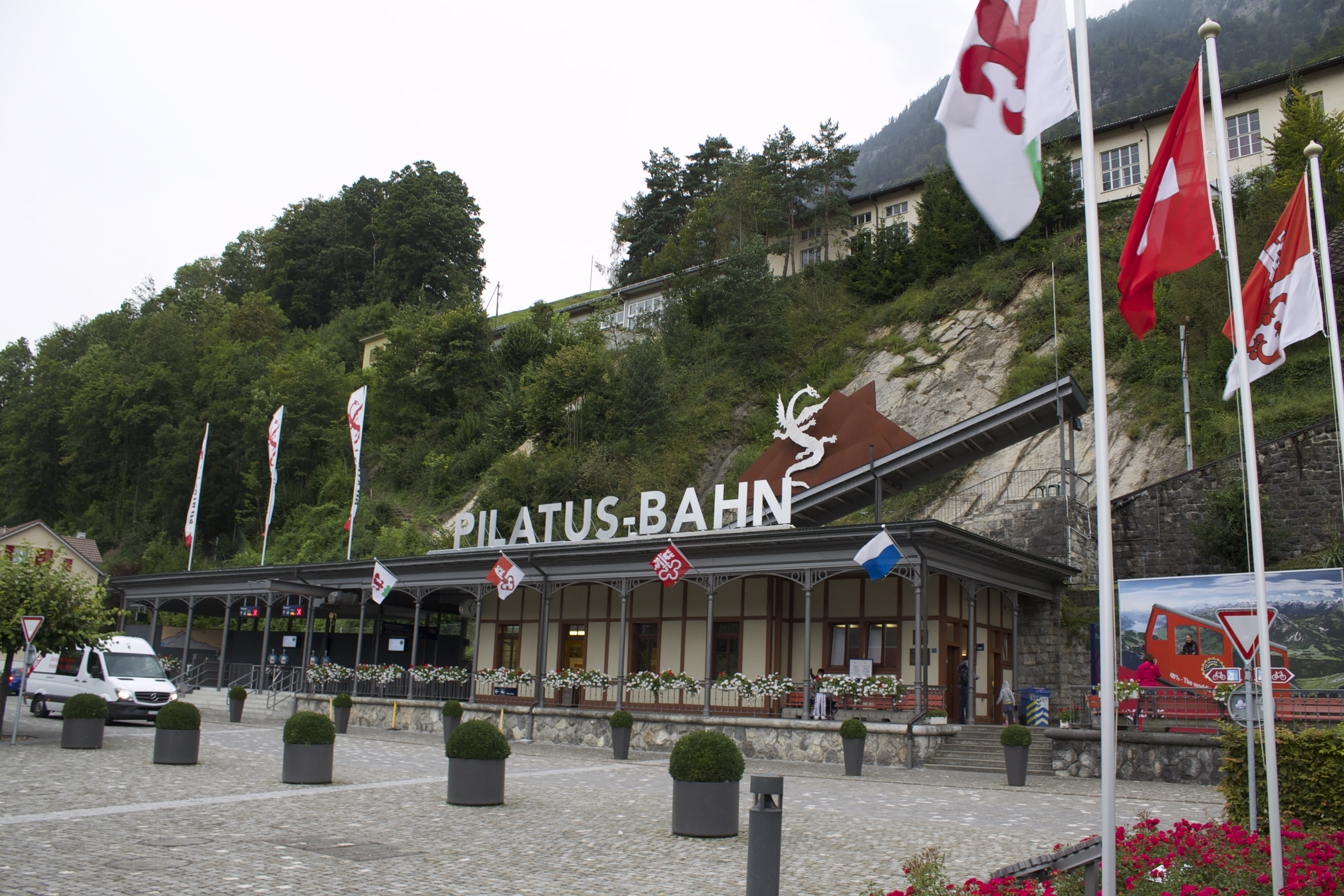
Station exterior (2014)
