= Bochum-Nord station =

Railway station in Bochum, Germany

Bochum Nord
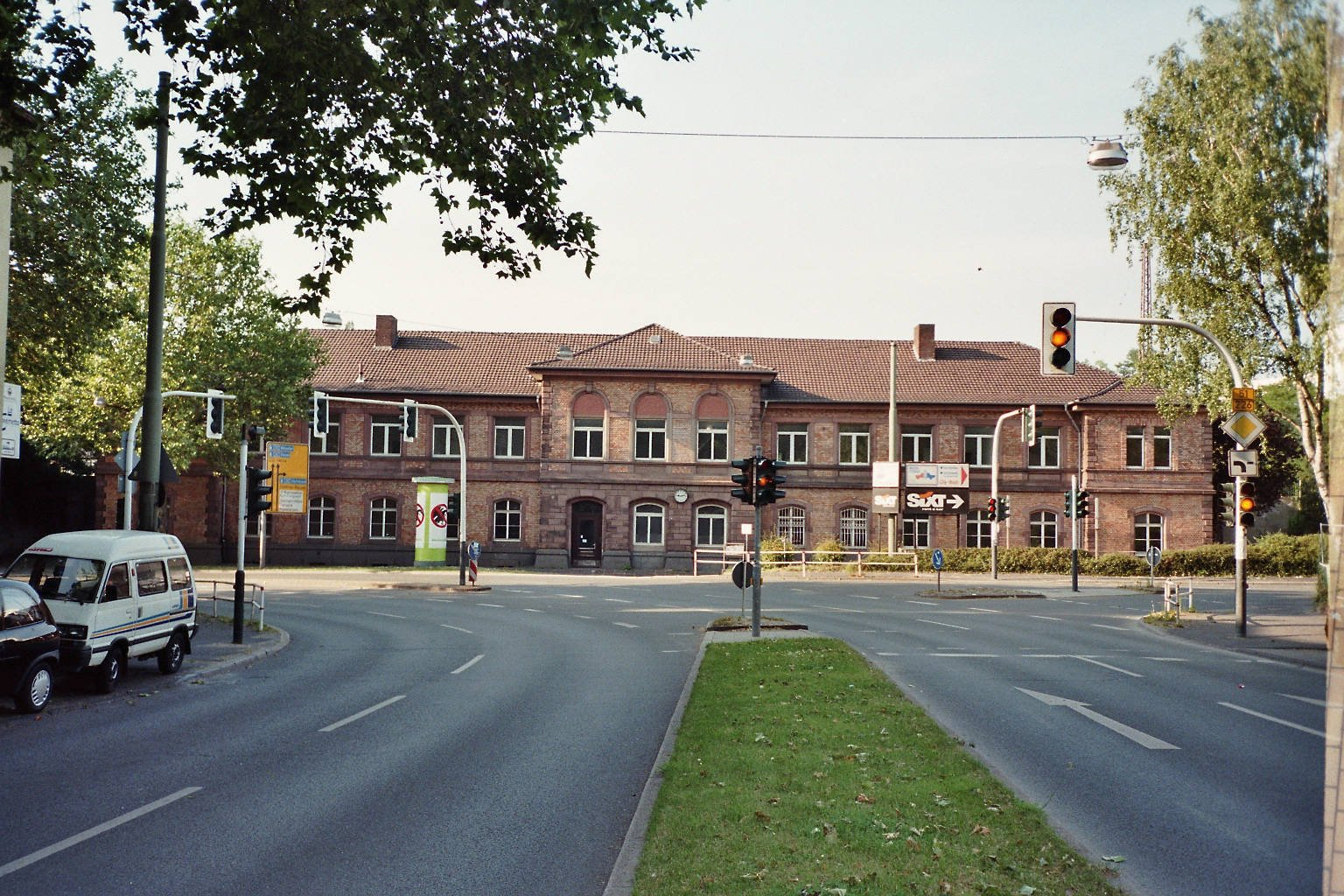

General information
- Location: Bochum, North Rhine-Westphalia; Germany
- Coordinates: 51°28′58″N 7°13′31″E
- System: Closed station
- Line: Osterath–Dortmund Süd railway

Other information
- Station code: n/a
- DS100 code: EBNO

History
- Opened: 15 October 1874
Location
- Location within North Rhine-Westphalia Location within Germany Location within Europe

Bochum Nord station was a station on the Ostring (east ring) in the city of Bochum in the German state of North Rhine-Westphalia. It was built by the Rhenish Railway Company between 1871 and 1874 and opened on 15 October 1874. The station, which was originally called Bochum Rheinisch ("Rhenish") station, for a long time served passenger and freight traffic on the Osterath–Dortmund Süd railway.

East of the station building, an 11-road roundhouse was built in the freight yard, which is still preserved in parts. In 1883, the station was connected by the Bochum-Weitmar–Bochum-Nord branch of the Essen-Überruhr–Bochum-Langendreer railway to the Ruhr Valley Railway in Bochum Dahlhausen.

Before the construction of the connecting curve in 1979 from the current Bochum Hauptbahnhof (main station) to the Bochum–Gelsenkirchen railway, the station was served by passenger trains in the route to Wanne-Eickel and Herne.

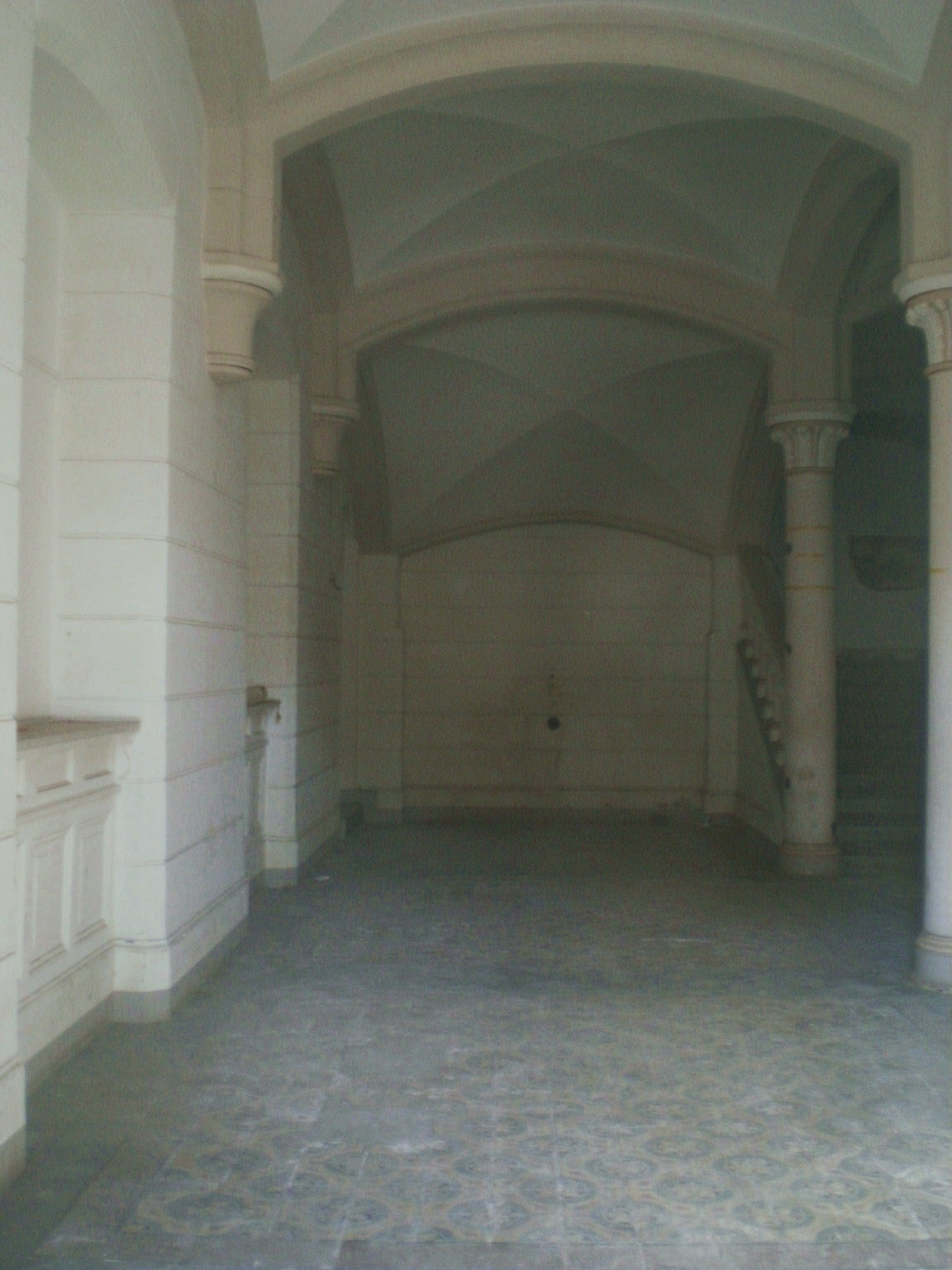
Entrance hall, still intact

During the period of Nazi Germany, the deportation of Jews to concentration camps in Bochum was usually held at Bochum Nord station.

The locomotive depot was abandoned in 1959 and passenger services were abandoned in 1979. The second floor of the station building was closed after the Second World War for rehabilitation. Since 1979, the station building has only been used by the railway administration. The Moritz Fiege private brewery has acquired the station building so that it can be used as a restaurant and for administration.

The freight yard is also the location of the main customs office of the Federal Government in the city of Bochum.
