= Sachseln railway station =

Railway station in Switzerland

Sachseln
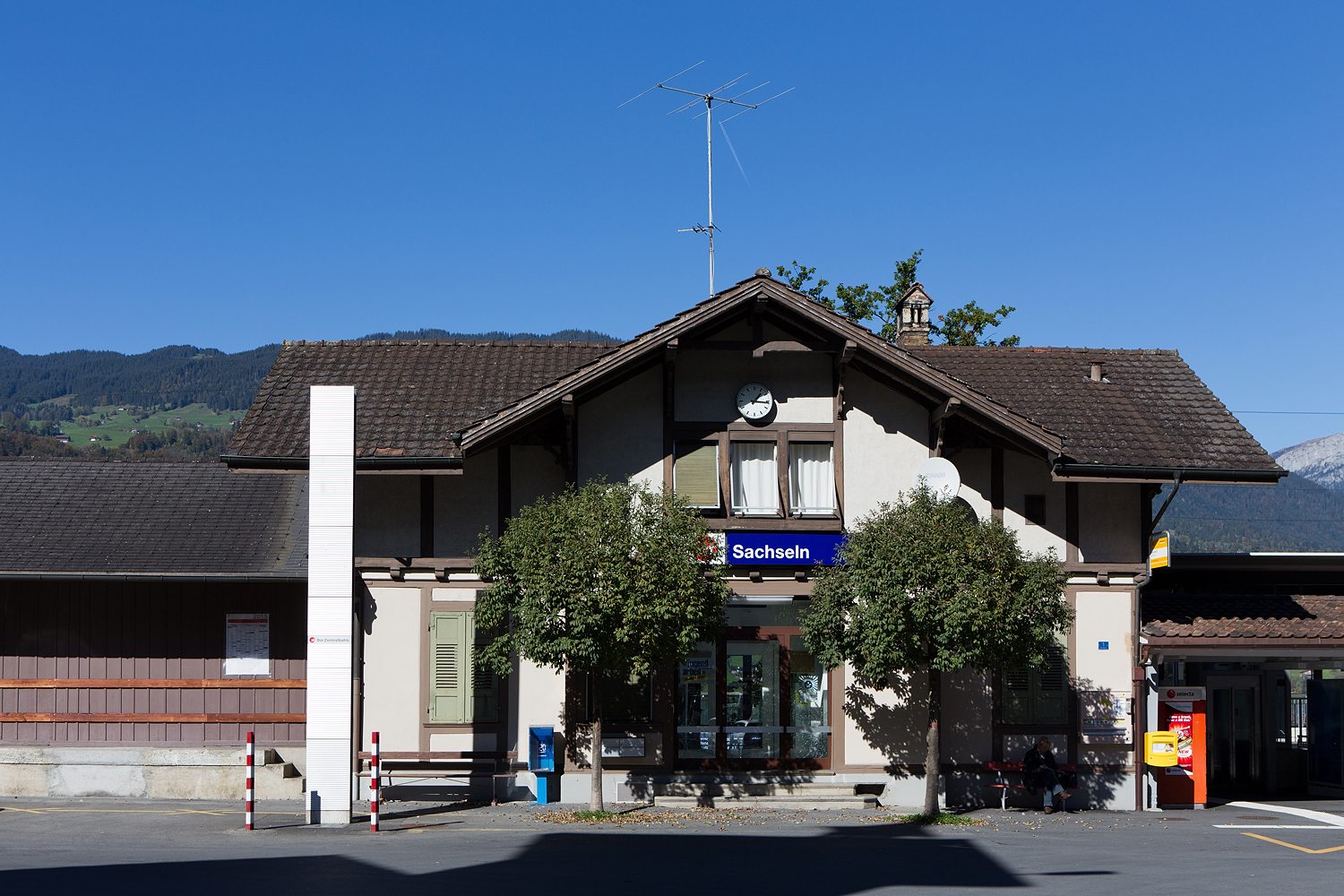
- The station building in 2014, view from station square

General information
- Location: Bahnhofstrasse; Sachseln; Switzerland
- Coordinates: 46°52′15″N 8°14′18″E
- Elevation: 471 m (1,545 ft)
- Owner: Zentralbahn
- Line: Brünig line
- Train operators: Zentralbahn

Services
Preceding station	Zentralbahn	Following station
Giswil towards Interlaken Ost	Panorama Express Luzern-Interlaken Express	Sarnen towards Lucerne
Preceding station	Lucerne S-Bahn	Following station
Ewil Maxon towards Giswil	S5	Sarnen towards Lucerne
Terminus	S55	Sarnen towards Lucerne
Location
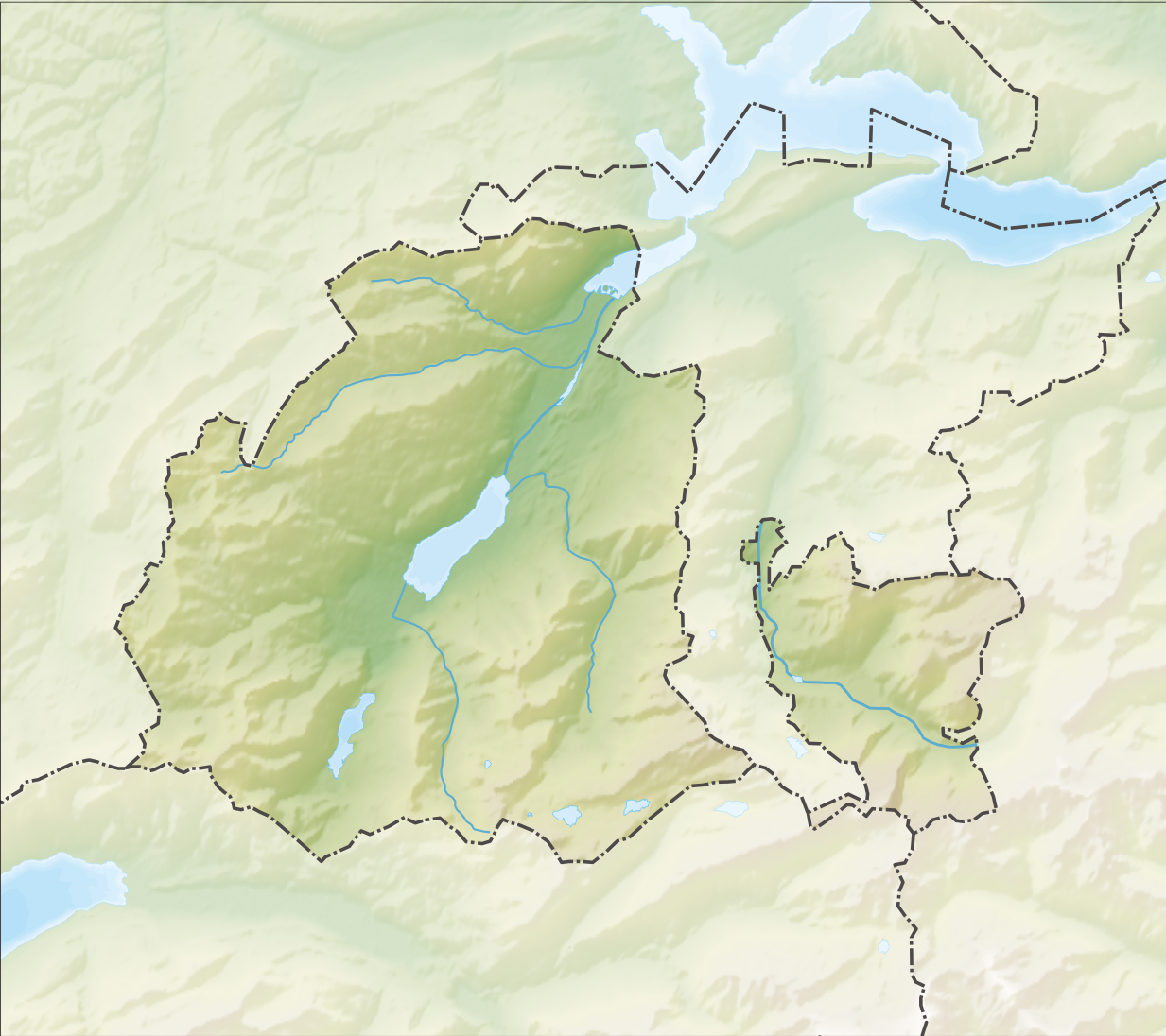
- Location within Switzerland Location within Canton of Obwalden

Sachseln railway station is a Swiss railway station on the Brünig line, owned by the Zentralbahn, that links Lucerne and Interlaken. The station is in the municipality of Sachseln in the canton of Obwalden.

== Services ==
The following services stop at Sachseln:

- Panorama Express Luzern-Interlaken Express: hourly service between Lucerne and Interlaken Ost.
- Lucerne S-Bahn:
  - S5: half-hourly service between Lucerne and Giswil.
  - S55: rush-hour service to Lucerne.
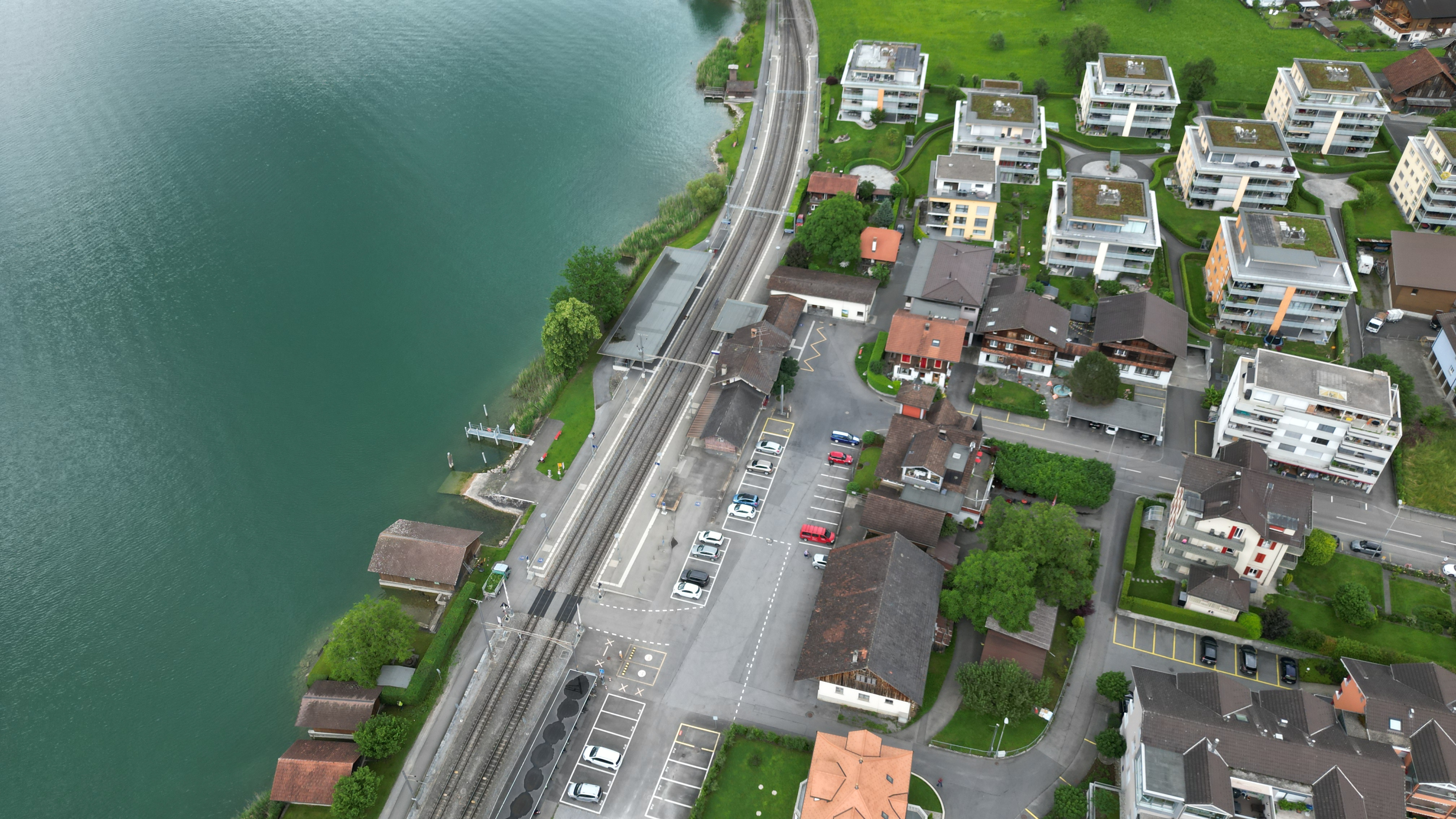
station from above (2022)

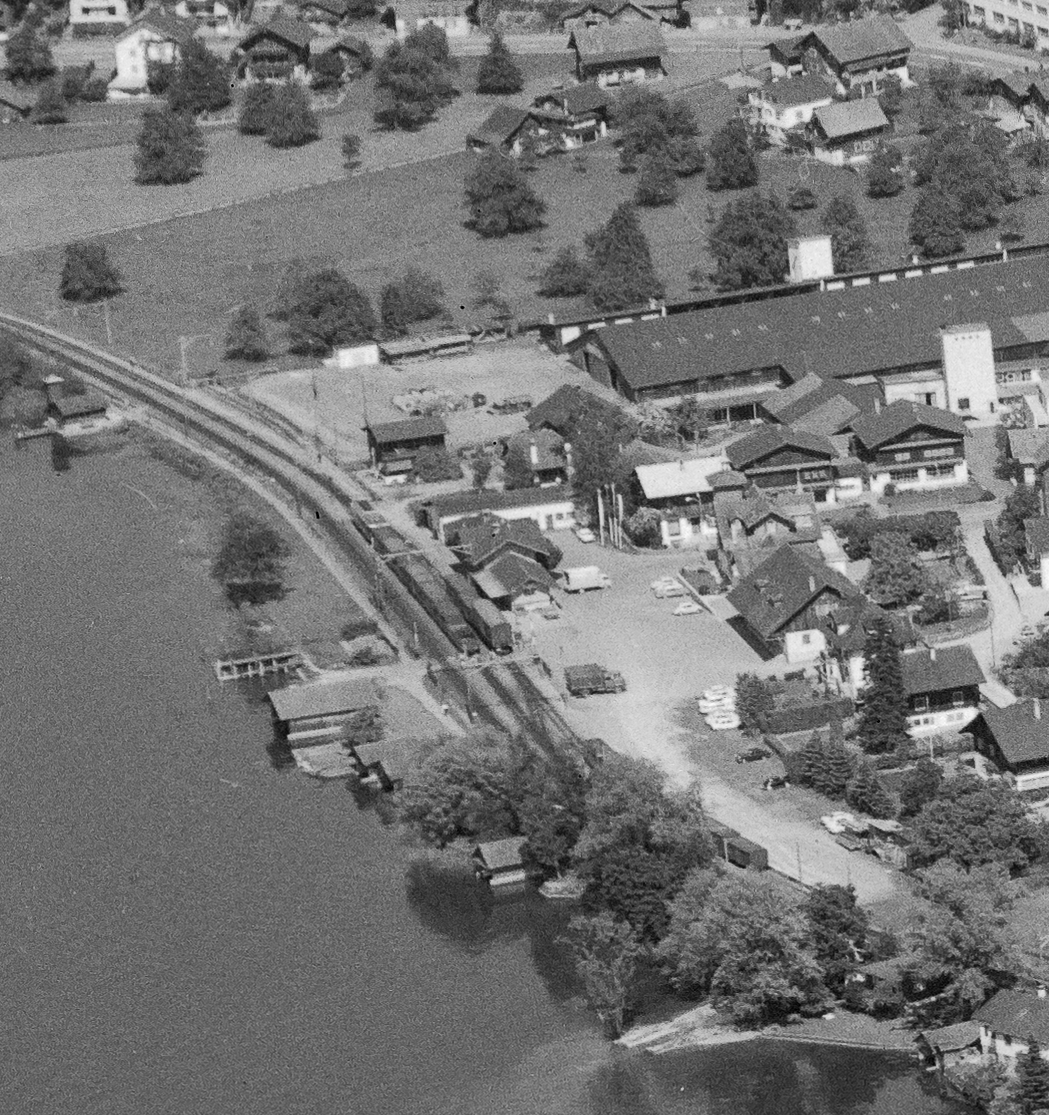
station from above (1967)

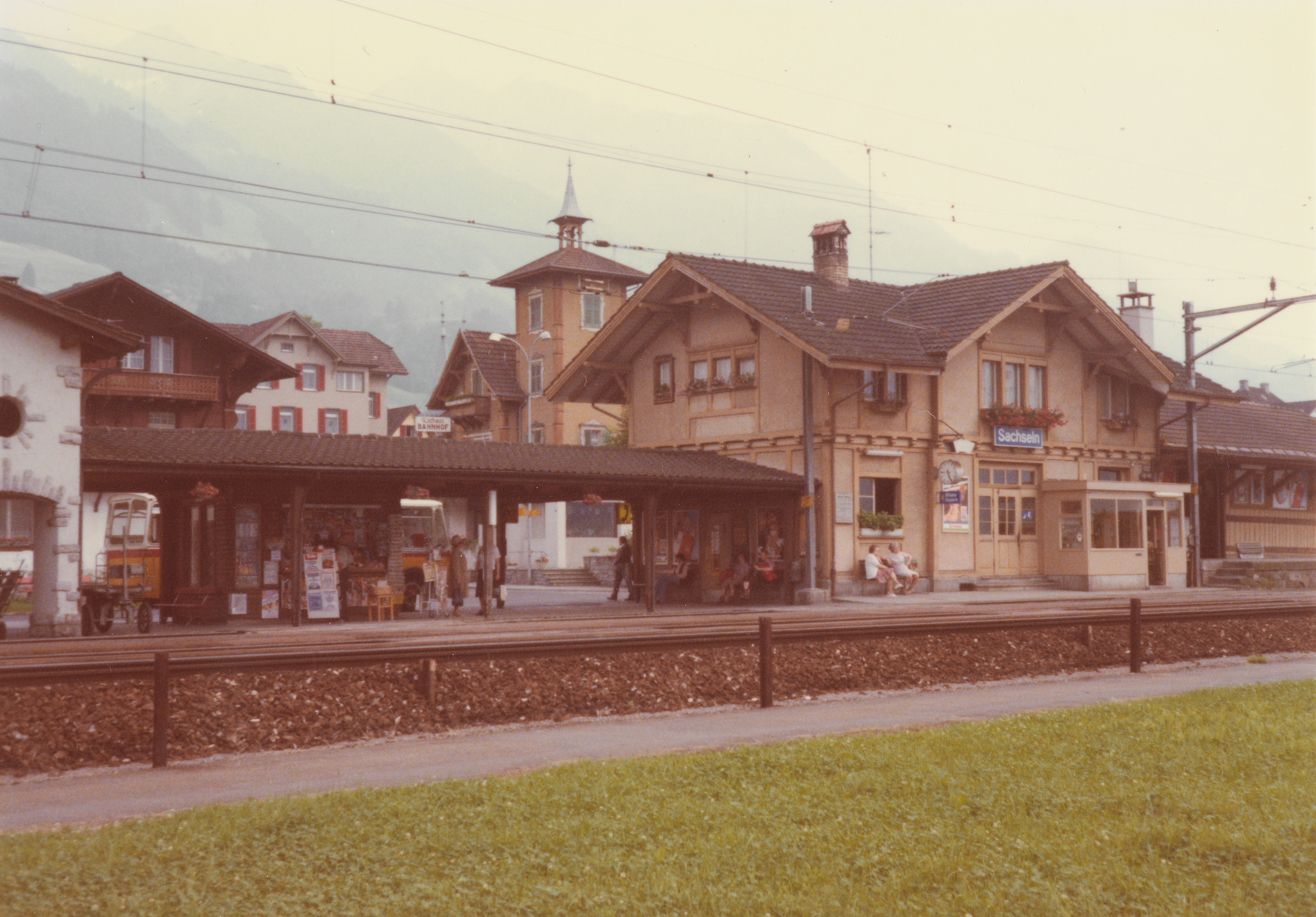
train side (1979)
