= North Avenue station =

North Avenue station may refer to:

- North Avenue station (Light RailLink), a train station in Baltimore, Maryland, US
- Penn-North station, a subway station in Baltimore, Maryland, US, which was referred to as North Avenue station during its planning and construction
- North Avenue station (MARTA), an underground subway station in Atlanta, Georgia
- North Avenue station (MRT), a train station of the MRT Line 3 in Quezon City, Philippines

== See also ==
- North Station (disambiguation)
- North Triangle Common Station, Quezon City, Philippines
