= Estación del Norte =

Estación del Norte may refer to:

- Estación del Norte (Barcelona)
- Estación del Norte (Burgos), Burgos
- Príncipe Pío (Madrid Metro) (Estación del Norte)
- Oviedo railway station (Estación del Norte)
- San Sebastián railway station (Estación del Norte)
- Estació del Nord (Valencia)
- Estación del Norte (Zaragoza)

== See also ==
- Media related to Estación del Norte at Wikimedia Commons
- North Station (disambiguation)
- Nordbahnhof (disambiguation)
- Gare du Nord (disambiguation)
