= Gare du Nord (disambiguation) =

Gare du Nord (lit. 'North Station') is a railway station terminus in Paris, and the busiest railway station in Europe.

It may also refer to:

== Transport ==
=== Belgium ===
- Gare du Nord, local name for Gare de Bruxelles-Nord, railway station in Brussels, Belgium
  - a Brussels Metro stop of the same name at the station

=== France ===
- Gare du Nord, a Paris Metro station that connects to Gare du Nord railway station
- Gare du Nord, local name for Gare d'Amiens, Amiens, France
- Gare du Nord, a former station on Paris Metro Line 5, today a training center
- Gare de Metz-Nord, a train station in Metz
- Gare de Mulhouse-Nord, a train station in Mulhouse

=== Romania ===
- Bucharest North railway station, also called Gara de Nord

=== Switzerland ===
- Corcelles-Nord railway station, in Corcelles-près-Payerne, Vaud
- Pully-Nord railway station, in Pully, Vaud

== Other ==
- Gare du Nord, a French film by Claire Simon (2013)
- Gare du Nord, a street name in Amsterdam-Noord, Netherlands
- Gare du Nord, a Dutch/Belgian jazz band

== See also ==
- Media related to Gare du Nord at Wikimedia Commons
- North Station (disambiguation)
- Estación del Norte (disambiguation)
- Nordbahnhof (disambiguation)
