= Giswil railway station =

Railway station in Switzerland

Giswil
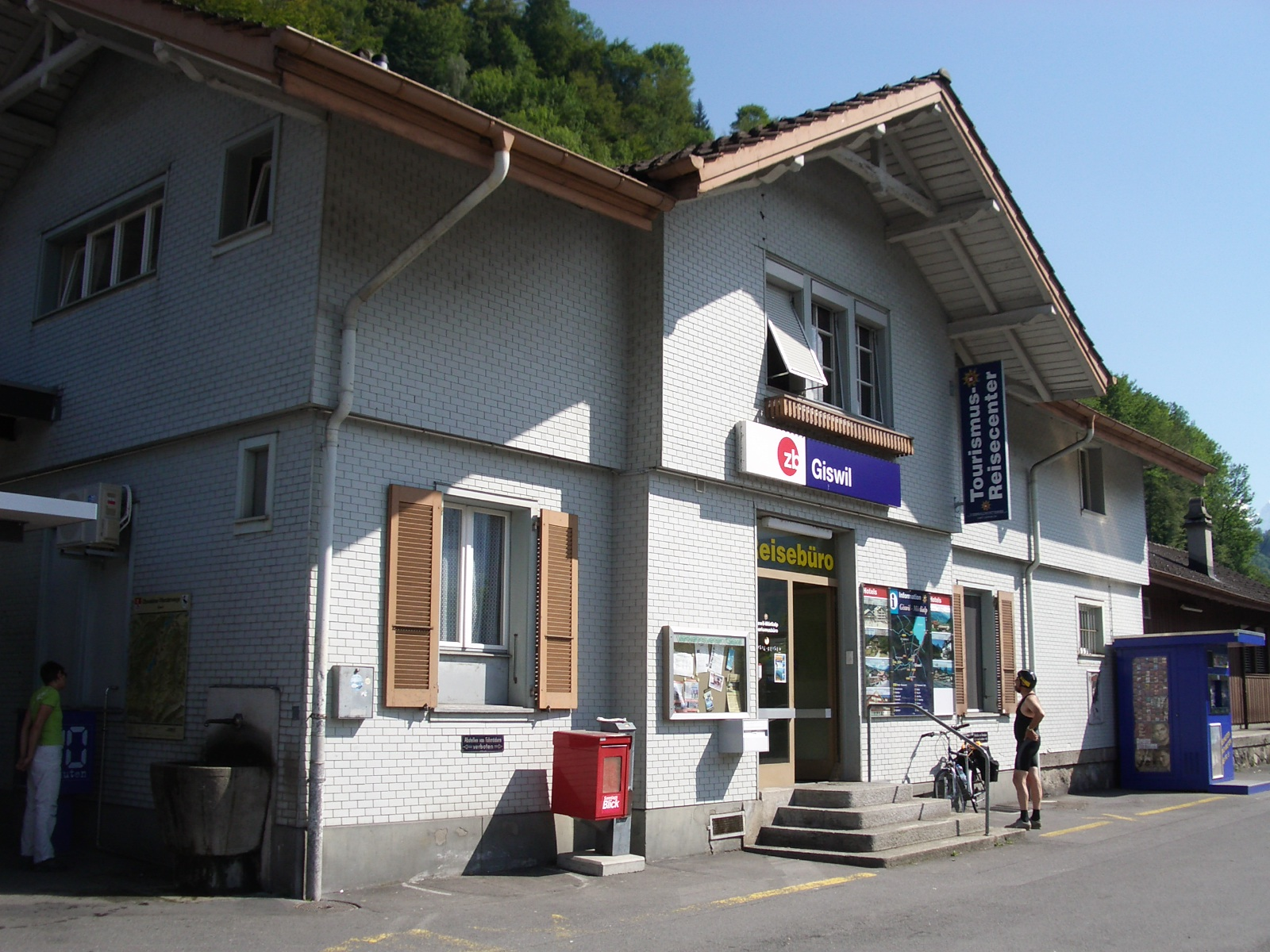
- The station building in 2007

General information
- Location: Giswil; Switzerland
- Coordinates: 46°50′12″N 8°11′11″E
- Elevation: 485 m (1,591 ft)
- Owner: Zentralbahn
- Line: Brünig line
- Train operators: Zentralbahn

Services
Preceding station	Zentralbahn	Following station
Kaiserstuhl OW towards Interlaken Ost	Panorama Express Luzern-Interlaken Express	Sachseln towards Lucerne
Preceding station	Lucerne S-Bahn	Following station
Terminus	S5	Ewil Maxon towards Lucerne
Location
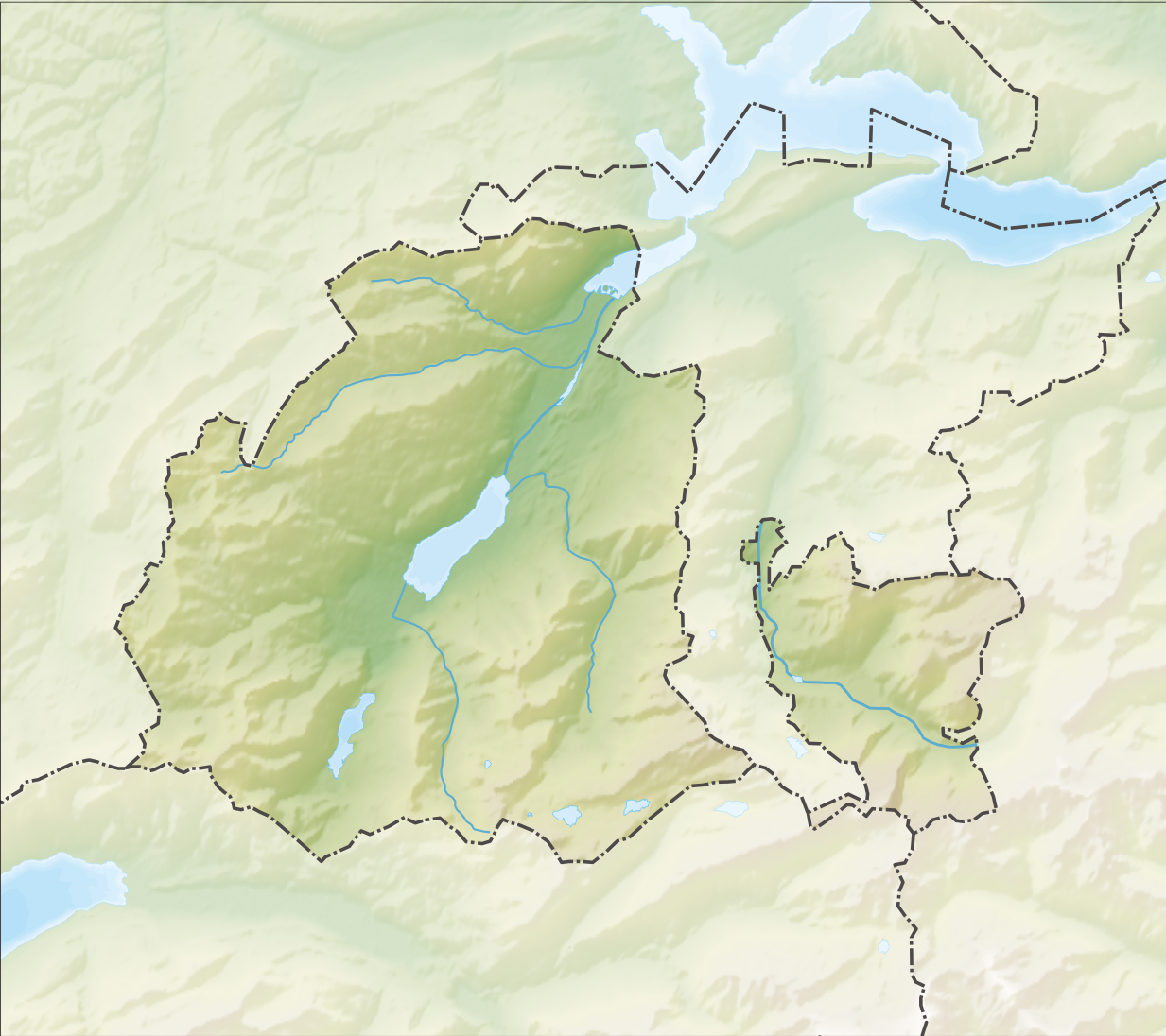
- Location within Switzerland Location within Canton of Obwalden

Giswil is a Swiss railway station on the Brünig line, owned by the Zentralbahn, that links Lucerne and Interlaken. The station is in the municipality of Giswil in the canton of Obwalden.

The line from Giswil over the Brünig Pass towards Interlaken is equipped with rack rails, and Giswil is the furthest station from Lucerne that can be served by trains not fitted with rack equipment.

== Services ==
The following services stop at Giswil:

- Panorama Express Luzern-Interlaken Express: hourly service between Lucerne and Interlaken Ost.
- Lucerne S-Bahn S5: half-hourly service to Lucerne.

== Gallery ==
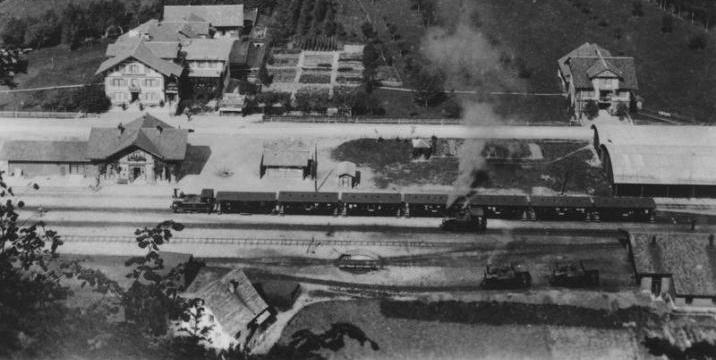
The station in 1890

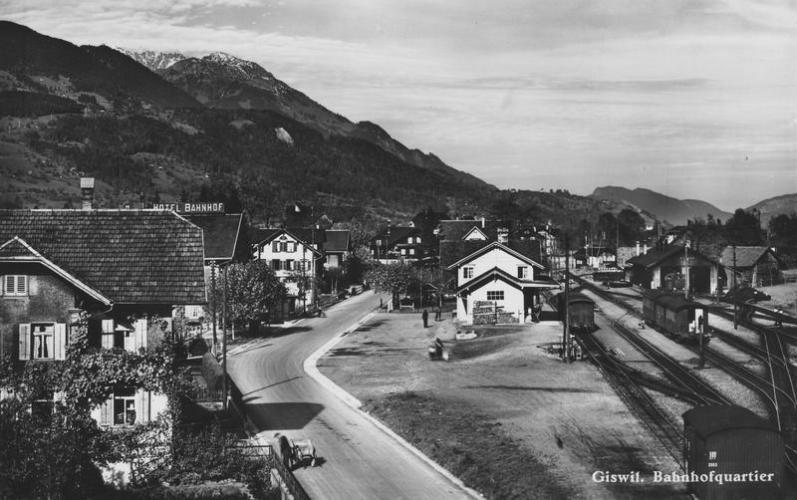
The station in 1930

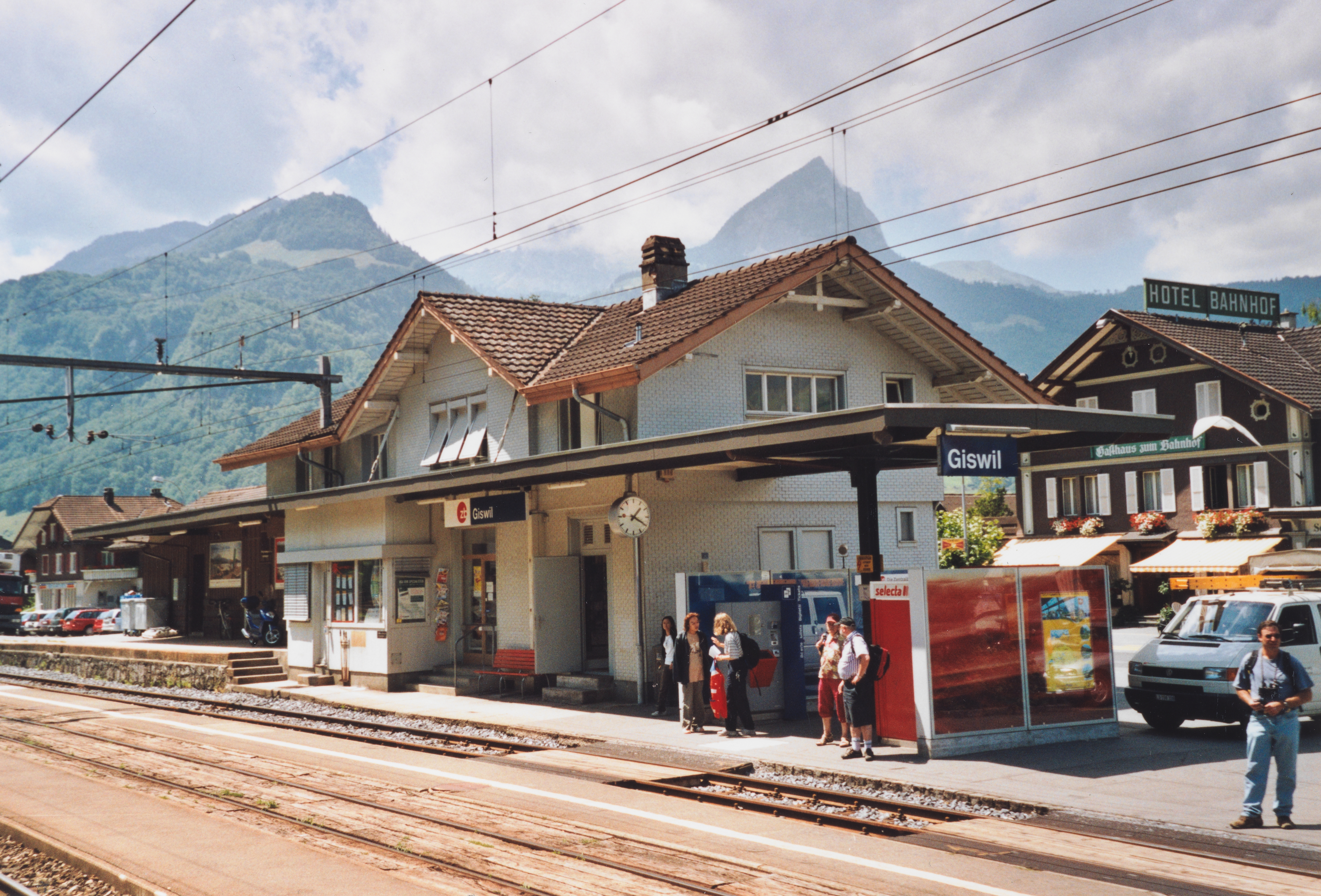
station building in 1999

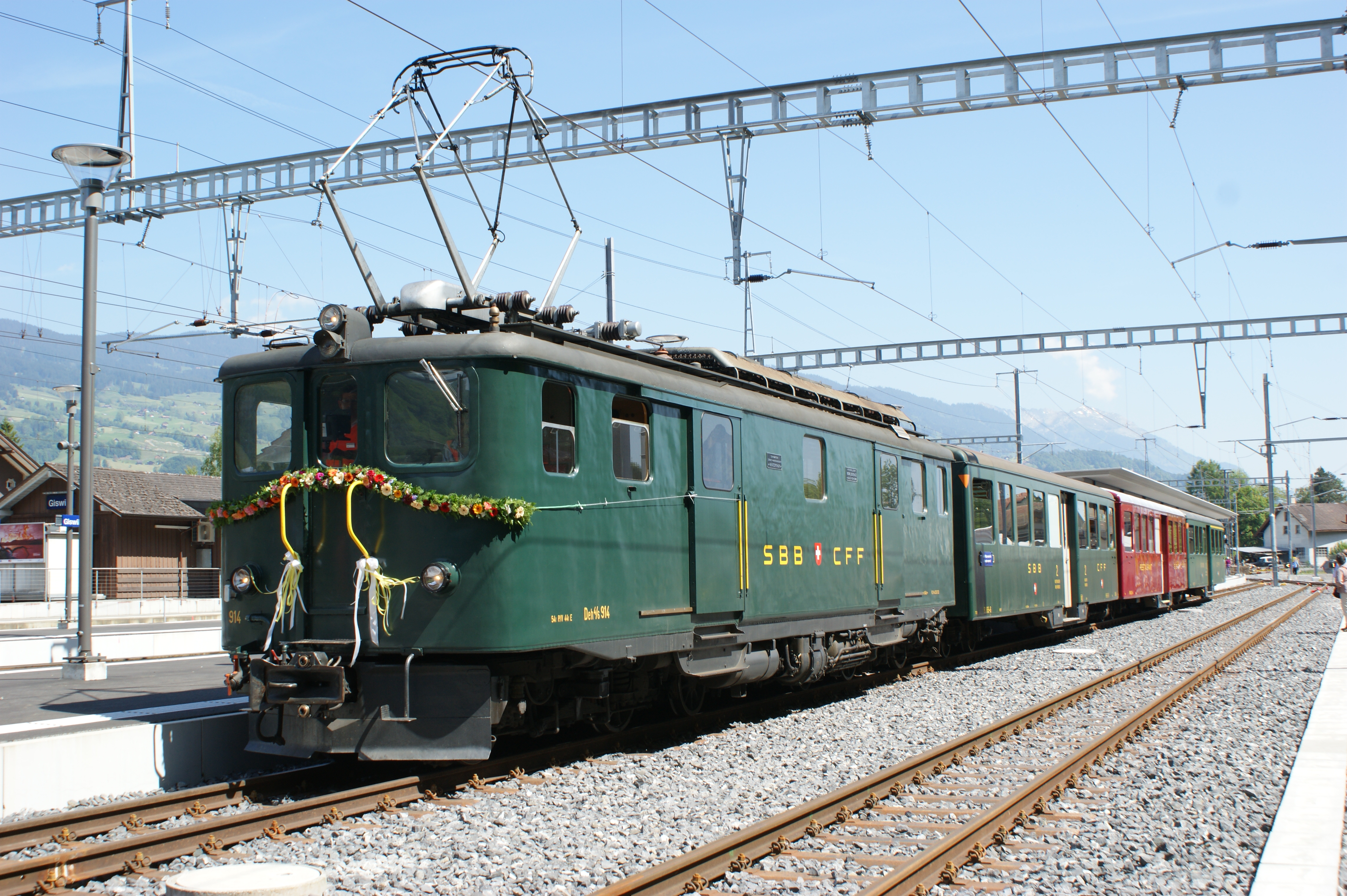
Historic train on the 125th anniversary of the Brünig line in Giswil station (2013)

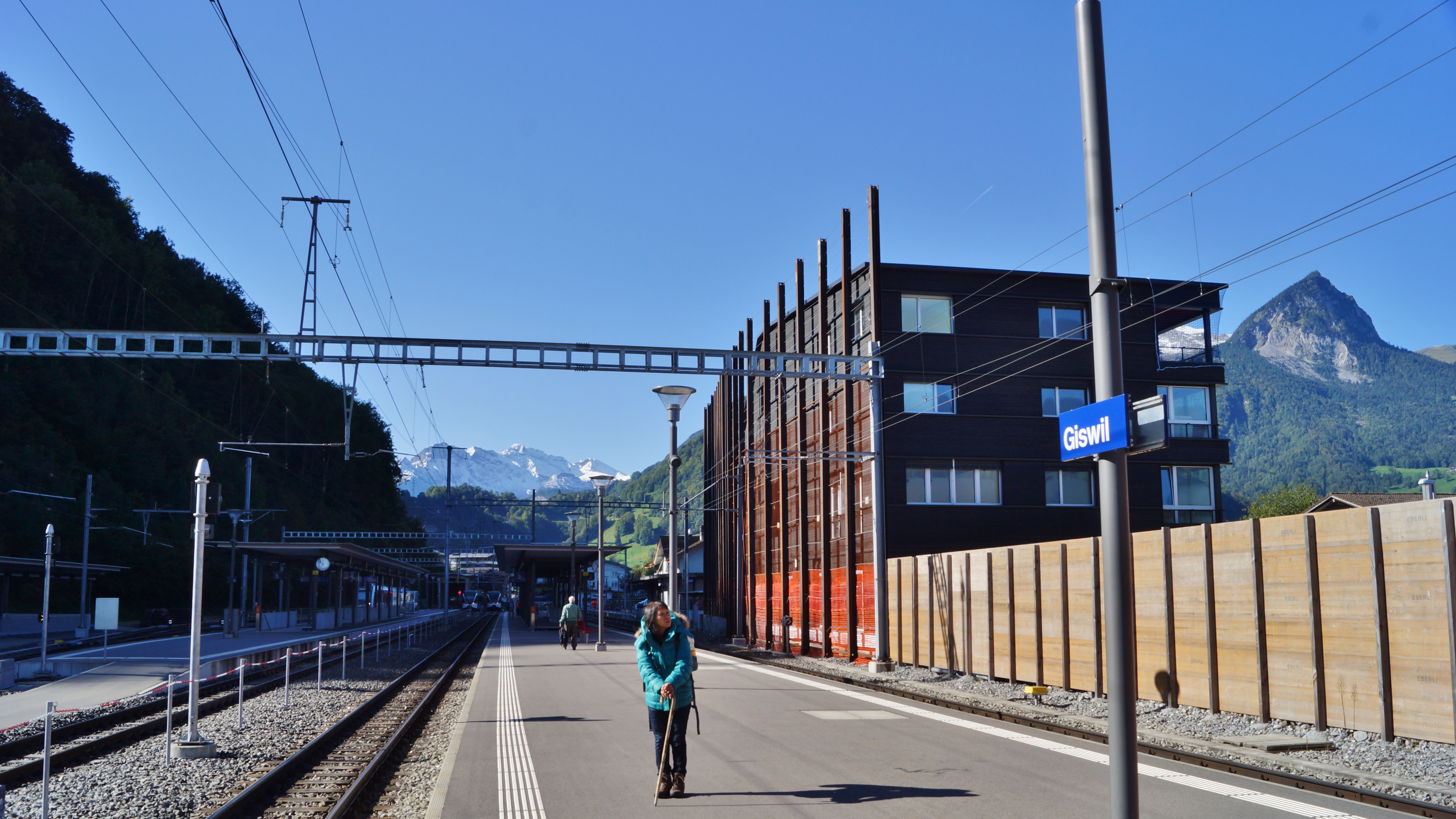
station in 2017
