= List of cultural property of national significance in Switzerland: Obwalden =

This list contains all cultural property of national significance (class A) in the canton of Obwalden from the 2009 Swiss Inventory of Cultural Property of National and Regional Significance. It is sorted by municipality and contains 22 individual buildings, 6 collections, 3 archaeological finds and 1 special site or object.

The geographic coordinates provided are in the Swiss coordinate system as given in the Inventory.

== Alpnach ==
| KGS No.^{?} | Picture | Name | Street Address | CH1903 X coordinate | CH1903 Y coordinate | Location |
|---|---|---|---|---|---|---|
| 9742 | Pilatus Railway and Station | Pilatus Railway and Station | Brünigstrasse 4, Alpnachstad | 663.800 | 200.850 | 46.955663°N 8.276806°E |
| 4244 | | Uechteren, Roman Manor House | | 663.100 | 198.550 | 46.935042°N 8.267291°E |

== Engelberg ==
| KGS No.^{?} | Picture | Name | Street Address | CH1903 X coordinate | CH1903 Y coordinate | Location |
|---|---|---|---|---|---|---|
| 8914 | Benedictine Abbey with Library, Collections, Abbey Archives and Musical Collection | Benedictine Abbey with Library, Collections, Abbey Archives and Musical Collection | | 674.063 | 185.950 | 46.820578°N 8.409202°E |
| 4249 | Noble House in Grafenort with Garden Pavillon | Noble House in Grafenort with Garden Pavillon | | 671.138 | 191.384 | 46.869774°N 8.371721°E |
| 4250 | Heilige Kreuz Chapel | Heilige Kreuz Chapel | Grafenort | 671.240 | 191.370 | 46.869637°N 8.373057°E |

== Giswil ==
| KGS No.^{?} | Picture | Name | Street Address | CH1903 X coordinate | CH1903 Y coordinate | Location |
|---|---|---|---|---|---|---|
| Unknown | | ISOS Special Site: Rudenz | | | | |

== Kerns ==
| KGS No.^{?} | Picture | Name | Street Address | CH1903 X coordinate | CH1903 Y coordinate | Location |
|---|---|---|---|---|---|---|
| 4266 | Farm House Im Huwel | Farm House Im Huwel | Wiesenstrasse | 663.670 | 195.073 | 46.903713°N 8.27429°E |
| 4263 | Farm House in der Grosshostett | Farm House in der Grosshostett | | 665.385 | 193.474 | 46.889164°N 8.296568°E |
| 9648 | | Early Modern Seasonal Settlement of Melchtal | | 664.200 | 188.000 | 46.840041°N 8.28025°E |
| 4264 | St. Nikolaus Chapel | St. Nikolaus Chapel | St. Niklausen | 664.050 | 191.340 | 46.870099°N 8.278752°E |
| 9647 | | Melchsee Frutt, Medieval / Early Modern Abandoned Alpine Settlement | | 664.250 | 180.700 | 46.774374°N 8.279879°E |

== Lungern ==
| KGS No.^{?} | Picture | Name | Street Address | CH1903 X coordinate | CH1903 Y coordinate | Location |
|---|---|---|---|---|---|---|
| Unknown | | ISOS Urbanized Village: Lungern | | | | |
| Unknown | | ISOS Hamlet: Obsee | | | | |

== Sachseln ==
| KGS No.^{?} | Picture | Name | Street Address | CH1903 X coordinate | CH1903 Y coordinate | Location |
|---|---|---|---|---|---|---|
| 4283 | Bruder Klaus Place of Birth | Bruder Klaus Place of Birth | Flüeli-Ranft | 663.193 | 191.502 | 46.871638°N 8.267535°E |
| 4285 | Bruder-Klaus House | Bruder-Klaus House | Flüeli-Ranft | 663.342 | 191.550 | 46.872055°N 8.269496°E |
| 9745 | Former Kurhaus Nünalphorn | Former Kurhaus Nünalphorn | Hotel Paxmontana, Flüeli-Ranft | 663.425 | 191.708 | 46.873469°N 8.270606°E |
| 9744 | Grabkapelle | Grabkapelle | Dorfstrasse | 661.096 | 191.008 | 46.86739°N 8.239964°E |
| 4284 | St. Karl Borromäus Chapel | St. Karl Borromäus Chapel | Flüeli-Ranft | 663.250 | 191.590 | 46.872424°N 8.268295°E |
| 4289 | Catholic Parish and Pilgrimage Church of St. Theodul | Catholic Parish and Pilgrimage Church of St. Theodul | Dorfstrasse | 661.090 | 191.034 | 46.867625°N 8.239889°E |
| 4286 | Obere Ranft Chapel with Bruder Klaus' Hermitage | Obere Ranft Chapel with Bruder Klaus' Hermitage | Flüeli-Ranft | 663.470 | 191.290 | 46.869704°N 8.271138°E |
| 4287 | Untere Ranft Chapel | Untere Ranft Chapel | Flüeli-Ranft | 663.560 | 191.180 | 46.868706°N 8.272303°E |
| Unknown | | ISOS Urbanized Village: Sachseln | | | | |
| Unknown | | ISOS Special Site: Flüeli-Ranft | | | | |

== Sarnen ==
| KGS No.^{?} | Picture | Name | Street Address | CH1903 X coordinate | CH1903 Y coordinate | Location |
|---|---|---|---|---|---|---|
| 9743 | Ossuary of St. Michael | Ossuary of St. Michael | Kirchhofen | 660.920 | 193.920 | 46.893599°N 8.238045°E |
| 4300 | Double House am Grund | Double House am Grund | Grossgasse / Grundstrasse | 661.535 | 194.089 | 46.895063°N 8.246138°E |
| 4302 | Double House Grundacher | Double House Grundacher | Gesellenweg 4 | 661.689 | 193.963 | 46.893915°N 8.248141°E |
| 4308 | Hexenturm | Hexenturm | Kirchstrasse | 661.349 | 194.156 | 46.895683°N 8.243706°E |
| 4304 | Catholic Parish Church of St. Peter and Paul | Catholic Parish Church of St. Peter and Paul | Kirchhofen | 660.920 | 193.920 | 46.893599°N 8.238045°E |
| 4303 | Kollegiumskirche St. Martin | Kollegiumskirche St. Martin | Brünigstrasse | 661.500 | 193.722 | 46.891765°N 8.245629°E |
| 4305 | Rathaus (legislative building of Obwalden) | Rathaus (legislative building of Obwalden) | Dorfplatz 8 | 661.452 | 194.199 | 46.89606°N 8.245063°E |
| 4301 | Musical Collection of the Frauenkloster | Musical Collection of the Frauenkloster | | 661.490 | 193.960 | 46.893907°N 8.24553°E |
| 4299 | Landenberg Armory | Landenberg Armory | | 661.370 | 194.270 | 46.896706°N 8.243997°E |
| 8973 | State Archives of Obwalden | State Archives of Obwalden | Verwaltungsgebäude Hostett, St. Antonistrasse 4 | 661.748 | 194.054 | 46.894728°N 8.248928°E |
| Unknown | | ISOS Small City: Sarnen | | | | |
| Unknown | | ISOS Hamlet: Ramersberg | | | | |
| Unknown | ISOS Special Site: Kirchhofen | ISOS Special Site: Kirchhofen | | | | |
