= List of listed buildings in Torryburn, Fife =

This is a list of listed buildings in the parish of Torryburn in Fife, Scotland.

== List ==
Name	Location	Date listed	Grid ref. (Note: Sometimes known as OSGB36, the grid reference (where provided) is based on the British national grid reference system used by the Ordnance Survey. • "Guide to National Grid". Ordnance Survey. • "Get-a-map". Ordnance Survey.)	Geo-coordinates	Notes	LB number (Note: Historic Environment Scotland assign a unique alphanumeric identifier to each designated site in Scotland, for listed buildings this always begins with "LB", for example "LB12345".)	Image
4/4A Low Causeway Torryburn				56°03′27″N 3°34′13″W	Category B	16631	Upload Photo
79 And 81 ("Rockvale") Main Street, Low Torry				56°03′35″N 3°34′46″W	Category B	16638	Upload Photo
Inzievar House And Inzievar Stables And Coach-Houses				56°04′31″N 3°33′58″W	Category B	16642	Upload Photo
'Viewforth' Crombie Point				56°02′41″N 3°33′17″W	Category B	16647	Upload Photo
Bridge At Shawhill Plantation, Torrie Estate				56°03′54″N 3°35′03″W	Category C(S)	16651	Upload Photo
House (Mrs Hendrick's) Oakumbay Of Shore Road Newmills				56°03′36″N 3°35′13″W	Category C(S)	16652	Upload Photo
Inzievar Doocot, Fernwoodle				56°04′16″N 3°34′31″W	Category C(S)	16626	Upload Photo
Crombie Point House				56°02′42″N 3°33′18″W	Category C(S)	16646	Upload Photo
Drybridge Torrie Estate				56°03′45″N 3°35′04″W	Category C(S)	16650	Upload Photo
Valleyfield Wood, Policies Of Valleyfield House, Ice House				56°04′06″N 3°36′01″W	Category C(S)	19121	Upload Photo
Gardener's Lodge The Gardens Craigflower Estate				56°03′01″N 3°33′36″W	Category B	16635	Upload Photo
Torryburn Parish Kirk, Main Street, Torryburn				56°03′29″N 3°33′57″W	Category C(S)	16644	Upload Photo
Drumfin Farmhouse				56°03′52″N 3°33′13″W	Category B	49881	Upload Photo
Drumfin Doocot, Drumfin Farm				56°03′50″N 3°33′11″W	Category B	16627	Upload Photo
"Lilac Cottages" Low Causeway Torryburn				56°03′27″N 3°34′14″W	Category B	16632	Upload Photo
Over Inzievar Farmhouse				56°04′42″N 3°35′22″W	Category B	16643	Upload Photo
Old Manse 136 Main Street				56°03′28″N 3°34′00″W	Category C(S)	16629	Upload Photo
16 Main Street, Newmills				56°03′36″N 3°35′12″W	Category C(S)	16636	Upload Photo
28 And 30 ("Ryefield") Main Street, Newmills				56°03′36″N 3°35′10″W	Category B	16637	Upload Photo
91 Main Street ("Ellenbank") Low Torry				56°03′35″N 3°34′40″W	Category B	16639	Upload Photo
Stripeside House Craigflower Estate				56°02′47″N 3°33′20″W	Category B	16645	Upload Photo
Torryburn Craigflower School				56°03′25″N 3°34′07″W	Category B	16649	Upload Photo
Valleyfield Wood, Policies Of Valleyfield House, Rustic Bridge 1				56°03′55″N 3°35′39″W	Category B	19122	Upload Photo
Valleyfield Wood, Policies Of Valleyfield House, Rustic Bridge 2				56°04′00″N 3°35′46″W	Category B	19123	Upload Photo
Gateway And Lodge. Torrie Estate				56°03′36″N 3°35′06″W	Category B	16615	Upload Photo
Newmills - Low Torry Village Newmills Bridge Over Bluther Burn				56°03′38″N 3°35′19″W	Category B	16616	Upload Photo
Newmills Old Bridge Over Bluther Burn				56°03′39″N 3°35′17″W	Category C(S)	16617	Upload Photo
Torryburn Parish Session House, Torryburn				56°03′29″N 3°33′58″W	Category C(S)	16628	Upload Photo
101 ("Albert Cottage") 103 ("Hilldrop") Main Street, Low Torry				56°03′35″N 3°34′38″W	Category B	16640	Upload Photo
Tinian House Low Torry				56°03′35″N 3°34′29″W	Category B	16641	Upload Photo
Torrie House				56°03′47″N 3°34′58″W	Category B	16648	Upload Photo
Valleyfield Wood, Policies Of Valleyfield House, Walled Garden, Ha-Ha To N, Gateway To W And Bridge To W Of Canal				56°04′08″N 3°36′00″W	Category B	19120	Upload Photo
"Ship Cottage" 3 Low Causeway, Torryburn				56°03′26″N 3°34′13″W	Category B	16630	Upload Photo
"The Witches Tower" The Gardens Craigflower Estate				56°03′00″N 3°33′31″W	Category B	16634	Upload Photo

== Key ==
The scheme for classifying buildings in Scotland is:

- Category A: "buildings of national or international importance, either architectural or historic; or fine, little-altered examples of some particular period, style or building type."
- Category B: "buildings of regional or more than local importance; or major examples of some particular period, style or building type, which may have been altered."
- Category C: "buildings of local importance; lesser examples of any period, style, or building type, as originally constructed or moderately altered; and simple traditional buildings which group well with other listed buildings."

In March 2016 there were 47,288 listed buildings in Scotland. Of these, 8% were Category A, and 50% were Category B, with the remaining 42% being Category C.

== See also ==
- List of listed buildings in Fife
