= Hotel Paxmontana =

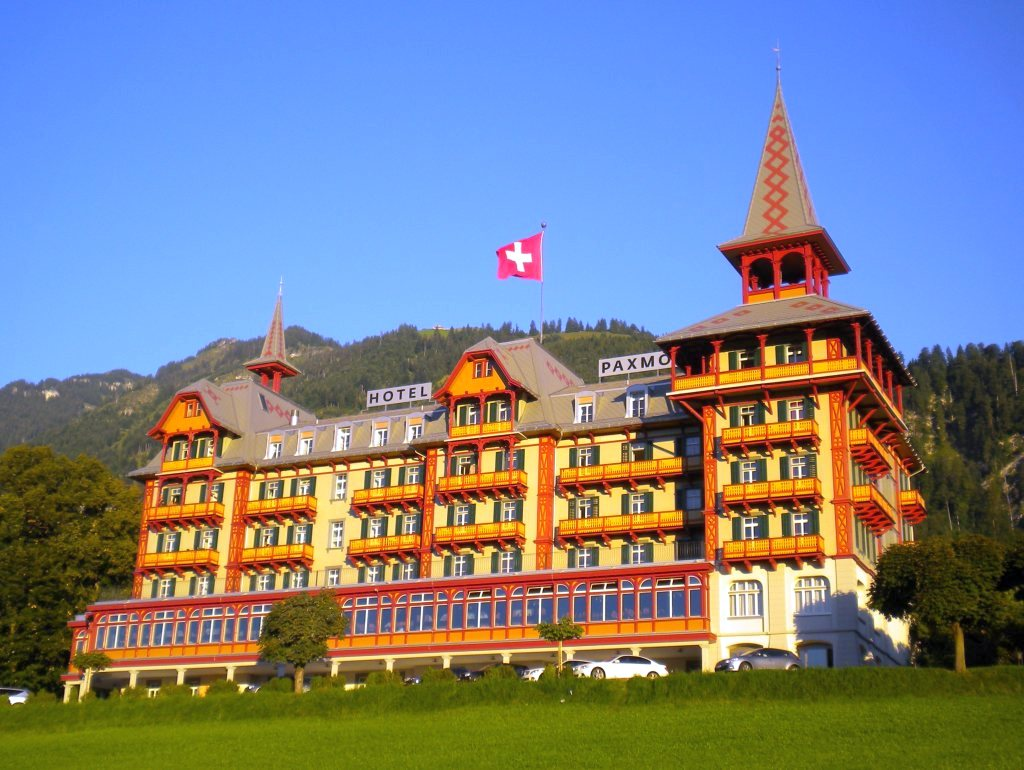
- The Hotel after renovation in 2013

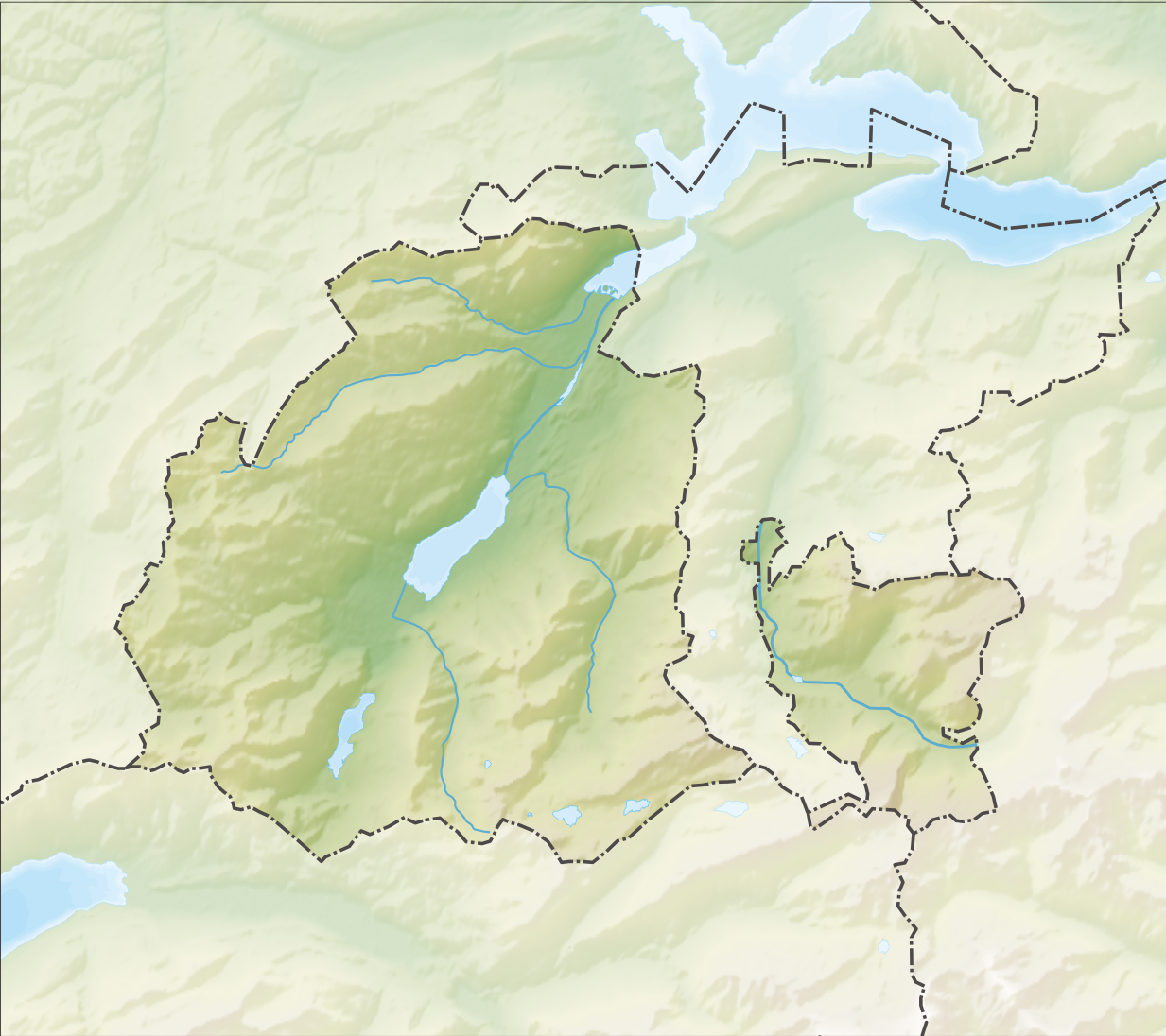
- Location within Switzerland Location within Canton of Obwalden

General information
- Location: Flüeli-Ranft, Sachseln, Obwalden, Switzerland
- Coordinates: 46°52′24.5″N 8°16′14″E
- Opened: 1896

Design and construction
- Architects: Heinrich Walter Schumacher and Otto Schnyder

Other information
- Number of rooms: 83
- Number of restaurants: 1

The Hotel Paxmontana is a Grade II listed Art Nouveau hotel in Flüeli-Ranft, Sachseln, Obwalden, in central Switzerland. A four-story mansion in the grand old Victorian resort style, it was built in 1896 as Kurhaus Nünalphorn by the tourism pioneer Franz Hess-Michel. In the 1950s, it was renamed the Paxmontana. It was extensively restored between 1999 and 2011. Its restaurant has a distinct 47 metres (154 ft) long veranda at the front. The hotel is listed as a cultural property of national significance.

== History ==
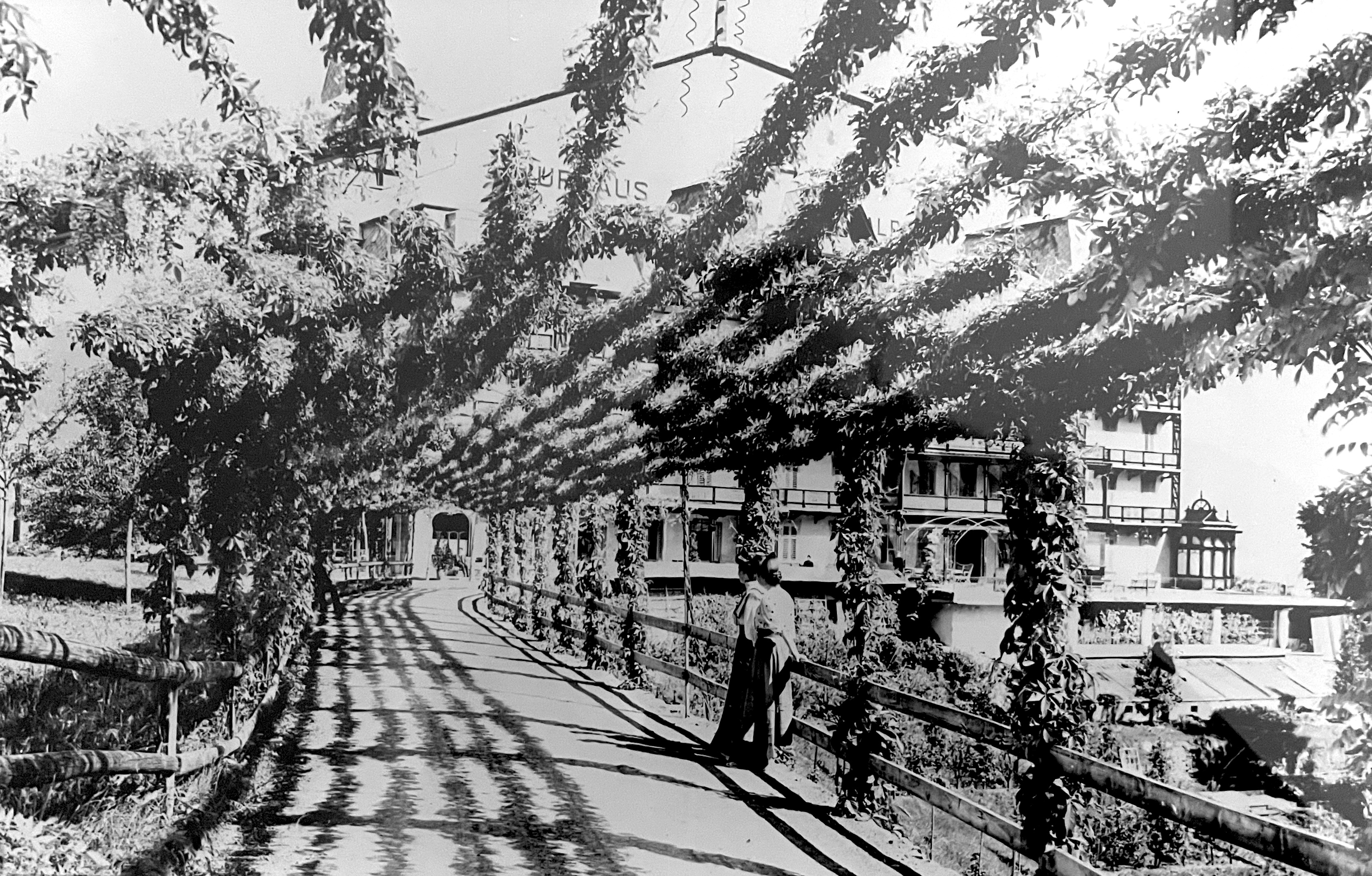
The hotel in 1910

The hotel, a four-storey mansion in the grand old Victorian resort style, was originally built in 1896 as a modern flat roof construction, but it was given its characteristic towers at the beginning of the 20th century. The Lucerne architects Heinrich Walter Schumacher and Otto Schnyder extended the building in 1905-1906 by two storeys in response to the increasing demand for upscale accommodation by tourists. By 1938, the owner Franz Hess had fallen into financial difficulties and the hotel was taken over by the Obwaldner Kantonalbank. In 1953 the Bruder Klausen Foundation acquired the hotel, and three years later it was renamed the "Paxmontana".

Since 1999, the hotel has been renovated in stages, with renovation of the terrazzo floors, stucco ceilings and ceiling paintings. From the fall of 2009 to December 2011, the hotel was closed for a major refurbishment at a cost of 26 million francs, with the installation of a new elevator, constructional reinforcement with fire and earthquake protection, new seminar rooms in the basement and a new kitchen. Likewise, the façade was completely renovated and the roof with the tower structures was repainted with the original pattern of the bricks.

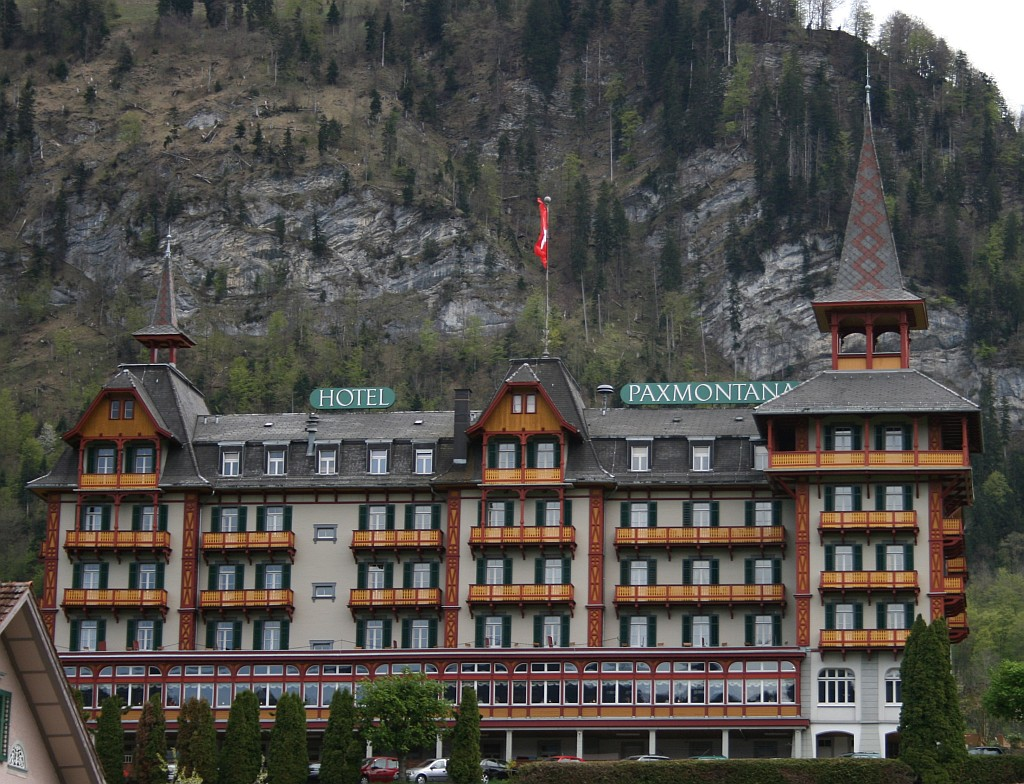
The hotel in 2009 prior to renovation of the façade

In 2002 the Swiss National Group of the International Council on Monuments and Sites (ICOMOS) awarded Paxmontana special recognition for restoration according to monument preservation criteria and in 2014 it was awarded the Special Award for Historic Hotel of the Year.

== Restaurant and rooms ==
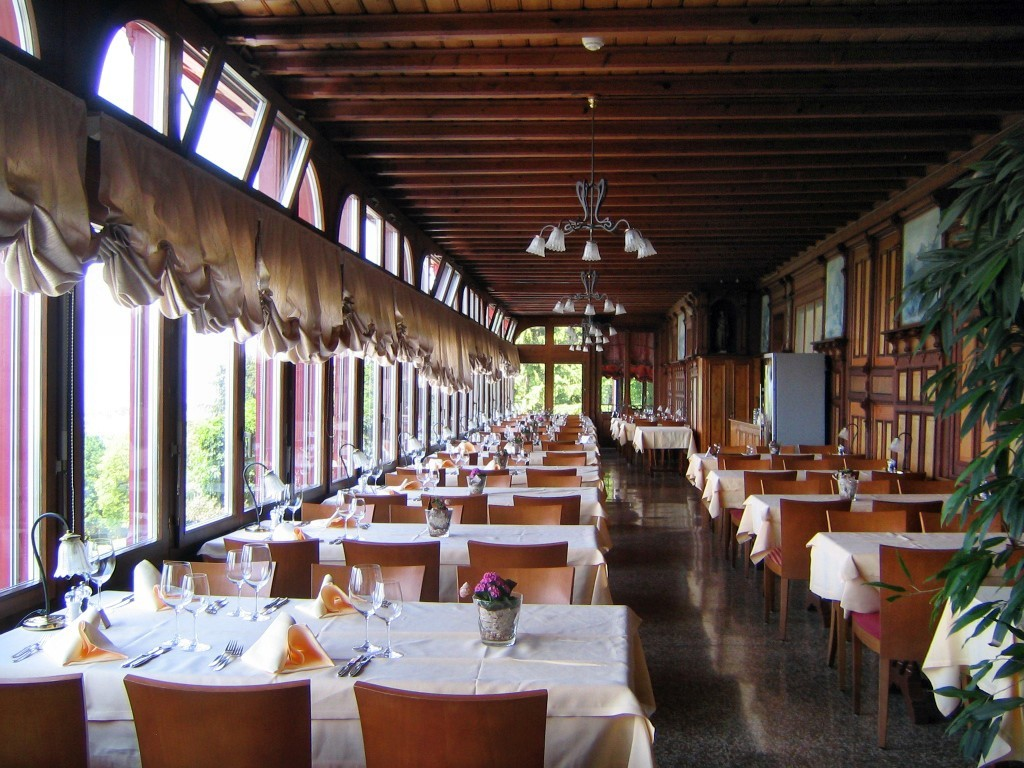
The hotel's Restaurant Veranda

The restaurant is noted for its 47 metres (154 ft) long veranda at the front, overlooking the Sarneraatal and the Glaubenberg. 4 of the 83 rooms are furnished with the furniture of the original hotel.

== See also ==
- List of hotels in Switzerland
- List of restaurants in Switzerland
- Tourism in Switzerland
