= Franz Bucher =

Swiss artist (born 1940)

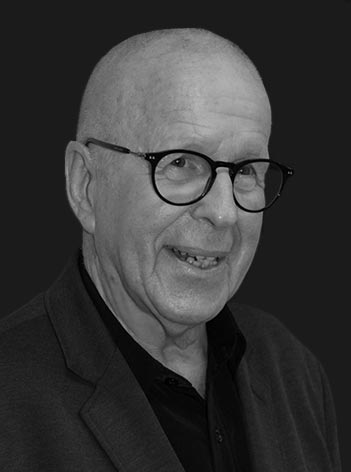
- Born: 15 January 1940 (age 86); Sarnen, Obwalden, Switzerland
- Known for: Artist

Franz Bucher (born 15 January 1940) is a Swiss artist.

== Biography ==
=== Early life and education ===
Franz Bucher was born in 1940 in Sarnen, Obwalden, Switzerland. He attended schools in Sarnen and St. Michael's College, Zug. Between 1957-62, he worked as a painter and decorator. During this time, he worked in places such as Lucerne, Basel and Zürich. Following this, he studied at the Arts-&-Crafts School and High School for Applied Arts in Basel and Lucerne. In 1965 he received a scholarship from the Canton Obwalden. During his time at these schools, Bucher submitted his first works to exhibitions.
