= Sarnen =

- Municipality
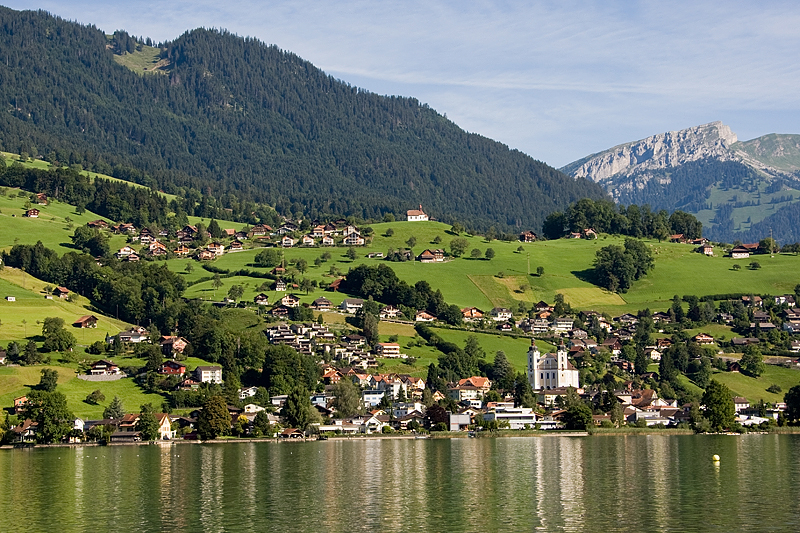

- Flag Coat of arms
- Location of Sarnen
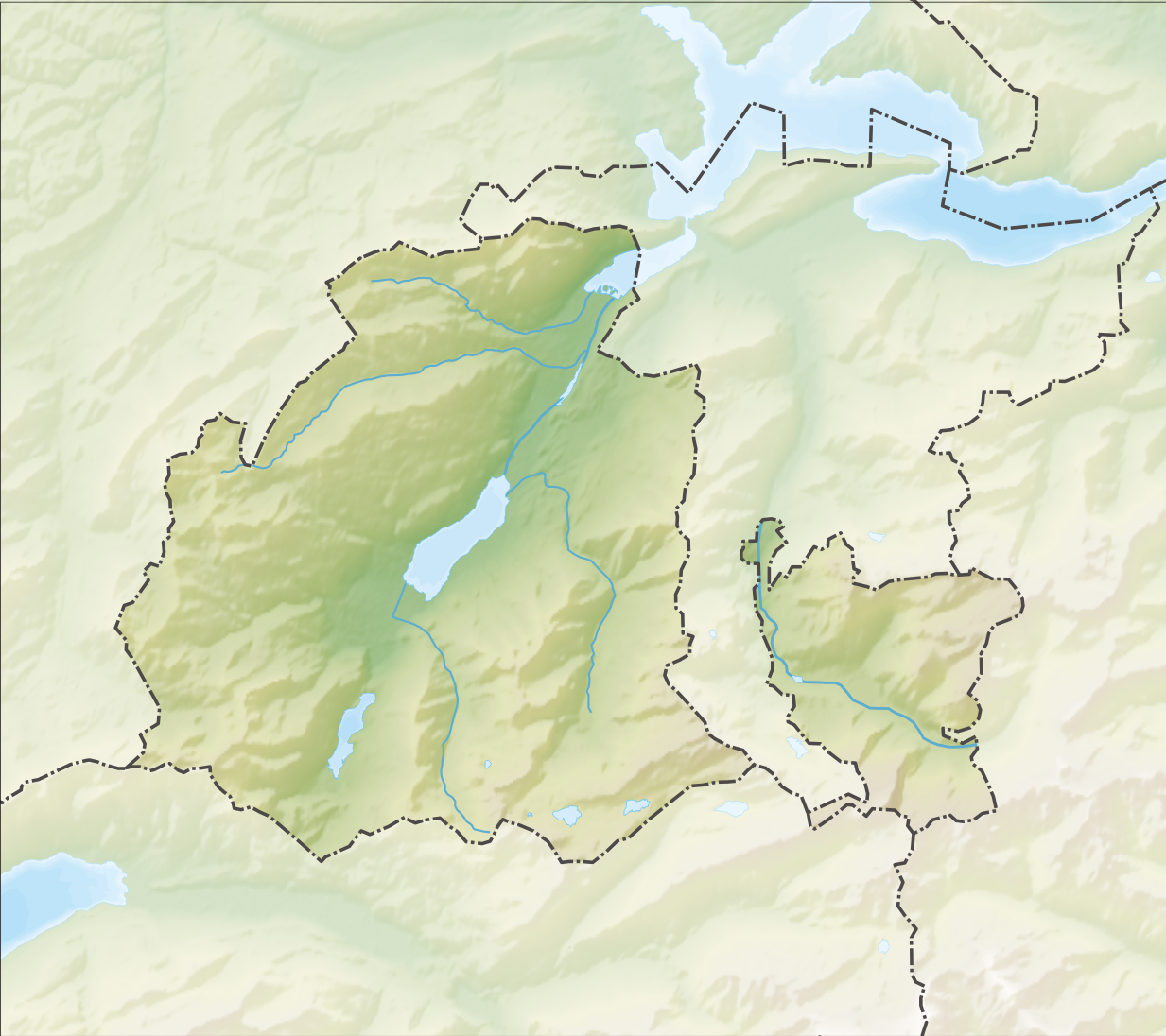
- Location within Switzerland Location within Canton of Obwalden
- Coordinates: 46°53′46″N 8°14′44″E
- Country: Switzerland
- Canton: Obwalden
- District: n.a.

Government
  - Executive: Gemeinderat with 7 members
  - Mayor: Gemeindepräsident; Jürg Berlinger (as of 2018)
  - Parliament: none (Gemeindeversammlung)

Area
  - Total: 76.88 km^{2} (29.68 sq mi)
- Elevation (Dorfkapelle): 471 m (1,545 ft)

Population (December 2020)
  - Total: 10,514
  - Density: 136.8/km^{2} (354.2/sq mi)
- Demonym: German: Sarner(in)
- Time zone: UTC+01:00 (CET)
  - Summer (DST): UTC+02:00 (CEST)
- Postal codes: 6056 Kägiswil, 6060 Sarnen, 6060 Ramersberg, 6062 Wilen, 6063 Stalden
- SFOS number: 1407
- ISO 3166 code: CH-OW
- Localities: Sarnen-Dorfschaft, Kägiswil, Schwendi/Wilen, and Ramersberg
- Surrounded by: Alpnach, Entlebuch (LU), Flühli (LU), Giswil, Hasle (LU), Kerns, Sachseln
- Website: www.sarnen.ch

Sarnen (Swiss Standard German pronunciation: [ˈzarnən]) is a small historic town, a municipality, and the capital of the canton of Obwalden situated on the northern shores of Lake Sarnen (German: Sarnersee) in Switzerland. It has a population of just over 10,000 and is surrounded by countryside and mountains. Sarnen is located 20 km south of Lucerne.

== History ==
Stone Age and Bronze Age finds show that the Sarnen valley was inhabited from the earliest times. Over the years Sarnen developed into an important trading center.

== Geography ==
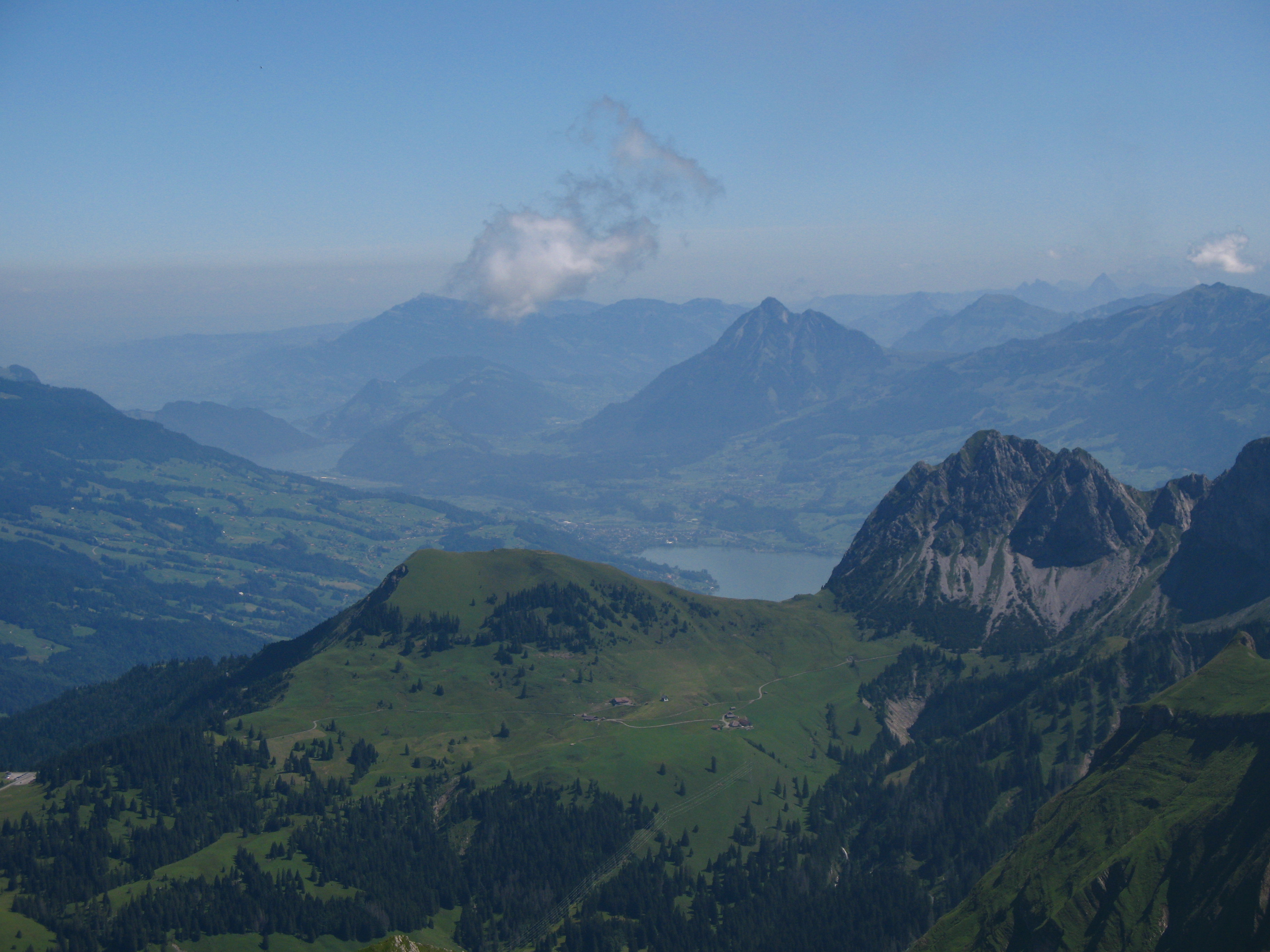
View from Brienzer Rothorn with Sarnen and Lake Sarnen in the background

Aerial view from 150 m by Walter Mittelholzer (1919)

Sarnen is situated at an altitude of 471 m (1,545 ft) on the northern shore of Lake Sarnen (German: Sarnersee) along the outflow of the Sarner Aa. Lake Sarnen covers approximately an area of 7.5 km^{2} (2.9 sq mi). The town is surrounded by mountain chains and a protected bog can be found nearby. The most well-known mountain close to Sarnen is Mount Pilatus with an elevation of 2,132 m (6,995 ft).

Sarnen has an area, (as of the 2004/09 survey) of 73.12 km^{2} (28.23 sq mi). Of this area, about 39.0% is used for agricultural purposes, while 50.7% is forested. Of the rest of the land, 6.0% is settled (buildings or roads) and 4.3% is unproductive land. In the 2004/09 survey a total of 260 ha (640 acres) or about 3.6% of the total area was covered with buildings, an increase of 78 ha (190 acres) over the 1980/81 amount. Of the agricultural land, 46 ha (110 acres) is used for orchards and vineyards, 1,554 ha (3,840 acres) is fields and grasslands and 1,665 ha (4,110 acres) consists of alpine grazing areas. Since 1980/81 the amount of agricultural land has decreased by 172 ha (430 acres). Over the same time period the amount of forested land has increased by 27 ha (67 acres). Rivers and lakes cover 111 ha (270 acres) in the municipality.

The municipality is made up of 5 sections; Sarnen (population 5,984), Stalden (pop. 1,072), Wilen (pop. 1,234), Kägiswil (pop. 1,214) and Ramersberg (pop. 294).

== Demographics ==
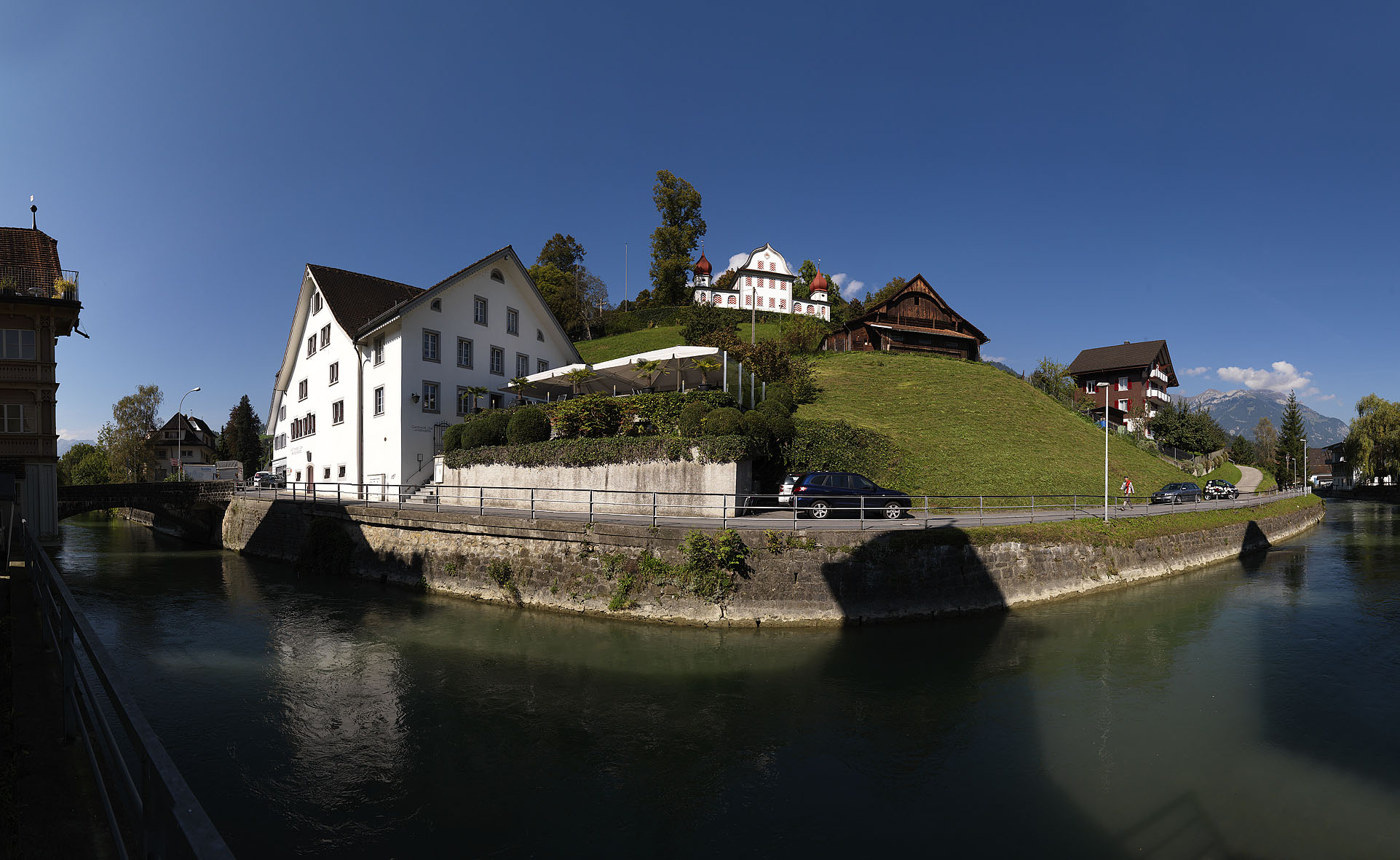
Houses around the Landenberg hill.

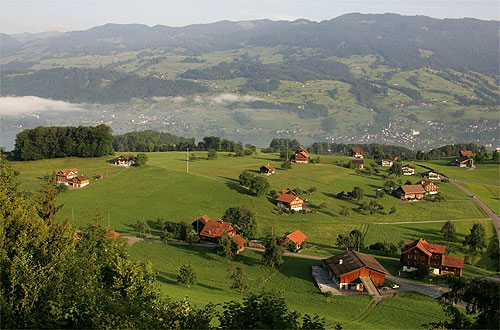
Flüeli-Ranft village above Sarnen.

Sarnen has a population (as of December 2020) of 10,514. As of 2014, 14.5% of the population are resident foreign nationals. Over the last 4 years (2010-2014) the population has changed at a rate of 2.62%. The birth rate in the municipality, in 2014, was 9.2, while the death rate was 6.6 per thousand residents.

Most of the population (as of 2000) speaks German (91.0%), with Italian being second most common (1.6%) and Albanian being third (1.6%). As of 2000 the gender distribution of the population was 49.9% male and 50.1% female.

As of 2014, children and teenagers (0–19 years old) make up 19.2% of the population, while adults (20–64 years old) are 62.1% and seniors (over 64 years old) make up 18.7%. In 2015 there were 4,418 single residents, 4,619 people who were married or in a civil partnership, 519 widows or widowers and 673 divorced residents.

As of 2000 there are 3,452 households in Sarnen. In 2014 there were 4,338 private households in Sarnen with an average household size of 2.32 persons. Of the 1,957 inhabited buildings in the municipality, in 2000, about 47.6% were single family homes and 26.7% were multiple family buildings. Additionally, about 24.4% of the buildings were built before 1919, while 14.9% were built between 1991 and 2000. In 2013 the rate of construction of new housing units per 1000 residents was 5.75. The vacancy rate for the municipality, in 2015, was 0.18%.

== Historic population ==
The historical population is given in the following table:

year	population
1945	5,723
1955	6,336
1965	6,686
1975	7,015
1985	7,956
1995	8,858
2000	9,218
2005	9,472
2006	9,512
2007	9,617
2008	9,798

== Heritage sites of national significance ==
Sarnen is home to 10 sites that are Swiss heritage sites of national significance. These include three religious buildings; the Ossuary of St. Michael, the parish church of St. Peter and Paul, the Church of St. Martin. Two houses and a tower, the double house am Grund and Grundacher and the Hexenturm are on the list. The remainder of the list contains the Cantonal Rathaus, the musical collection of the Frauenkloster, the Landenberg armory and the State Archives of Obwalden. The entire small city of Sarnen, the hamlet of Ramersberg and the Kirchhofen area are part of the Inventory of Swiss Heritage Sites.

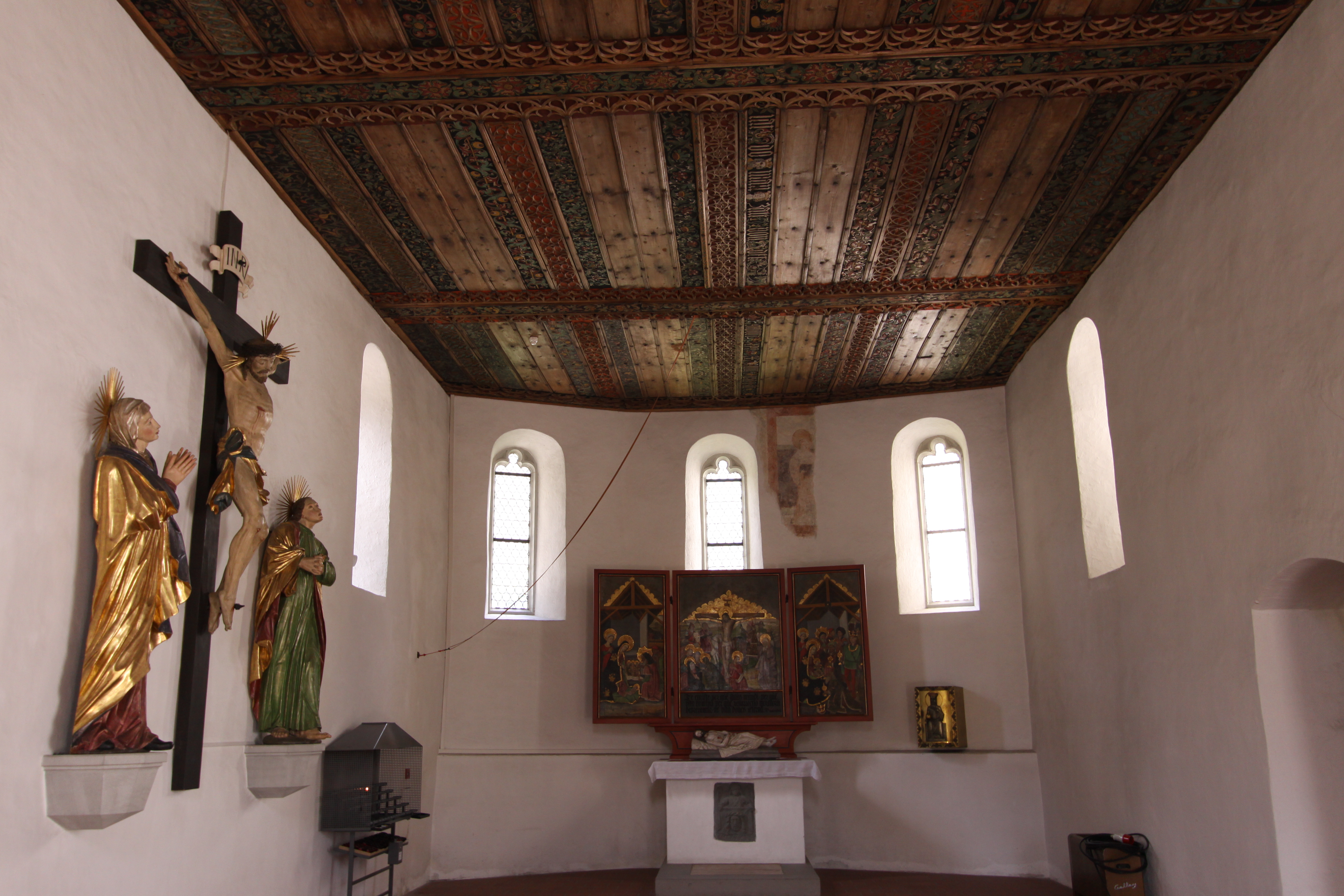
Ossuary of St. Michael

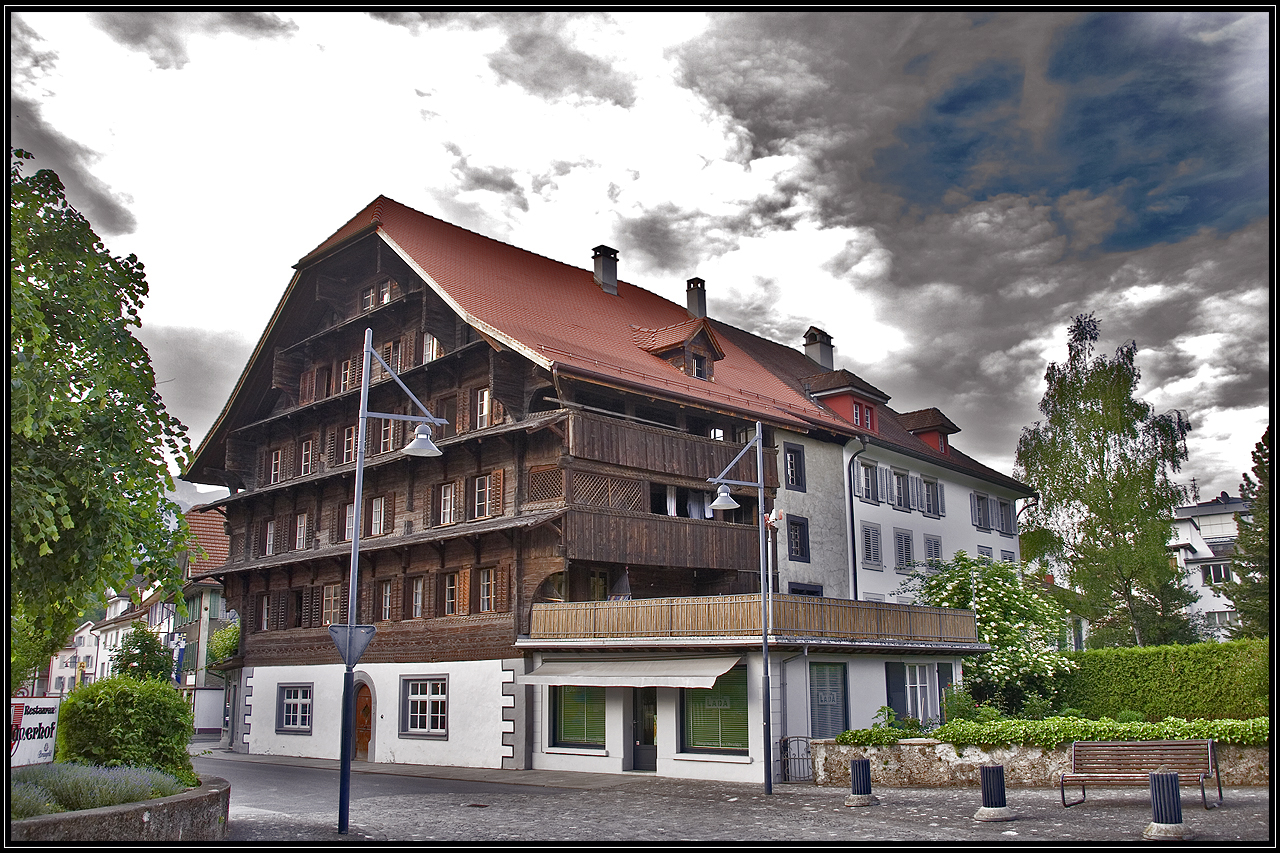
Double house am Grund

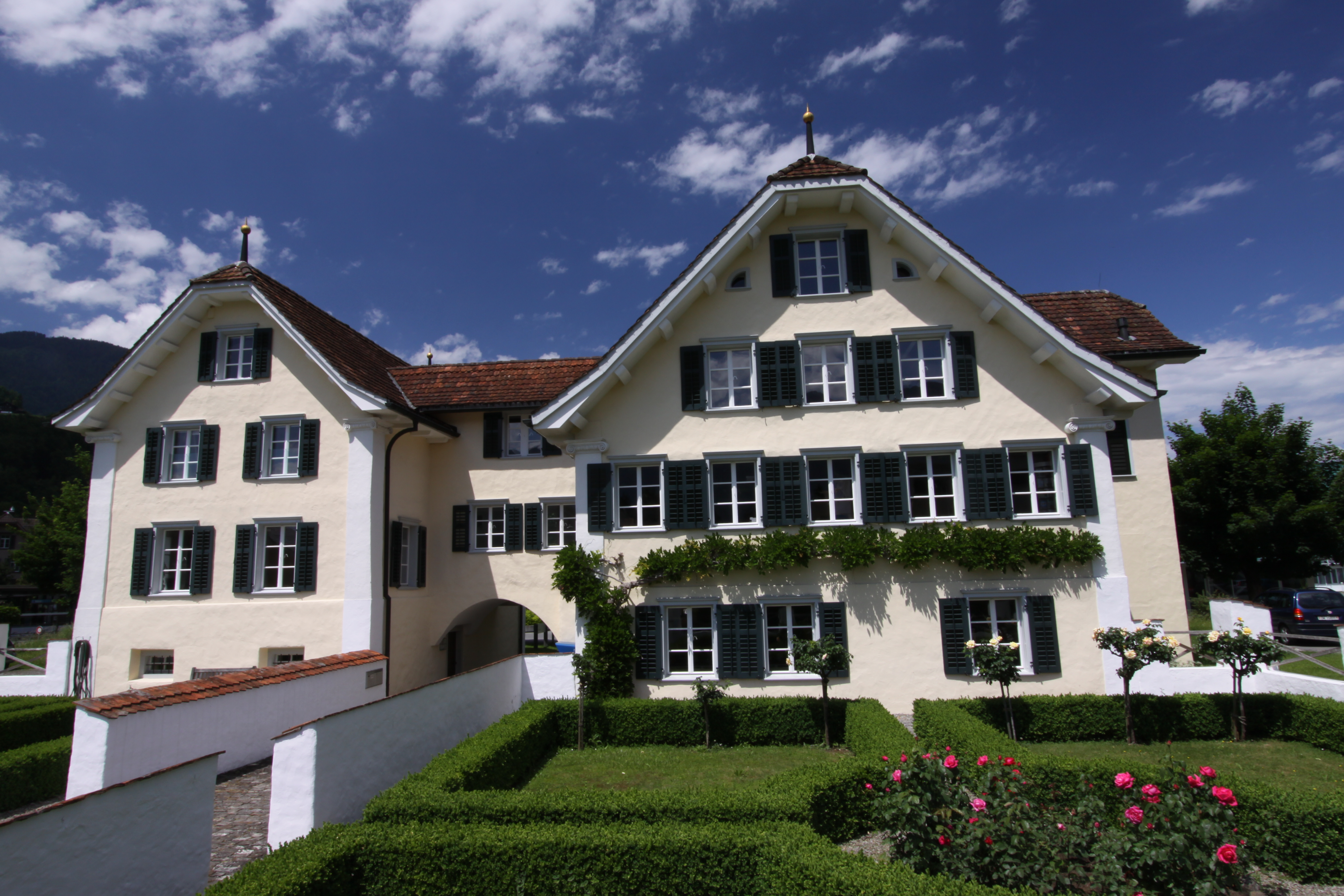
Double house Grundacher

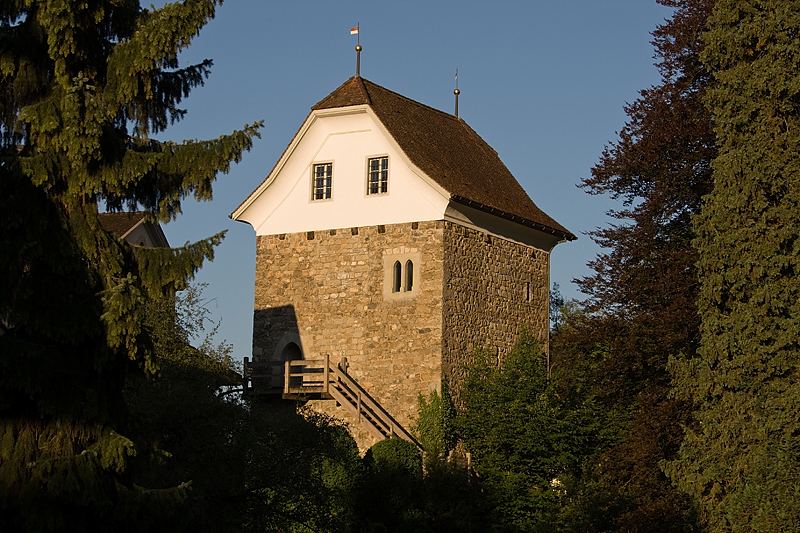
Hexenturm

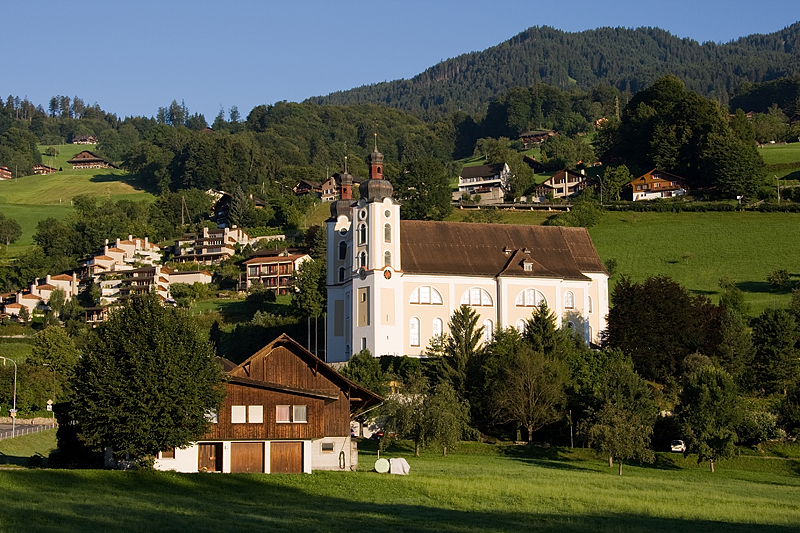
Catholic parish church of St. Peter and Paul

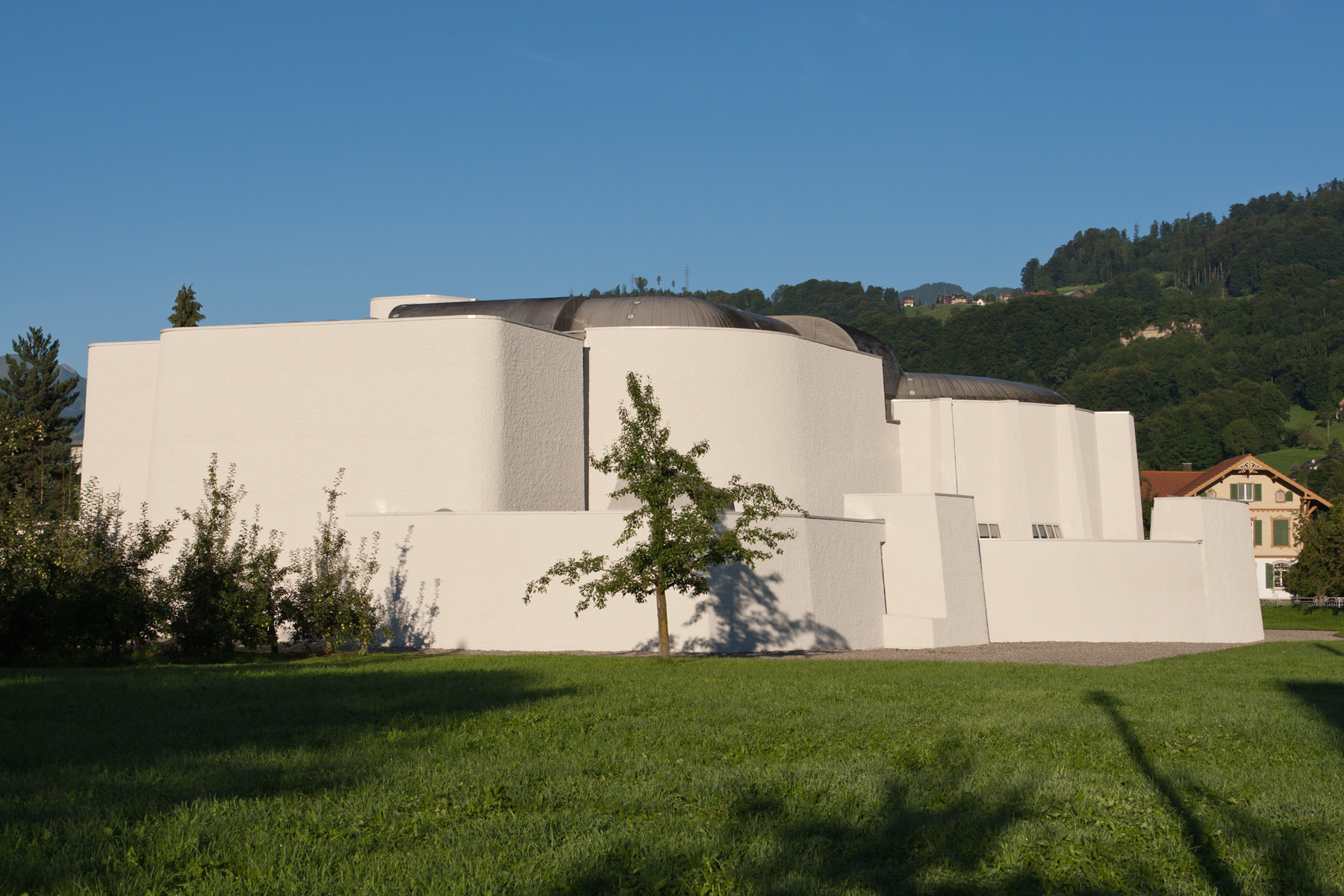
Kollegiumskirche of St. Martin

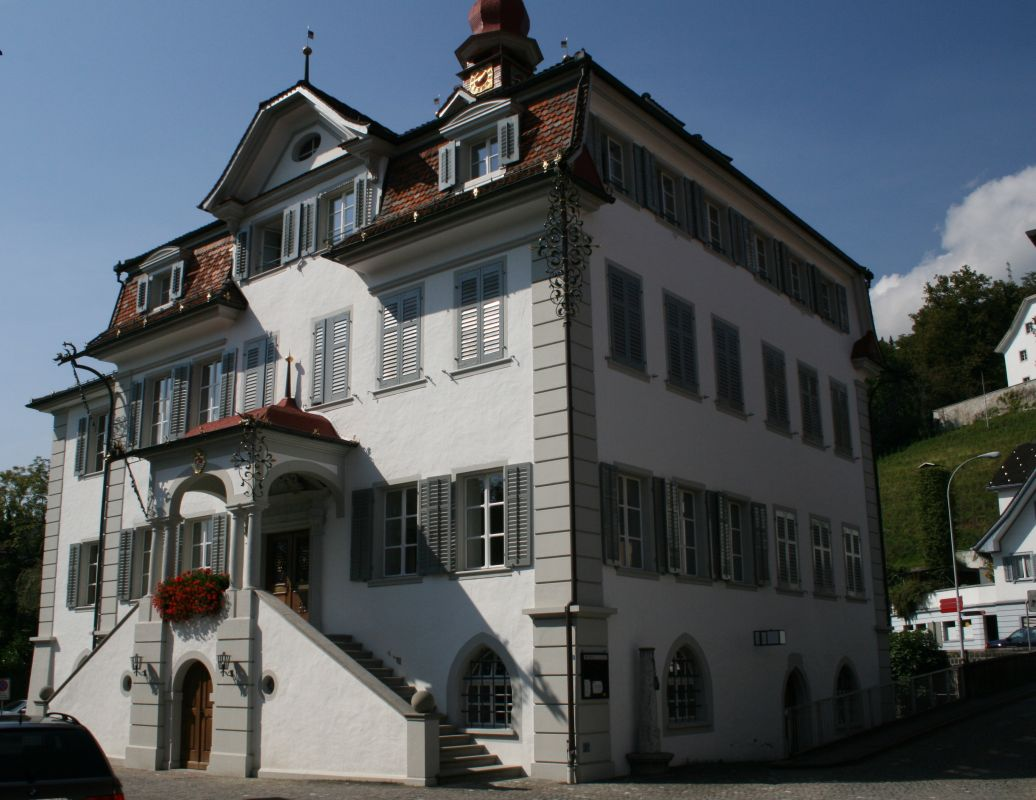
Rathaus of Obwalden

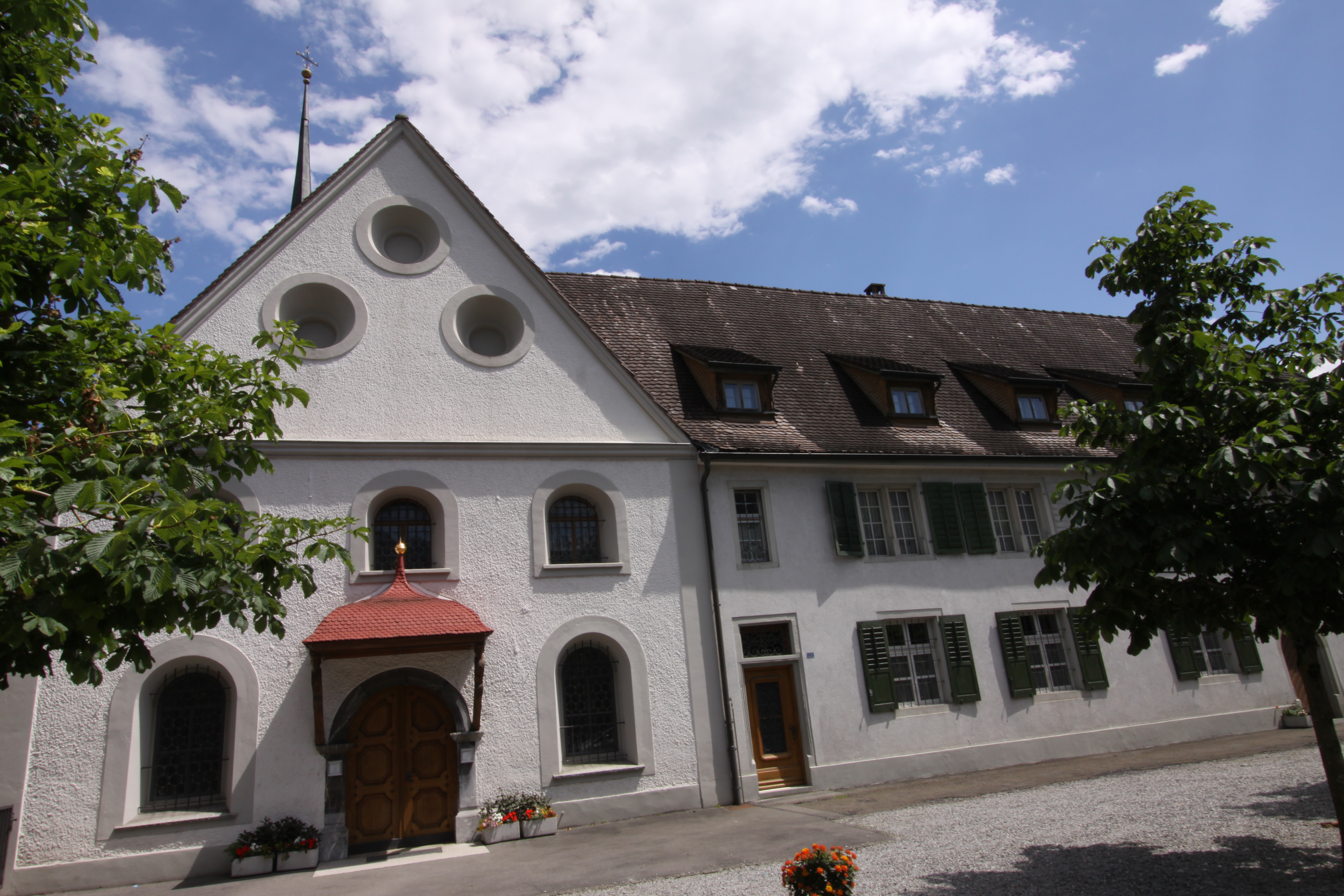
The Frauenkloster

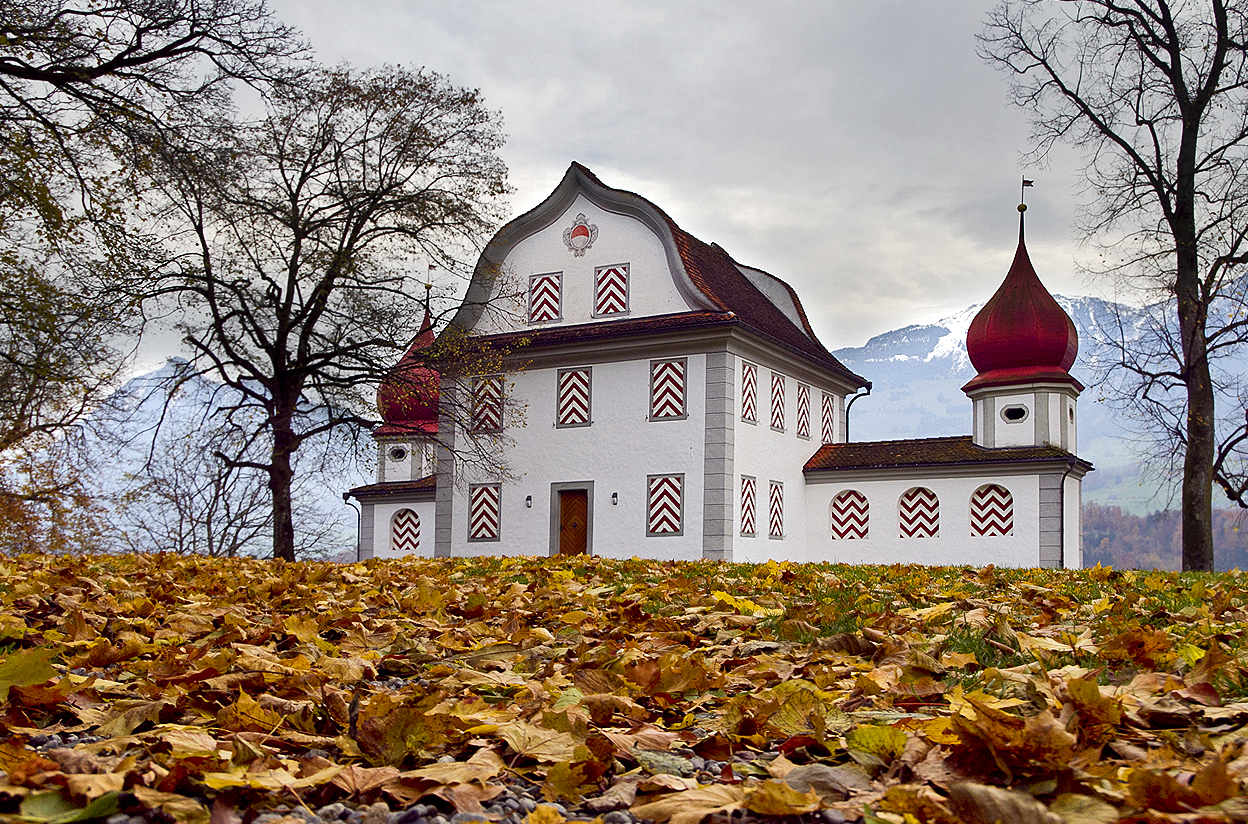
Landenberg Armory

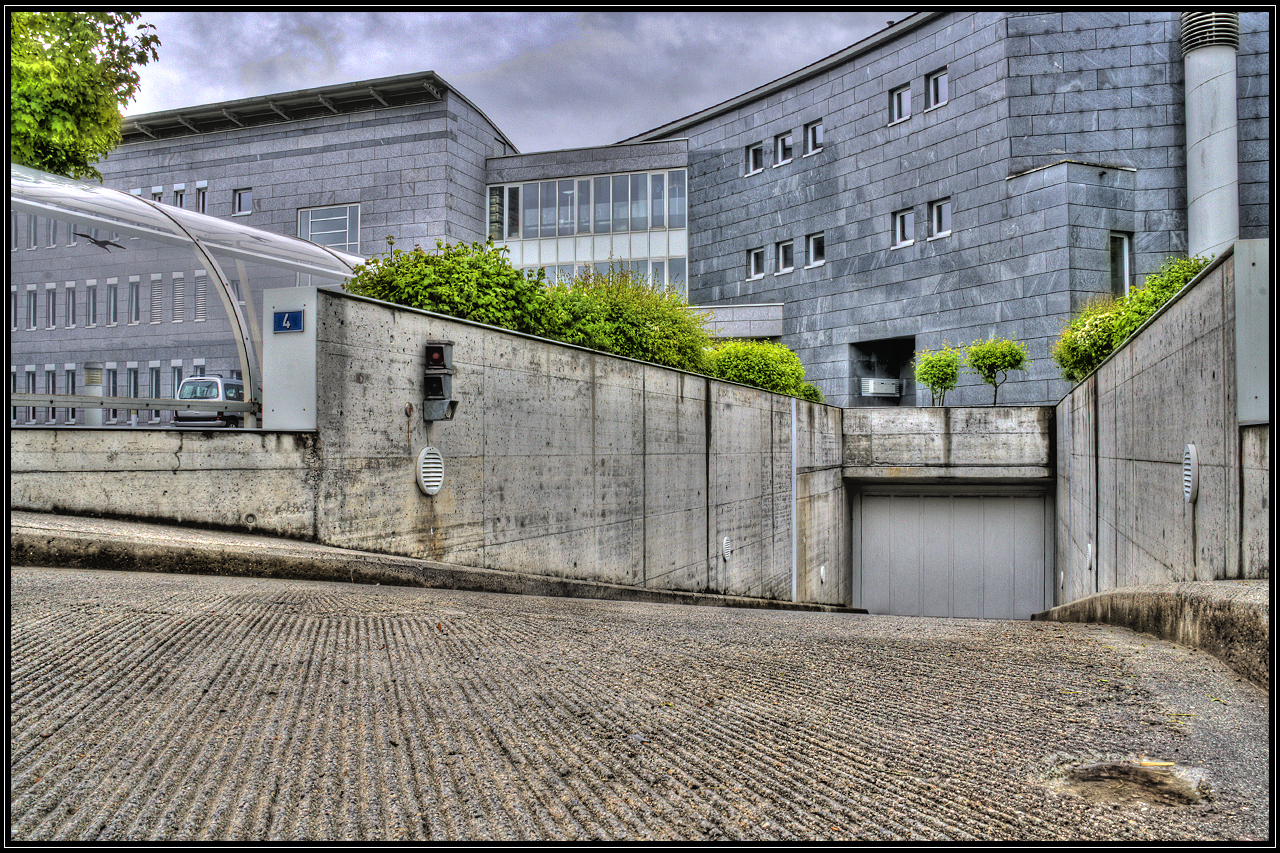
State Archives of Obwalden

== Sarnen today ==
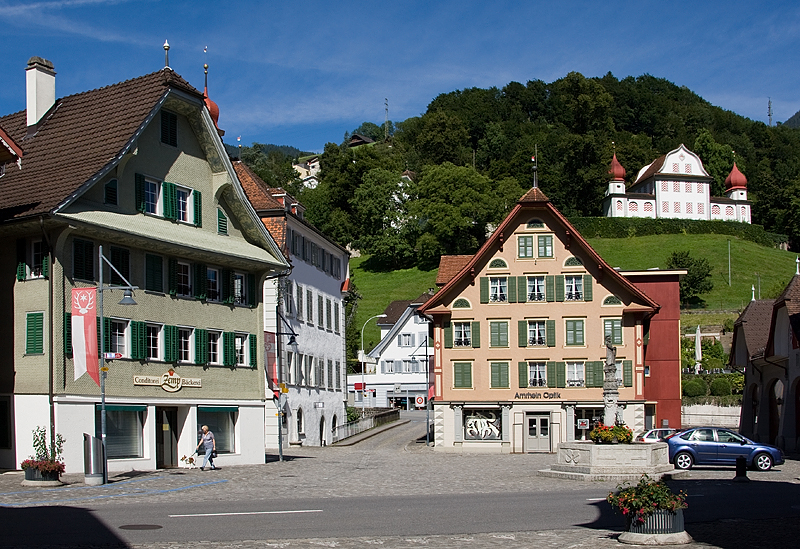
Dorfplatz

The town of Sarnen has been experiencing steady growth over the past years. It has become more attractive due to its proximity to Lucerne. Many commuters work in Lucerne and use the motorway or railway service to get to work.

Among companies active in Sarnen include SIKA AG (Specialty Chemicals), Leister Technologies (heated-air tools) and Nahrin AG (healthy nutrition).

== Economy ==
Sarnen is a small sized regional center.

As of 2014, there were a total of 8,182 people employed in the municipality. Of these, 366 people worked in 144 businesses in the primary economic sector. The secondary sector employed 2,058 workers in 151 separate businesses. In 2014 a total of 1,176 employees worked in 146 small companies (less than 50 employees). There were 4 mid sized businesses with 561 employees and 1 large business which employed 321 people. Finally, the tertiary sector provided 5,758 jobs in 987 businesses. There were 69 small businesses with a total of 1,746 employees, 10 mid sized businesses with a total of 963 employees and one large business with a total of 479 employees. In 2014 a total of 5.8% of the population received social assistance.

In 2015 local hotels had a total of 57,837 overnight stays, of which 34.3% were international visitors.

== Politics ==
In the 2015 federal election a small, local party received 65.6% of the vote, compared to 57.6% in 2011. The remainder of the vote (34.4%) went to the SVP, which received 42.4% in 2011. In the federal election, a total of 4,505 votes were cast, and the voter turnout was 61.0%.

In the 2007 federal election the most popular party was the CVP which received 34.8% of the vote. The next three most popular parties were the SVP (30%), the Other (22.7%) and the SPS (12.6%).

== Education ==
In Sarnen about 68.6% of the population (between age 25–64) have completed either non-mandatory upper secondary education or additional higher education (either university or a Fachhochschule).

== Religion ==
As of 2008, the religious membership of the municipality was; 7,403 or 74.7% are Roman Catholic, while 779 or 7.9% belonged to the Swiss Reformed Church. Of the rest of the population, there are 39 individuals (or about 0.39% of the population) who belong to the Christian Catholic faith. There are 1,687 individuals (or about 17.03% of the population) who belong to another church (not listed on the census) or no church.

== Transportation ==
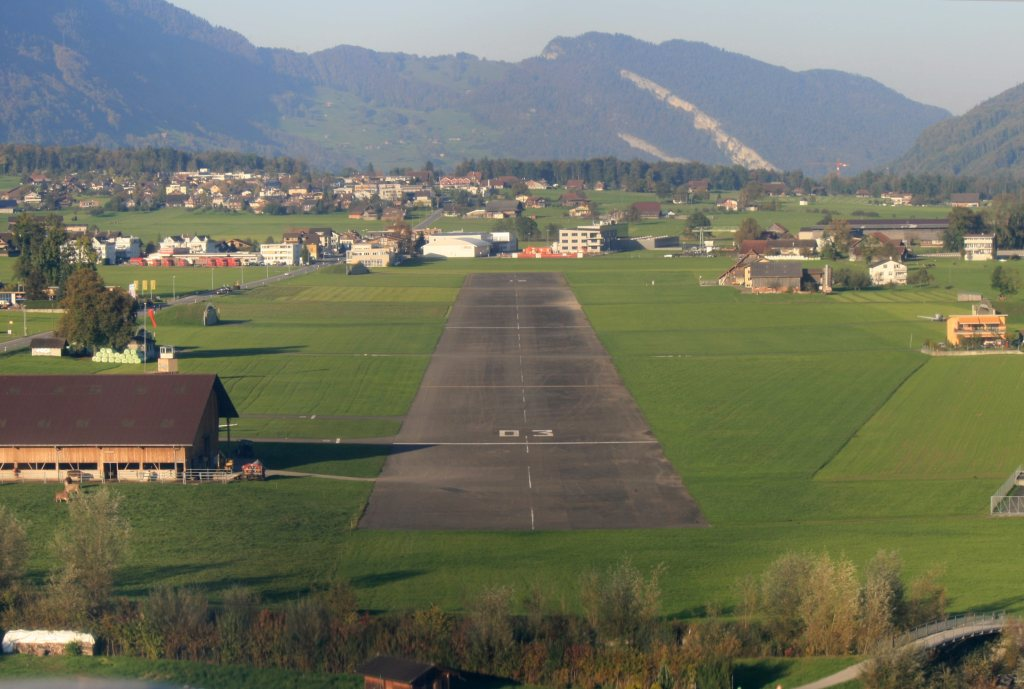
Kägiswil landing strip near Sarnen

=== Road ===
The highway A8 passes by Sarnen.

=== Railway ===
Sarnen is served by Sarnen station on the Brünig line, an inter-regional narrow-gauge railway from Interlaken to Lucerne. The hourly InterRegio train between Interlaken and Lucerne stops at the station, as does the half-hourly Lucerne S-Bahn S5 service between Giswil and Lucerne.

=== Airplane ===
Switzerland has three major international airports: Geneva, Zurich and Basel. Both Basel (at 125 km) and Zurich (90 km) airports are closer to Sarnen than Geneva airport (260 km). The journey from either airport by road takes from about 1 h to 1 hour 20 minutes.

Geneva and Zurich airports have built-in railway stations. The journey from Zurich takes between 1 h 30 min and 1 h 55 min depending on train connections.

== Weather ==
Sarnen has an average of 139.3 days of rain per year and on average receives 1,200 mm (47 in) of precipitation. The wettest month is August during which time Sarnen receives an average of 162 mm (6.4 in) of precipitation. During this month there is precipitation for an average of 13.6 days. The month with the most days of precipitation is June, with an average of 14.6, but with only 147 mm (5.8 in) of precipitation. The driest month of the year is January with an average of 66 mm (2.6 in) of precipitation over 13.6 days.

== Crime ==
In 2014 the crime rate, of the over 200 crimes listed in the Swiss Criminal Code (running from murder, robbery and assault to accepting bribes and election fraud), in Sarnen was 65.6 per thousand residents, which is very close to the national rate of 64.6. During the same period, the rate of drug crimes was 4.9 per thousand residents. This rate is about half the national rate. The rate of violations of immigration, visa and work permit laws was 1.0 per thousand residents, or about 20.4% of the national rate.

== Notable people ==
- Nicholas of Flüe (1598 – 1649), theologian and abbot of Wettingen
- Herman Fanger (1895 in Sarnen – 1971) a Swiss-born American inventor of the coaxial speaker
- Hans Vollenweider (1908 – 1940 in Sarnen) a Swiss criminal, the last person to be sentenced to death by a civilian court in Switzerland, executed shortly after
- Franz Bucher (born 1940 in Sarnen) a Swiss artist, produces paintings, drawings, woodcuts, etchings, sculptural objects, reliefs, murals and stained glass
- Daniel Vacek (born 1971) a former tennis player from Czechoslovakia, represented his country at the 1996 Summer Olympics, lives in Sarnen
- Jonas Omlin (born 1994 in Sarnen) a Swiss football goalkeeper, about 60 club caps
- Viola Calligaris (born 1996 in Sarnen) a Swiss footballer who plays as a midfielder
