= Landenberg Castle =

- Burgruine Landenberg
- Sarnen, Obwalden in Switzerland
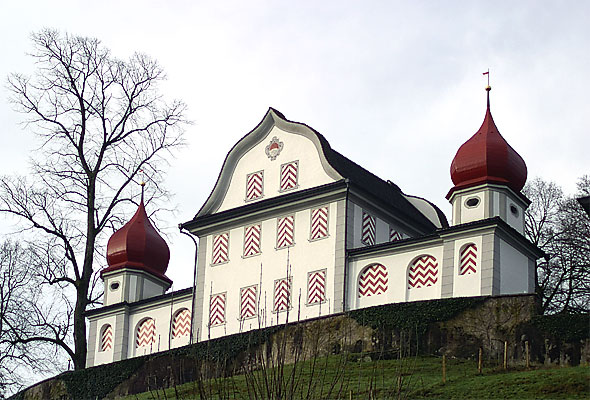
- The 1752 Schützenhaus on Landenberg

Site information
- Condition: ruined

Location
- Coordinates: 46°53′48.16″N 8°14′37.94″E

Site history
- Built: 11th century

Landenberg Castle is a ruined castle atop a hill in the municipality of Sarnen in the canton of Obwalden in Switzerland. In the 18th century an armory and firing range were built on the site. The Landenberg Armory is a Swiss heritage site of national significance. The ruins of the castle was the meeting place of the Landsgemeinde or Cantonal assembly for over three centuries.

== History ==
The castle was originally known as Sarnen Castle or simply Sarnen. Landenberg first appears in records in the 17th century.

The earliest fortifications on Landenberg hill probably date back to the early 11th century, when the Counts of Lenzburg built a wooden fort there. After the Lenzburg line died out in 1173 their estates around Sarnen were inherited by the Habsburgs. The Habsburgs built a stone ring wall around much of the crown of the hill. While parts of the wall are still visible, very little is known about the buildings inside the wall. The castle was one of the largest castles in central Switzerland. However, in the early 13th century, the castle was apparently abandoned, for unknown reasons. It is unclear whether the Hexenturm, built in the late 13th century, was part of the Landenberg complex, a replacement to it or simply a nearby castle.

The 15th century White Book of Sarnen contains a story about how in the early 14th century local Swiss patriots stormed a castle and burned it on Christmas Eve while the pro-Habsburg nobleman was attending Mass. Traditionally it was believed that the attack happened to Landenberg Castle, though more recent research indicates that it may have been the Hexenturm.

After the castle was abandoned, the walls were slowly broken up for building material and animals were penned inside. In the early 17th century a drawing of the ruins show that the castle walls still stood. At that time it was owned by Hauptmann Marquard Seiler/Seier. After his death, his widow sold the castle and hill to the Canton of Obwalden. The first armory was built there around 1620 on the site of a medieval tower. In 1646 it was decided that the Landsgemeinde, a yearly assembly of all voters in the Canton, would meet in the Landenberg. To hold these assemblies, the ground was cleared and the walls repaired. It continued to meet at Landenberg until it was dissolved in 1998. During construction of the armory and shooting range, many of the remaining castle walls were demolished or buried. During an 1895 renovation of the Landsgemeinde plaza, the old walls were excavated and repaired.

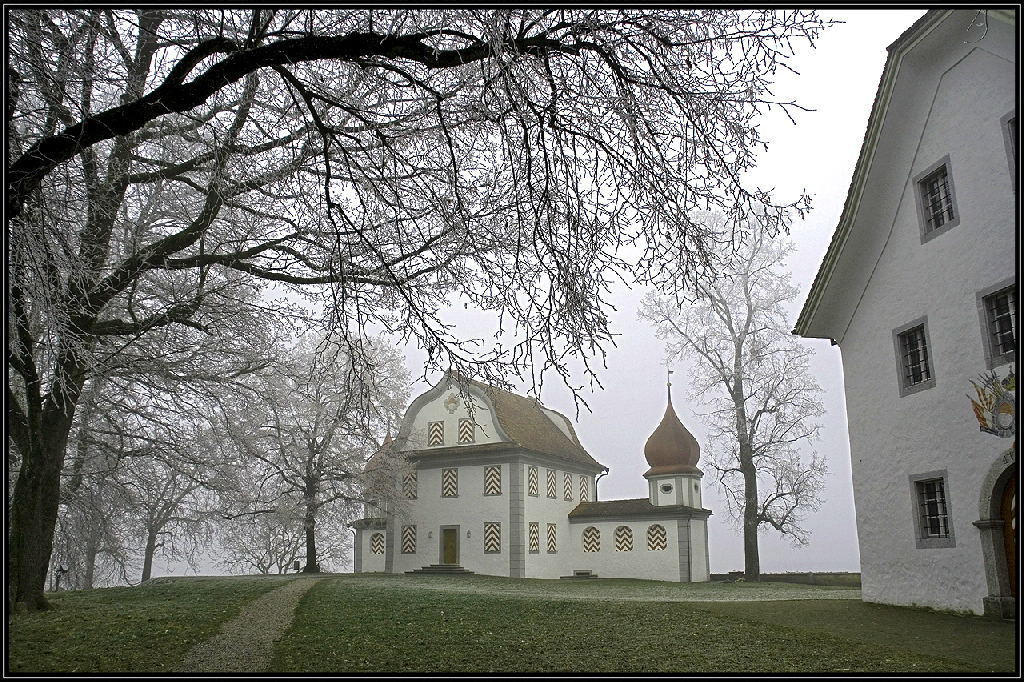
The shooting range and armory buildings

The current armory building was built in 1711 and required demolishing a medieval tower on the south-west corner to open up space. The Baroque building was built by Hans Josef von Flüe. The cannons were stored in the large, open ground floor, while the upper floors stored small arms and armor. The armory was used for its military purpose until 1975. Today it is one of the few intact armories in central Switzerland.

A shooting range was built on the hill top in the early 18th century, but was destroyed in a fire in 1747. The current shooting range building was built in 1752 by Johann Anton Singer. The 1752 building has a large three story center with symmetric single story wings each topped with an onion dome capped tower. The upper story of the central features a richly decorated large ball room or meeting hall.

== Castle site ==
The ruins of the castle walls cover an area of about 40 by 90 meters (130 ft × 300 ft), making it one of the largest castles in central Switzerland. Today long stretches of low stone walls are still visible. The walls are up to 1.36 m (4.5 ft) thick. The gate house is on the western wall, but that section of the wall was totally demolished so nothing is known about the gate. The western corner was the highest part of the hill and was guarded by a 10.5 m (34 ft) square tower.

The Zeughaus or armory is on the southern side of the complex, while the Schützenhaus or shooting range building is on the eastern side.

== See also ==
List of castles and fortresses in Switzerland
