= Hexenturm (Sarnen) =

- Sarnen, Obwalden in Switzerland
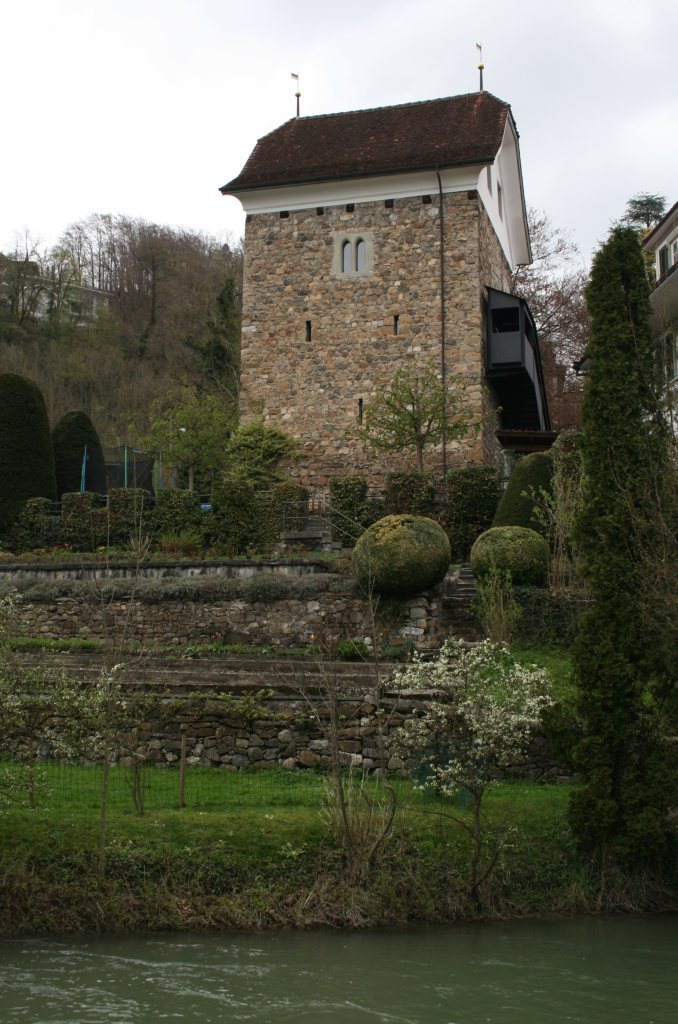

Location
- Coordinates: 46.895683°N 8.243706°E

Site history
- Built: 1285/86
- Built by: Niklaus and Heinrich Kellner

The Hexenturm is a stone tower in the municipality of Sarnen in the canton of Obwalden in Switzerland. It is a Swiss heritage site of national significance. The name ("witch tower") refers to its use as a prison for suspected witches in the 17th century. Today it houses the Cantonal Archives of Obwalden.

== History ==
The tower was built around 1285/86 (determined by Dendrochronological dating) as the residence tower of larger castle complex, the Unteren Burg von Sarnen or Lower Sarnen Castle. The castle was built for the von Kellner family who were knights in service to the Murbach Abbey. The first member of the family to appear in records is the cellarius Heinrich at the monastery in 1229. The family name may be a form of the title and office that he held. The sons of Heinrich and his brothers were the knights Niklaus and Heinrich Kellner who built the castle. Niklaus probably lived in Sarnen, while his brother lived in Lucerne. In 1291 the Habsburgs bought the town of Lucerne and the Unterwalden estates, including the castle and surrounding farms, from Murbach Abbey. The Kellner family became vassals of the Habsburg-Laufenburg line. When the Everlasting League was created on 1 August 1291, the Kellners found themselves at odds with their neighbors and by 1308 they had been driven out. The last Kellner, Heinrich, died in 1348.

After the Kellners were forced out, the Landenburg family occupied the castle. The 15th century White Book of Sarnen contains a story about how in the early 14th century local Swiss patriots stormed a castle and burned it on Christmas Eve while the pro-Habsburg nobleman was attending Mass. Traditionally it was believed that the attack happened to nearby Landenberg Castle, though more recent research indicates that it may have been the Hexenturm.

By the 15th century, the tower was a prison for the Canton of Obwalden. In the 16th century it was repaired and occasionally used to store powder and records. During the 17th century witch-hunts the tower was used to hold accused witches, leading to the name. At some time before 1798 the prison cell at the top of the tower was demolished. The fortifications around the tower gradually fell into disrepair and in the 19th century were demolished and replaced with terraces. In 1877 it was supposed to become a museum. A new entrance was built and some of the old windows were bricked up, but the museum never opened. Today the cantonal archives are stored in the tower.

== See also ==
List of castles and fortresses in Switzerland
