= Witch tower =

Tower that was part of a medieval town wall or castle

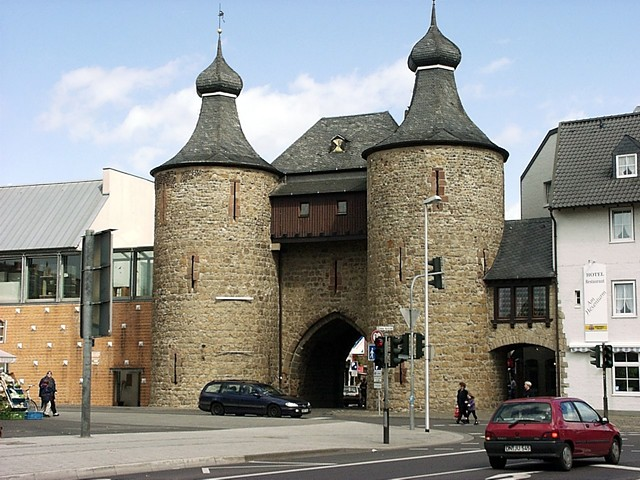
The Jülich witch tower

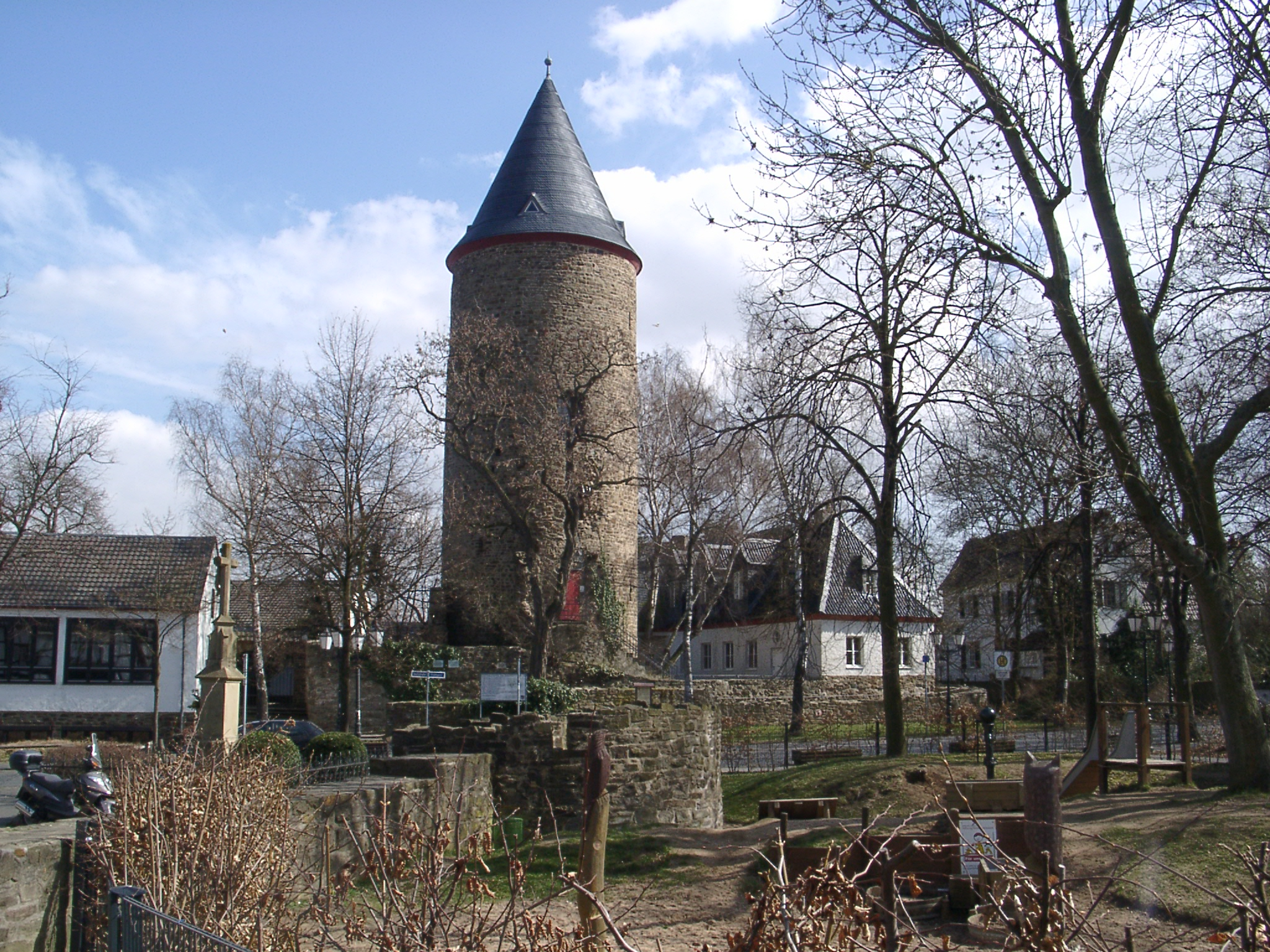
The Witch Tower in Rheinbach

Witch tower or Witches' Tower (German: Hexenturm) is a common name or description in English and other European languages for a tower that was part of a medieval town wall or castle, often used as a prison or dungeon.

== History ==
The name is derived from the period of witch trials. Many of these towers were used to incarcerate those suspected or found guilty of witchcraft.

Other witch towers were named later, for example in the 19th century when they were used as prisons or ordinary towers in the city walls.

Witch towers are found in many German towns and cities such as Aschersleben, Coburg, Frankenberg (Eder), Fulda, Gelnhausen, Geseke, Heidelberg, Herborn, Hofheim am Taunus, Idstein, Jülich, Kaufbeuren, Lahnstein, Landsberg am Lech, Marburg, Markdorf, Memmingen, Olpe, Rheinbach, Rüthen, Treysa, Windecken. Today these towers are sometimes renovated and used to house museums.

According to legend, witches were burnt at the stake at the Witches' Tower at the Wildensteiner Burg. With trials from the region of the Upper Danube valley may be seen in the archives.

In Babenhausen, a special beer, the Hexe ("Witch") is brewed which depicts on its label the local witch tower.

In Salzburg there is a witch tower in the city walls dating to the 15th century that was used as a prison and, later, as a store. In 1944 it was destroyed by a bomb and the ruins were torn down. Only a picture on the facade of Wolf Dietrich Straße and Paris Lodron Straße recalls this building.

== Surviving examples ==
- Großes Bollwerk and Hexenturm (Büdingen)
- Hexenturm (Burg)
- Hexenturm (Calbe)
- Hexenturm (Fulda)
- Hexenturm in the Old Gaol at Freising
- Hexenturm (Gelnhausen)
- Hexenturm (Herborn)
- Hexenturm (Hofheim am Taunus)
- Hexenturm (Idstein), part of Idstein Castle
- Hexenturm Jülich
- Hexenturm (Memmingen)
- Hexenturm (Oberderdingen)
- Hexenturm (Rüthen)
- Hexenturm (Sarnen)
- Hexenturm (Stein am Rhein)
- Baszta Czarownic (Słupsk)

== Lost witch towers ==
- Hexenturm (Munich), a tower in Munich's second city wall.
- Hexenturm (Salzburg), tower in the former city wall, today on the corner of Paris-Lodron-Straße and Wolf-Dietrich Straße.

== Gallery ==
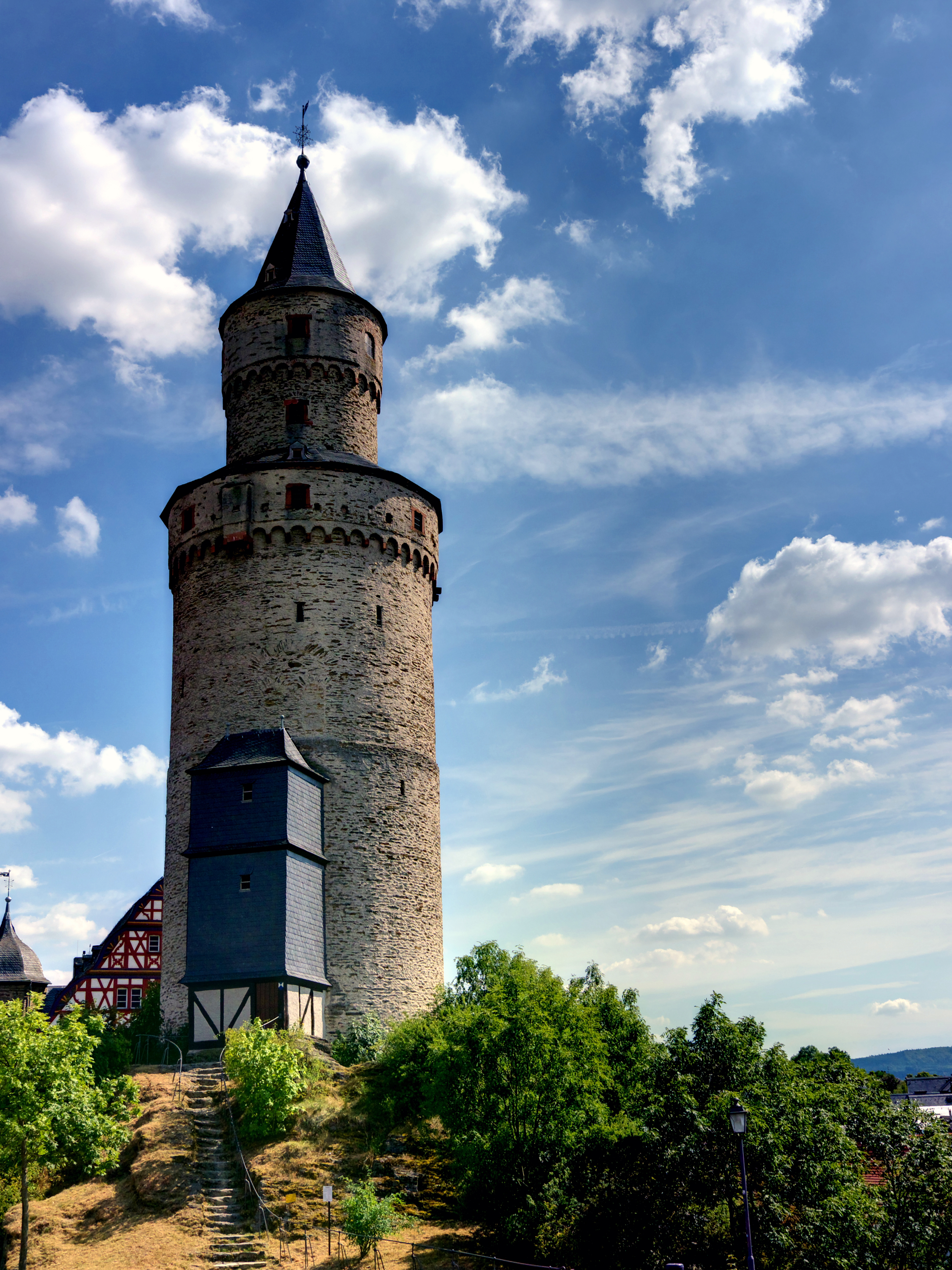
The Hexenturm in Idstein

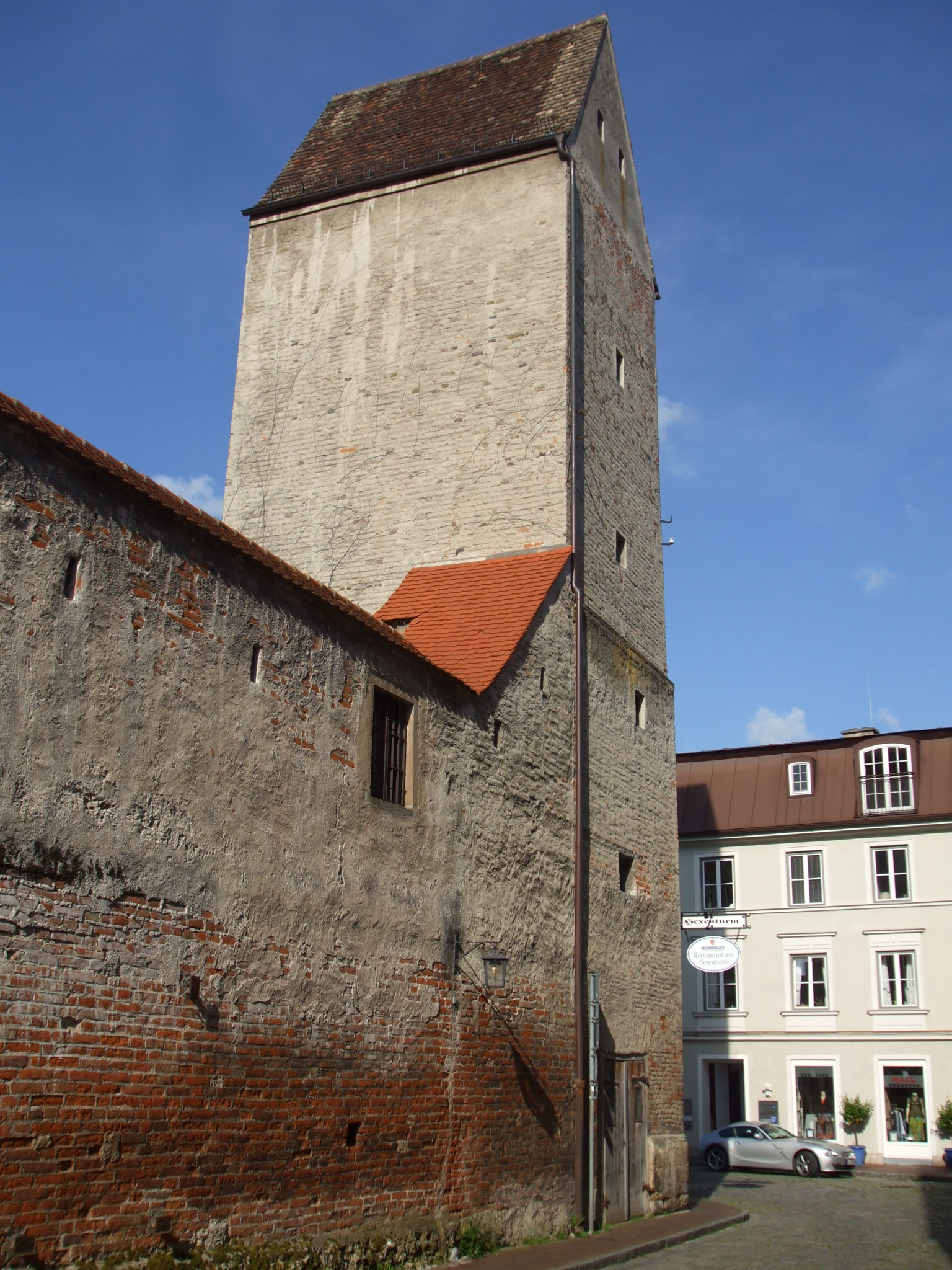
Witch tower in Landsberg am Lech

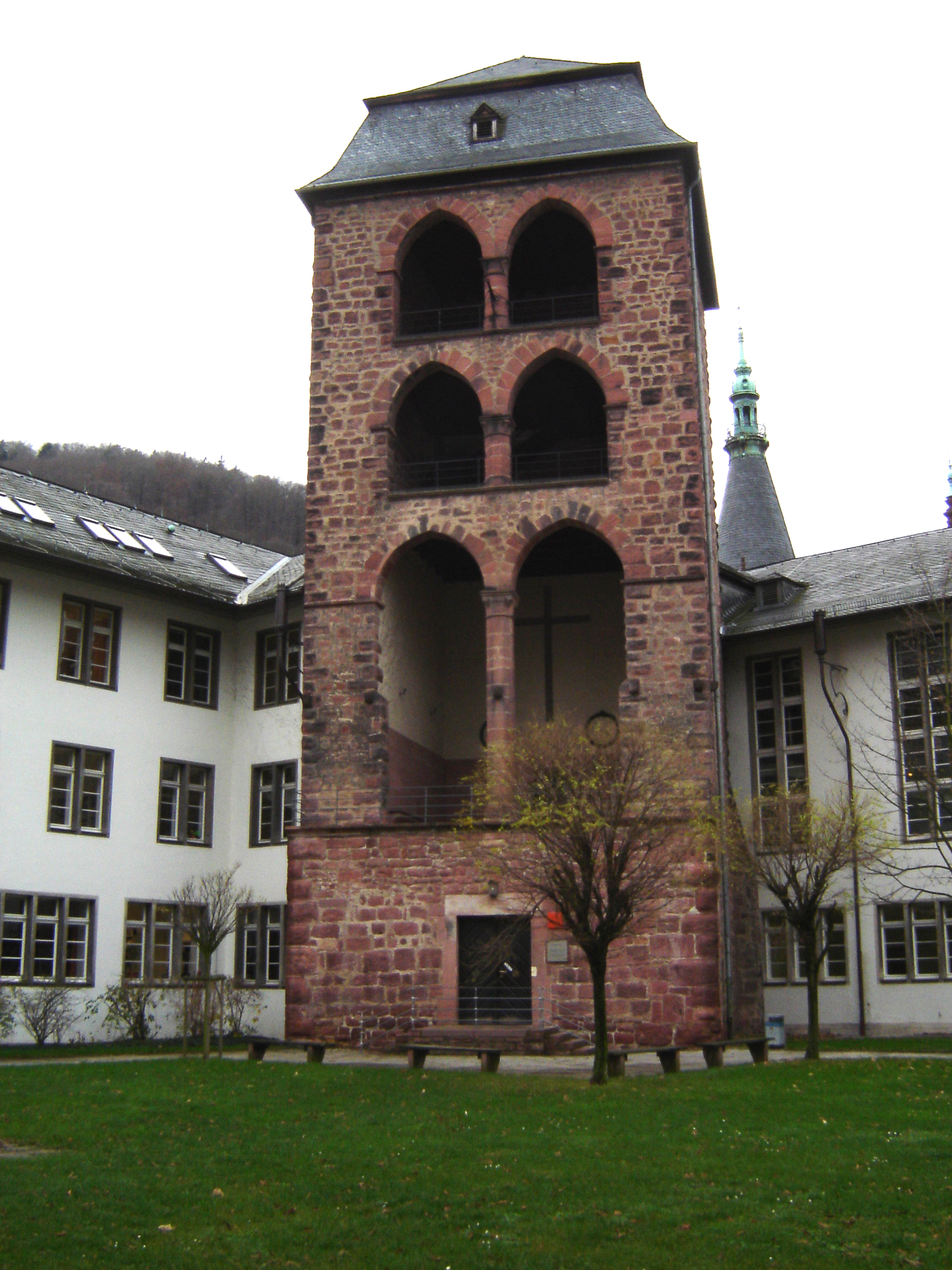
The Witch Tower, surrounded today by the inner courtyard of the New University, is the only remnant of the medieval town fortifications in Heidelberg

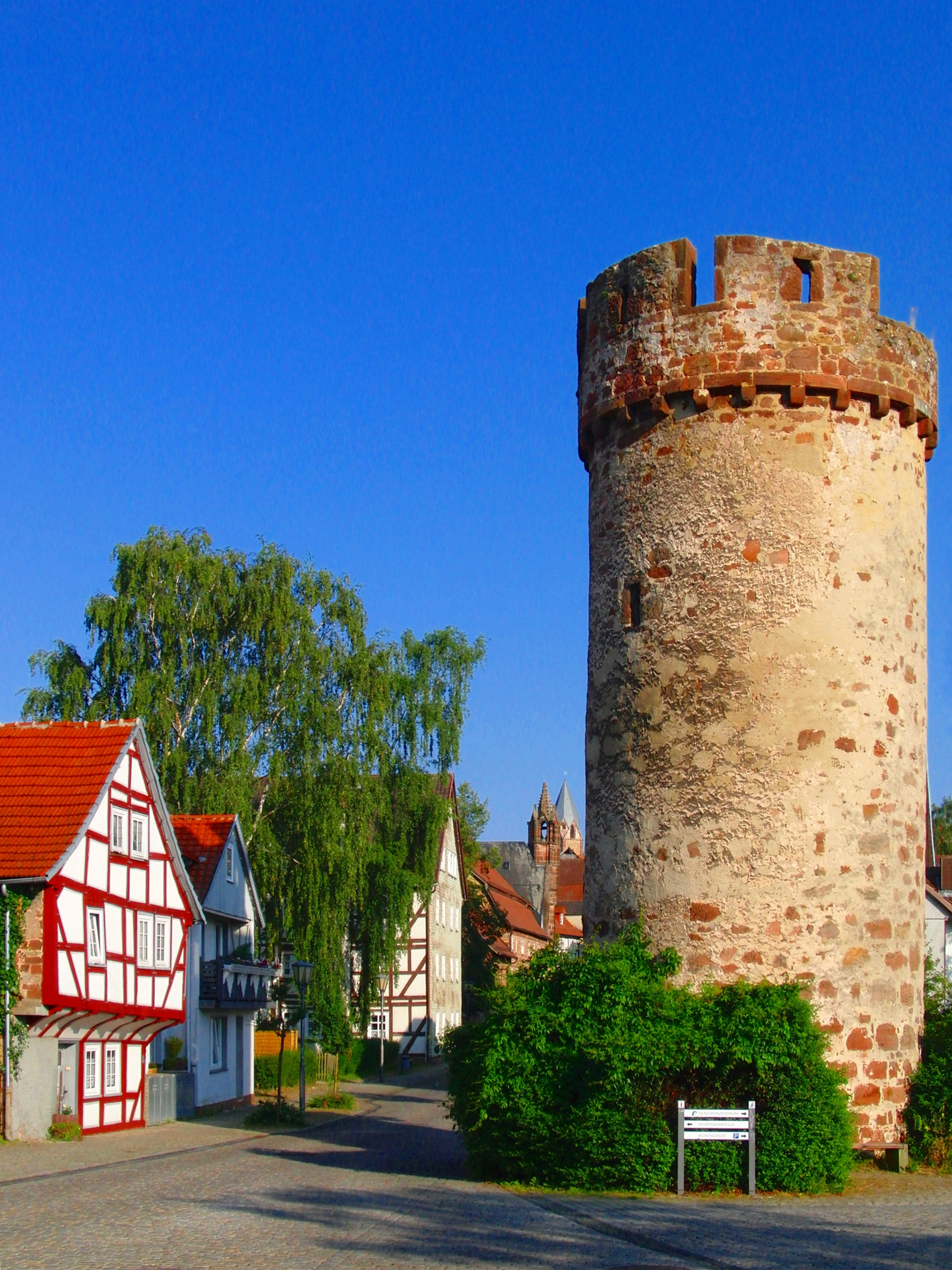
Witch tower in Treysa

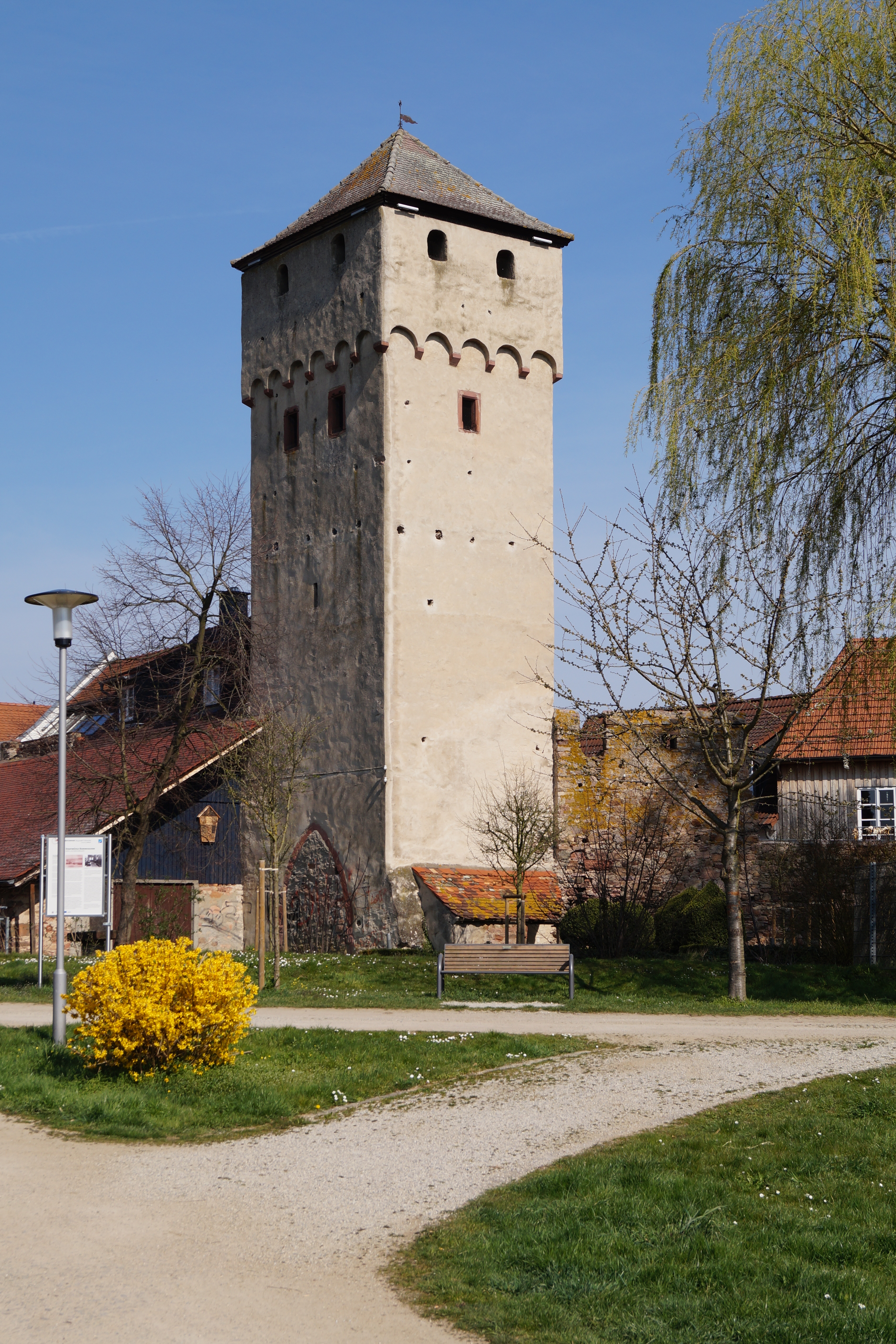
Witch tower in Babenhausen (Hesse)
