= Ruchstock =

Mountain in Switzerland

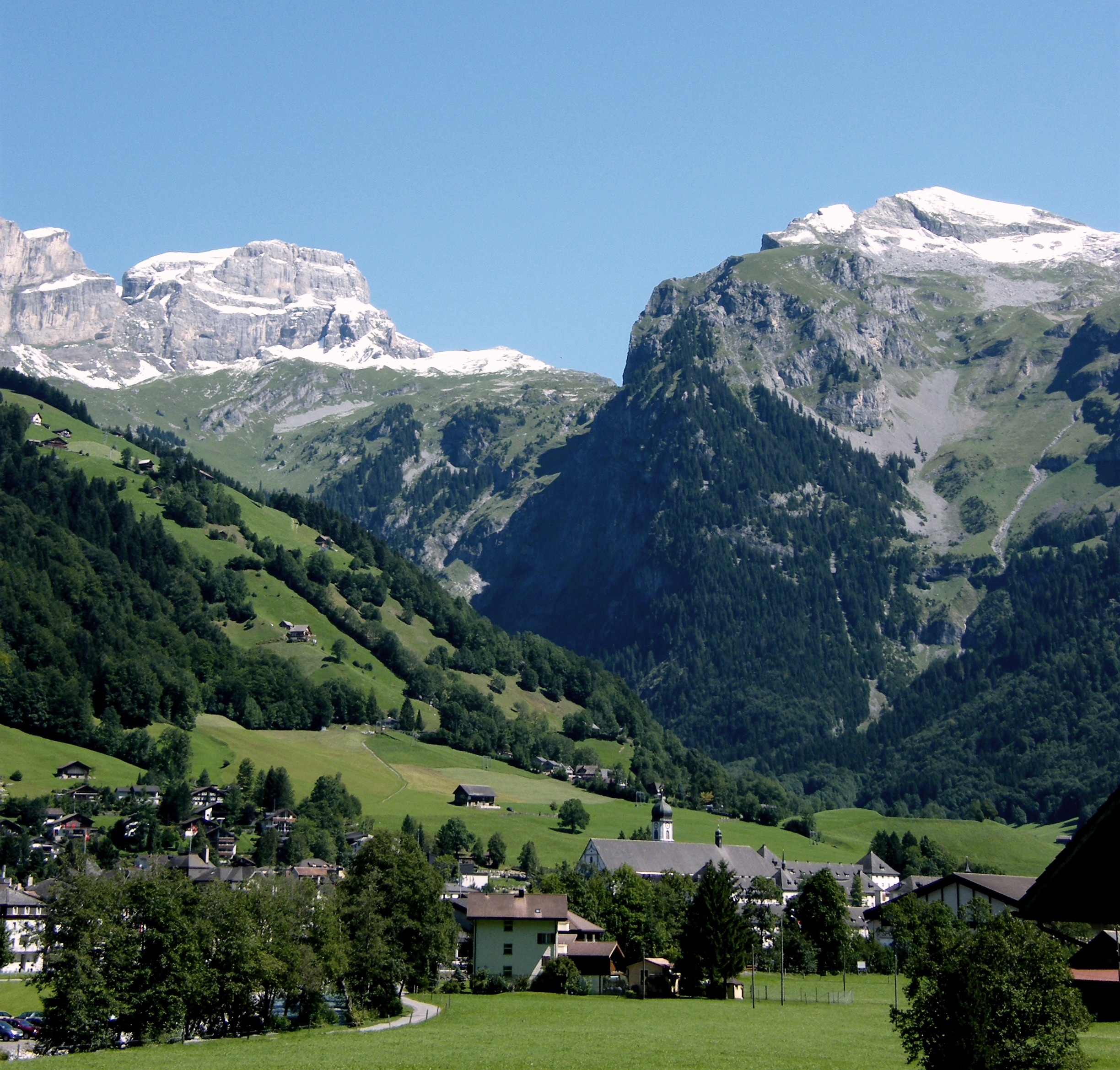
- The Ruchstock (left) from Engelberg

Highest point
- Elevation: 2,813 m (9,229 ft)
- Prominence: 255 m (837 ft)
- Parent peak: Wissigstock
- Coordinates: 46°51′23.9″N 8°28′13.7″E

Geography
- Location within Switzerland
- Location: Nidwalden/Uri, Switzerland
- Parent range: Urner Alps

The Ruchstock is a mountain of the Urner Alps in Central Switzerland.

== Geography ==
It is located between the Engelberg valley and the valley of the Reuss river and reaches an altitude of 2813 m. The mountain lies on the border of the cantons of Nidwalden and Uri, while the border to the canton of Obwalden runs only about 100m south of the peak, making it the third canton that has a part of the massif. The Ruchstock constitutes the highest point on the ridge that connects the Walenstöcke and the Rigidalstock in the west of it to the Oberberg and Hasenstock to the east. To the northwest, it thrones high above Bannalpsee and the small municipality of Oberrickenbach, to the north it faces Brisen and located to the northeast is the Isental valley. To the east and southeast it faces the higher peaks of Engelberger Rotstock and Wissigstock, to the south lie the Rugghubel alp, the Hahnen and, on the other side of the valley the region's highest peak, Titlis. Located to the southwest, about 6 km away and 1800m below, is the village of Engelberg, which is the closest major settlement. Despite its altitude, the mountain is not visible from much of the surrounding valleyground, as neighbouring mountain ranges reach similar altitude and thus obstruct view. On its northeastern slope, there is a small icefield named Schlittchuechen.

== Ascent ==
Although there is a lot of touristic infrastructure and a dense network of hiking paths in the Engelberg area, there is neither on the mountain itself. The Ruckstock is occasionally climbed by experienced hikers and is rated T6 (difficult alpine hiking) on the hiking scale of the Swiss Alpine Club (SAC) or WS (moderately difficult) on its mountaineering scale, respectively. There is at hut named Rugghubelhütte located around 1 km to the south, though the peak is mostly accessed from the north.
