= Bannalp =

Mountain region in Nidwalden, Switzerland

Coordinates: 46.8692°N 8.438°E

Bannalp is a mountain region in the Swiss canton of Nidwalden, near Engelberg. In the Bannalp region there are three alpine huts and a small lake, Bannalpsee. There is a cable car from Oberrickenbach, near Wolfenschiessen, to Bannalp. It has a small and family friendly ski resort.
