= Engelberg =

- Municipality
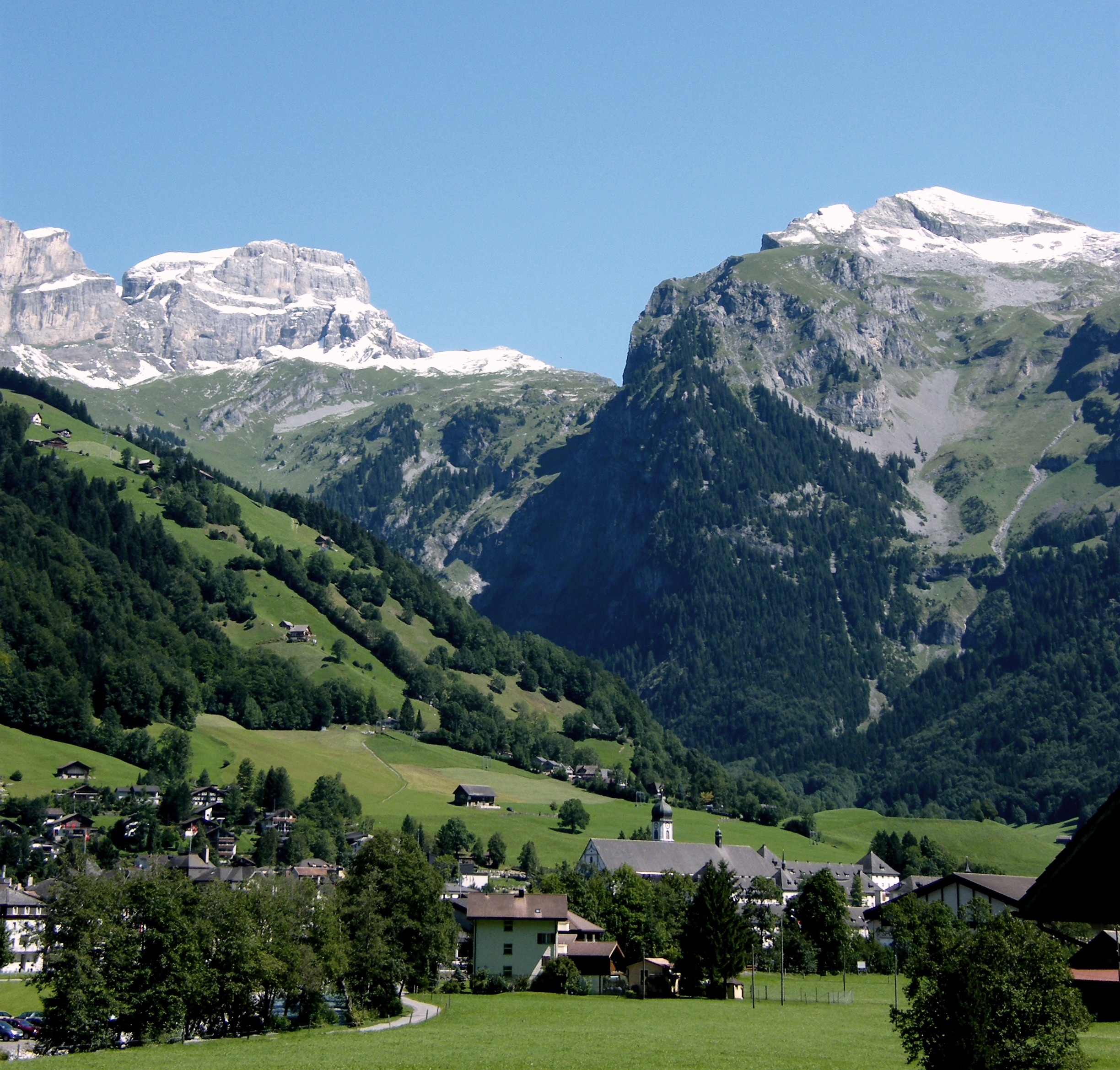
- View from Engelberg towards northeast with the snow covered Lauchernstock and the Ruchstock to the left, and the Gross Gemsispil to the right (mid-August 2007)

- Flag Coat of arms
- Location of Engelberg
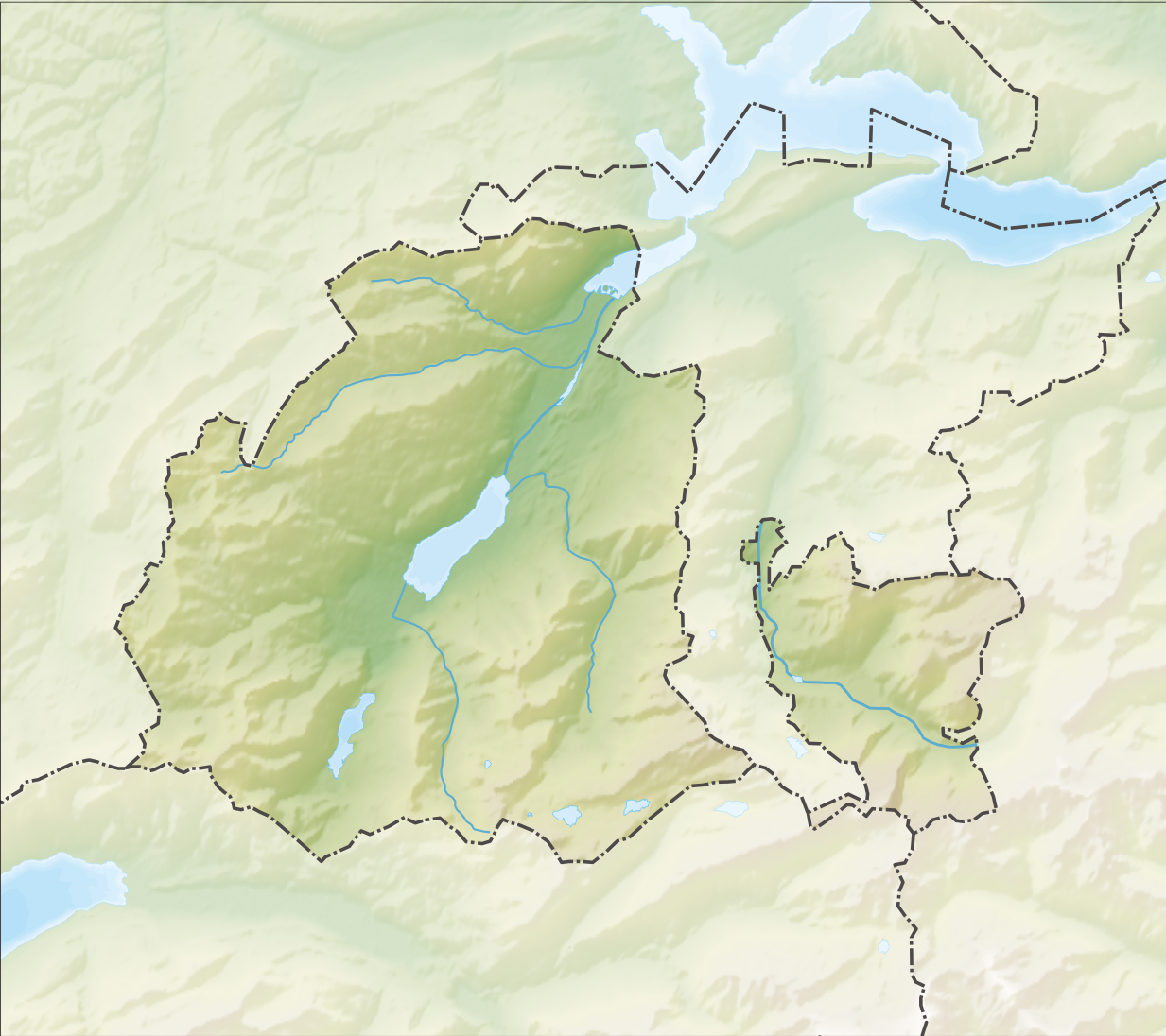
- Location within Switzerland Location within Canton of Obwalden
- Coordinates: 46°49′15.7″N 8°24′32.3″E
- Country: Switzerland
- Canton: Obwalden
- District: n.a.

Government
  - Executive: Gemeinderat with 5-7 members
  - Mayor: Talammann; Alex Höchli CVP/PDC (as of July 2016)
  - Parliament: none (Talgemeinde)

Area
  - Total: 74.87 km^{2} (28.91 sq mi)
- Elevation (The monastery's church): 1,013 m (3,323 ft)
- Highest elevation (Mount Titlis): 3,238 m (10,623 ft)
- Lowest elevation (Engelberger Aa in Grafenort): 556 m (1,824 ft)

Population (December 2020)
  - Total: 4,194
  - Density: 56.02/km^{2} (145.1/sq mi)
- Demonym: German: Engelberger(in)
- Time zone: UTC+01:00 (CET)
  - Summer (DST): UTC+02:00 (CEST)
- Postal codes: 6390 Engelberg, 6388 Grafenort
- SFOS number: 1402
- ISO 3166 code: CH-OW
- Localities: Grafenort, Oberberg, Neuschwändi, Niederberg, Mühlebrunnen, Schwand, Obermatt, Gerschni, Horbis, Brunni, Herrenrüti, Fürenalp, Griessental
- Surrounded by: Attinghausen (UR), Gadmen (BE), Innertkirchen (BE), Isenthal (UR), Wassen (UR), Wolfenschiessen (NW)
- Website: gde-engelberg.ch

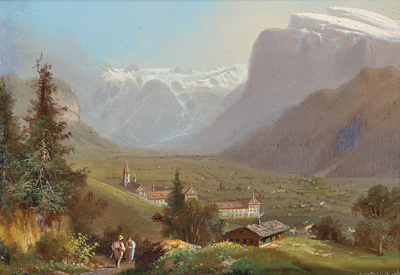
Hubert Sattler (1817–1904): View of Engelberg

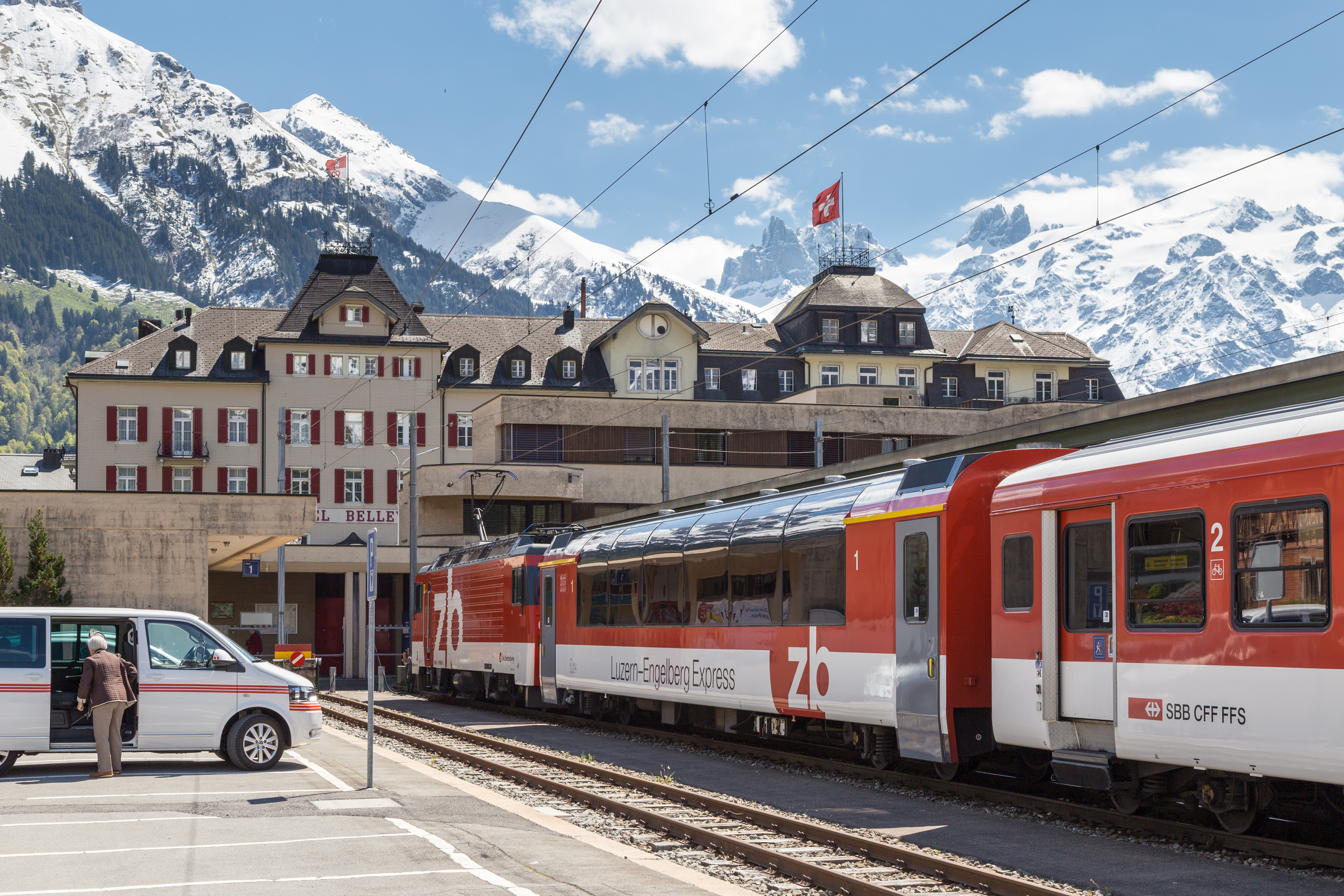
Engelberg station

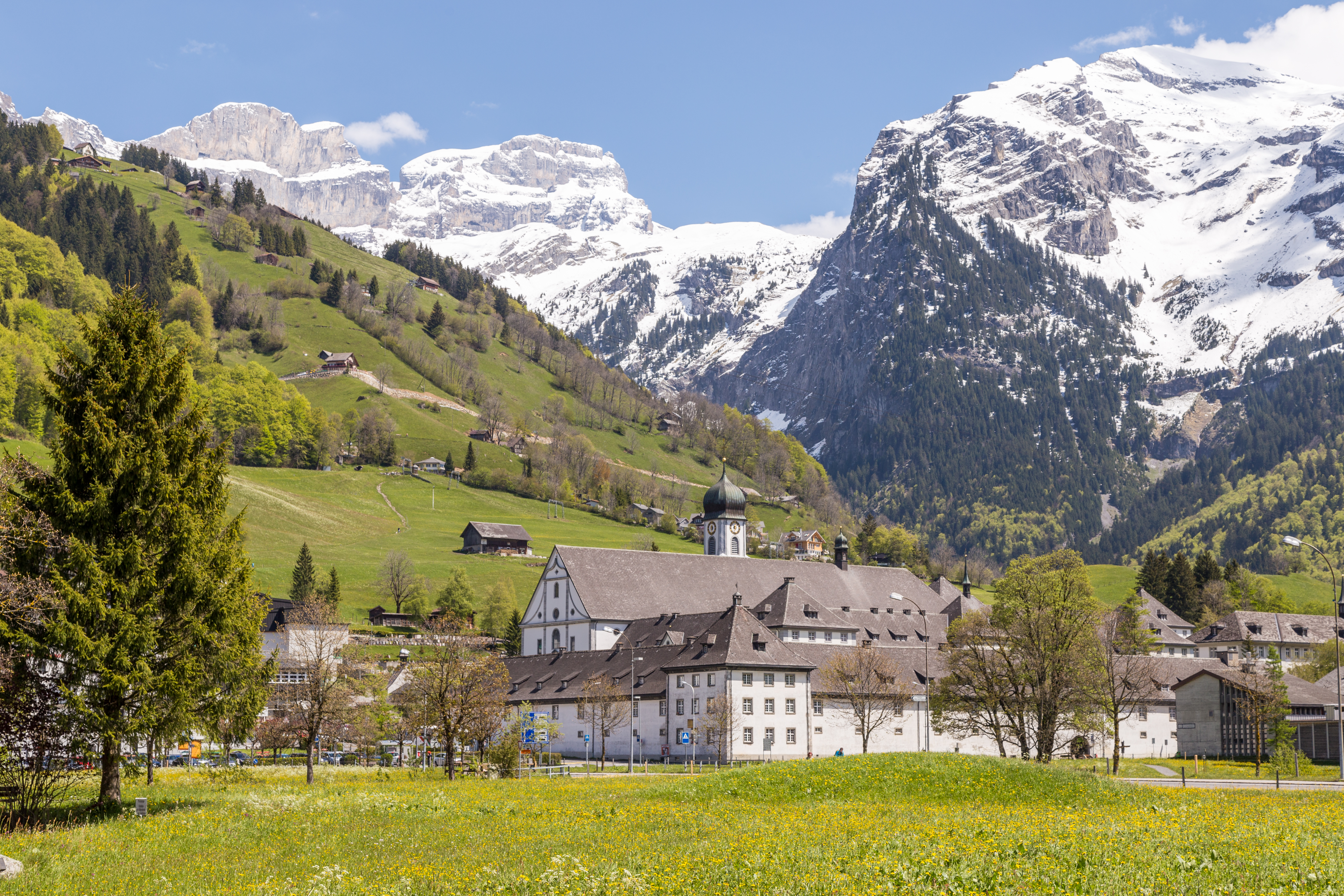
Engelberg Abbey

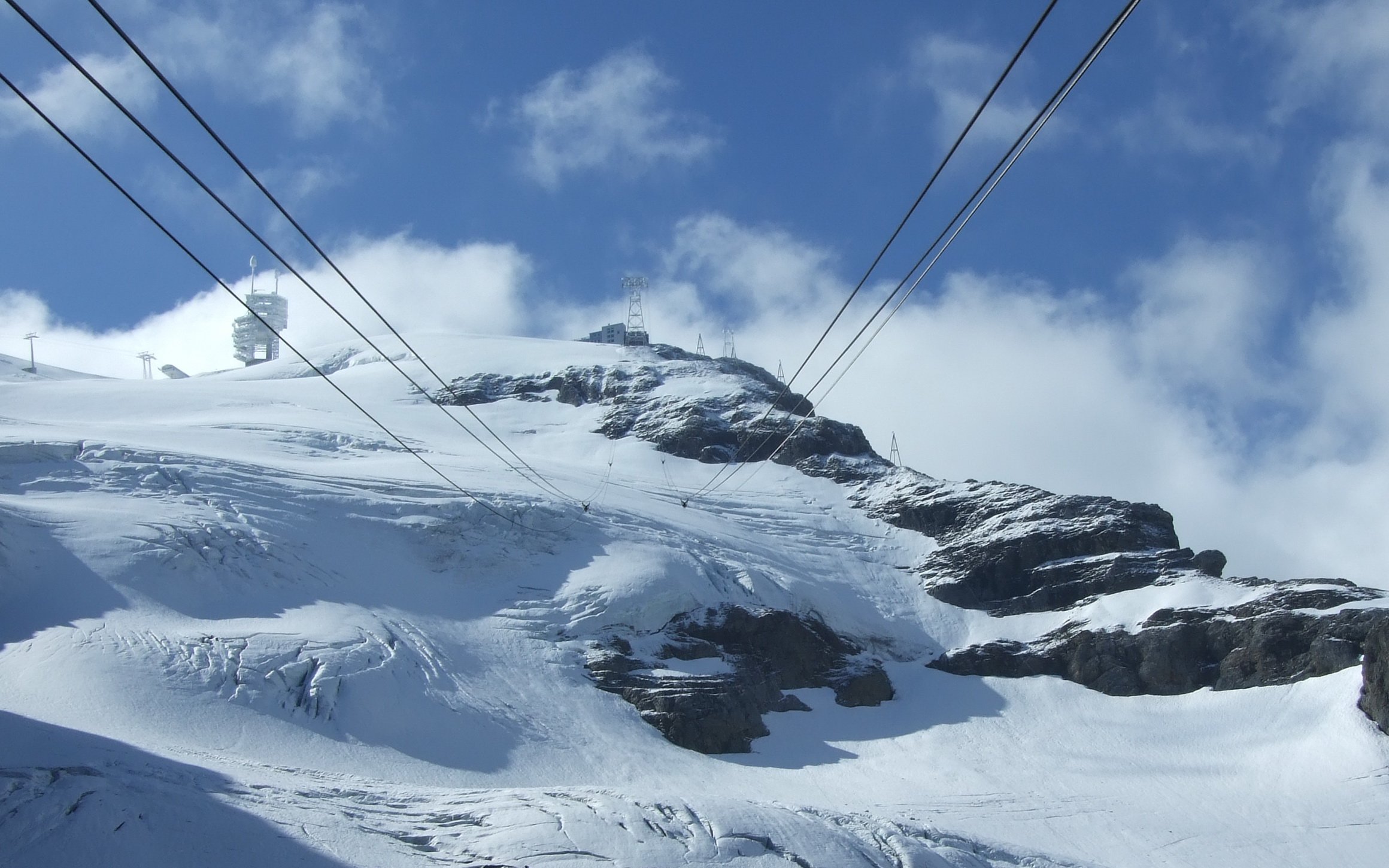
Stand-Klein Titlis cableway (July 2010)

Engelberg (lit.: mountain of angel(s)) is a village resort and a municipality in the canton of Obwalden in Switzerland. Alongside the central village of Engelberg, the municipality encompasses additional settlements, including Grafenort, Oberberg and Schwand.

The municipality of Engelberg is an exclave, entirely encircled by the neighboring cantons of Bern, Nidwalden and Uri.

Engelberg is a mountain resort in Central Switzerland. In the Middle Ages, the area garnered recognition for its Benedictine monastery, known as Engelberg Abbey. As time progressed, particularly from the 19th century onwards, Engelberg became a well-known mountain resort. The city of Lucerne serves as the nearest major urban center.

While the official language of Engelberg is German, the predominant spoken language is the local variation of the Alemannic Swiss German dialect.

== History ==
Engelberg's earliest mention dates to 1122, denoted as Engilperc, concurrent with the founding of the Abbey. Prior to this, the Alpine pasture of Trüebsee was already collectively utilized by the locals.

In August 1815, as Nidwalden hesitated in accepting the Federal Treaty, Engelberg promptly expressed its support. Federal troops entered Nidwalden, ultimately prompting their acceptance of the treaty on 18 August 1815. Consequently, Engelberg was incorporated into the canton of Obwalden.

The mid-19th century ushered in Engelberg's emergence as a vacation destination, known for its therapeutic mineral water, milk serum and fresh air. The efforts of families such as Cattani, Hess, and Odermatt led to the establishment of a number of hotels, cementing the region's status as a tourist destination. Related developments included the construction of a broader road between 1872 and 1874, as well as the inauguration of the Stansstad-Engelberg electric railway in 1898.

Engelberg's reputation as a hub for hiking and other mountain activities grew toward the end of the 19th century. The winter season made its debut in 1903-1904. The Gerschnialpbahn, a funicular railway (unveiled in 1913), connected Engelberg to Gerschni with a subsequent cable car (inaugurated in 1927) extending the journey to Ober Trüebsee. The pre-World War I era was characterized by robust growth, as indicated by a substantial influx of visitors (165,922 visitor-nights in 1911). The expansion of roadways and the extension of the railway to Lucerne (achieved in 1964) enhanced the accessibility of Engelberg. Further advancements were marked by the opening of the higher segment of the Titlis cable car in 1967. Over time, Engelberg's appeal extended beyond tourism, hosting regular conferences. By the turn of the millennium, the tertiary sector, particularly tourism, contributed significantly to employment in Engelberg.

== Geography ==
Aerial view from 1000 m by Walter Mittelholzer (1919)

Engelberg is situated within the Uri Alps mountain range.

Engelberg is surrounded by several mountain summits, such as Titlis in the south (3,238 metres (10,623 ft)) above sea level), the Walenstöcke (2,572 metres (8,438 ft)) and Ruchstock (2,813 metres (9,229 ft)) to the north, Hahnen (2,606 metres (8,550 ft)) and Wissberg (2,627 metres (8,619 ft)) to the east, the Engelberger Rotstock (2,819 metres (9,249 ft)) and the Wissigstock (2,887 metres (9,472 ft)) to the northeast, and the upper valley of the Engelberger Aa leading to the Surenen Pass (2,291 metres (7,516 ft)) leading to the Urner Reusstal.

Engelberg has an area (as of the 2004/09 survey) of 74.87 km^{2} (28.91 sq mi). Of this area, about 27.1% is used for agricultural purposes, while 25.8% is forested. Of the rest of the land, 3.7% is settled (buildings or roads) and 43.5% is unproductive land. In the 2013/18 survey a total of 146 ha (360 acres) or about 1.9% of the total area was covered with buildings, an increase of 35 ha (86 acres) over the 1980/81 amount. Over the same time period, the amount of recreational space in the municipality increased by 34 ha (84 acres) and is now about 0.61% of the total area. Of the agricultural land, 685 ha (1,690 acres) is fields and grasslands and 1,424 ha (3,520 acres) consists of alpine grazing areas. Since 1980/81 the amount of agricultural land has decreased by 156 ha (390 acres). Over the same time period the amount of forested land has increased by 103 ha (250 acres). Rivers and lakes cover 78 ha (190 acres) in the municipality.

The average altitude of Engelberg is 1,020 m (3,350 ft). However the village is surrounded by the Alps, creating very steep terrain. The highest point in the borders of the municipality is the Titlis. The Engelberg Valley (German: Engelbergertal) is drained by the Engelberger Aa, a tributary of Lake Lucerne. The valley is located southwards from the lake.

== Transport ==
The municipality of Engelberg is served by two stations on the Luzern–Stans–Engelberg line. Engelberg railway station is located in the village and is the terminus of the line. Grafenort station is to the north, one station away. Both stations are served by hourly InterRegio trains from the city of Lucerne.

A free bus system provides daytime transport within the village, with a network of seven routes during the winter season (from December through to April) and a single route during the summer season (from April until October).

Drahtseilbahn Engelberg–Hotel Terrasse, a funicular from the village to Hotel Terrace operated from 1905 to 2008, with some interruptions. Gerschnialpbahn opened in 1913.

== Tourism ==
The tourist activities in the village and surrounding area include skiing and other snow sports in the winter season, and hiking and mountain activities during the summer.

In the village itself the main sights are the Benedictine monastery Engelberg Abbey which incorporates a cheese factory and demonstration shop, the Talmuseum showing the history of the area and Swiss rural life, and a number of old chapels.

The winter sports season generally lasts from December until April, although the high altitude glacier areas on the Titlis can sometimes be used (by advanced skiers) from October until May. Snow coverage is generally reliable, although in recent years artificial snow machines have been installed on some of the lower altitude runs in order to improve snow cover.

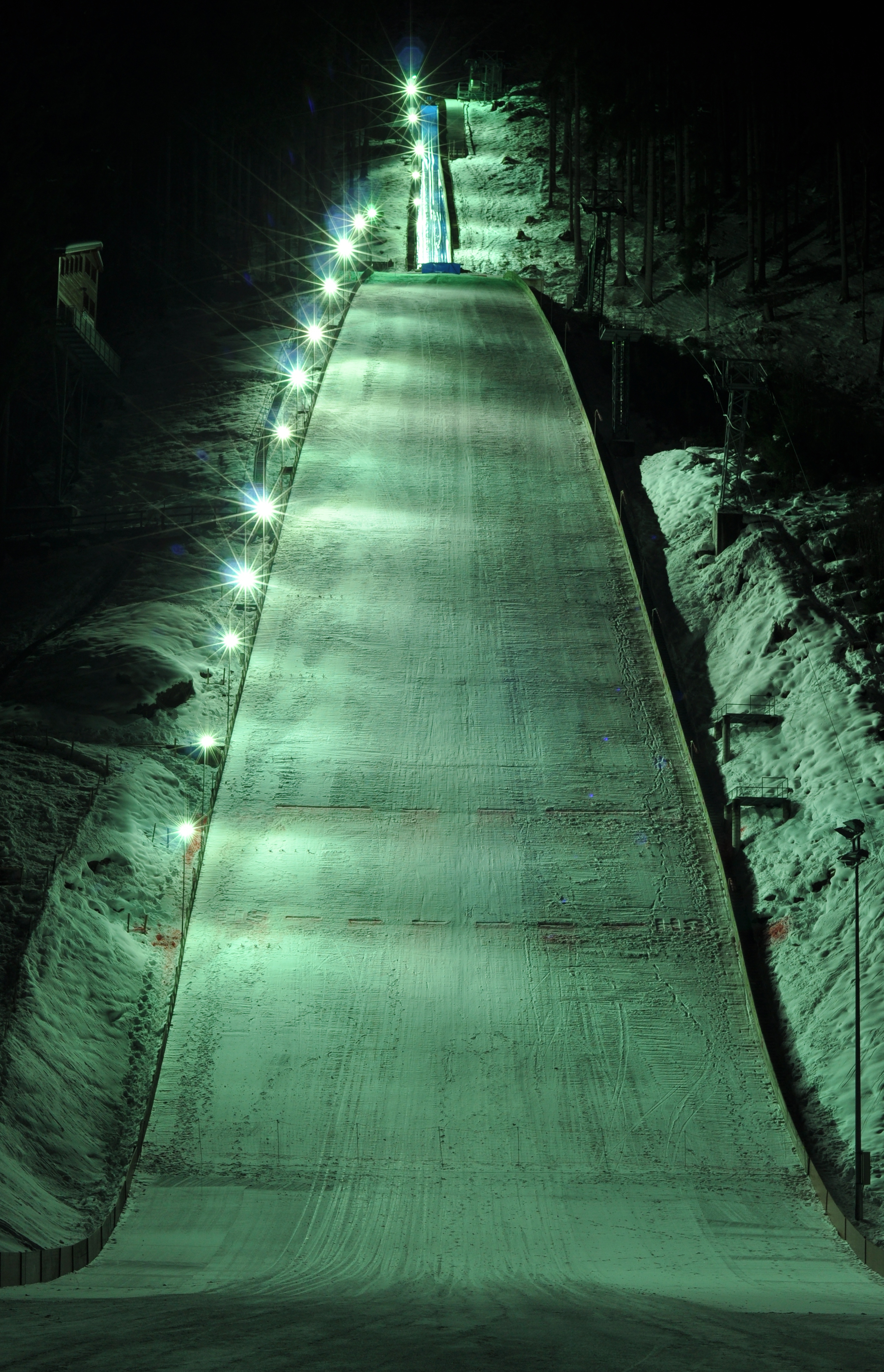
Gross-Titlis-Schanze

Engelberg hosts a round of the ski jumping World Cup at the Gross-Titlis-Schanze jump.

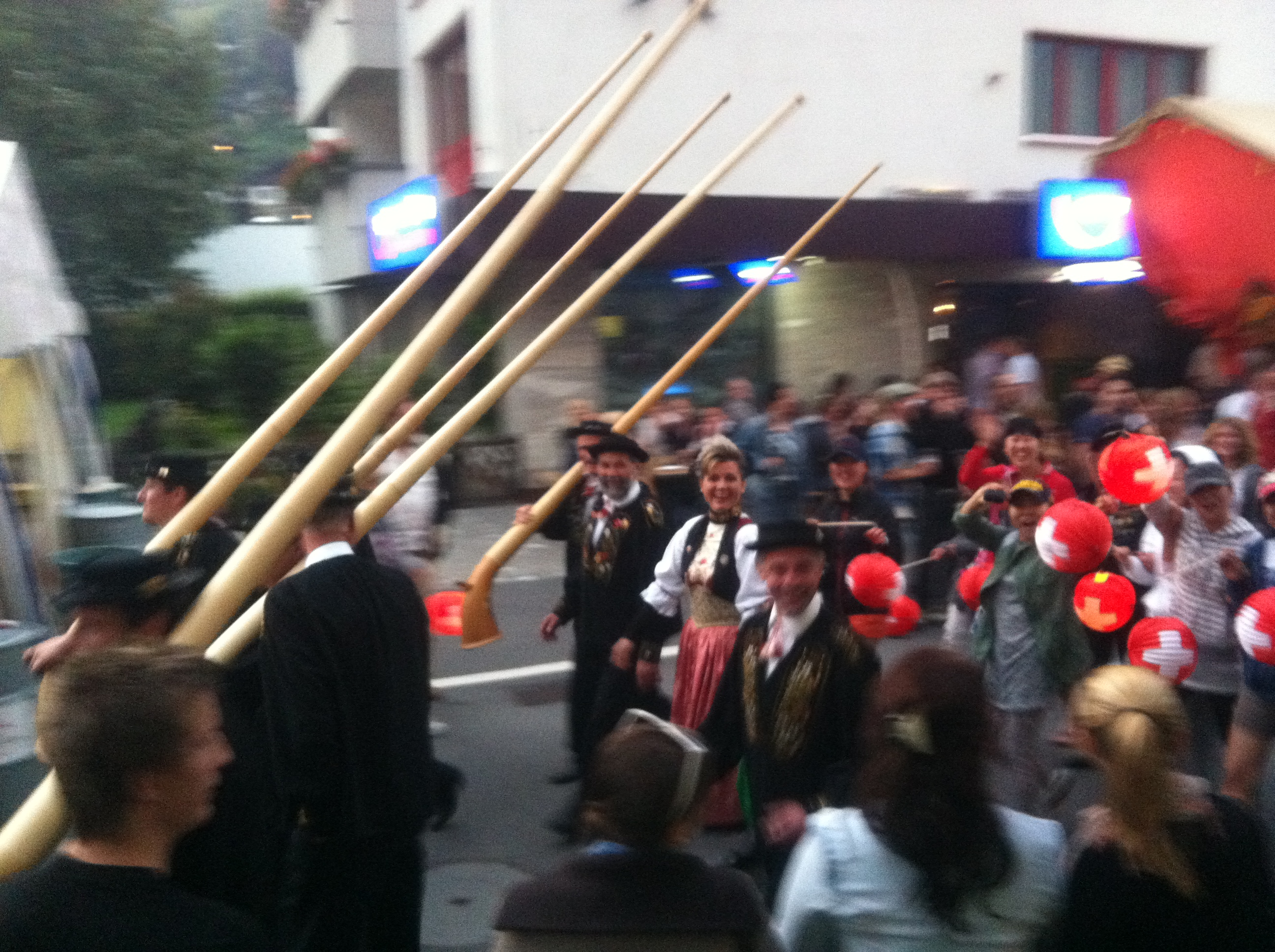
1 August parade in Engelberg

In common with the rest of Switzerland, there is a village celebration for Swiss National Day on 1 August, with parades and events throughout the day.

Der Alpabzug

On the last Saturday in September the Alpabzug takes place, when the cattle are brought from the mountain pastures back to their winter barns in the village and valley.

There are three main mountain areas, accessible from the village, offering various activities in winter and summer. The cable cars generally run all year round, providing access for hikers and mountain bikers as well as skiers.

=== Titlis ===
The Titlis in the south of Engelberg at 3,238 metres (10,623 ft) above sea level is the highest summit of the range north of the Susten Pass, between the Bernese Oberland and Central Switzerland.

The Titlis mountain massif is accessible by cable cars of the Titlis Bergbahnen. The cable car bottom station is also the central terminus of the village bus services. A funicular railway (dating from 1913) runs up to station Gerschnialp (1,267 m (4,157 ft)) and a wide Alpine pasture called Gerschni, with easy snow areas suitable for beginners and cross country ski trails, and a toboggan run leading back down to the valley station. In the summer there are two cheese dairies, with walking trails leading up to Ober Trüebsee and back down to the village, or level trails leading to Unter Trüebsee to the west.

The "Titlis Xpress" gondola lift, opened in 2015 to replace an older one dating from the 1970s, runs from the valley station (996 m (3,268 ft)) up to the middle station Trübsee (1,788 m (5,866 ft)) and on to Stand (2,428 m (7,966 ft)). This area provides more challenging skiing, on the lower slopes of the Titlis and via further chair lifts to the Jochpass (2,207 m (7,241 ft)) and below the Jochstock at 2,508 m (8,228 ft). A continuous ski piste leads down to Unter Trüebsee and back to the cable car valley station. In summer the lake is a destination for walkers, with rowing boats available on the lake and picnic places around it. Walking routes lead over the Jochpass to Engstlenalp and Melchsee-Frutt, or directly from Engleberg over the Juchli Pass (2,171 m (7,123 ft)) or Storegg Pass (1,742 m (5,715 ft))) into the Melchtal.

The "Rotair" cable car ("the world's first rotating cable car") runs up to the Kleintitlis mountain station (3,028 m (9,934 ft)) where there is a restaurant and shops, an observation terrace and access to the glacier and summit. The high altitude glacier runs down from the peak are suitable for advanced skiers, with off-piste routes leading down to Trüebsee and the Laubersgrat ridge.

=== Brunni ===
The Brunni mountain area, to the north of the village, is accessible from the cable car station which runs up to Ristis (1,600 m (5,200 ft)), with a further chair lift up to Brunnihütte (1,860 m (6,100 ft)). The ski runs here are of a beginner to medium standard, although sometimes not having so much snow cover as the Titlis side due to the south facing aspect. There is another toboggan run from Brunnihütte back down to Ristis. In summer there are a number of walking trails starting from here, including the Walenpfad leading to Bannalp and the Rot Grätli ridge across the mountains to the north and northeast. There are also a number of prepared rock climbing routes (German: Klettersteig).

=== Fürenalp ===
At the eastern end of the Engelberg valley, there is a cable car up to Fürenalp (1,840 m (6,040 ft)), passing over the Fürenwand rock climbing area. From the top station or from the valley, summer walking routes with views of the Chli Spannort (3,140 m (10,300 ft)) and Gross Spannort (3,198 m (10,492 ft)) mountain peaks lead to the Surenenpass (2,291 m (7,516 ft)) in the east.

=== Heritage sites ===
Engelberg is home to three sites that are Swiss heritage sites of national significance; Engelberg Abbey with its library, archives and music collection, the mansion (Herrenhaus) in Grafenort and the Holy Cross chapel in Grafenort.

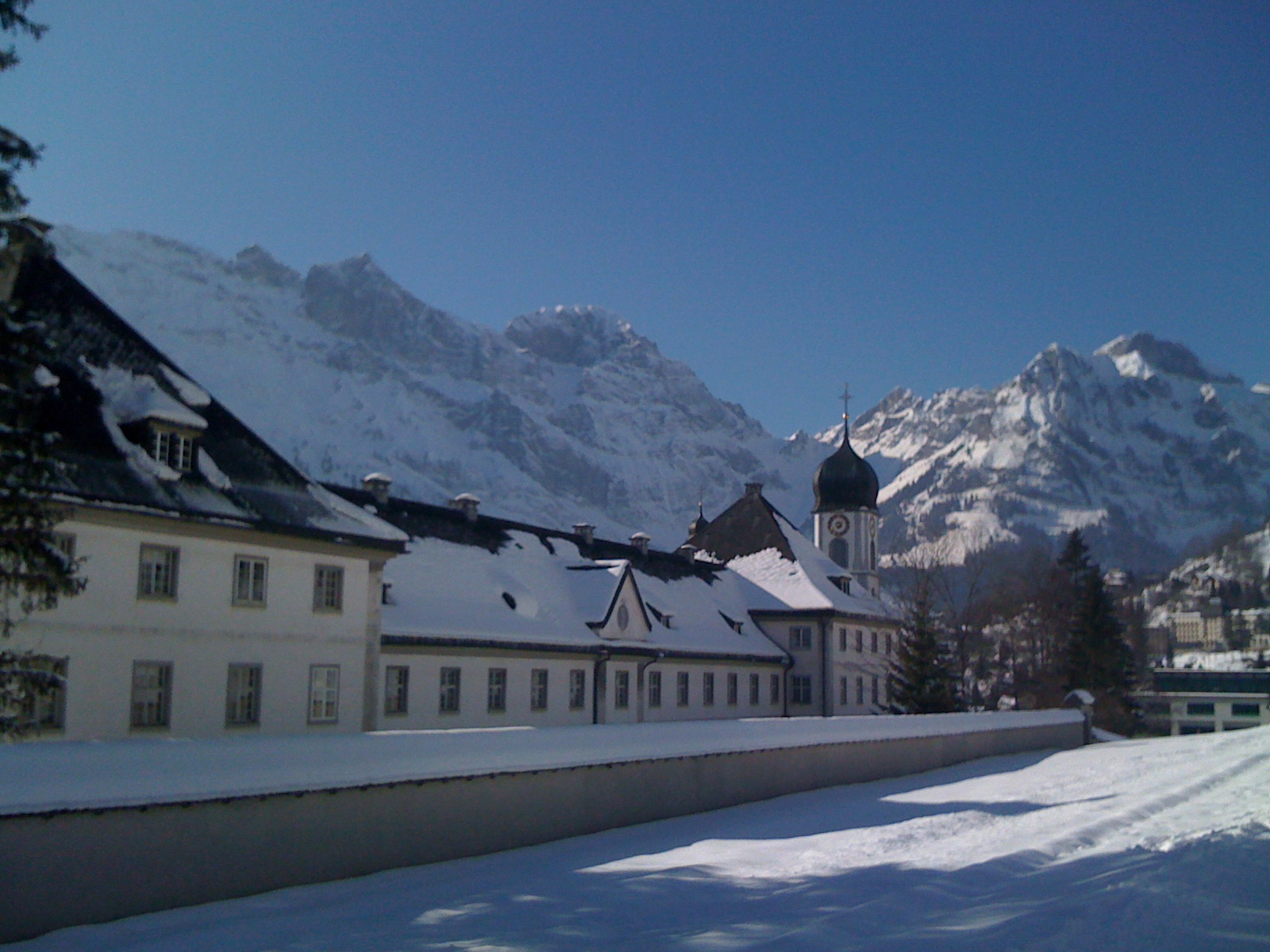
Benedictine Abbey

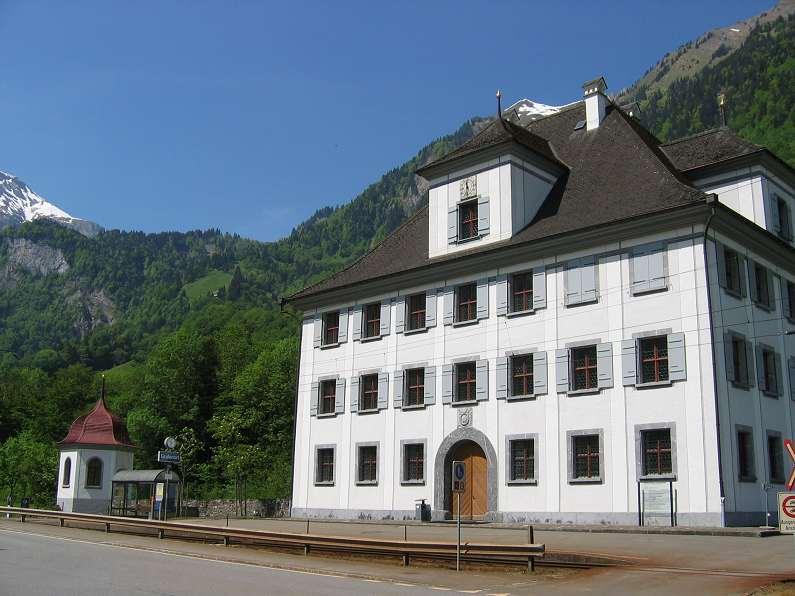
Mansion in Grafenort with Garden Pavillon

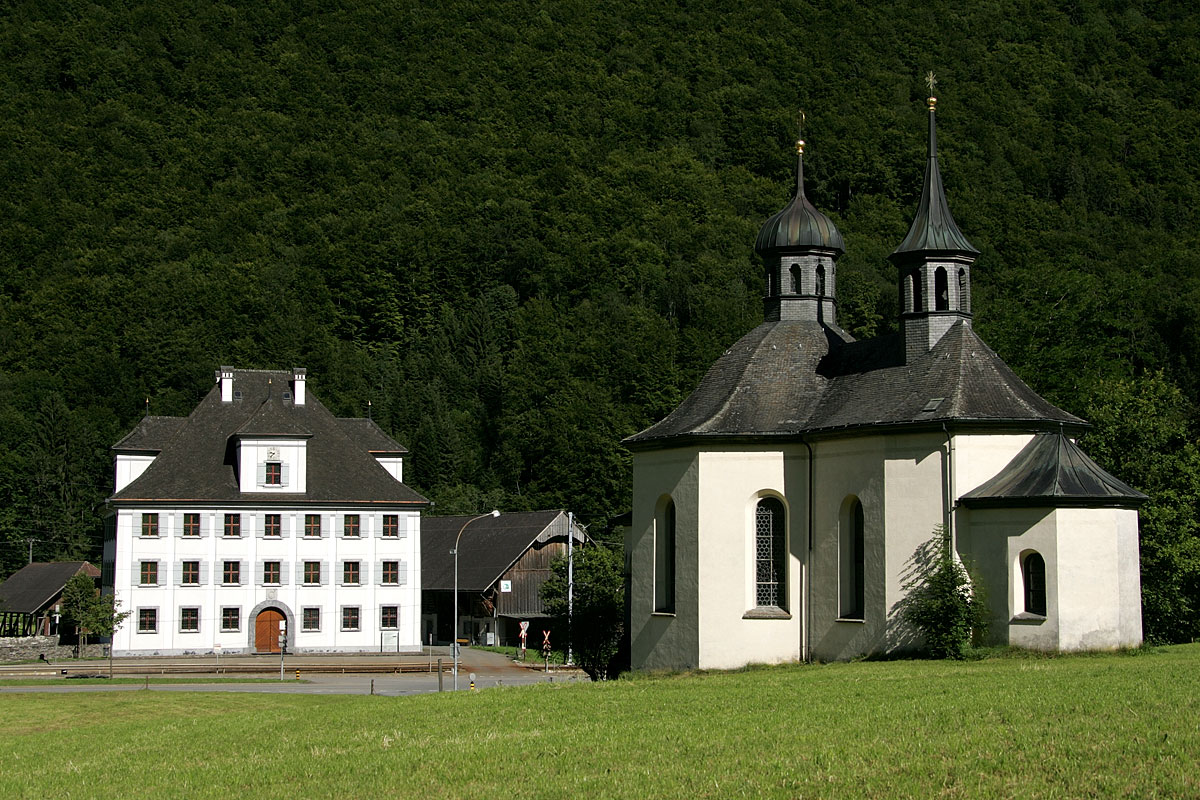
Holy Cross Chapel

== Demographics ==
The historical population is given in the following table:

Year	Population
1709	678
1799	1,468
1850	1,737
1900	1,973
1950	2,544
2000	3,544
2010	3,859

Religion in Engelberg – 2010
1. Roman Catholic (66.0%)
2. Swiss Reformed Church (13.0%)
3. Other Christian/religion (12.0%)
4. Undeclared/unaffiliated (9.00%)

Engelberg has a population (as of December 2020) of 4,194. As of 2016, 26.2% of the population are resident foreign nationals. In 2015 a small minority (259 or 6.3% of the population) was born in Germany. Over the last 6 years (2010-2016) the population has changed at a rate of 5.92%. The birth rate in the municipality, in 2016, was 8.3, while the death rate was 5.8 per thousand residents.

As of 2016, children and teenagers (0–19 years old) make up 17.7% of the population, while adults (20–64 years old) are 61.4% of the population and seniors (over 64 years old) make up 20.9%. In 2015 there were 1,762 single residents, 1,808 people who were married or in a civil partnership, 230 widows or widowers and 297 divorced residents.

In 2016 there were 1,925 private households in Engelberg with an average household size of 2.10 persons. In 2015 about 43% of all buildings in the municipality were single family homes, which is about the same as the percentage in the canton (44.4%) and less than the percentage nationally (57.4%). Of the 1,302 inhabited buildings in the municipality, in 2000, about 48.5% were single family homes and 34.4% were multiple family buildings. Additionally, about 17.1% of the buildings were built before 1919, while 9.4% were built between 1991 and 2000. In 2015 the rate of construction of new housing units per 1000 residents was 8.3. The vacancy rate for the municipality, in 2017, was 0.92%.

Most of the population (as of 2000) speaks German as their mother tongue (88.2%), with Serbo-Croatian being second most common (2.5%) and English being third (2.2%). As of 2000 the gender distribution of the population was 49.9% male and 50.1% female.

== Politics ==
In the 2015 federal election small, local parties received 53.5% of the vote and the SVP received the remainder (46.5%). In the federal election, a total of 1,476 votes were cast, and the voter turnout was 56.4%.

In the 2007 election the most popular party was the SVP which received 37.4% of the vote. The next three most popular parties were a variety of other parties (not major) (28.6%), the CVP (22.7%) and the SPS (11.3%).

== Education ==
In Engelberg about 65.5% of the population (between age 25–64) have completed either non-mandatory upper secondary education or additional higher education (either university or a Fachhochschule).

== Business and industry ==
Engelberg is classed as a tourist community.

As of 2014, there were a total of 2,547 people employed in the municipality. Of these, a total of 143 people worked in 56 businesses in the primary economic sector. The secondary sector employed 267 workers in 54 separate businesses, of which 6 businesses employed a total of 117 employees. Finally, the tertiary sector provided 2,137 jobs in 372 businesses.

In 2016 a total of 8.3% of the population received social assistance. In 2011 the unemployment rate in the municipality was 1.1%.

In 2015 local hotels had a total of 354,960 overnight stays, of which 67.1% were international visitors.

In 2015 the average cantonal, municipal and church tax rate in the municipality for a couple with two children making SFr 80,000 was 5.5% while the rate for a single person making SFr 150,000 was 11.1%, both of which are much lower than the average for the canton. The canton has a slightly higher than average tax rate for those making SFr 80,000 and one of the lowest for those making SFr 150,000. In 2013 the average income in the municipality per tax payer was SFr 88,070 and the per person average was SFr 45,328, which is greater than the cantonal averages of SFr 87,563 and SFr 38,842 respectively It is also greater than the national per tax payer average of SFr 82,682 and the per person average of SFr 35,825.

Due to the risks of filming in the disputed region of Kashmir, many Indian films requiring a Kashmir snowy mountain setting have been filmed in Engelberg in the recent past.

== Cultural references ==
Engelberg is mentioned in chapter XXIV of Henry James's 1875 novel Roderick Hudson.

== Climate ==
Between 1991 and 2020 Engelberg had an average of 151 days of rain or snow per year and on average received 1,568 mm (61.7 in) of precipitation. The wettest month was July with 198 mm (7.8 in) of precipitation over 15.7 days. However June had the most precipitation days (15.9) but only 179 mm (7.0 in). The driest months of the year was February with 81 mm (3.2 in) of precipitation over 10.0 days.

This area has a long winter season, with little precipitation mostly in the form of snow, and low humidity. The Köppen Climate System classifies the climate in Engelberg as Oceanic. MeteoSwiss's classification is Central Alpine northslope.

Climate data for Engelberg, elevation 1,036 m (3,399 ft), (1991–2020 normals, extremes 1973–present)
Month	Jan	Feb	Mar	Apr	May	Jun	Jul	Aug	Sep	Oct	Nov	Dec	Year
Record high °C (°F)	16.1 (61.0)	16.5 (61.7)	20.9 (69.6)	24.0 (75.2)	28.2 (82.8)	31.5 (88.7)	33.1 (91.6)	32.4 (90.3)	29.5 (85.1)	24.9 (76.8)	20.5 (68.9)	18.4 (65.1)	33.1 (91.6)
Mean daily maximum °C (°F)	2.0 (35.6)	3.0 (37.4)	7.3 (45.1)	11.7 (53.1)	16.0 (60.8)	19.3 (66.7)	21.0 (69.8)	20.6 (69.1)	16.3 (61.3)	12.2 (54.0)	6.4 (43.5)	2.8 (37.0)	11.6 (52.9)
Daily mean °C (°F)	−1.7 (28.9)	−1.1 (30.0)	2.5 (36.5)	6.3 (43.3)	10.4 (50.7)	13.8 (56.8)	15.4 (59.7)	15.2 (59.4)	11.4 (52.5)	7.6 (45.7)	2.5 (36.5)	−0.8 (30.6)	6.8 (44.2)
Mean daily minimum °C (°F)	−5.3 (22.5)	−5.1 (22.8)	−1.7 (28.9)	1.5 (34.7)	5.4 (41.7)	8.9 (48.0)	10.7 (51.3)	10.7 (51.3)	7.2 (45.0)	3.8 (38.8)	−0.9 (30.4)	−4.2 (24.4)	2.6 (36.7)
Record low °C (°F)	−27.3 (−17.1)	−23.8 (−10.8)	−21.3 (−6.3)	−12.7 (9.1)	−5.6 (21.9)	−0.5 (31.1)	0.9 (33.6)	1.7 (35.1)	−1.8 (28.8)	−12.0 (10.4)	−16.4 (2.5)	−21.7 (−7.1)	−27.3 (−17.1)
Average precipitation mm (inches)	89.4 (3.52)	81.3 (3.20)	98.5 (3.88)	112.1 (4.41)	165.7 (6.52)	178.6 (7.03)	198.2 (7.80)	196.2 (7.72)	128.0 (5.04)	109.8 (4.32)	102.5 (4.04)	107.2 (4.22)	1,567.5 (61.71)
Average snowfall cm (inches)	78.5 (30.9)	82.1 (32.3)	75.4 (29.7)	43.2 (17.0)	3.6 (1.4)	0.0 (0.0)	0.0 (0.0)	0.0 (0.0)	0.0 (0.0)	7.1 (2.8)	52.5 (20.7)	72.4 (28.5)	414.8 (163.3)
Average precipitation days (≥ 1.0 mm)	11.4	10.0	12.2	12.0	14.5	15.9	15.7	14.7	11.7	10.3	10.9	11.7	151.0
Average snowy days (≥ 1.0 cm)	8.4	8.1	7.8	5.4	0.8	0.0	0.0	0.0	0.0	0.7	5.2	8.3	44.7
Average relative humidity (%)	79	77	74	72	76	78	79	81	84	82	81	80	79
Mean monthly sunshine hours	51.1	91.8	128.2	146.4	147.4	158.1	164.0	156.5	131.5	112.0	61.5	31.3	1,379.8
Percentage possible sunshine	46	47	46	47	42	42	45	48	46	47	44	42	45
Source 1: NOAA
Source 2: MeteoSwiss (snow 1981–2010)Infoclimat (extremes)

== Notable people ==
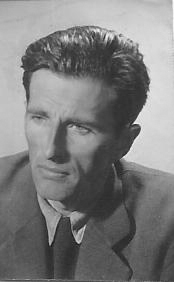
Hermann Hess Helfenstein, 1950

- Baroness Felicitas von Reznicek, (1904-1997 in Engelberg), German writer, a British agent during WWII
- Herbert Matter (1907–1984) an American photographer and graphic designer, used photomontage
- Giuseppe Piazzi (1907–1963 in Engelberg), bishop of Bergamo
- Hermann Hess Helfenstein (1916-2008) a Swiss naturalist, explorer, climber and engineer.

=== Sport ===
- Rolf Olinger (1924–2006) a Swiss alpine skier and bronze medallist at the 1948 Winter Olympics
- Erika Hess (born 1962), bronze medallist at the Alpine skiing at the 1980 Winter Olympics
- Dominique Gisin (born 1985), gold medallist at the Alpine skiing at the 2014 Winter Olympics
- Denise Feierabend (born 1989) a Swiss former World Cup alpine ski racer.
- Michelle Gisin (born 1993) alpine ski racer, gold medallist at the 2018 & 2022 Winter Olympics.
- Lena Häcki (born 1995), Junior Biathlon silver medallist.
- Fabian Bösch (born 1997), Olympic freestyle skier and 2015 slopestyle gold medallist
- Fabio Scherer (born 1999), racing driver
