= Hermann Hess Helfenstein =

Swiss naturalist, explorer, climber and engineer

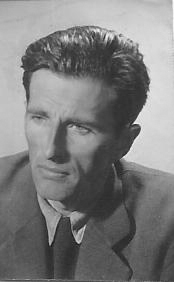
- Born: 3 February 1916; Engelberg, Obwalden, Switzerland
- Died: 14 October 2008 (aged 92); Santiago, Chile
- Occupations: Member of the "Schweizer Alpen Club" (SAC in Switzerland) and "Deutscher Anden Verein" (DAV in Chile)
- Known for: Swiss Naturalist, Explorer and Climber
- Notable work: He stood out for first ascents and exploration in Patagonia

Hermann Hess Helfenstein (3 February 1916 – 14 October 2008) was a Swiss naturalist, explorer, climber and engineer. He was member of the "Schweizer Alpen Club" (SAC in Switzerland) and "Deutscher Anden Verein" (DAV in Chile). He was notable for first ascents and exploration in Patagonia.

== Career as naturalist, explorer and climber ==
He was born in Engelberg, a mountain village in Switzerland, where his`parents ran a hotel. He began climbing with his father who was also a mountain guide.

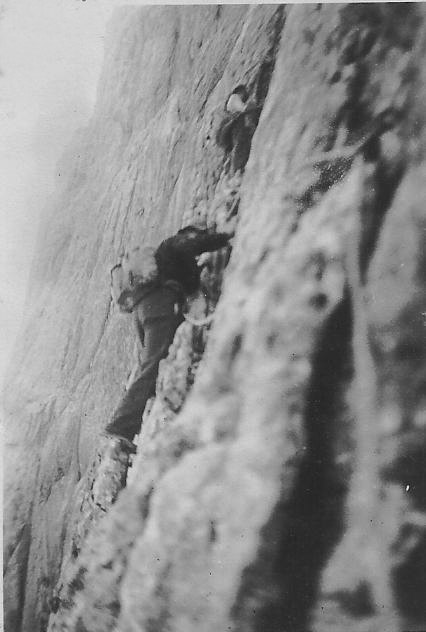
First Climbing Titlis North Face in Engelberg Switzerland in 1935 by H. Hess, W. Hoehn and O. Bolli

In 1937, he emigrated to South America and in the South Andes Mountain Range he first climbed the Volcano Puntiagudo with his partner R. Roth through the South Face.

Hermann Hess led three expeditions to Northern Patagonian Ice Field. Two of them were for geological purposes, started from the east and was sponsored by the Swiss Geologist A. Heim. The expedition from 15 December 1939 to 16 January 1940 was integrated by H. Hess, A. Heim, W. Schmitt, H. Moser and H. Neumayer. and the expedition from 18 November to 31 December 1945 was integrated by H.Hess, A. Heim, H. Smoll, A. Valmitjana and J. Studer. There he gave unknown and nameless summits a denomination, such as Cerro Cristal and Cerro Tronco climbing them for the first time.

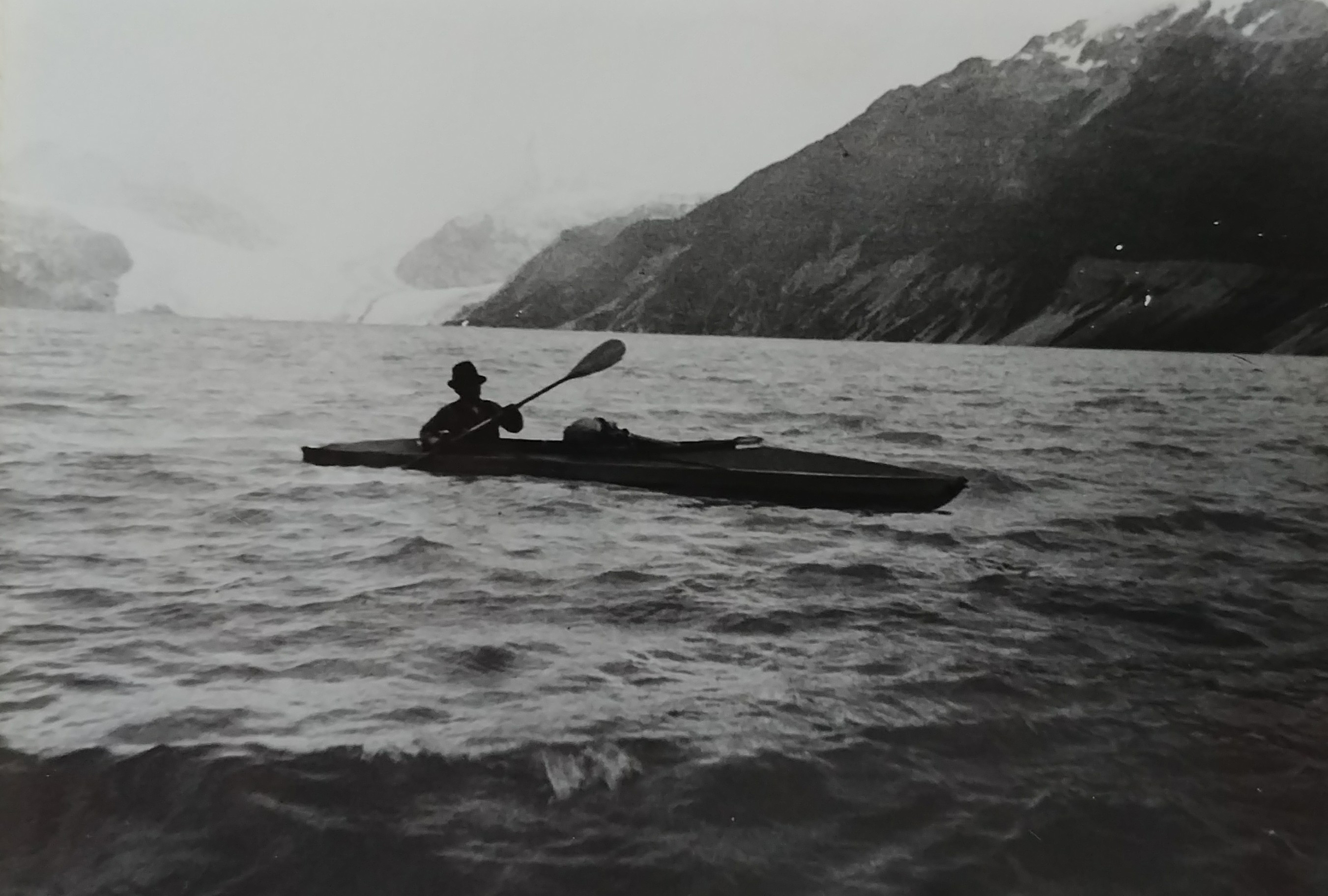
Kayaking for the approach to Northern Patagonian Ice Field during the Geological Expedition from 1939 to 1940

Hermann Hess led and sponsored a 5-month expedition to the Northern Patagonian Ice Field from 1 November 1941 to 1 March 1942, starting this time from the west with E. Hoffmann, J. Alig, G. Mani and the porter I. Vargas finding severe climatical and geographical difficulties. In that decade he made also the successful first climb with R. Eggmann and J. Neumeyer to isolated Cerro Maca in 1944.

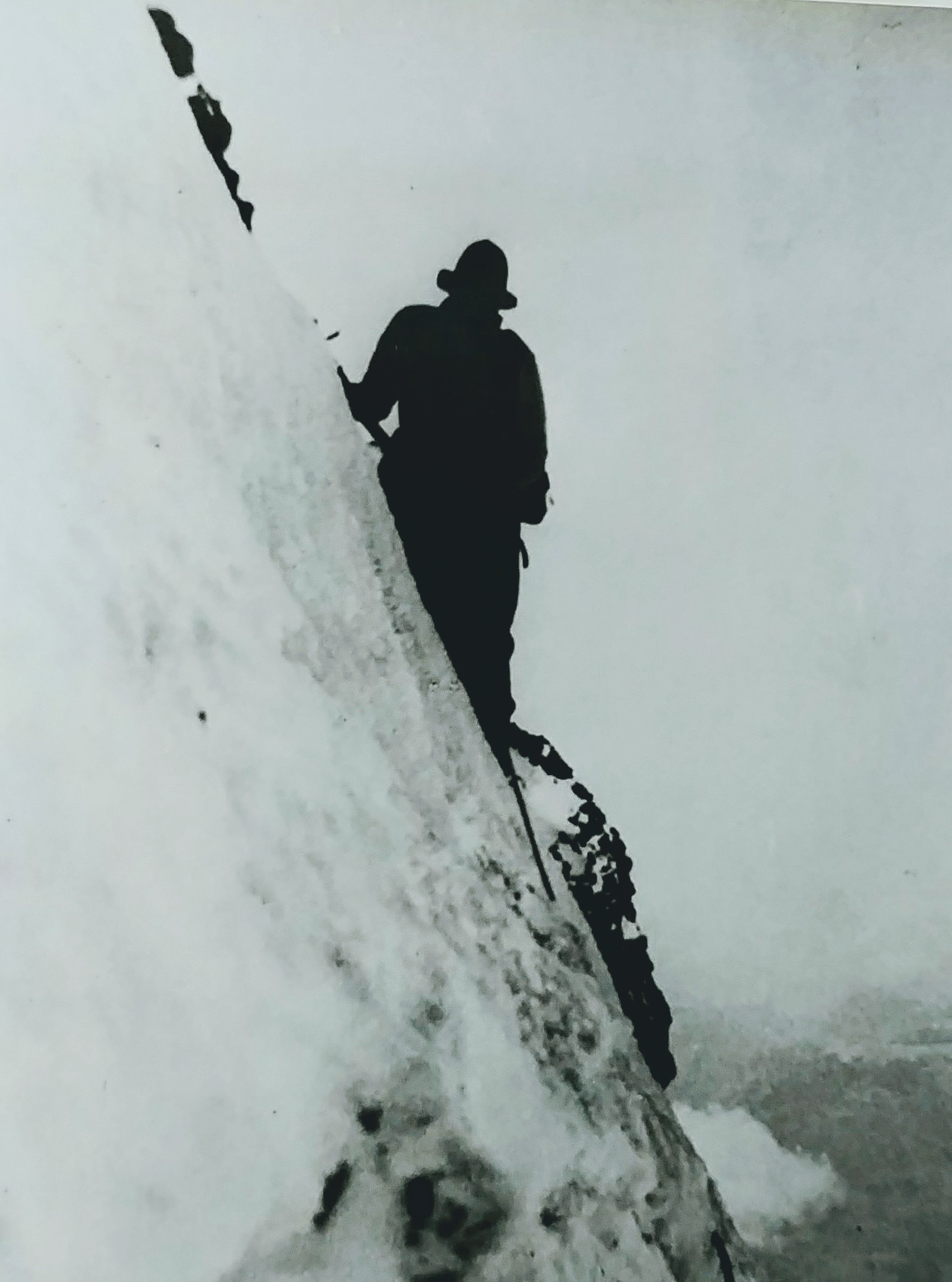
H. Hess, U. Lorber and H. Stehr climbing the main summit of Mount Tronador (3491 m) in 1963

== Return to Switzerland ==
In 1950 he married Frida Schwabe in Puerto Varas. They had two children, German and Roland and in 1960 he returned to Switzerland. There he climbed the Mont Blanc, Weisshorn, Matterhorn, Eiger and Piz Palü.

He returned to Santiago, Capital of Chile, in 1963 and undertook the higher summits of the North Andes Mountain Range with members of DAV W. Foerster, F. Oestemer, H. Janko and other climbers until his death in 2008.

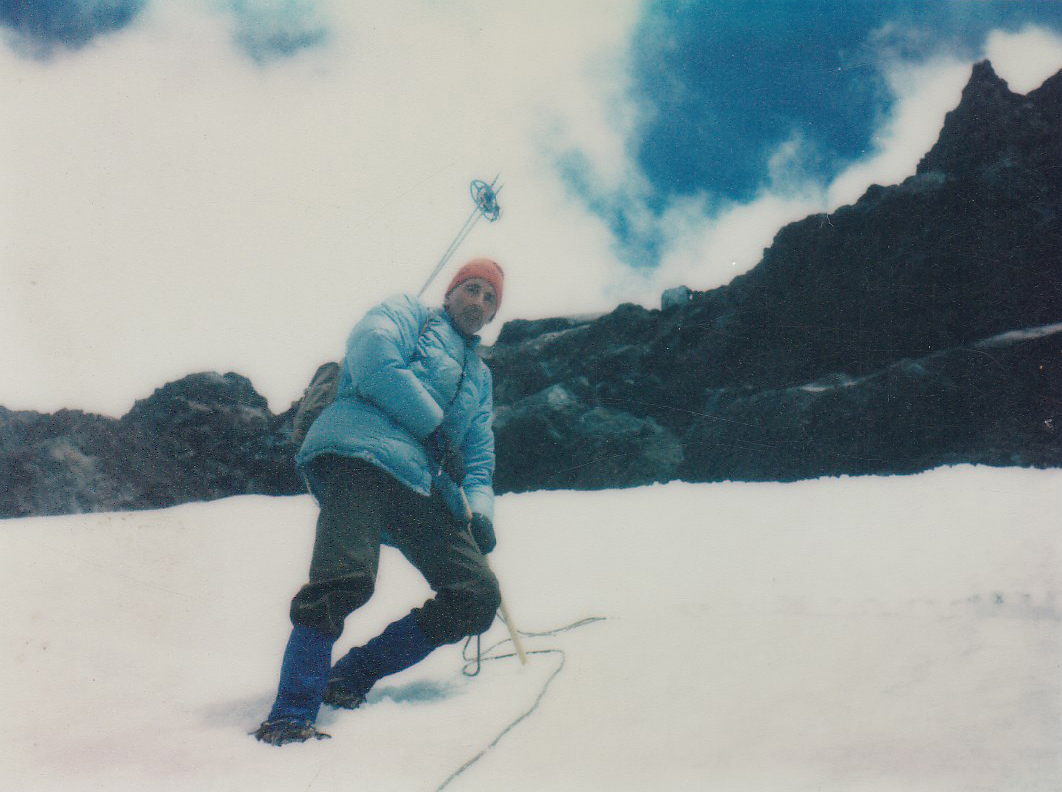
H. Hess climbing in the nineties
