= Engelberger Rotstock =

Mountain in Switzerland

- Location within Switzerland

Highest point
- Elevation: 2,818 m (9,245 ft)
- Prominence: 132 m (433 ft)
- Parent peak: Wissigstock
- Coordinates: 46°51′13.5″N 8°29′52.5″E

Geography
- Location: Obwalden/Uri, Switzerland
- Parent range: Urner Alps

The Engelberger Rotstock is a mountain of the Urner Alps, overlooking Engelberg. It lies on the border between the Swiss cantons of Obwalden and Uri.
