= Hahnen =

Mountain in Switzerland

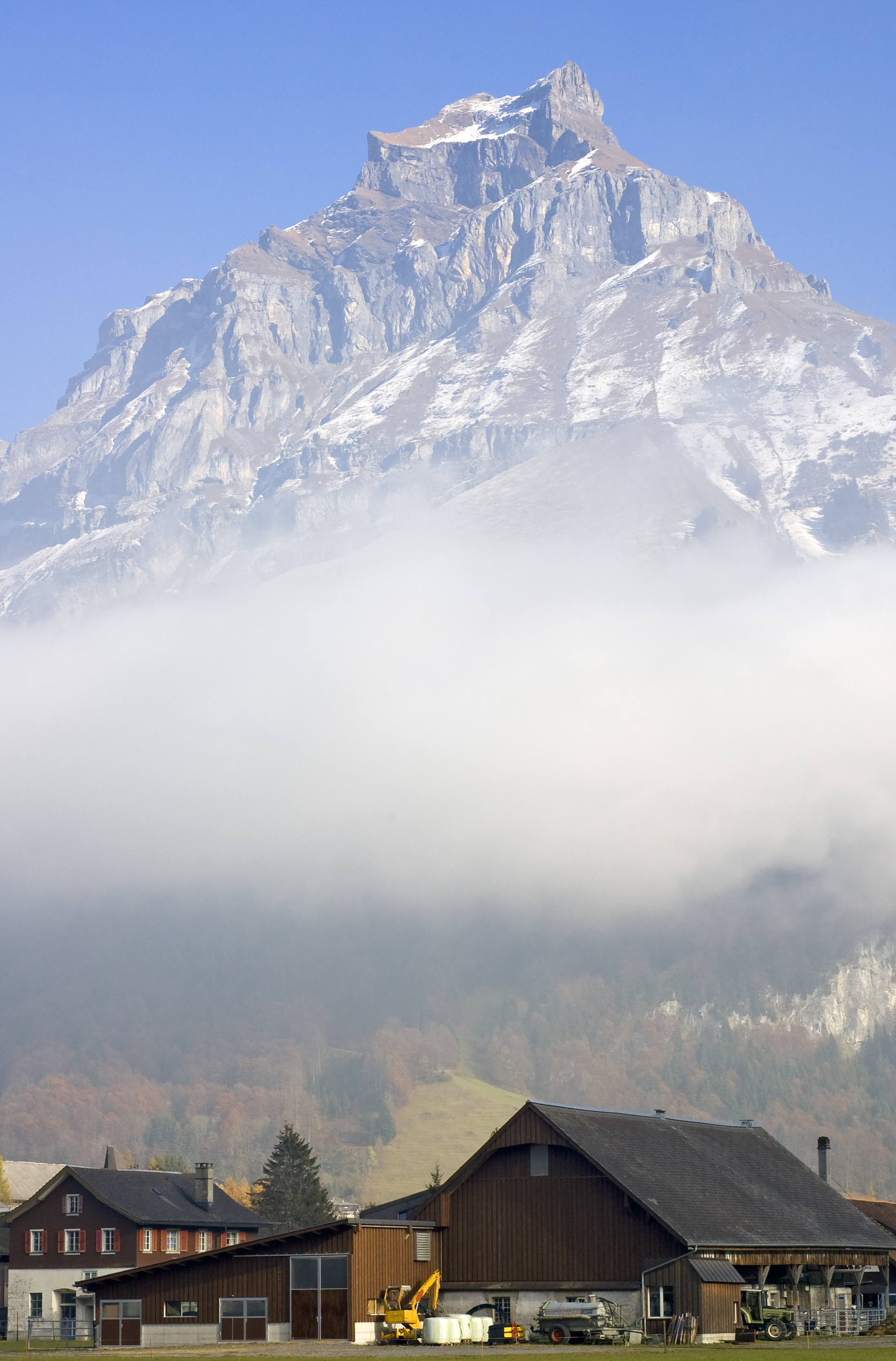
- View from Engelberg (west side)

Highest point
- Elevation: 2,606 m (8,550 ft)
- Prominence: 201 m (659 ft)
- Parent peak: Brunnistock
- Coordinates: 46°49′26″N 8°27′20.2″E

Geography
- Location within Switzerland
- Location: Obwalden, Switzerland
- Parent range: Urner Alps

The Hahnen is a mountain of the Urner Alps, overlooking Engelberg in the Swiss canton of Obwalden. It has an elevation of 2,606 metres above sea level.
