= Nidwalden =

Canton of Switzerland

Canton of Nidwalden Kanton Nidwalden (German) Canton of Nidwald
- Canton
- Flag Coat of arms Logo

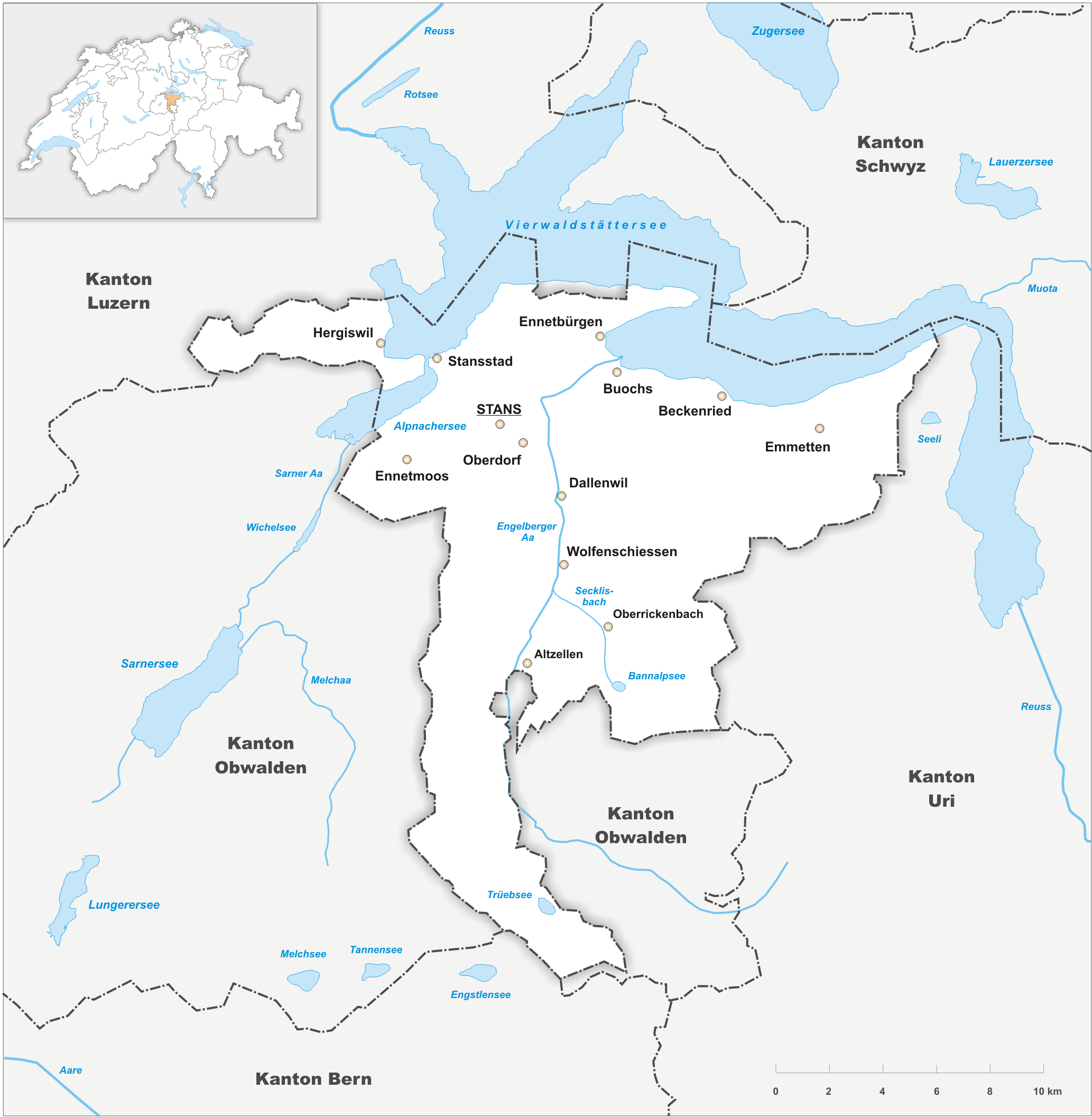
- Location in Switzerland Map of Nidwalden
- Coordinates: 46°56′N 8°4′E
- Capital: Stans
- Subdivisions: 11 municipalities

Government
  - President: Res Schmid
  - Executive: Regierungsrat (7)
  - Legislative: Landrat (60)

Area
  - Total: 275.84 km^{2} (106.50 sq mi)

Population (December 2020)
  - Total: 43,520
  - Density: 157.8/km^{2} (408.6/sq mi)

GDP
  - Total: CHF 2.867 billion (2020)
  - Per capita: CHF 66,209 (2020)
- ISO 3166 code: CH-NW
- Highest point: 2,901 m (9,518 ft): Rotstöckli
- Lowest point: 434 m (1,424 ft): Lake Lucerne
- Joined: 1291
- Languages: German
- Website: www.nw.ch

Canton of Nidwalden or Nidwald (German: Kanton Nidwalden [ˈniːtˌvaldn̩]; Romansh: Chantun Sutsilvania; French: Canton de Nidwald [ni.dwal]; Italian: Canton Nidvaldo) is one of the 26 cantons forming the Swiss Confederation. It is composed of eleven municipalities and the seat of the government and parliament is in Stans. It is traditionally considered a "half-canton", the other half being Obwalden.

Nidwalden lies in Central Switzerland. It borders the canton of Obwalden to the west, the cantons of Lucerne and Schwyz to the north, the canton of Uri to the east and the canton of Bern to the south. The canton is essentially in the Alps, south of Lake Lucerne.

It is one of the smallest cantons, the population is 40,287 (in 2007). The largest town is Stans, followed by Hergiswil and Buochs.

Together with Obwalden, Nidwalden was part of the forest canton of Unterwalden, one of the three participants in the foundation of the Old Swiss Confederacy, named in the Pact of Brunnen of 1315 with Uri and Schwyz. The division of Unterwalden into two separate territories, Obwalden and Nidwalden, appears to develop over the course of the 14th and 15th centuries.

== History ==
The earliest traces of human settlement date to the Neolithic with sites found near Stansstad that are from 4000 to 3100 BC. The same sites, near Stansstad, also contain Late Bronze Age (1400–1100 BC) artifacts, with additional Bronze Age sites near Hergiswil and Ennetmoos. A La Tène (500–100 BC) grave for a 10-year-old girl has been found in Stans. Based on these finds, it appears that the Nidwalden region has been settled since the 1st millennium BC.

During the Roman Empire Ob and Nidwalden were inhabited by a Gallo-Roman or Celtic population. While there are few artifacts from the population, many names of the towns, rivers and mountains have either Celtic or Gallo-Roman roots. By the 8th century the Alemanni entered the valleys of present-day Nidwalden and intermingled. At this time a Roman Catholic church was built in Stans, most likely founded by an Alemanni noble family. The church in Stans would remain until the 10th century when it was replaced by a church in Buochs.

Initially the land was owned by a number of noble families and abbeys. But by the late 13th century the major powers in Nidwalden had shrunk to three: the Habsburgs, Murbach Abbey and Engelberg Abbey. In 1291 Rudolph of Habsburg bought Obwalden from Murbach Abbey. In response the people of Nidwalden (Obwalden joined shortly before the document was signed, the two-halves forming Unterwalden) joined Uri and Schwyz to form an alliance which is considered the foundation of the Old Swiss Confederacy.

At the time there was no state, but towards the end of the 14th century early forms of government were established. This included institutionalized assemblies and courts. In the 14th and 15th century the people of Nidwalden joined the people of Obwalden to discuss important matters, but the two cantons were never really one. For example, Obwalden did not participate in the annexation of Bellinzona, Riviera and Blenio areas (today located in the canton of Ticino).

Under the Helvetic Republic imposed in 1798 by French Revolutionary troops, Switzerland became a united country. The ideas of the French Revolution were not popular in some parts of the Swiss nation including Nidwalden. The cantons were accustomed to self-government and many resented the limits on the freedom of worship in particular. When rebel forces threatened the Republic, Nidwalden was attacked by French troops on 9 September 1798. The canton's infrastructure was badly damaged and at least 400 people were killed.

After the end of Napoleonic rule in 1814, most of the changes were reverted. Only in 1877 did Nidwalden introduce a new constitution. The open assembly (Landsgemeinde) was abolished in 1997.

== Geography ==
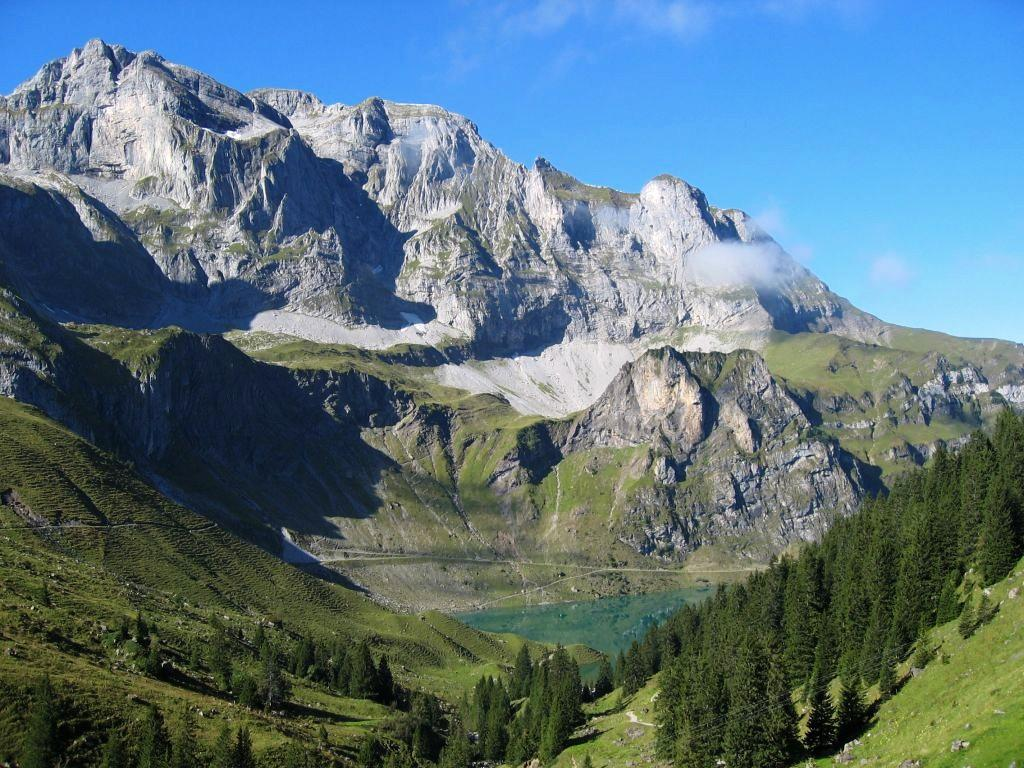
Bannalpsee

Nidwalden is located in the centre of Switzerland. To the north it is bounded by the Lake Lucerne (Vierwaldstättersee), to all other directions by mountain chains (Urner Alps). The area of the canton is 276.1 square kilometers (106.6 sq mi) of which about 40% is inhabited or used for farming. Forests occupy about one third of the canton with about one quarter being considered unproductive (mountains or glaciers).

== Politics ==
=== Federal election results ===
Percentage of the total vote per party in the canton in the Federal Elections 1971–2019
Party	Ideology	1971	1975	1979	1983	1987	1991	1995	1999	2003	2007	2011	2015	2019
FDP.The Liberals^{a}	Classical liberalism	* ^{b}	*	39.0	*	*	*	48.1	90.4	88.5	^{c}	35.2	*	*
CVP/PDC/PPD/PCD	Christian democracy	97.2	97.6	49.5	97.2	96.9	97.7	32.1	*	*	^{c}	*	*	*
SP/PS	Social democracy	*	*	10.6	*	*	*	*	*	*	^{c}	*	*	*
SVP/UDC	Swiss nationalism	*	*	*	*	*	*	*	*	*	^{c}	45.2	82.8	64.2
GPS/PES	Green politics	*	*	*	*	*	*	*	*	*	^{c}	19.6	*	*
SD/DS	National conservatism	*	*	*	*	*	*	*	8.0	10.2	^{c}	*	*	*
Other		2.8	2.4	0.9	2.8	3.1	2.3	19.8	1.6	1.2	^{c}	*	17.2	35.8
Voter participation %		51.3	38.9	59.7	29.5	23.4	23.6	58.9	46.0	39.4	^{c}	60.9	58.3	50.4

^a FDP before 2009, FDP.The Liberals after 2009
^b "*" indicates that the party was not on the ballot in this canton.
^c No election held

=== Cantonal election ===
The cantonal executive (Regierungsrat) is composed of seven members. The local parliament has 60 seats. Nidwalden sends only one deputy to the Swiss Council of States.

=== Climate and energy policy ===
WWF rating: 1.9 ("blocked")

The World Wildlife Fund commissioned a study into the energy policies of all Swiss cantons . No canton was given the highest possible rating of 6, and Nidwalden came out with one of the lowest in the country, above only Zug and Schwyz. Six indicators were used for the assessment, namely cantonal goals, energy efficiency requirements, renewable energy regulations, financial subsidies, energy planning of the individual municipalities, and the Gebäudeenergieausweis. The highest rating can only be given to cantons which are on their way to meeting the requirements of the Paris Agreement in each area.

== Municipalities ==
There are eleven municipalities: Beckenried, Buochs, Dallenwil, Emmetten, Ennetbürgen, Ennetmoos, Hergiswil, Oberdorf, Stans, Stansstad and Wolfenschiessen. The capital is Stans.

== Demographics ==
The population of the canton (as of 31 December 2020) is 43,520. As of 2007, the population included 4,046 foreigners, or about 10% of the total population. By gender, the canton is nearly evenly split with 50.9% male and 49.1% female. In 2000, 75.6% of the population identified as Catholic while 11.9% belong to the Swiss Reformed Church. The population density in December 2005 was 144.3 persons per km^{2}. Most of the population (as of 2000) speaks German (92.5%) with a small minority speaking Italian (1.4%) or Serbo-Croatian (1.2%).

=== Historical population ===
The historical population is given in the following table:

Historic Population Data
Year	Total Population	Swiss	Non-Swiss	Population share of total country
1850	11 339	11 307	32	0.5%
1880	11 979	11 712	267	0.4%
1900	13 070	12 470	600	0.4%
1950	19 389	18 832	557	0.4%
1970	25 634	23 278	2 356	0.4%
2000	37 235	33 625	3 610	0.5%
2020	43 520			0.5%

== Economy ==
Up to the 20th century Nidwalden was dominated by agriculture. Cattle and cheese were exported mainly to northern Italy. Around 1500, many people in Nidwalden worked as mercenary soldiers.

From the middle of the 19th century onwards, trade, industry and tourism gained momentum. Nevertheless, until the middle of the 20th century, agriculture dominated the canton. Today a great number of small and middle-sized businesses dominate the economy. The largest employer is the airplane constructor Pilatus. The small and middle-sized businesses work in a wide range of areas. Many specialize in machine construction, medical equipment, international trade, optics and electronics.

Traditional areas such as forestry and agriculture are still of importance. Agriculture is specialized in cattle and dairy farming. The farms are still run by individual families.

In recent years, Nidwalden is becoming an increasingly common place to live and work. This is caused by its low taxes, its central location between Zürich and Milan, and its natural environment.

=== Tourism ===
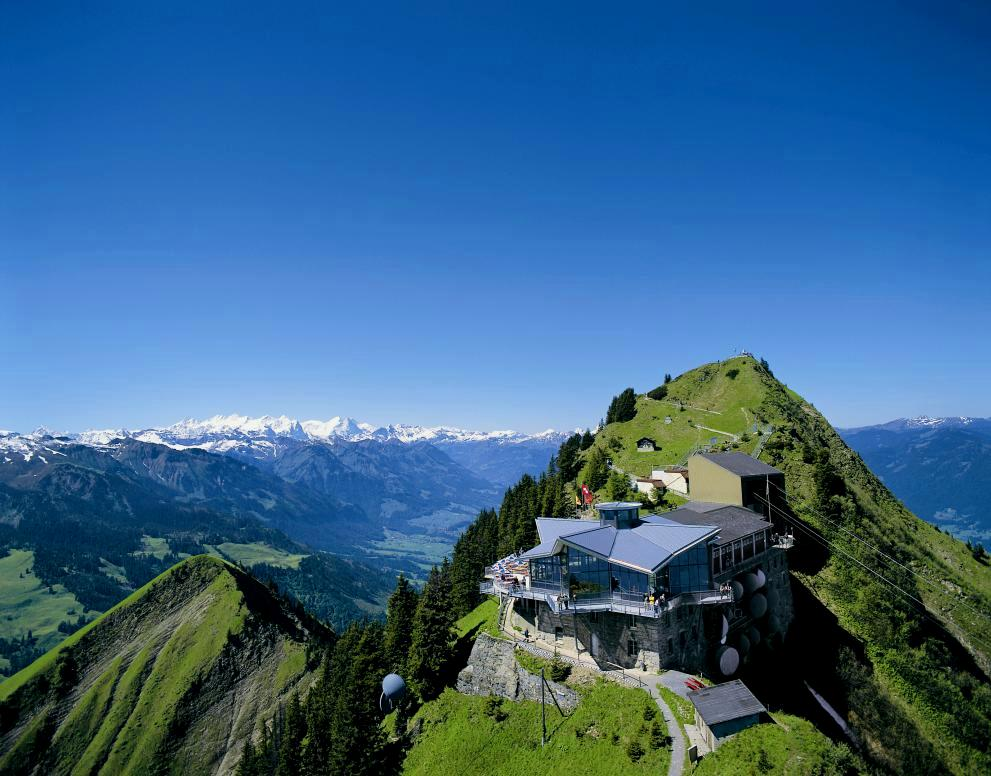
Peak of the Stanserhorn showing the restaurant and cable car

Because of its mountainous geography, tourism is important in Nidwalden. The lake and the mountains attract many tourists, both during the winter and the summer. Major resorts include Klewenalp, Stanserhorn (mountain), the region around Bannalp, and Bürgenstock.

== Culture ==
Traditional culture in Nidwalden has been kept alive by many local organisations. There is traditional music, yodeling, dances, theaters and festivals. There are also a number of modern cultural events, such a concerts and galleries.
