= Wissigstock =

Mountain in Switzerland

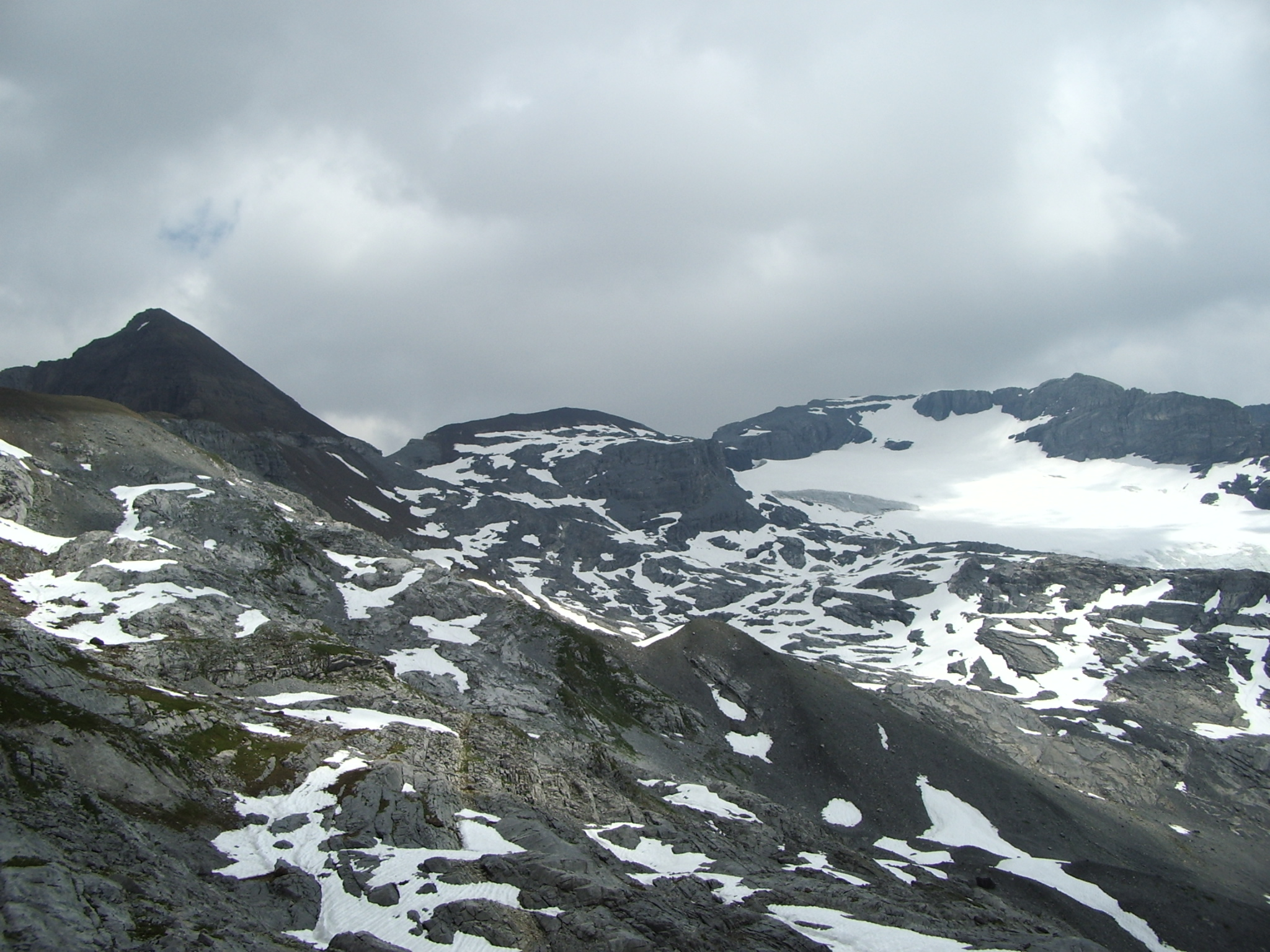
- Wissigstock (right)

Highest point
- Elevation: 2,887 m (9,472 ft)
- Prominence: 329 m (1,079 ft)
- Parent peak: Brunnistock
- Listing: Alpine mountains 2500-2999 m
- Coordinates: 46°50′44″N 8°30′23.4″E

Geography
- Location within Switzerland
- Location: Obwalden/Uri, Switzerland
- Parent range: Urner Alps

The Wissigstock is a mountain of the Urner Alps. It lies on the border between the Swiss cantons of Obwalden and Uri. The closest locality is Engelberg on the west side.
