= Wolfenschiessen =

- Municipality
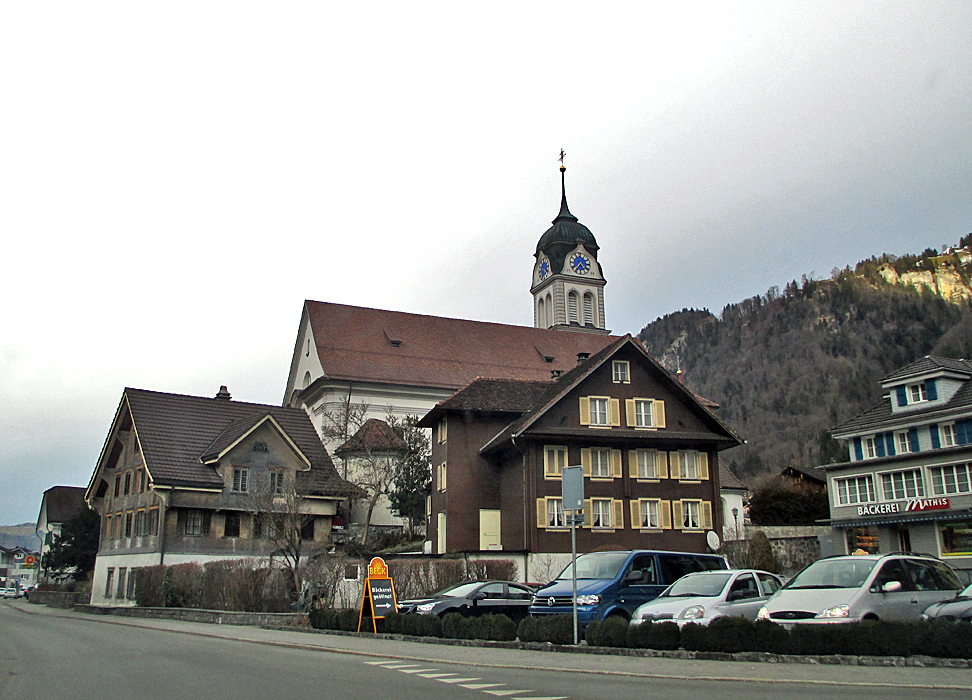

- Flag Coat of arms
- Location of Wolfenschiessen
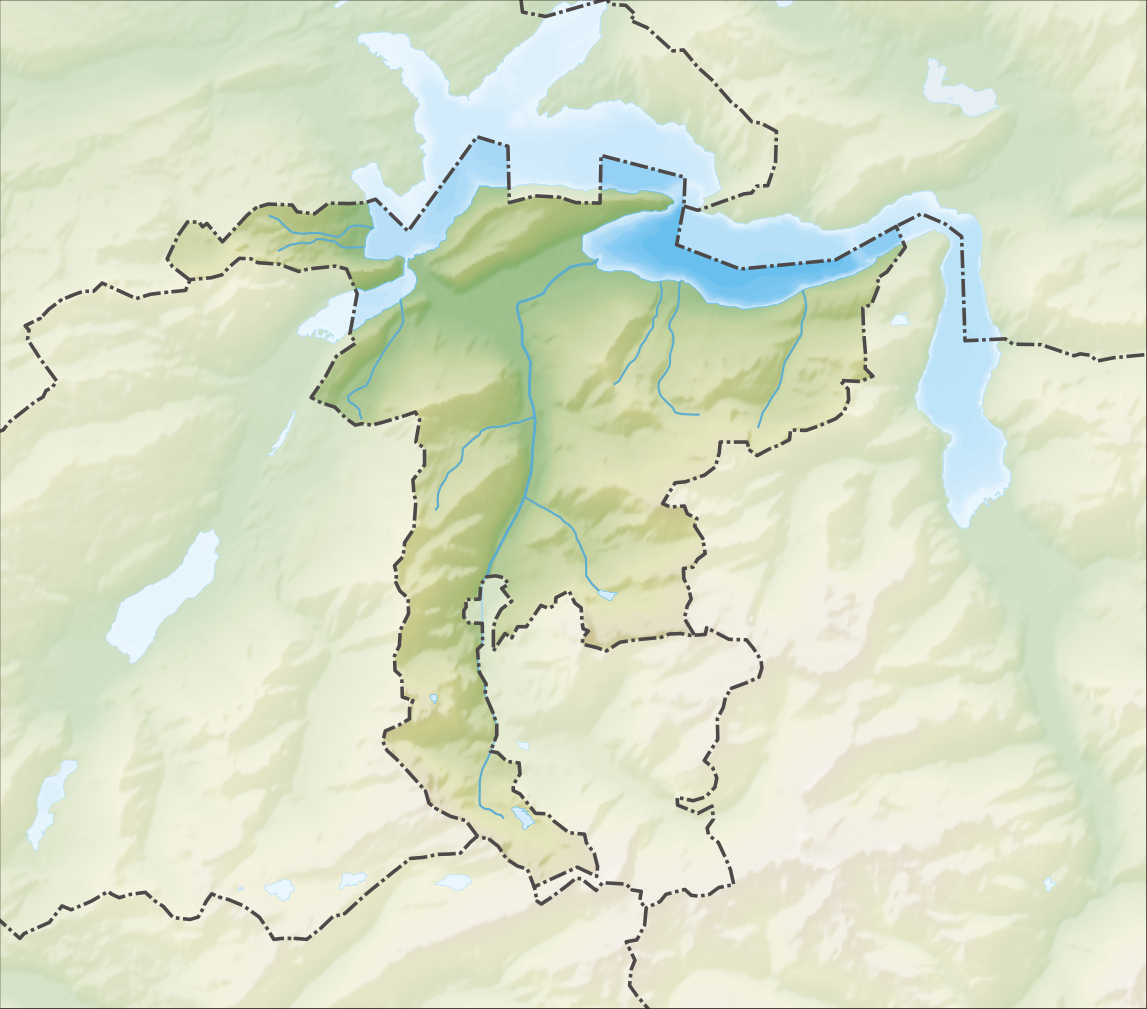
- Location within Switzerland Location within Canton of Nidwalden
- Coordinates: 46°54′N 8°23′E
- Country: Switzerland
- Canton: Nidwalden
- District: n.a.

Area
  - Total: 92.76 km^{2} (35.81 sq mi)
- Elevation (Wolfenschiessen village): 510 m (1,670 ft)
- Highest elevation (Titlis Glacier): 2,880 m (9,450 ft)
- Lowest elevation (Niederrickenbach Station): 488 m (1,601 ft)

Population (Dec 2016)
  - Total: 2,136
  - Density: 23.03/km^{2} (59.64/sq mi)
- Time zone: UTC+01:00 (CET)
  - Summer (DST): UTC+02:00 (CEST)
- Postal code: 6386
- SFOS number: 1511
- ISO 3166 code: CH-NW
- Surrounded by: Beckenried, Dallenwil, Engelberg (OW), Innertkirchen (BE), Isenthal (UR), Kerns (OW), Oberdorf
- Website: www.wolfenschiessen.ch

Wolfenschiessen is a village and municipality in the canton of Nidwalden in Switzerland. Besides the village of Wolfenschiessen itself, the municipality includes the settlements of Altzellen, Büren ob dem Bach, Dörfli, and Oberrickenbach, together with a large area of high alpine land, mountains, lakes, and glaciers.

== History ==
Wolfenschiessen was first mentioned around 1200 as Wolvinscizin though a 14th-century copy of a land record from around 1160 mentions two fields at Wolfenschiessen. During the 12th century the farm and fields of Wolfenschiessen were owned by the Benedictine Muri Abbey. In the 13th and 14th centuries the lands were gradually transferred to Murbach-Lucerne and Engelberg Abbeys. Between the 12th and 13th centuries, the von Wolfenschiessen family were, probably, raised from farming to minor nobility and appointed to administer the monastery’s estates at Wolfenschiessen. They built a tower in the center of the village from which they administered and ruled over the village and farms. The family eventually grew to local prominence, before losing most of their wealth and status in the 15th century and dying out at the beginning of the 17th century.

A village church was built by 1277 but was initially a filial church of the parish church in Stans. The village received its own priest in 1438 and in 1469 became an independent parish. During the 14th through 16th centuries several other hamlets developed around Wolfenschiessen.

== Coat of arms ==
The municipality's coat of arms is Azure, a Wolf rampant Argent pierced by an Arrow in bend sinister Or. This is an example of canting where the name of the municipality is translated or represented on the coat of arms. In this case, Wolfenschiessen means "to shoot the wolf."

== Geography ==
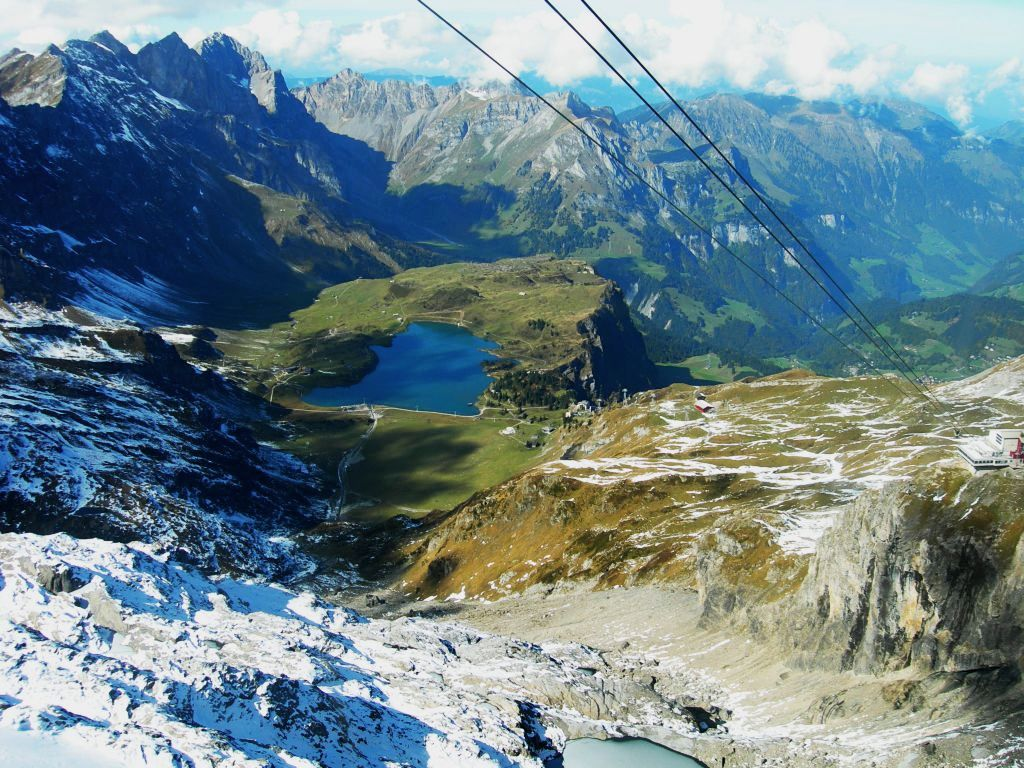
Looking down from the summit of Titlis over the Trüebsee into the valley of the Engelberger Aa. Wolfenschiessen village is in the deepest part of the valley, in the top right corner of the image.

Aerial view by Walter Mittelholzer (1933)

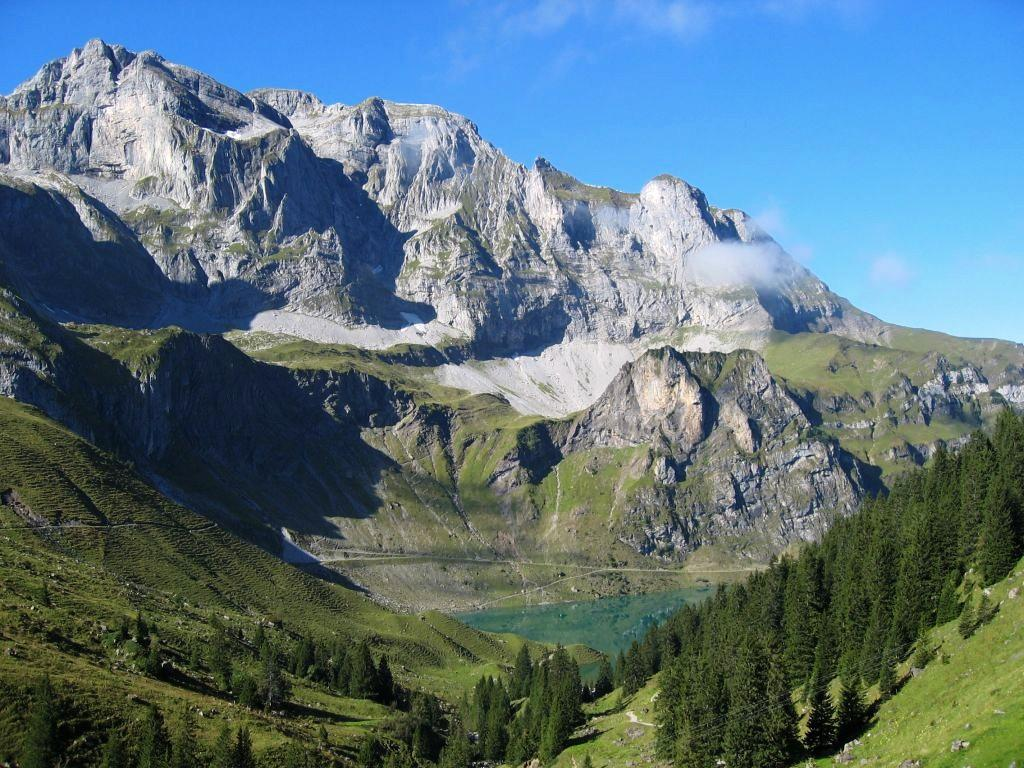
The Bannalpsee

Wolfenschiessen encompasses both sides of the deep valley of the river Engelberger Aa downstream of Engelberg, with high alpine areas encircling Engelberg to the north, west, and south. The settlements of Wolfenschiessen, Büren ob dem Bach and Dörfli lie in the valley, whilst Altzellen and Oberrickenbach are on higher ground to the east.

The lake Bannalpsee lies above Oberrickenbach to the north of Engelberg, while the Trüebsee is on high ground to the south of Engelberg. The southernmost part of the municipality reaches high up the flank of the Titlis, including part of the Titlis Glacier (Titlisgletscher).

Wolfenschiessen has an area, (as of the 2004/09 survey) of 92.7 km^{2} (35.79 sq mi). Of this area, about 39.6% is used for agricultural purposes, while 33.6% is forested. Of the rest of the land, 1.4% is settled (buildings or roads) and 25.4% is unproductive land. In the 2004/09 survey a total of 61 ha (150 acres) or about 0.7% of the total area was covered with buildings, an increase of 16 ha (40 acres) over the 1980/81 amount. Of the agricultural land, 9 ha (22 acres) is used for orchards and vineyards, 959 ha (2,370 acres) is fields and grasslands and 3,006 ha (7,430 acres) consists of alpine grazing areas. Since 1980/81 the amount of agricultural land has decreased by 130 ha (320 acres). Over the same period, the amount of forested land has increased by 50 ha (120 acres). Rivers and lakes cover 128 ha (320 acres) in the municipality.

== Demographics ==
Wolfenschiessen has a population (as of December 2020) of 2,115. As of 2015, 10.8% of the population are resident foreign nationals. Over the last 5 years (2010-2015) the population has changed at a rate of 7.13%. The birth rate in the municipality, in 2015, was 14.1, while the death rate was 4.7 per thousand residents.

As of 2015, children and teenagers (0–19 years old) make up 24.4% of the population, while adults (20–64 years old) are 60.6% of the population, and seniors (over 64 years old) make up 15.0%. In 2015 there were 1,019 single residents, 952 people who were married or in a civil partnership, 91 widows or widowers, and 86 divorced residents.

In 2015 there were 819 private households in Wolfenschiessen with an average household size of 2.59 persons. In 2015 about 41.4% of all buildings in the municipality were single-family homes, which is greater than the percentage in the canton (35.5%) but is much less than the percentage nationally (57.4%). Of the 416 inhabited buildings in the municipality, in 2000, about 39.9% were single family homes and 26.2% were multiple family buildings. Additionally, about 31.5% of the buildings were built before 1919, while 15.1% were built between 1991 and 2000. In 2014 the rate of construction of new housing units per 1000 residents was 2.37. The vacancy rate for the municipality, in 2016, was 1.71%.

Most of the population (as of 2000) speaks German (93.6%), with Albanian being second most common (2.7%) and Serbo-Croatian being third (1.4%). As of 2008 the gender distribution of the population was 51.7% male and 48.3% female.

The historical population is given in the following chart:

== Politics ==
In the 2015 federal election the only major party which ran in Nidwalden was the SVP which received 88.7% of the vote in Wolfenschiessen. In the federal election, a total of 901 votes were cast, and the voter turnout was 58.1%.

In the 2011 federal election the SVP received 57.2%, while the FDP got 29.7% and the GPS received the remaining 13.1%.

In the 2007 federal election the most popular party was the FDP which received 89.3% of the vote. The next two most popular parties were the local, small right-wing parties (10.7%) and the SPS (0.1%).

== Education ==
In Wolfenschiessen about 58.6% of the population (between age 25-64) have completed either non-mandatory upper secondary education or additional higher education (either university or a Fachhochschule).

== Economy ==
Wolfenschiessen is a mixed agro-industrial community, a municipality where agriculture and manufacturing play a significant role in the economy.

As of 2014, there were a total of 870 people employed in the municipality. Of these, a total of 229 people worked in 86 businesses in the primary economic sector. The secondary sector employed 267 workers in 31 separate businesses, of which 6 were small businesses that employed a total of 162 employees. Finally, the tertiary sector provided 374 jobs in 91 businesses.

In 2015 a total of 2.4% of the population received social assistance. In 2011 the unemployment rate in the municipality was 0.8%.

In 2015 local hotels had a total of 22,642 overnight stays, of which 33.5% were international visitors.

In 2015 the average cantonal, municipal, and church tax rate in the municipality for a couple with two children making SFr 80,000 was 3.8% while the rate for a single person making SFr 150,000 was 13.5%, both of which are much higher than the average for the canton. The canton has a slightly lower than average tax rate for those making SFr 80,000 and one of the lowest for those making SFr 150,000. In 2013 the average income in the municipality per taxpayer was SFr 63,647 and the per person average was SFr 22,569, which is less than the cantonal average of SFr 98,342 and SFr 46,206 respectively. It is also less than the national per taxpayer average of SFr 82,682 and the per person average of SFr 35,825.

== Transport ==
The municipality of Wolfenschiessen is served by two railway stations on the Luzern–Stans–Engelberg line. Besides Wolfenschiessen itself, there is Niederrickenbach station, a request stop, to the north. The former Dörfli station to the south was closed in 2013. The hourly InterRegio service between Luzern and Engelberg stops at both stations, while the half hourly S4 service from Luzern terminates at Wolfenschiessen.

A Swiss PostBus service within the municipality links the villages of Wolfenschiessen and Oberrickenbach, with eight services per day. From Oberrickenbach, a cable car provides access to the Bannalpsee. Many other cable cars provide access to higher dwellings, farms, and tourist destinations on both sides of the valley.

On the Alpine pasture of Ober Trüebsee one finds the lake called Trüebsee (lit.: "dull lake"). At its uttermost east end is also the place of an intermediate stop (Trübsee, Germanized without 'e') on the cable car system that links Engelberg and the summit of Klein Titlis.

== Sights ==
The main sights of Wolfenschiessen are the St. Maria parish church, the St. Joder chapel in Altzellen, and the Hechhuis and Grossitz mansions.

== Heritage sites of national significance ==
The farmhouses Grossitz at Hauptstrasse 31 and Unteres Brunnifeld at Hauptstrasse 41, the Hechhuis or Lussyhaus mansion, and the house Hofstatt im Dörfli are all listed as Swiss heritage site of national significance.

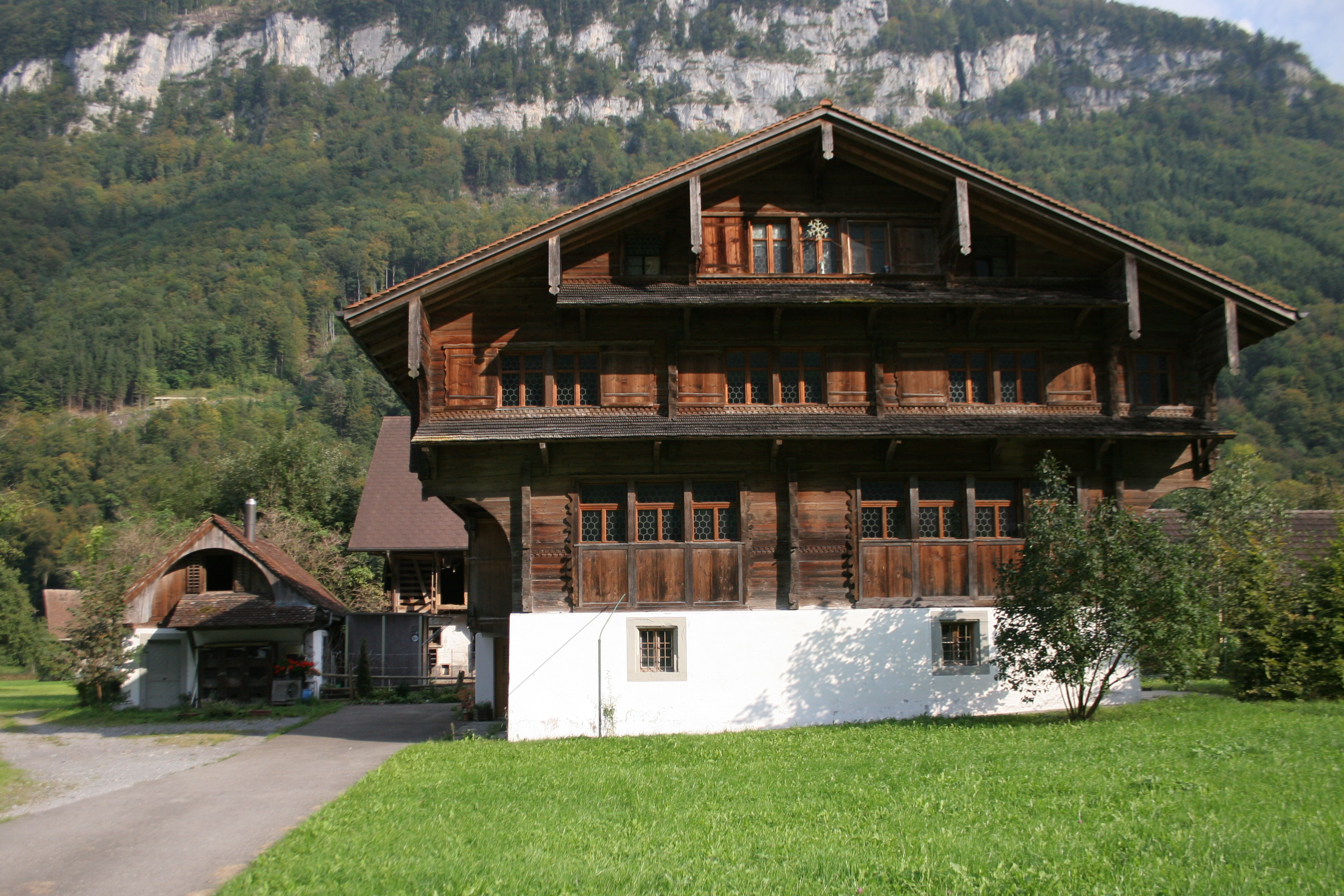
Grossitz farm house

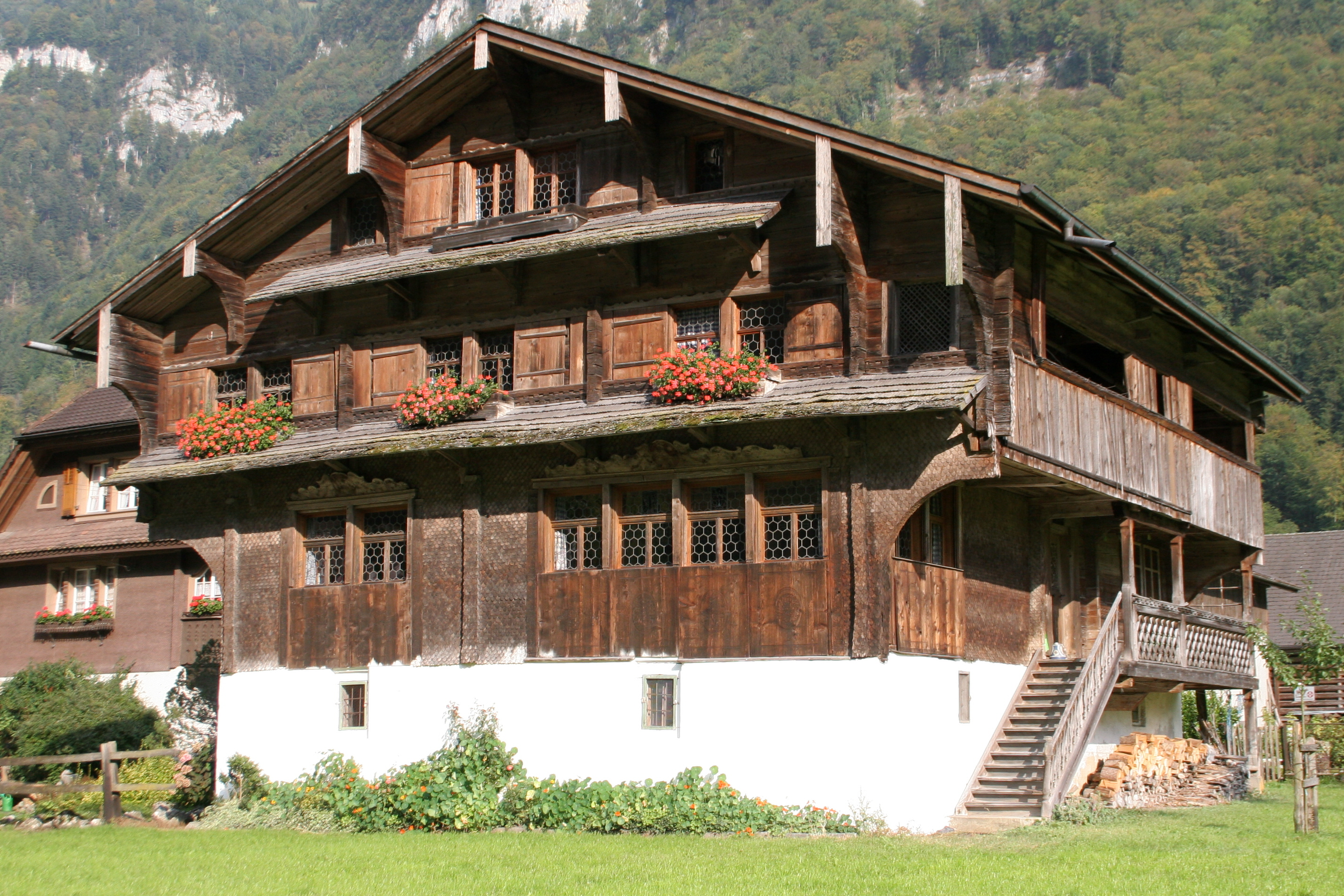
Unteres Brunnifeld farm house

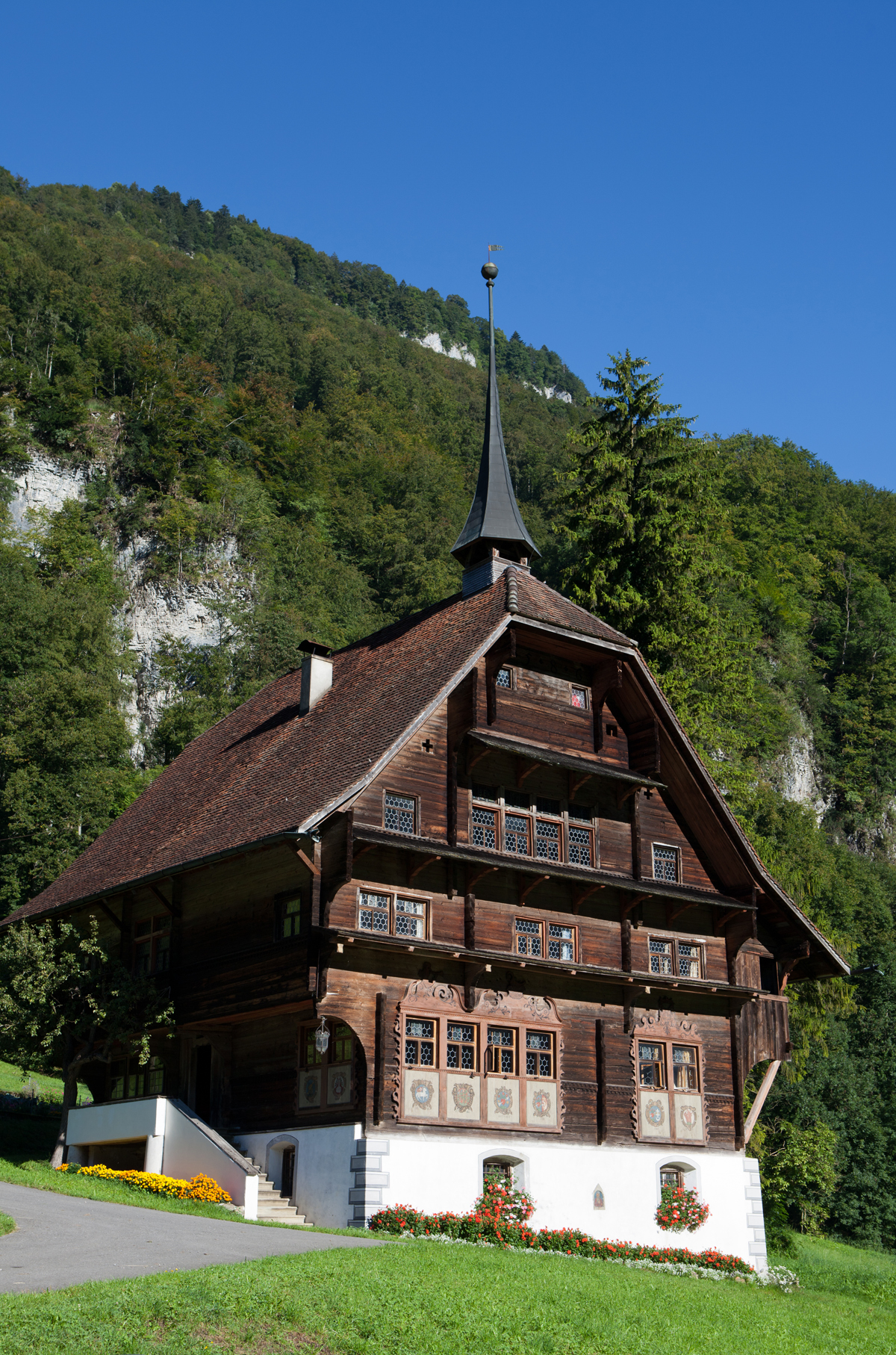
The Hechhuis mansion

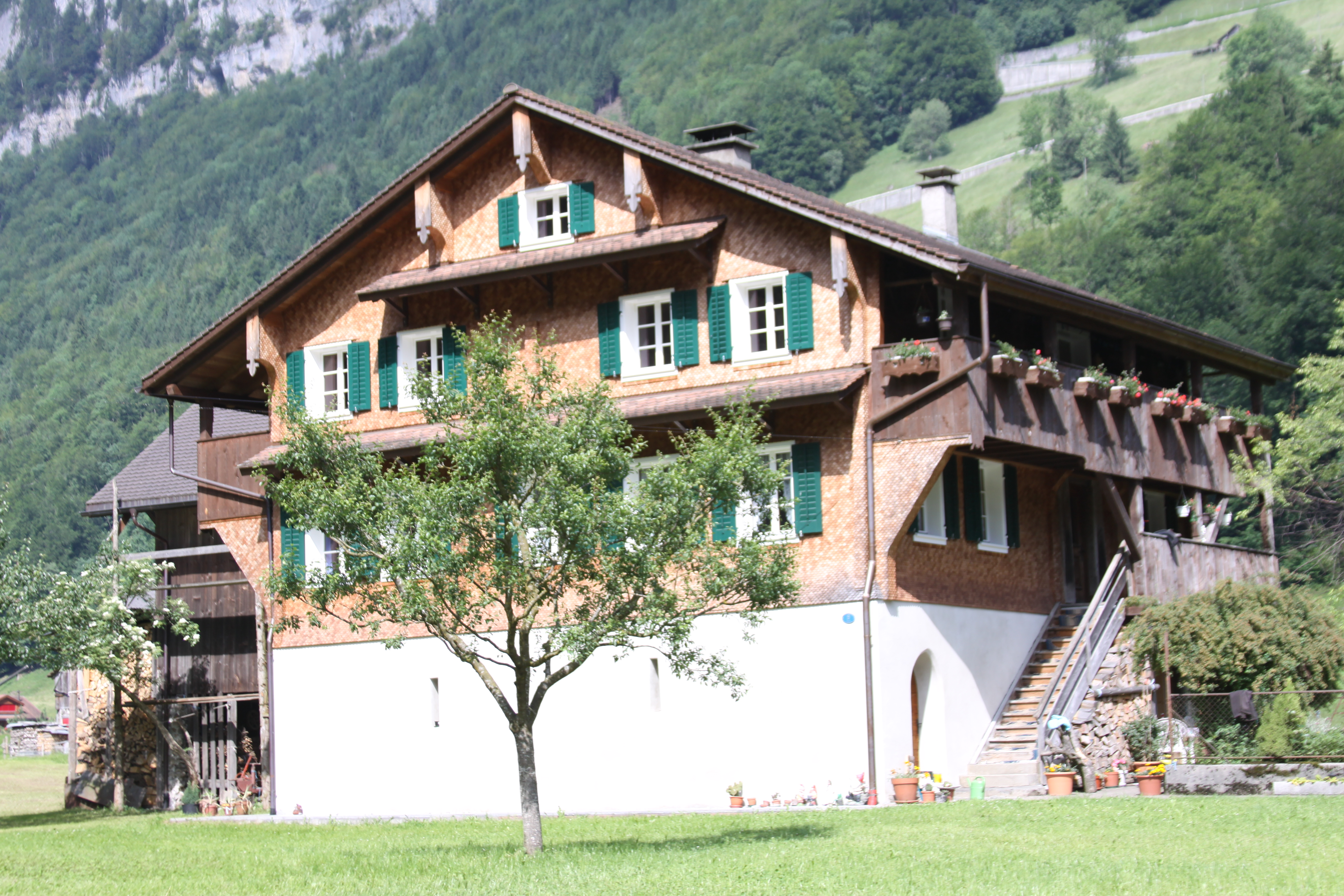
Hofstatt im Dörfli

== Gallery ==
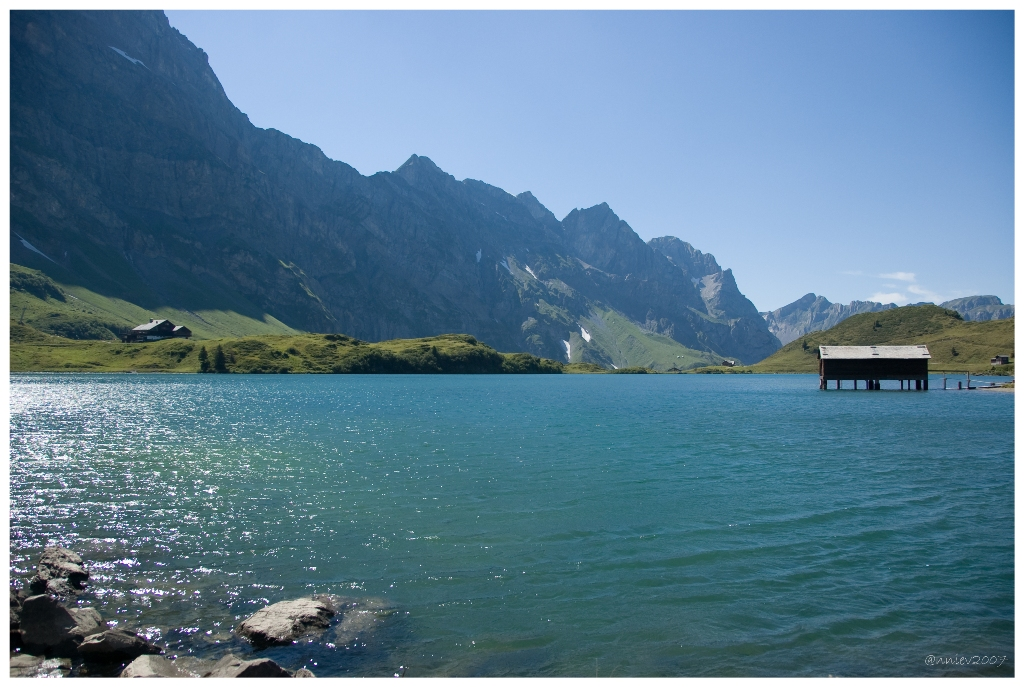
Trüebsee in summer

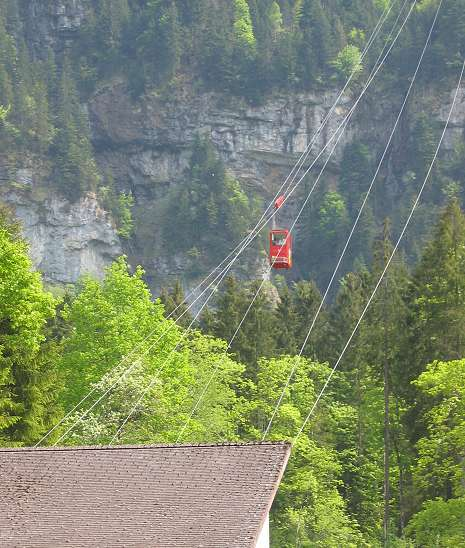
Cable car from Oberrickenbach up to the Bannalpsee

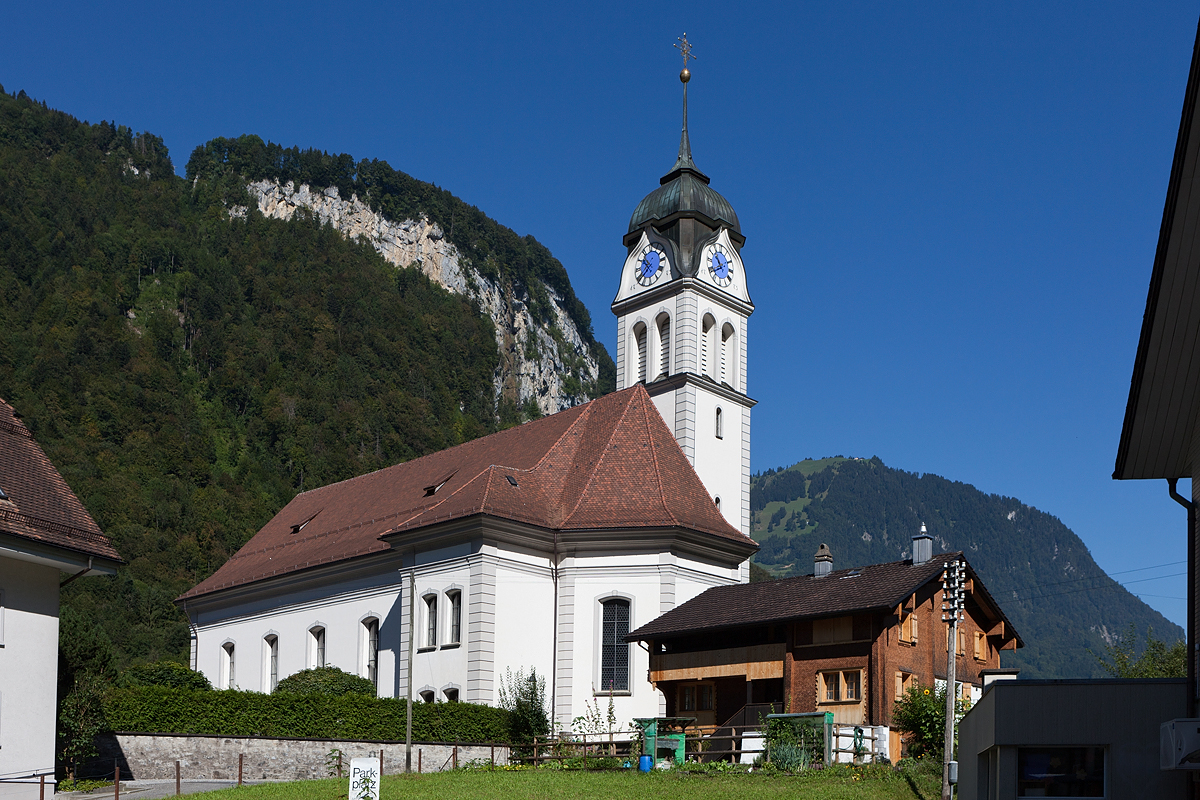
The Pfarrkirche Maria Geburt church

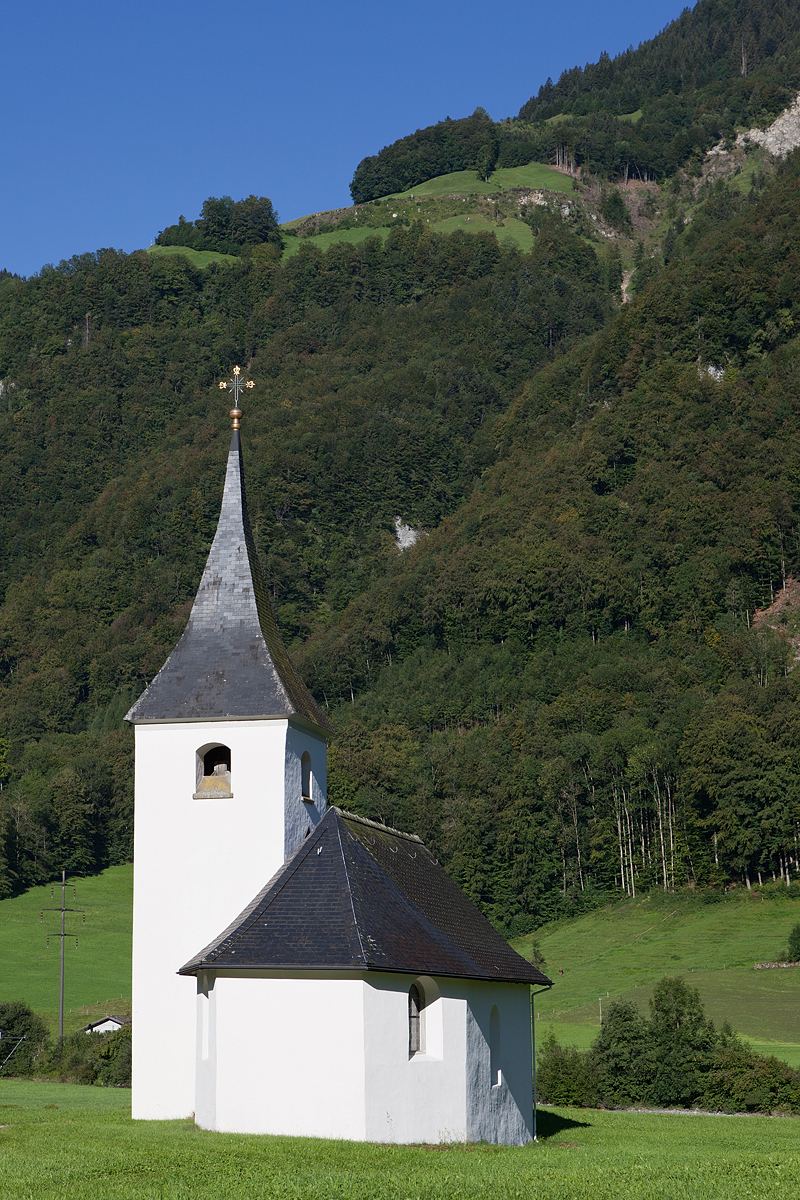
St. Joder chapel
