= Bannalpsee =

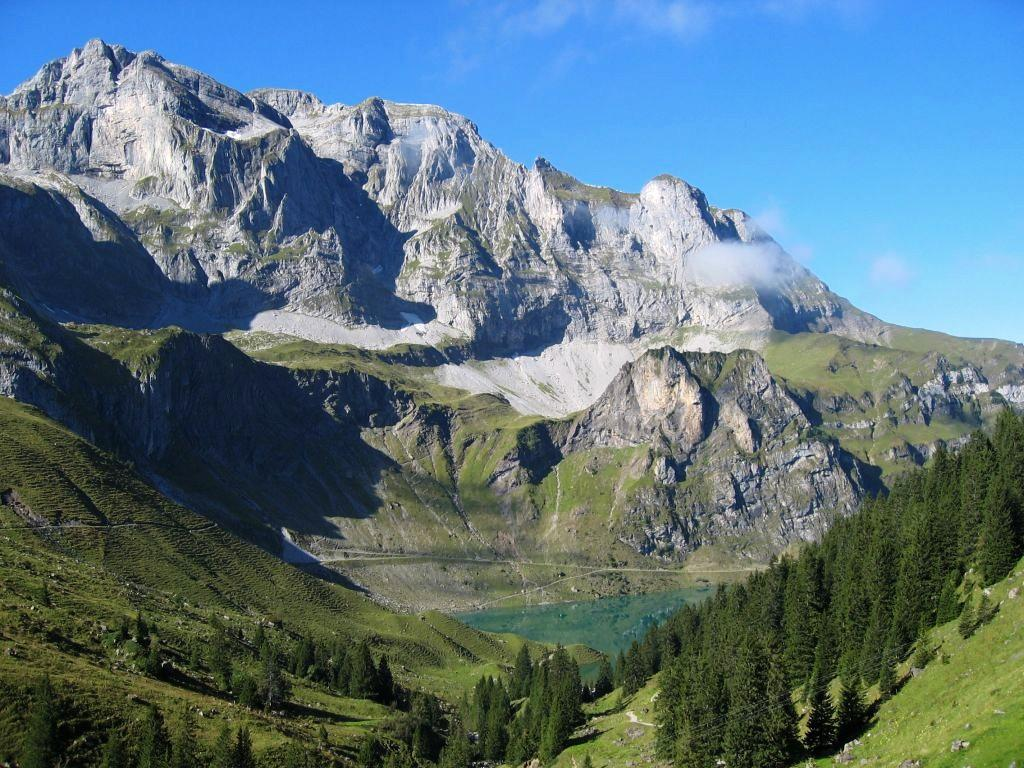

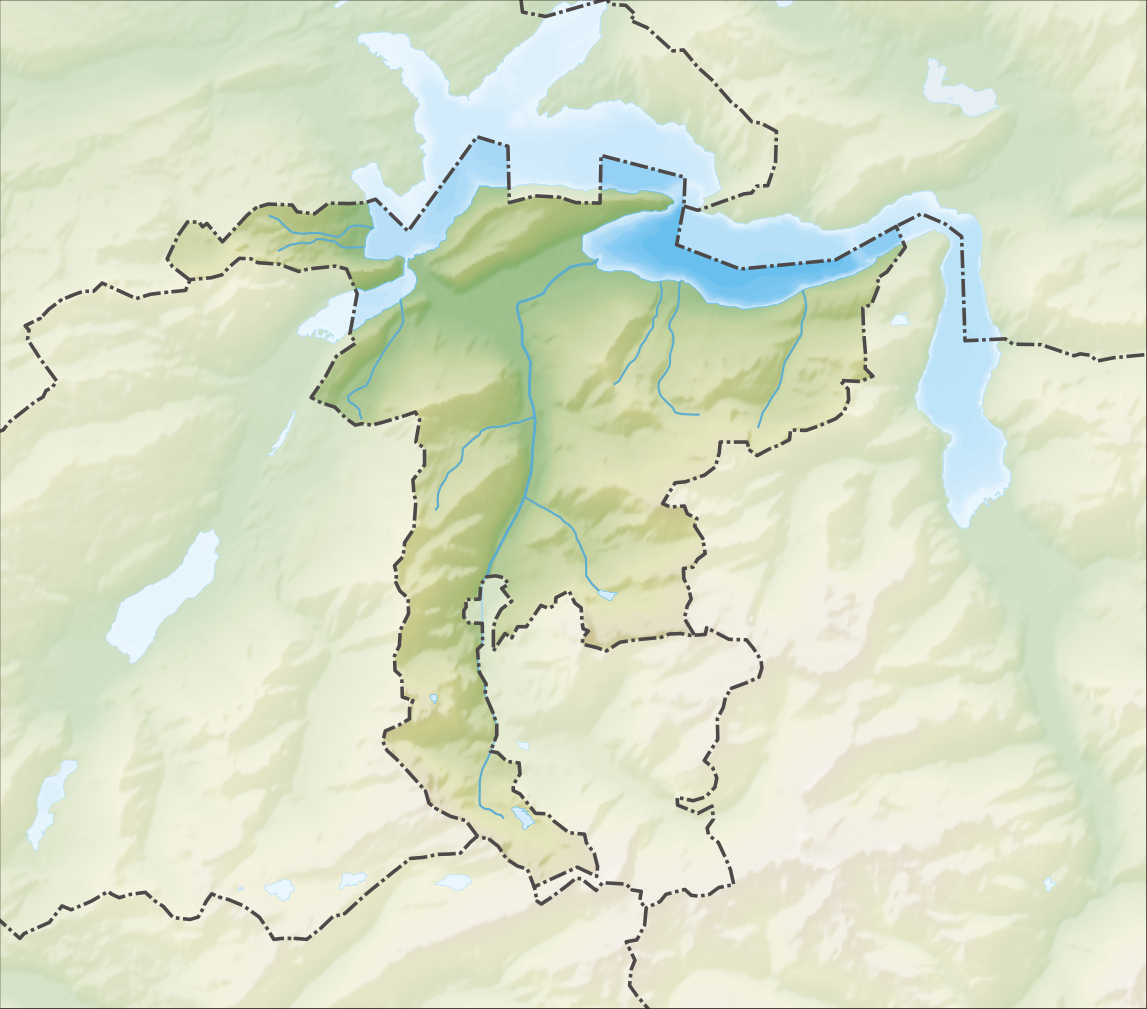
- Location within Canton of Nidwalden Location within Switzerland Location within Alps
- Interactive map of Bannalpsee
- Location: Nidwalden
- Coordinates: 46°52′06″N 8°25′44″E
- Type: reservoir
- Catchment area: 8.16 km^{2} (3.15 sq mi)
- Basin countries: Switzerland
- Surface area: 16 ha (40 acres)
- Water volume: 1.7 million cubic metres (1,400 acre⋅ft)

Bannalpsee is a reservoir in the municipality of Wolfenschiessen in the Swiss canton of Nidwalden.

The reservoir's surface area is 16 hectares (40 acres). The construction of the reservoir was decided in 1934 and completed in 1937. The reservoir is operated by Elektrizitätswerk Nidwalden.

The lake can be reached by a cable car from Oberrickenbach, which in turn is linked by post bus service to Wolfenschiessen station on the Luzern–Stans–Engelberg railway line.

== See also ==
- List of mountain lakes of Switzerland
