= Stans railway station =

Railway station in Switzerland

Stans
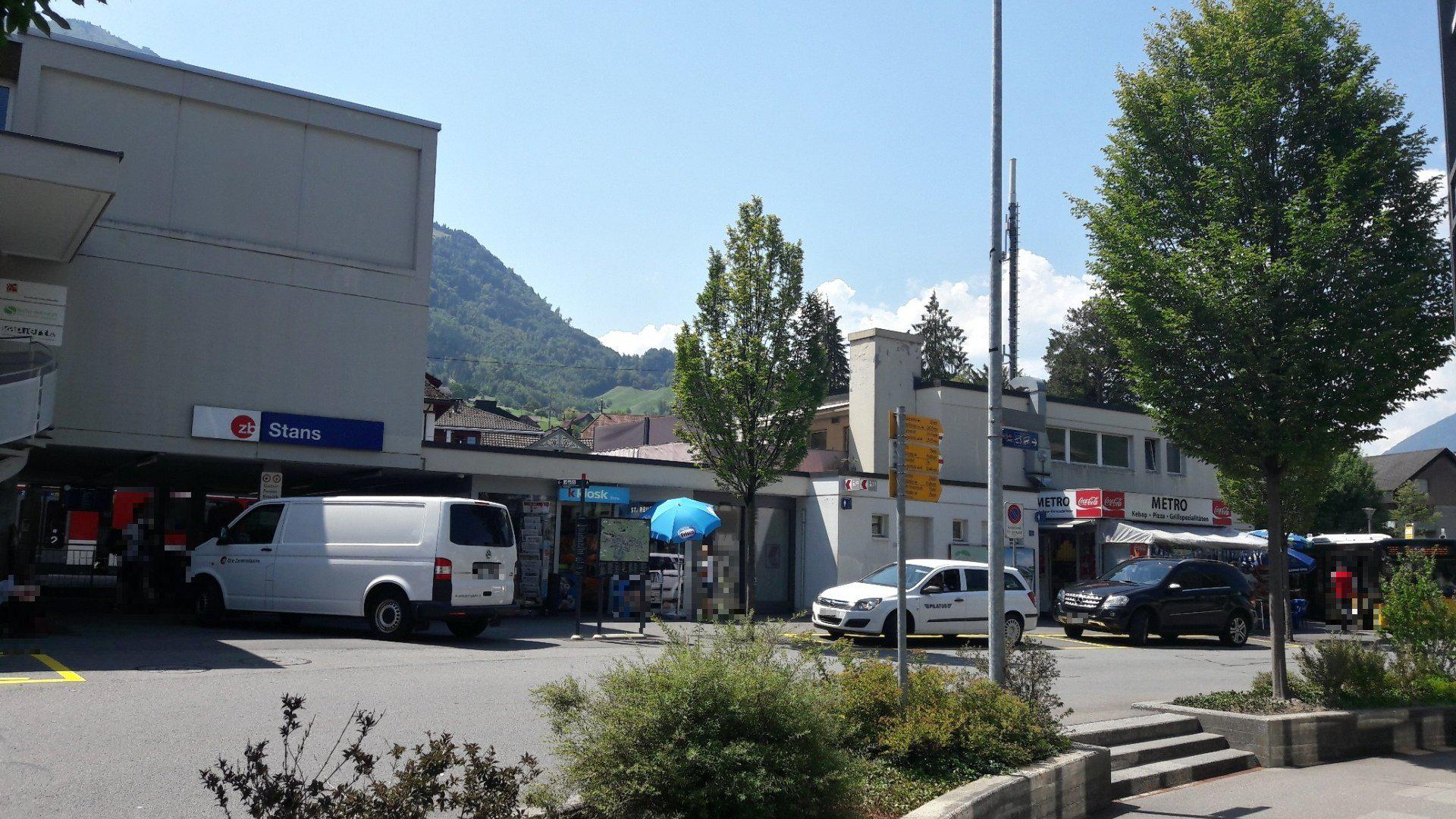
- The station building in 2018

General information
- Location: Bahnhofplatz; Stans; Switzerland
- Coordinates: 46°57′30″N 8°22′00″E
- Elevation: 451 m (1,480 ft)
- Owner: Zentralbahn
- Line: Luzern–Stans–Engelberg line
- Train operators: Zentralbahn

Services
Preceding station	Zentralbahn	Following station
Dallenwil towards Engelberg	InterRegio Luzern-Engelberg Express	Lucerne Terminus
Preceding station	Lucerne S-Bahn	Following station
Dallenwil towards Wolfenschiessen	S4	Stansstad towards Lucerne
Terminus	S44	Stansstad towards Lucerne
Location
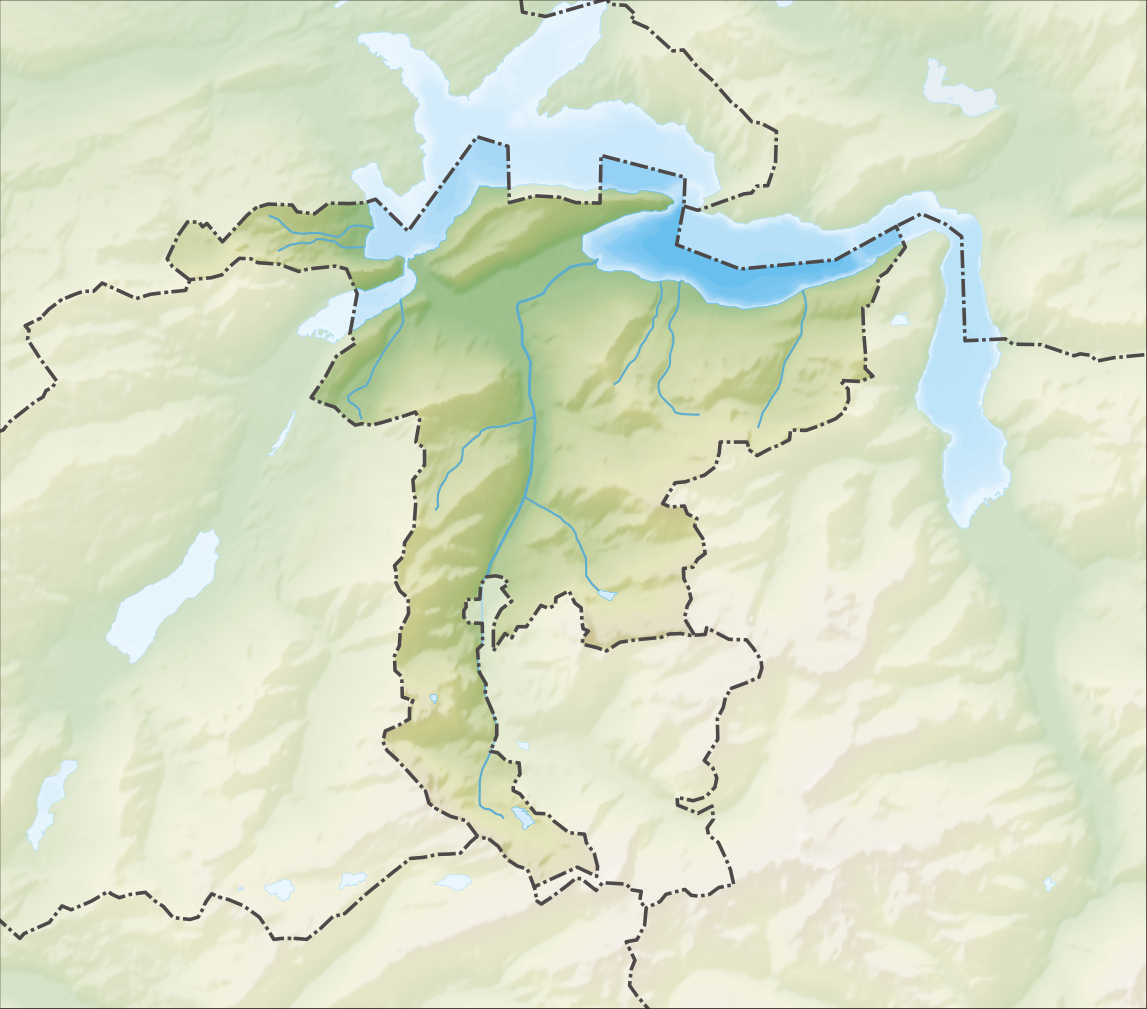
- Location within Switzerland Location within Canton of Nidwalden

Stans is a Swiss railway station in the municipality of Stans in the canton of Nidwalden. It is on the Luzern–Stans–Engelberg line, owned by the Zentralbahn railway company.

== Services ==
The following services stop at Stans:

- InterRegio Luzern-Engelberg Express: hourly service between Lucerne and Engelberg.
- Lucerne S-Bahn:
  - S4: half-hourly service to Lucerne and hourly service to Wolfenschiessen.
  - S44: rush-hour service to Lucerne.
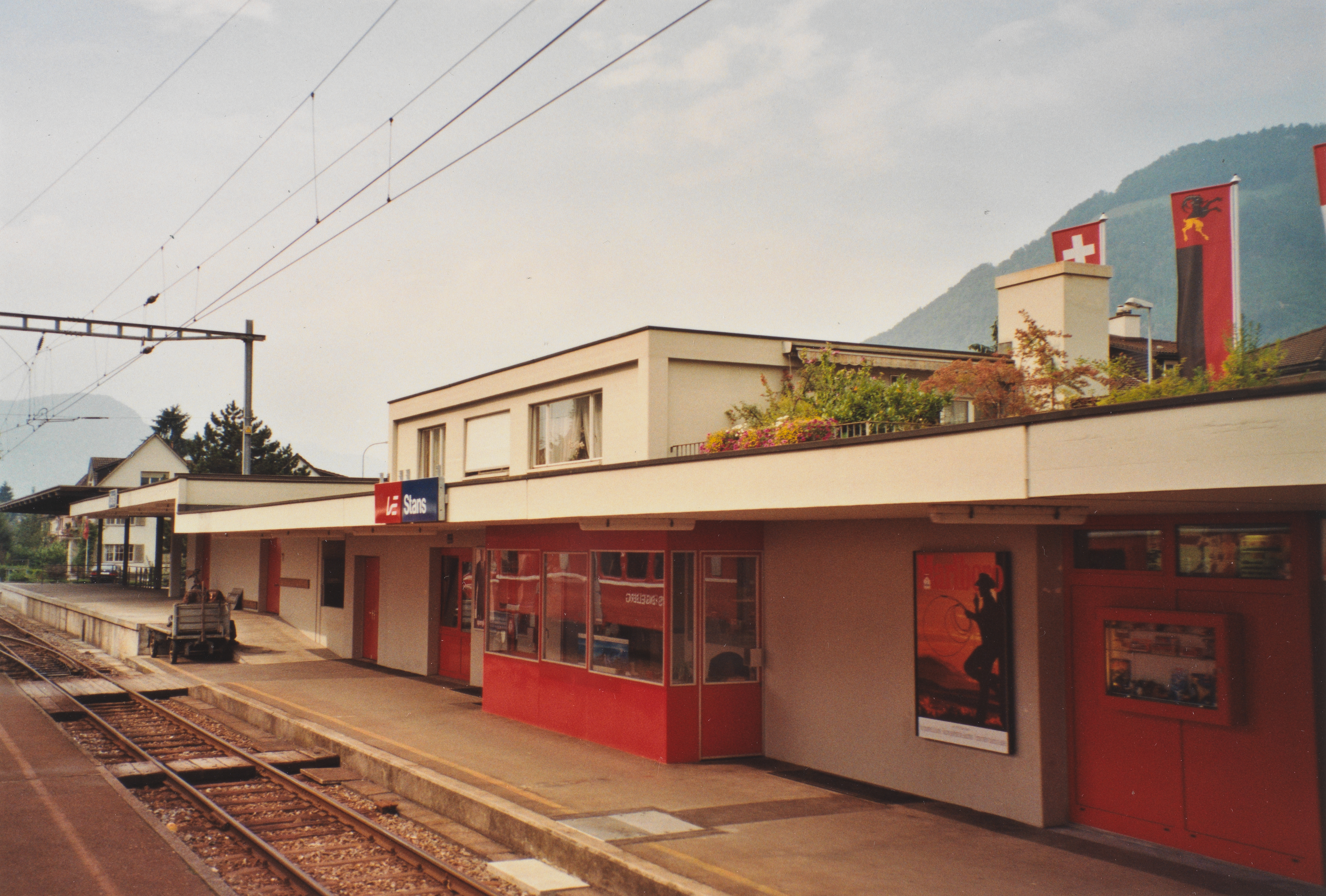
station building (1999)

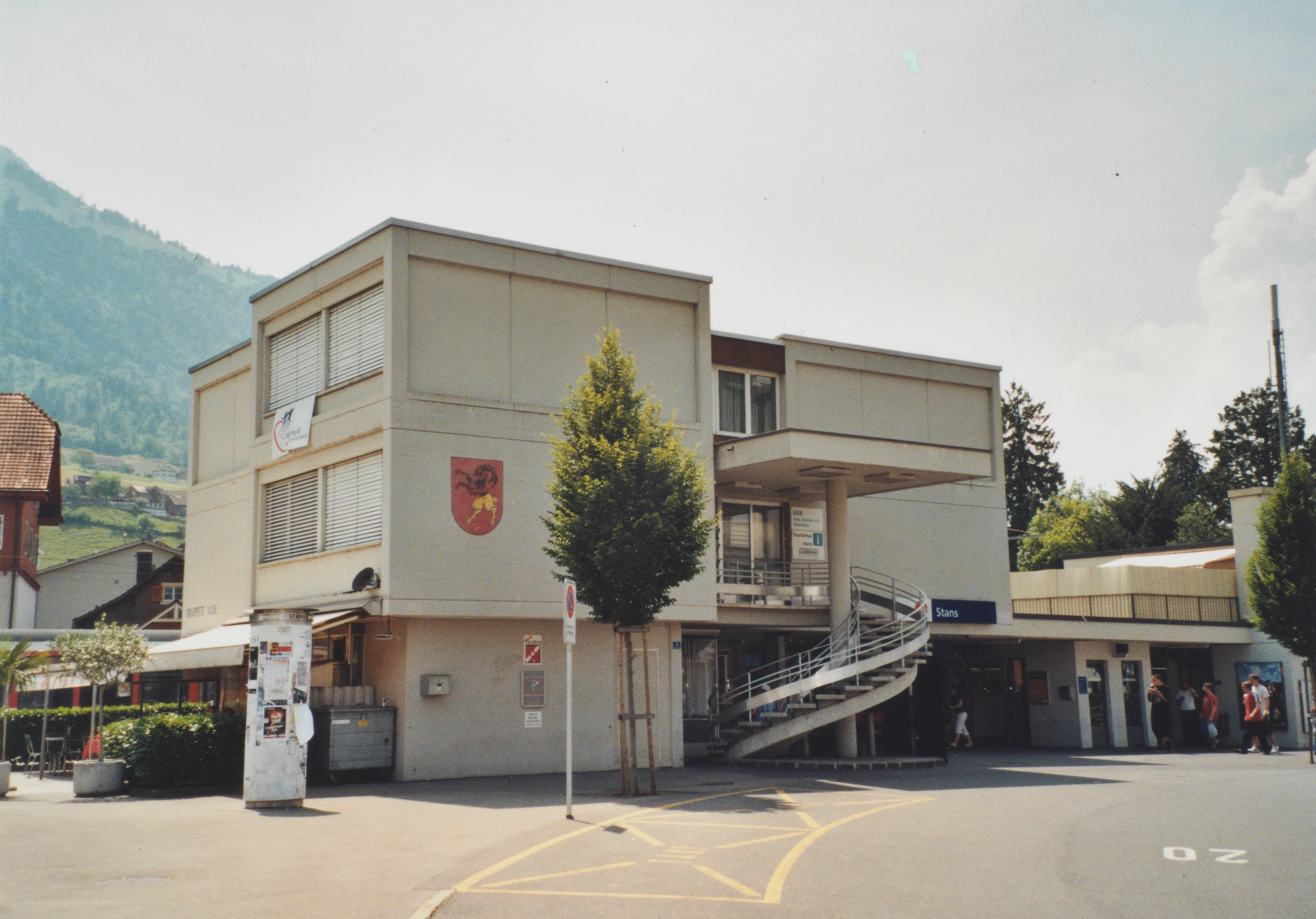
station building (2010)
