= Niederrickenbach Station railway station =

Railway station in Switzerland

Niederrickenbach Station
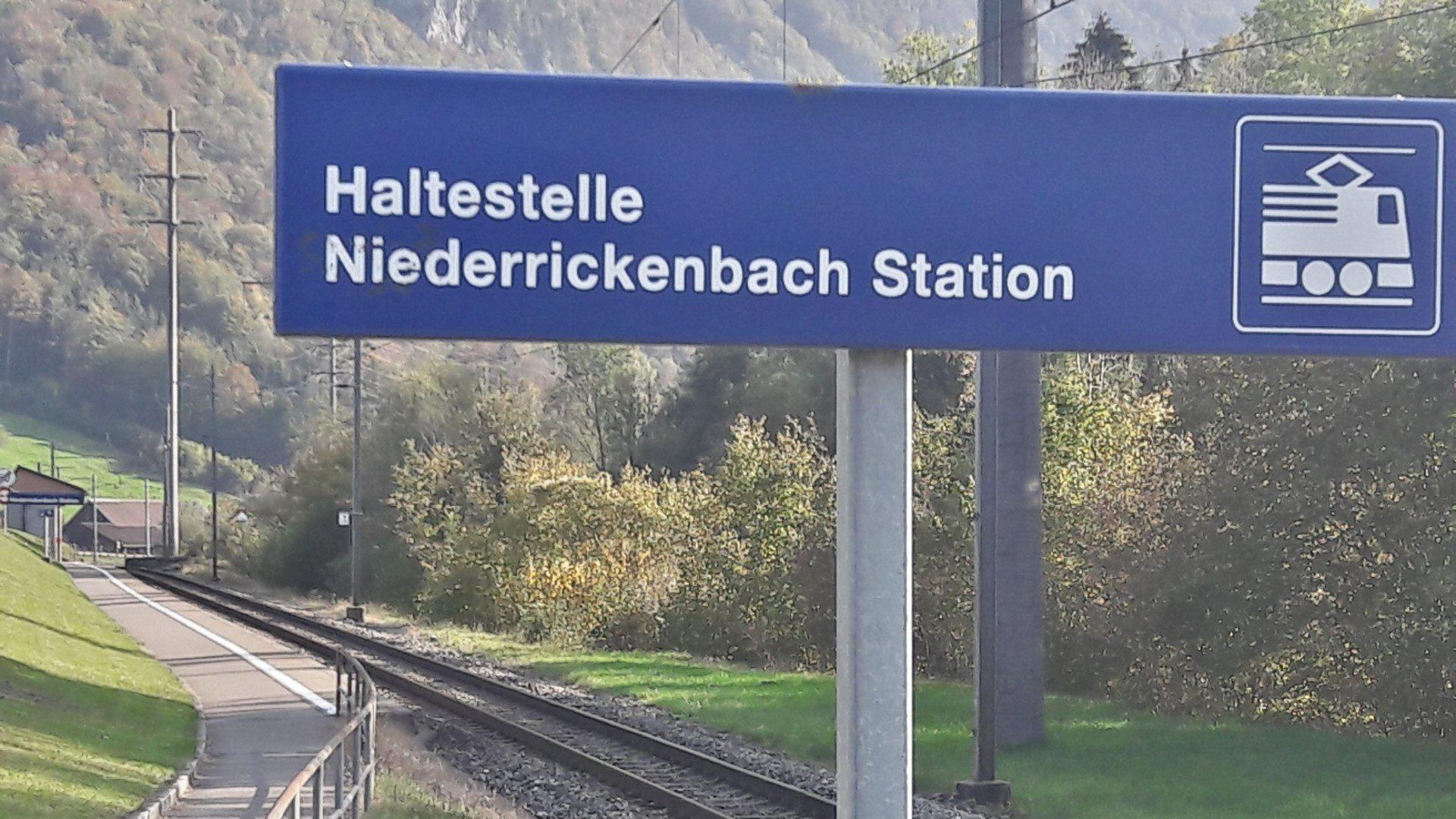
- The station platform in 2018

General information
- Location: Kantonstrasse; Wolfenschiessen; Switzerland
- Coordinates: 46°55′40″N 8°23′46″E
- Elevation: 488 m (1,601 ft)
- Owner: Zentralbahn
- Line: Luzern–Stans–Engelberg line
- Train operators: Zentralbahn

Services
Preceding station	Zentralbahn	Following station
Wolfenschiessen towards Engelberg	InterRegio Luzern-Engelberg Express	Dallenwil towards Lucerne
Location
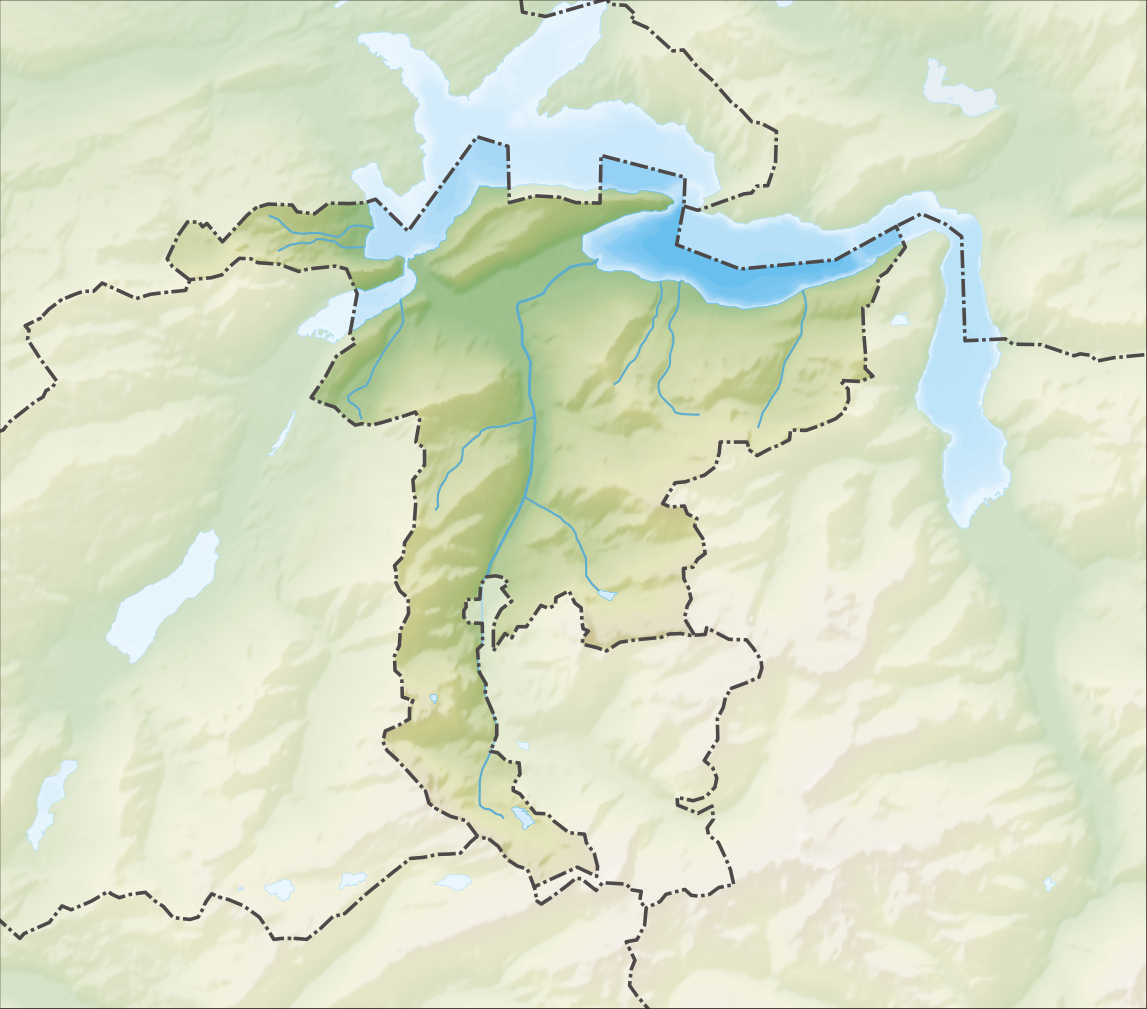
- Location within Switzerland Location within Canton of Nidwalden

Niederrickenbach Station railway station is a Swiss railway station in the municipality of Wolfenschiessen in the canton of Nidwalden. It is on the Luzern–Stans–Engelberg line, owned by the Zentralbahn railway company. The station is adjacent to the lower station of the cable car, to the hamlet of Niederrickenbach and the convent of Maria-Rickenbach, from which it takes its name.

Niederrickenbach station is 2.3 km (1.4 mi) horizontally and 650 m (2,130 ft) vertically from Niederrickenbach hamlet. Unusually, and perhaps for this reason, the German language railway timetable includes the word Station as part of the name of this railway station. Because of the distance the station was made a request stop.

== Services ==
The following services stop at Niederrickenbach Station:

- InterRegio Luzern-Engelberg Express: hourly service between Lucerne and Engelberg.

The station is also served by the cable car to the hamlet of Niederrickenbach and the convent of Maria-Rickenbach, which operates every half-hour.

== See also ==
- Thörishaus Station railway station
