= Dallenwil railway station =

Railway station in Switzerland

Dallenwil
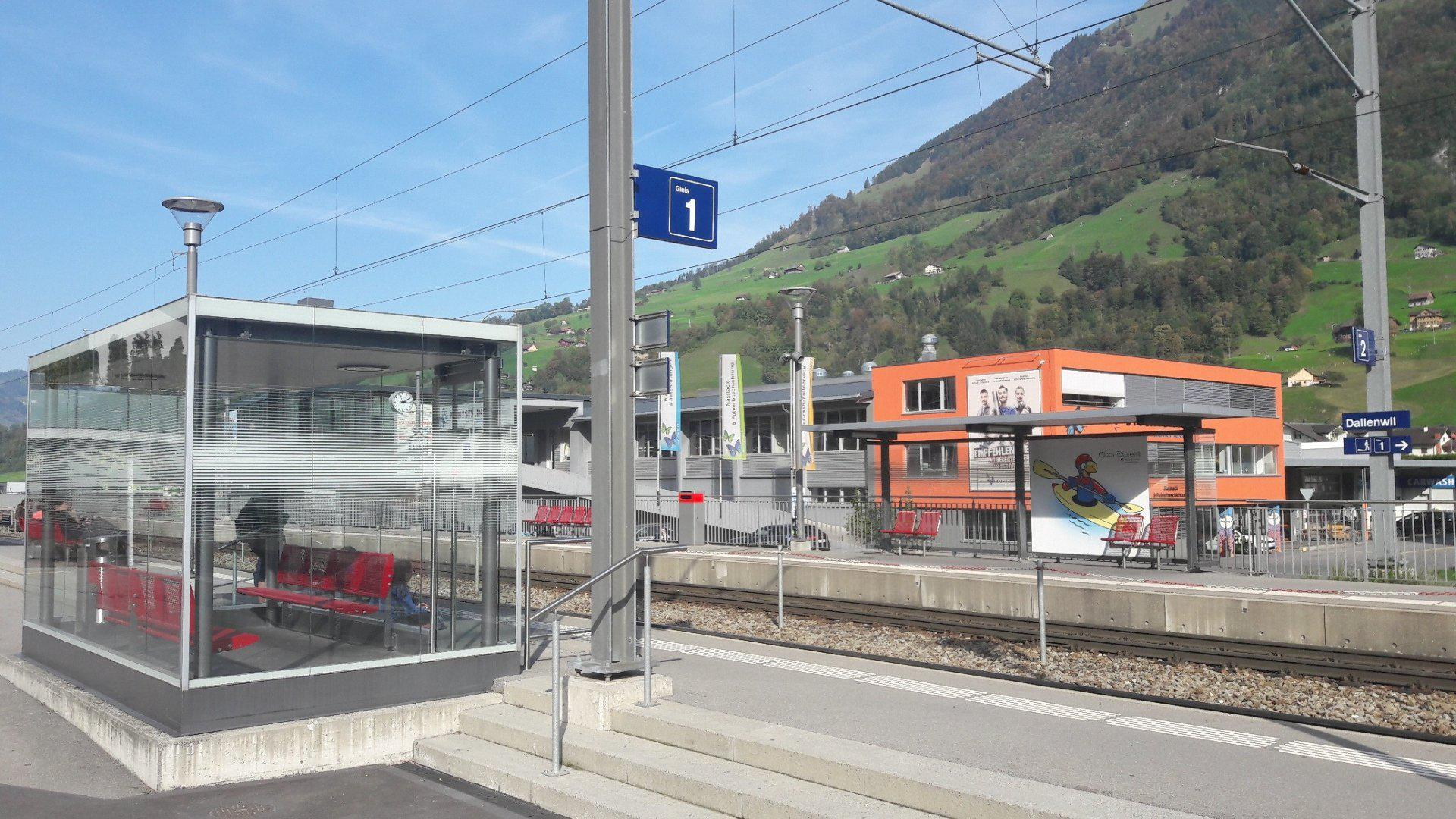
- The station platform in 2018

General information
- Location: Bahnhofstrasse; Dallenwil; Switzerland
- Coordinates: 46°56′02″N 8°23′31″E
- Elevation: 485 m (1,591 ft)
- Owner: Zentralbahn
- Line: Luzern–Stans–Engelberg line
- Train operators: Zentralbahn

Services
Preceding station	Zentralbahn	Following station
Niederrickenbach Station towards Engelberg	InterRegio Luzern-Engelberg Express	Stans towards Lucerne
Preceding station	Lucerne S-Bahn	Following station
Wolfenschiessen Terminus	S4	Stans towards Lucerne
Location
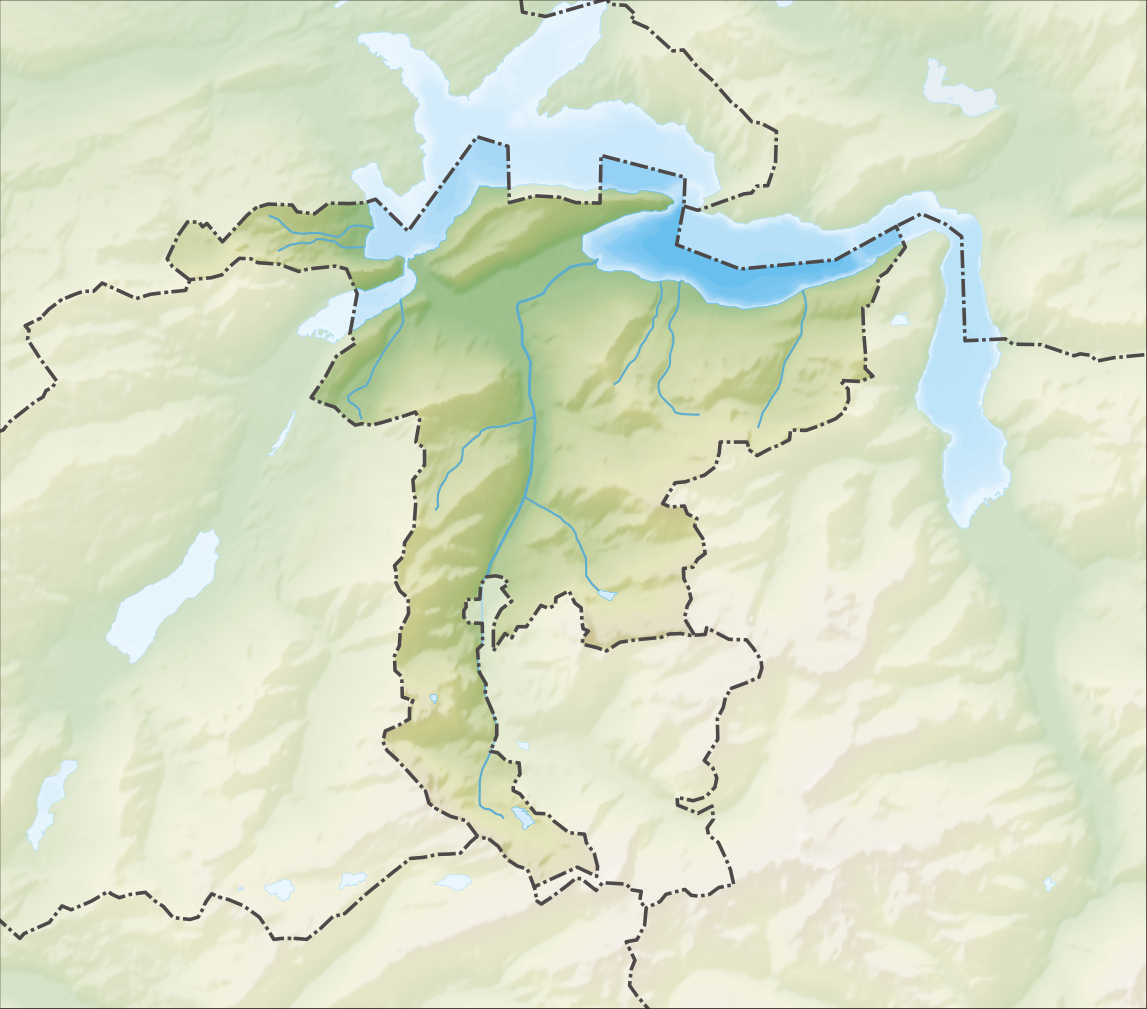
- Location within Switzerland Location within Canton of Nidwalden

Dallenwil railway station is a Swiss railway station in the municipality of Dallenwil in the canton of Nidwalden. It is on the Luzern–Stans–Engelberg line, owned by the Zentralbahn railway company.

== Services ==
The following services stop at Dallenwil:

- InterRegio Luzern-Engelberg Express: hourly service between Lucerne and Engelberg.
- Lucerne S-Bahn S4: hourly service between Lucerne and Wolfenschiessen
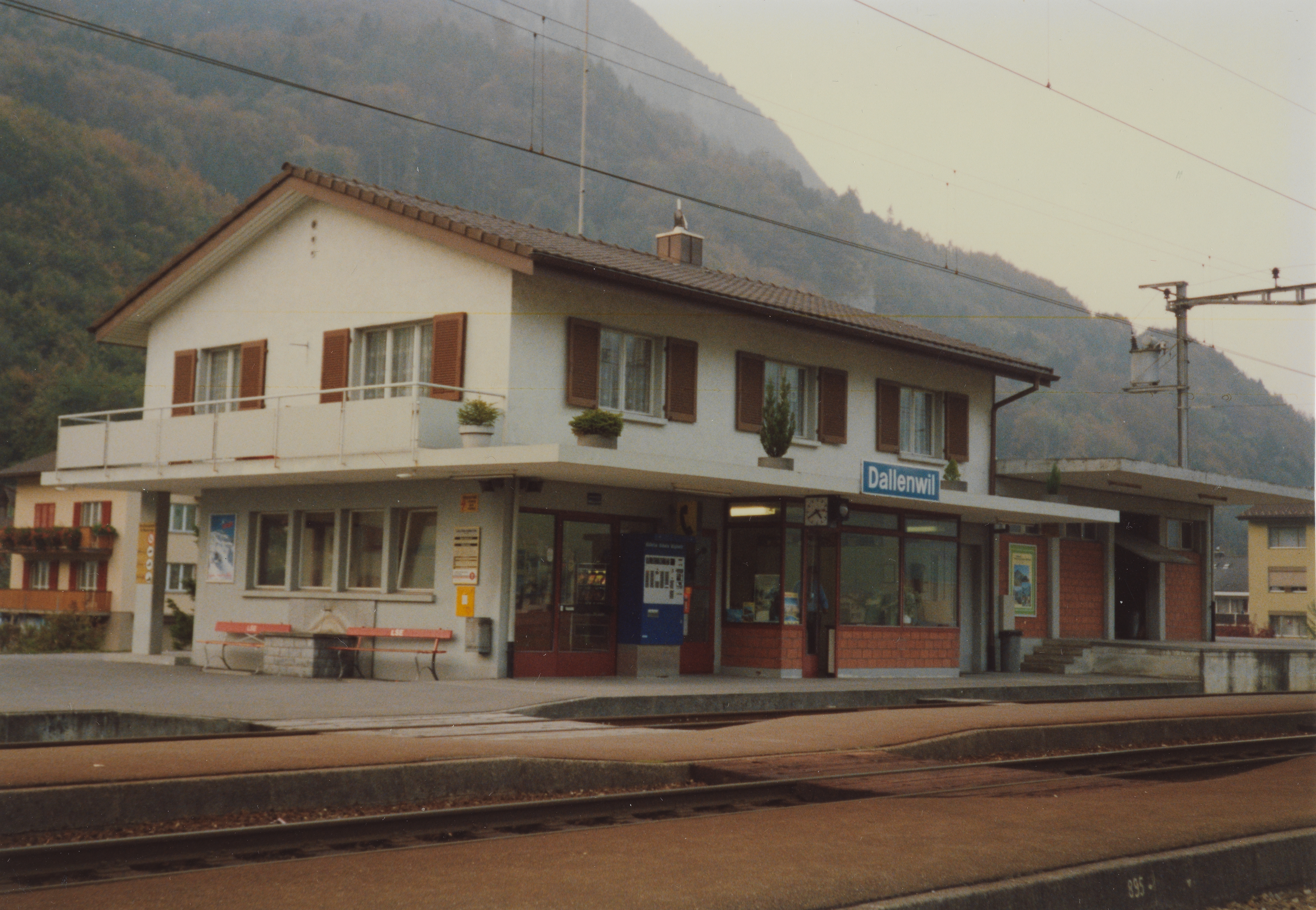
station building in 1990

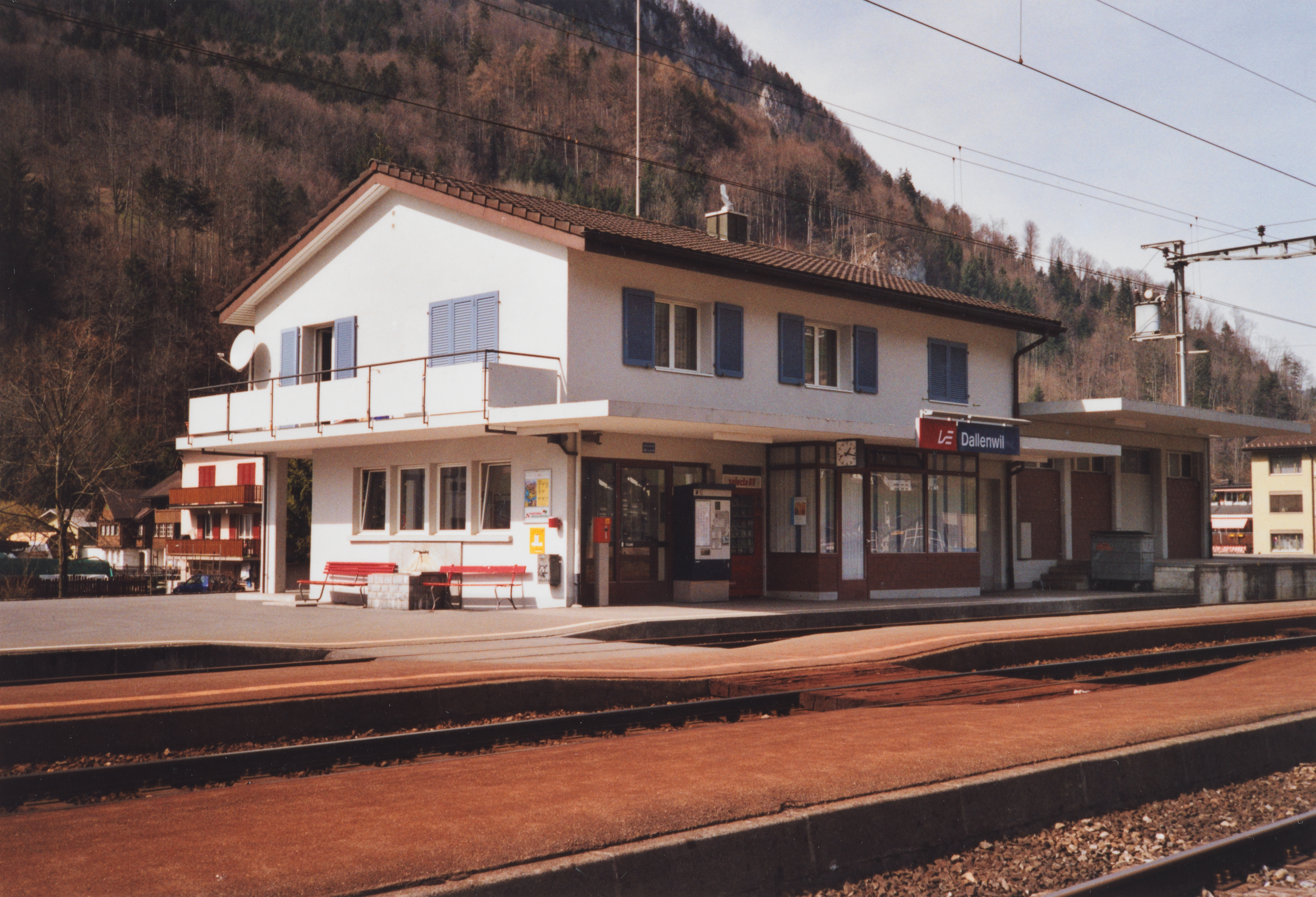
station building in 2004
