= Grafenort railway station =

Railway station in Switzerland

Grafenort
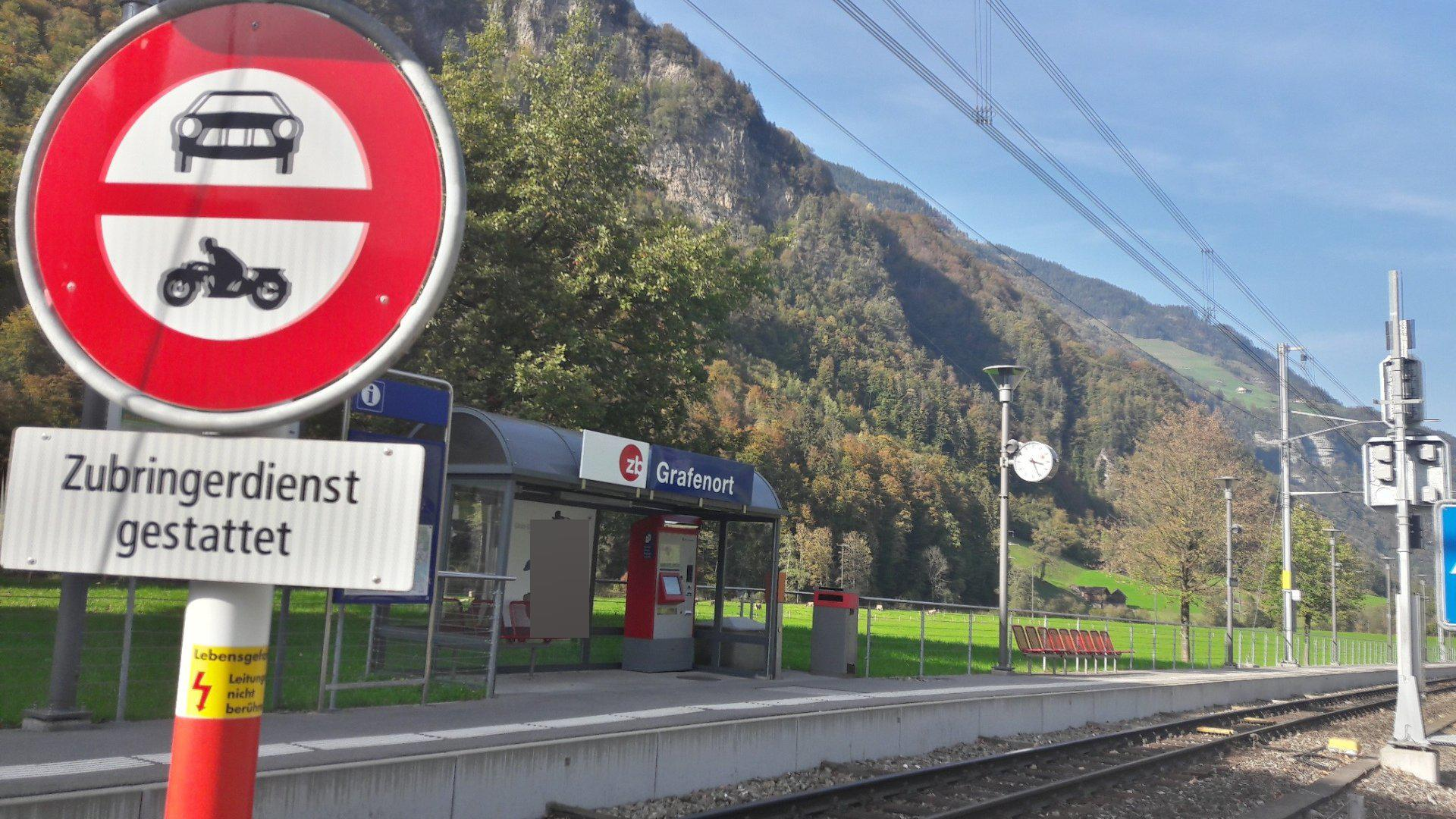
- The station platform in 2018

General information
- Location: Engelberg; Switzerland
- Coordinates: 46°52′14″N 8°22′21″E
- Elevation: 569 m (1,867 ft)
- Owner: Zentralbahn
- Line: Luzern–Stans–Engelberg line
- Train operators: Zentralbahn

Services
Preceding station	Zentralbahn	Following station
Engelberg Terminus	InterRegio Luzern-Engelberg Express	Wolfenschiessen towards Lucerne
Location
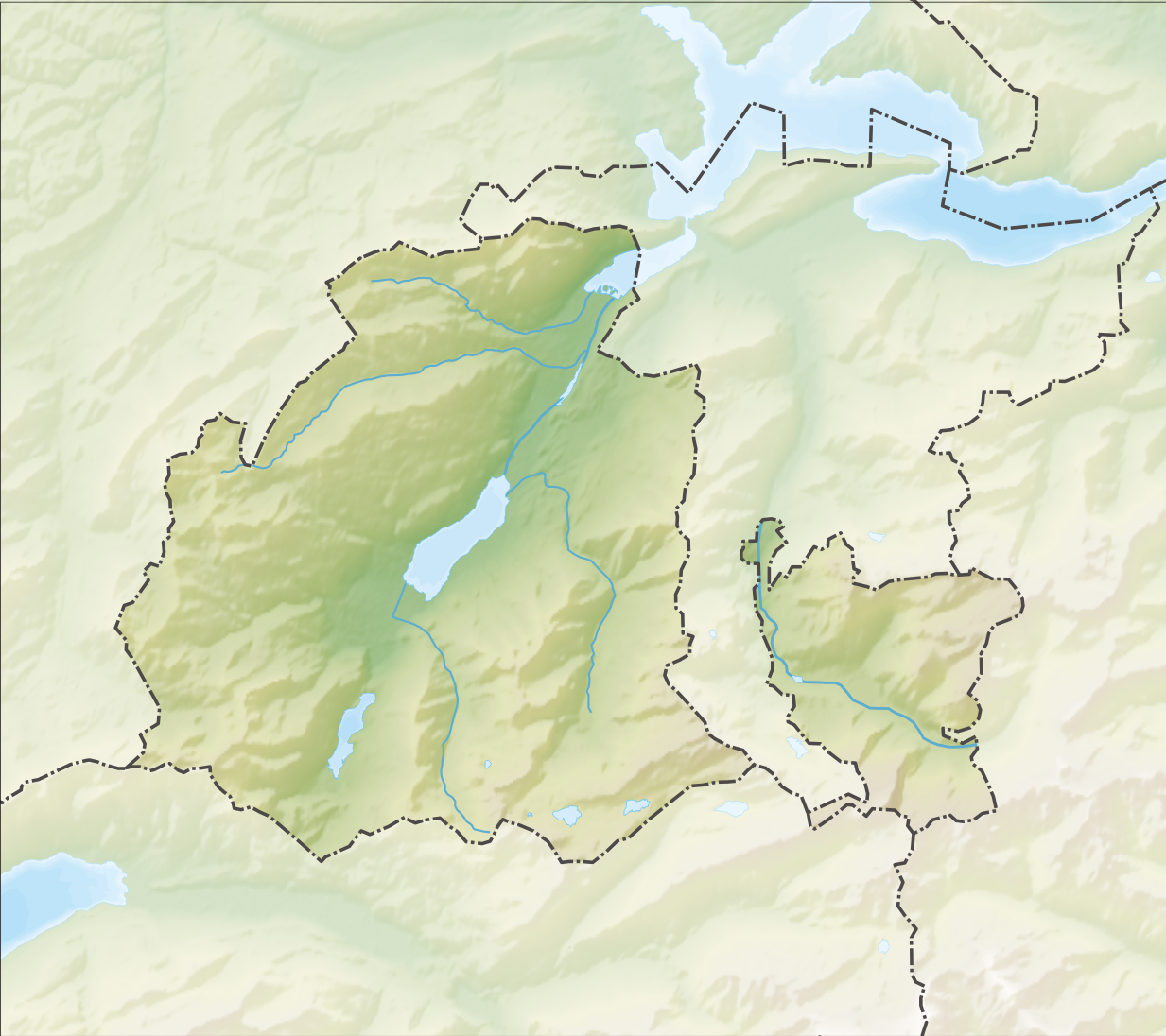
- Location within Switzerland Location within Canton of Obwalden

Grafenort railway station is a Swiss railway station in the municipality of Engelberg in the canton of Obwalden. It is on the Luzern–Stans–Engelberg line, which is owned by the Zentralbahn railway company. It takes its name from the nearby settlement of Grafenort.

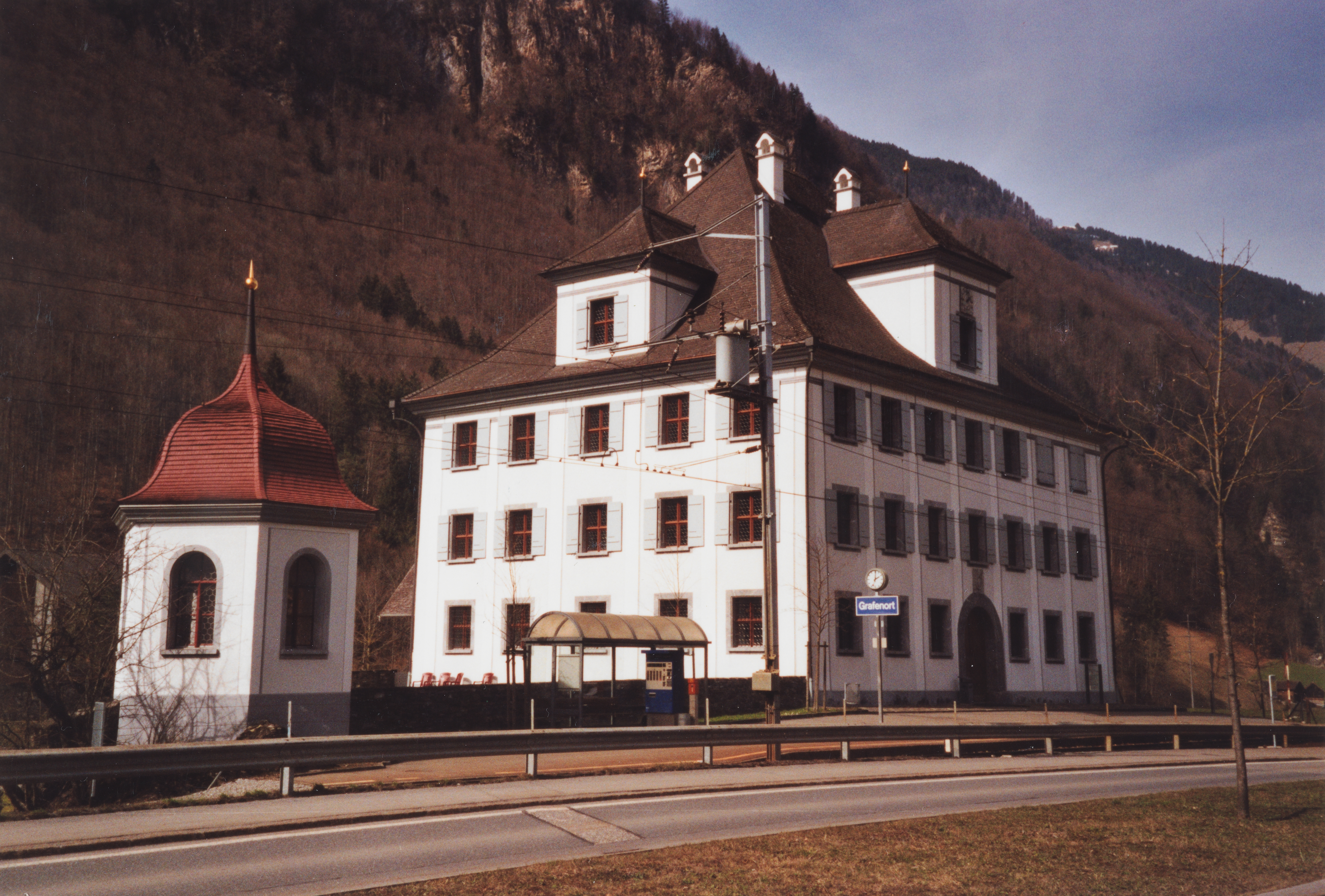
Station with Herrenhaus Grafenort in the background (2004)

== Services ==
The following services stop at Grafenort:

- InterRegio Luzern-Engelberg Express: hourly service between Lucerne and Engelberg.
