= Wolfenschiessen railway station =

Railway station in Switzerland

Wolfenschiessen
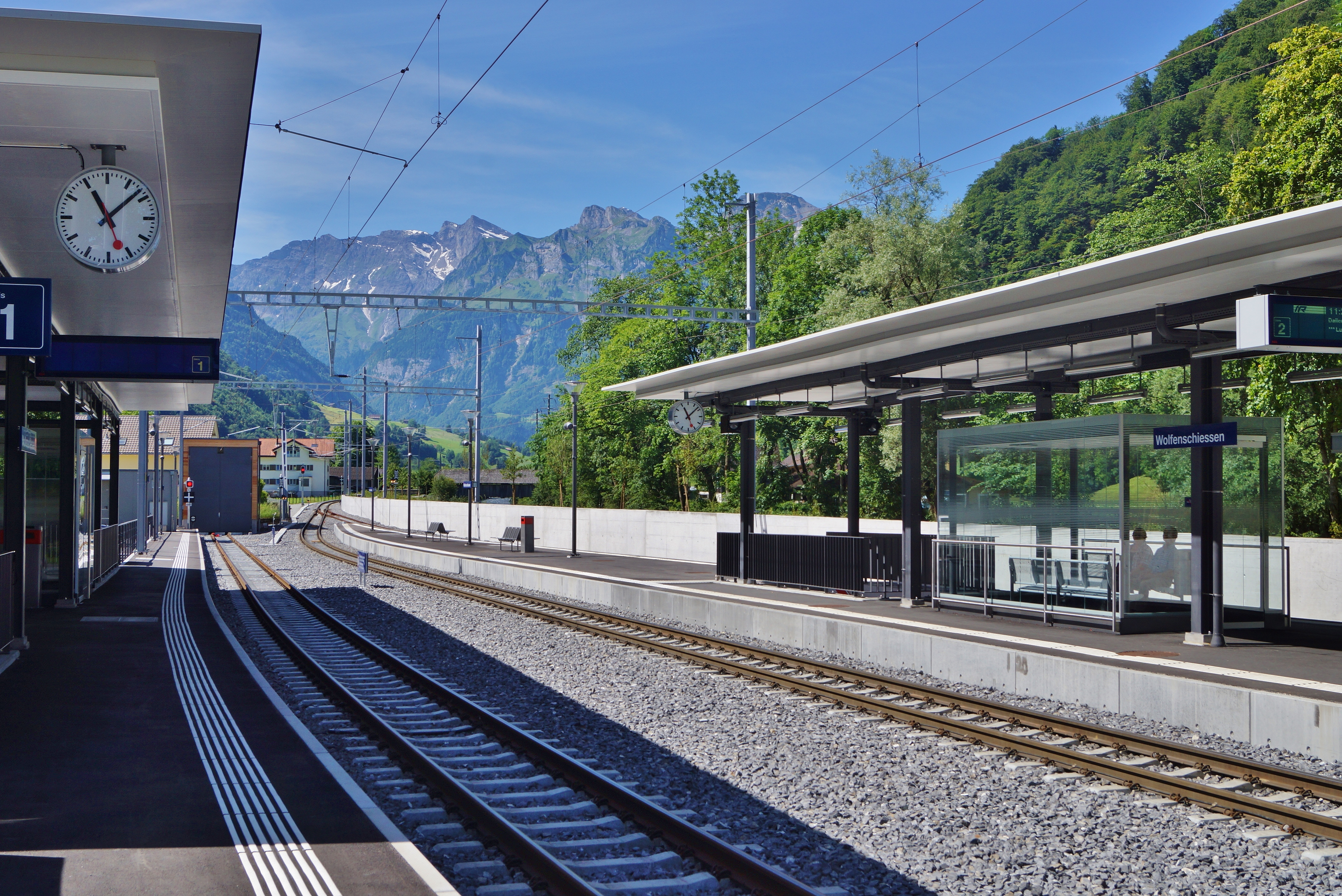
- Track 1 for S4 / View to southwest

General information
- Location: Bahnhofstrasse; Wolfenschiessen; Switzerland
- Coordinates: 46°54′28″N 8°23′41″E
- Elevation: 511 m (1,677 ft)
- Owner: Zentralbahn
- Line: Luzern–Stans–Engelberg line
- Train operators: Zentralbahn

Services
Preceding station	Zentralbahn	Following station
Grafenort towards Engelberg	InterRegio Luzern-Engelberg Express	Niederrickenbach Station towards Lucerne
Preceding station	Lucerne S-Bahn	Following station
Terminus	S4	Dallenwil towards Lucerne
Location
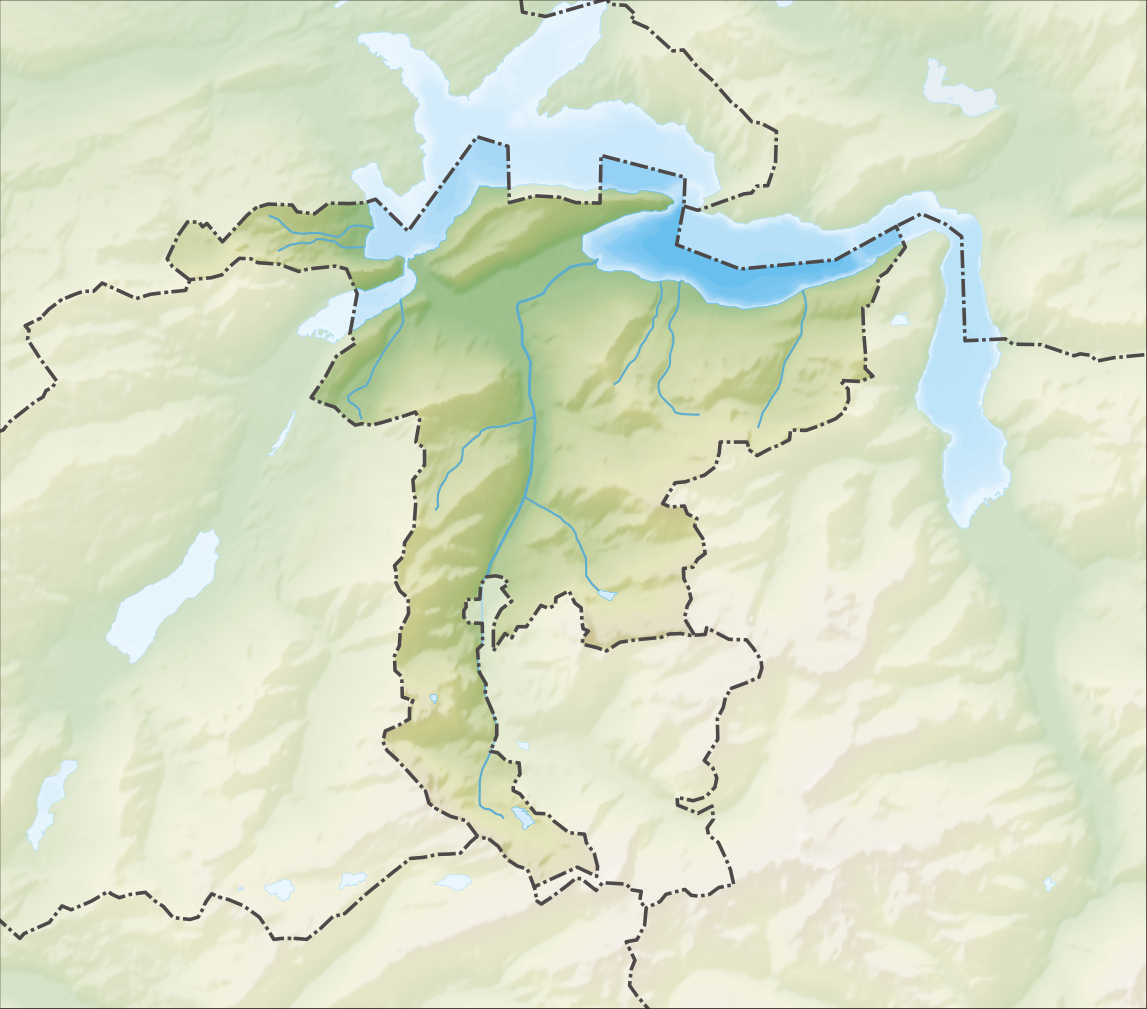
- Location within Switzerland Location within Canton of Nidwalden

Wolfenschiessen railway station is a Swiss railway station in the municipality of Wolfenschiessen in the canton of Nidwalden. It is on the Luzern–Stans–Engelberg line, owned by the Zentralbahn railway company.

== Services ==
The following services stop at Wolfenschiessen:

- InterRegio Luzern-Engelberg Express: hourly service between Lucerne and Engelberg.
- Lucerne S-Bahn S4: hourly service to Lucerne.

The station is also served by a post bus service to Oberrickenbach, with eight services per day.

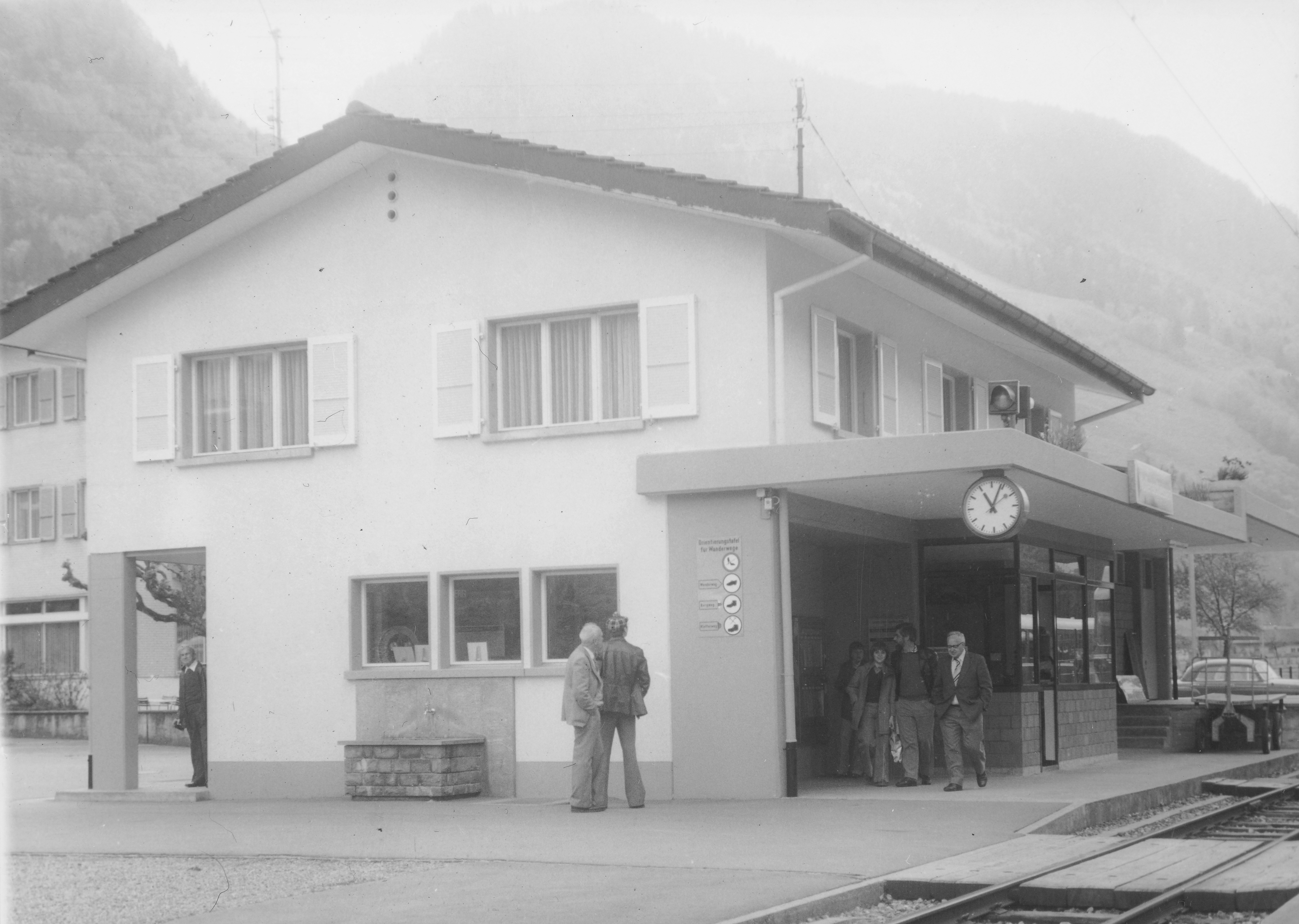
station building in 1977

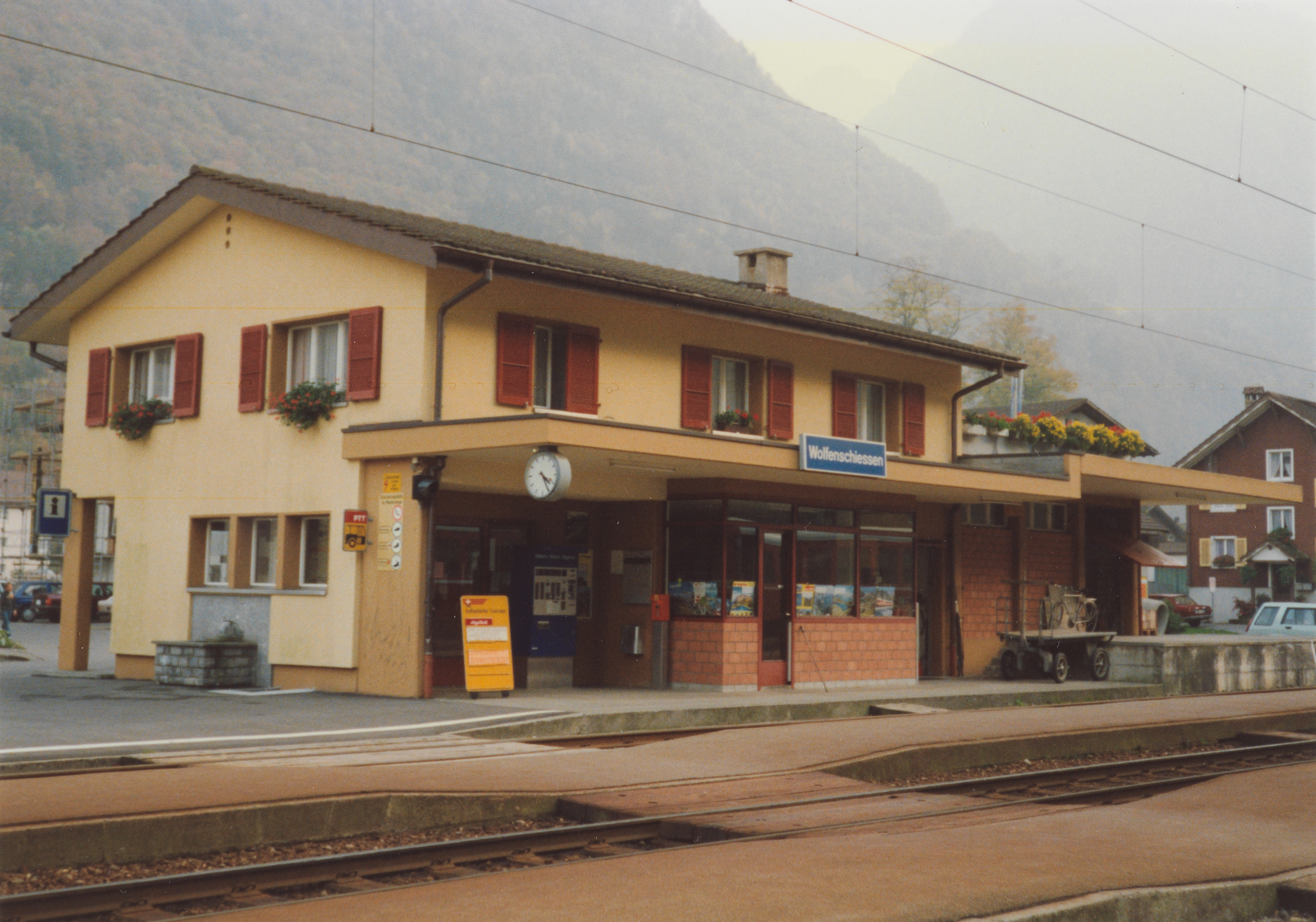
station building in 1990

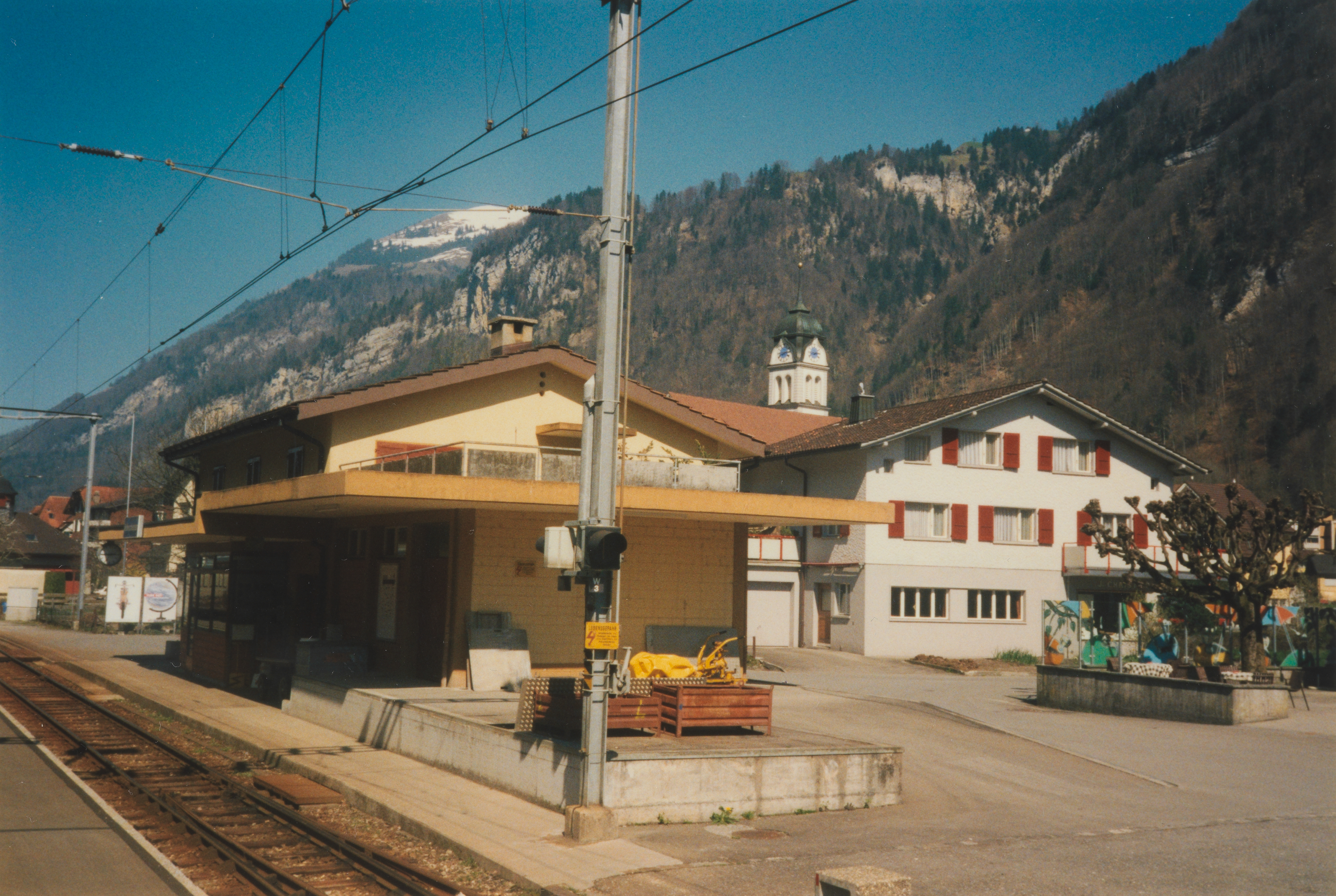
station in 2000, goods shed in the foreground

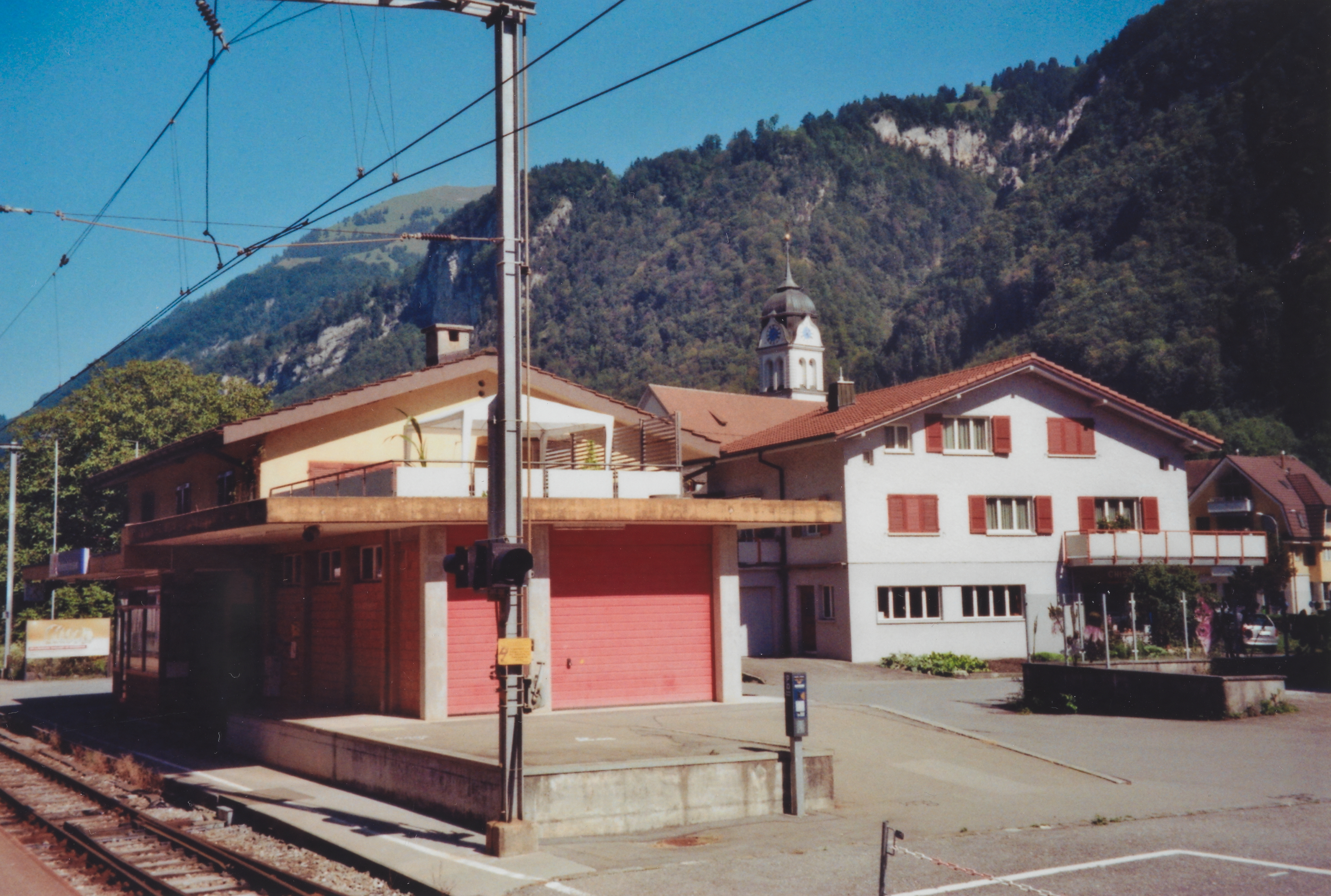
station in 2012
