= Grafenort – Engelberg Tunnel =

Railway tunnel in Switzerland

Coordinates: 46.8374°N 8.3857°E

- Interactive map of Grafenort – Engelberg Tunnel

Overview
- Line: Luzern–Stans–Engelberg-Bahn
- Location: Engelberg, Switzerland
- Status: Active

Operation
- Constructed: 2001–2010
- Opened: 12 February 2010
- Owner: Zentralbahn
- Operator: Zentralbahn
- Traffic: Rail
- Character: Passenger and freight

Technical
- Length: 4,043 m (13,264 ft)
- No. of tracks: 1
- Track gauge: 1,000 mm (3 ft 3 3/8 in) metre gauge
- Electrified: Overhead catenary 15 kV AC 16 2/3 Hz
- Grade: 10.5%

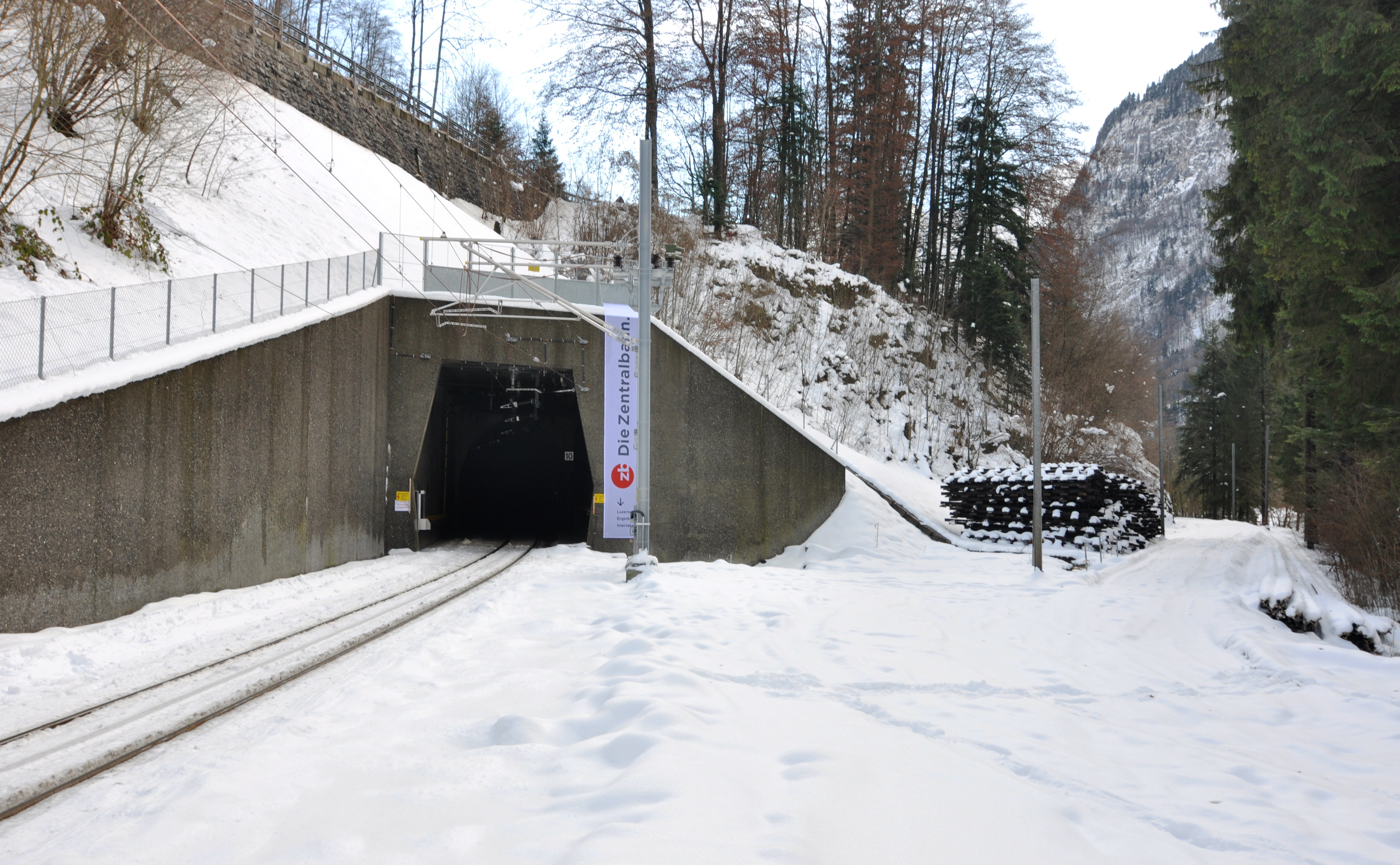
Portal of the tunnel in December 2010

The Grafenort – Engelberg Tunnel is a railway tunnel on the Luzern–Stans–Engelberg-Bahn line, which forms one portion of the Zentralbahn in Switzerland. It replaced the steepest section of the line, an inclined length of 1,600 meters that had a peak gradient of 25%, allowing for a faster transit since its completion.

Following a number of preparatory surveys and assessments, construction of the tunnel commenced during March 2000. Work was delayed by two years due to a particularly severe flood that started in August 2005; it had been recognised beforehand that water ingress was a particular threat, thus the project included the construction of a concrete inner vault. The completed tunnel was officially opened during February 2010.

== Construction ==
The historical route of the Luzern–Stans–Engelberg-Bahn railway line featured a particularly challenging incline, as much as 25%, between Grafenort and Engelberg. It was long recognised that the introduction of a more direct tunnel in place of the incline would be desirable for both efficiency and speed; in comparison with the Grafenort – Engelberg Tunnel (as built), the original route of the line resulted in an uphill journey time that was roughly 14 minutes greater, the inclined section was also a constraint upon the line's capacity that has been eliminated through the tunnel's construction. Furthermore, the new alignment via the tunnel was projected to generate returns via the reductions made in both maintenance and operating costs.

During the tunnel's planning phase, substantial consideration was paid to the environment. Various risk assessments were performed and mitigation measures implemented due to some of the surrounding local geography being particularly vulnerable to floods, landslides, and avalanches. Specifically, the geology meant that the tunnel would be perceptible to water intrusion, while there was a high change of encountering dangerous gases during the boring process as well. Despite these determinations, the construction of a tunnel was deemed to be viable. The specific route selected for the tunnel featured gradients varying between 6% and 10.5% along a total length of 4,060 meters (2.5 miles), considerably superior to the old surface alignment that involved a much greater ascent.

During March 2010, construction of the tunnel commenced. The boring process heavily relied upon traditional methods, using both drilling and blasting during the excavation; excavation work was simultaneously performed from both of the future tunnel portals. Multiple technical challenges were encountered during the construction phase; these have been attributed with a significant rise in the project's cost, totalling 176.5 million CHF. Two instances of significant flooding occurred mid-way through the tunnel's construction. The largest flood brought work to a halt during August 2005, construction was not able to continue until roughly two years later. Furthermore, areas beyond the partially-built tunnel were affected by the high waters; around 1,500 tourists in neighbouring Engelberg were trapped and had to be airlifted to safety.

Throughout the winter of 2008/2009, work was focused around the completion of a concrete inner vault, which varied in thickness between 50 and 70 cm, as a countermeasure against further water ingress. During the fitting-out phase of the tunnel's construction, some relatively innovative techniques were employed to accelerate the rate of work, such as the staged installation of the overhead conductor rails, track, and signalling/communication equipment.

During February 2010, the tunnel was officially opened in a ceremony officiated by the abbot of the nearby Engelberg Abbey. Following changes to the timetable following the tunnel's completion, the fastest journey times between Engelberg and Zürich/Bern have been shortened by 19 minutes. In order to maximise the advantages offered by the tunnel's opening, which presented the opportunity of running trains that were both longer and faster than those of the historical route, a new power station was constructed in order to provide additional electrical power to the line.
