= Stadler SPATZ =

Narrow gauge multiple unit train

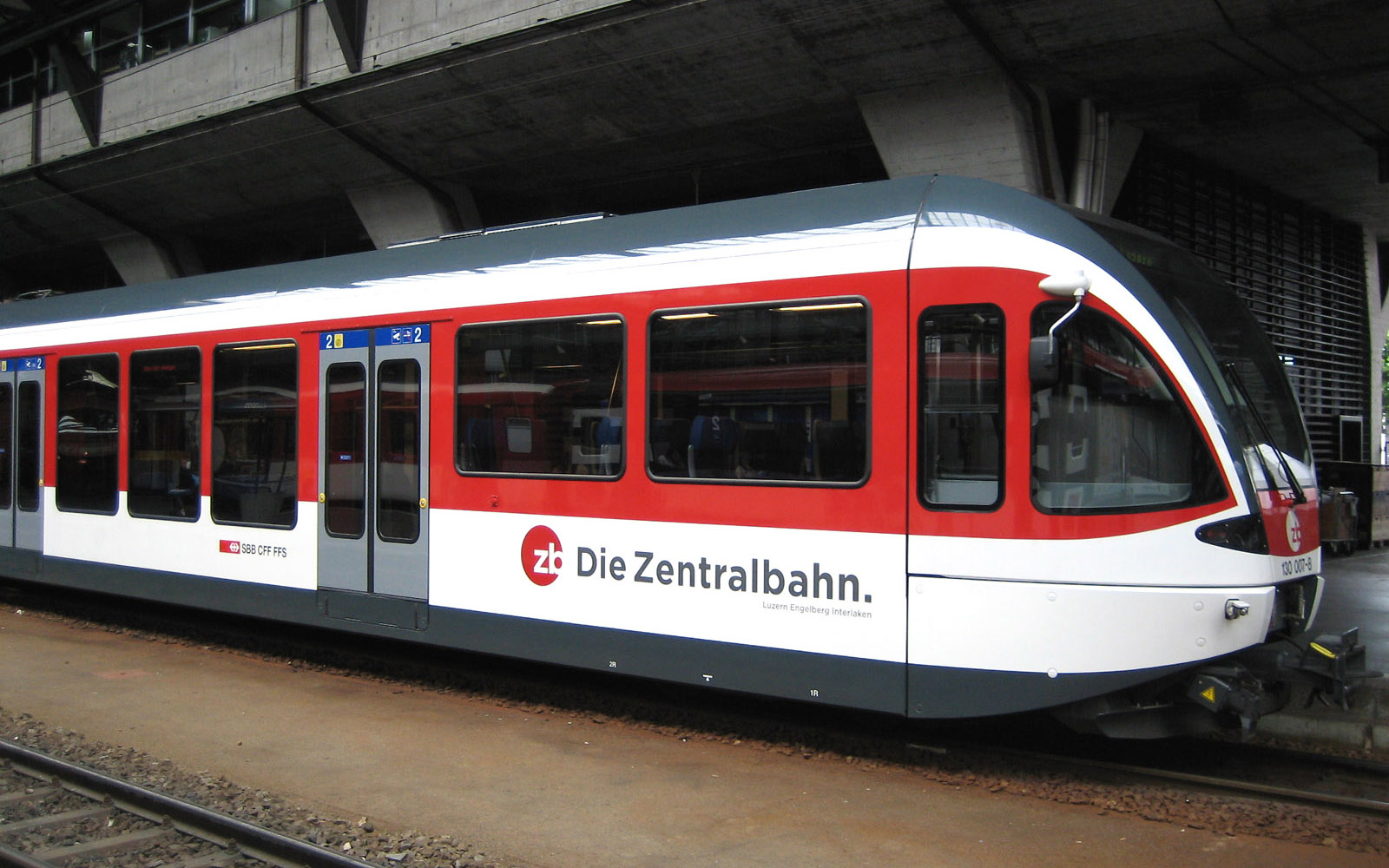
A Stadler 'SPATZ' unit on the Zentralbahn

The Stadler SPATZ or Schmalspur Panorama Trieb Zug ("Spatz" being the German word for "sparrow") is a narrow gauge multiple unit manufactured by Stadler Rail. It consists of three articulated sections. The centre section is high floor and contains the motors and traction equipment. The centre section is fitted with extra large panoramic windows. The end sections are similar to those of the Stadler GTW. They are low-floor and have a bogie at the outer end and are supported by the central section at the inner end.

Stadler SPATZ units (classified as ABe 130) are used on the adhesion sections of the Zentralbahn (Luzern S-Bahn and Interlaken – Meiringen). The units can work alone, in multiple or with a control car.

Stadler SPATZ units are also used by the Matterhorn Gotthard Bahn (as classes 2011, 2021 and 2051) and SNCF (as class Z 850) on the Ligne de Saint Gervais - Vallorcine.
