= Engelberg railway station =

Railway station in Switzerland

Engelberg
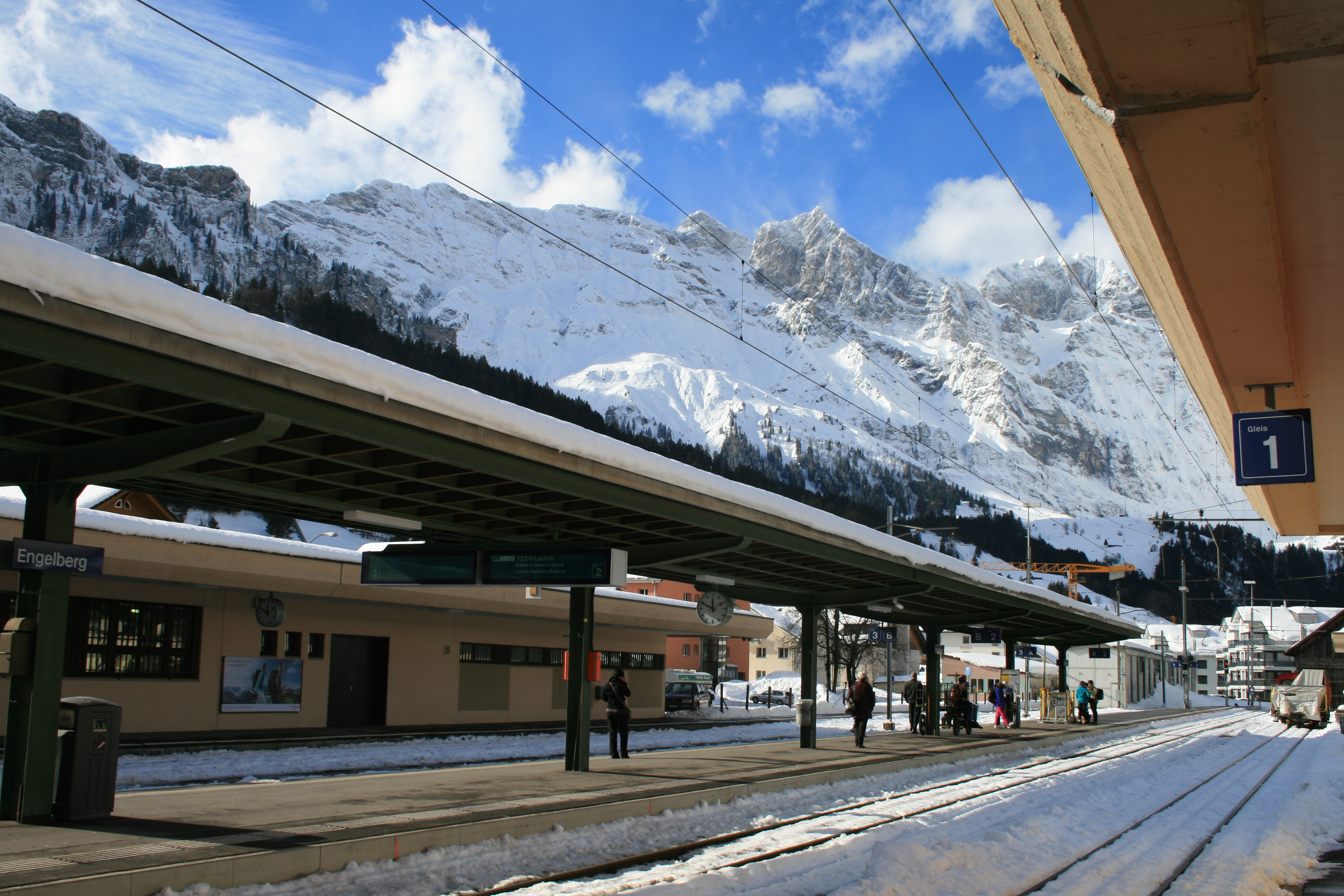
- The station platforms in 2013

General information
- Location: Bahnhofstrasse; Engelberg; Switzerland
- Coordinates: 46°49′10″N 8°24′09″E
- Elevation: 999 m (3,278 ft)
- Owner: Zentralbahn
- Line: Luzern–Stans–Engelberg line
- Train operators: Zentralbahn

Services
Preceding station	Zentralbahn	Following station
Terminus	InterRegio Luzern-Engelberg Express	Grafenort towards Lucerne
Location
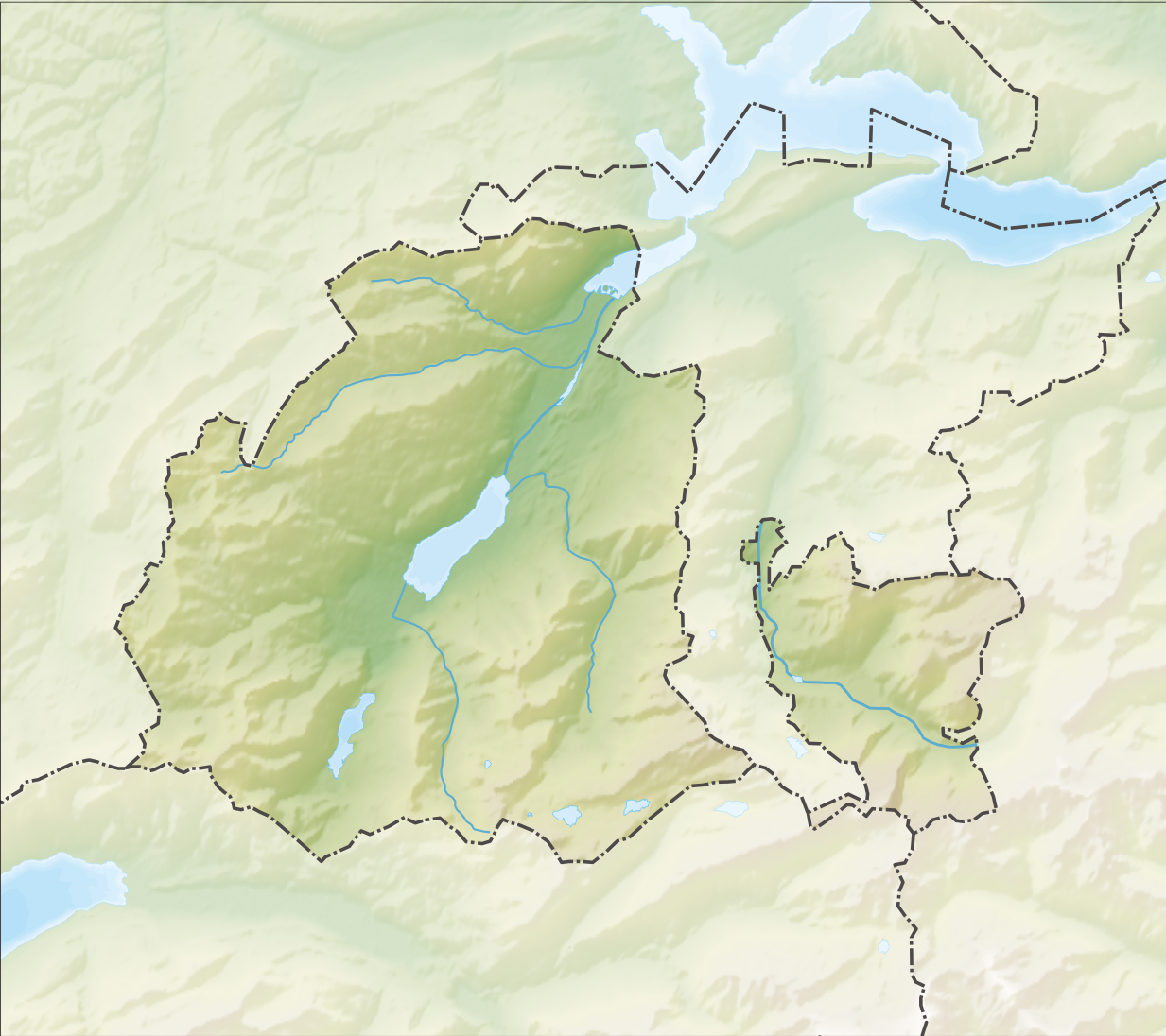
- Location within Switzerland Location within Canton of Obwalden

Engelberg railway station is a Swiss railway station in the municipality of Engelberg in the canton of Obwalden. It is the terminus of the Luzern–Stans–Engelberg line, which is owned by the Zentralbahn railway company.

== Services ==
The following services stop at Engelberg:

- InterRegio Luzern-Engelberg Express: hourly service to Lucerne.
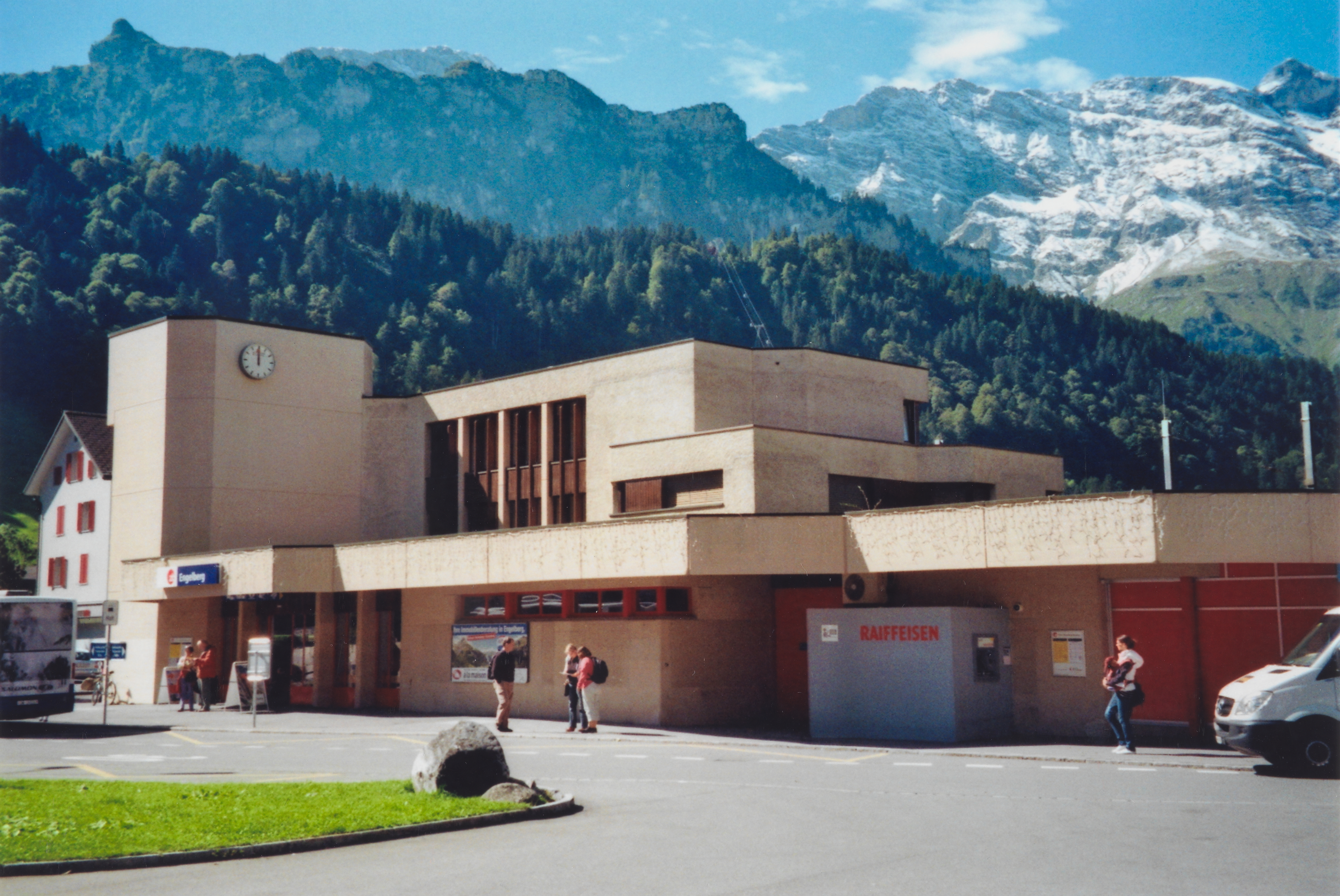
Station building, street side (2007)

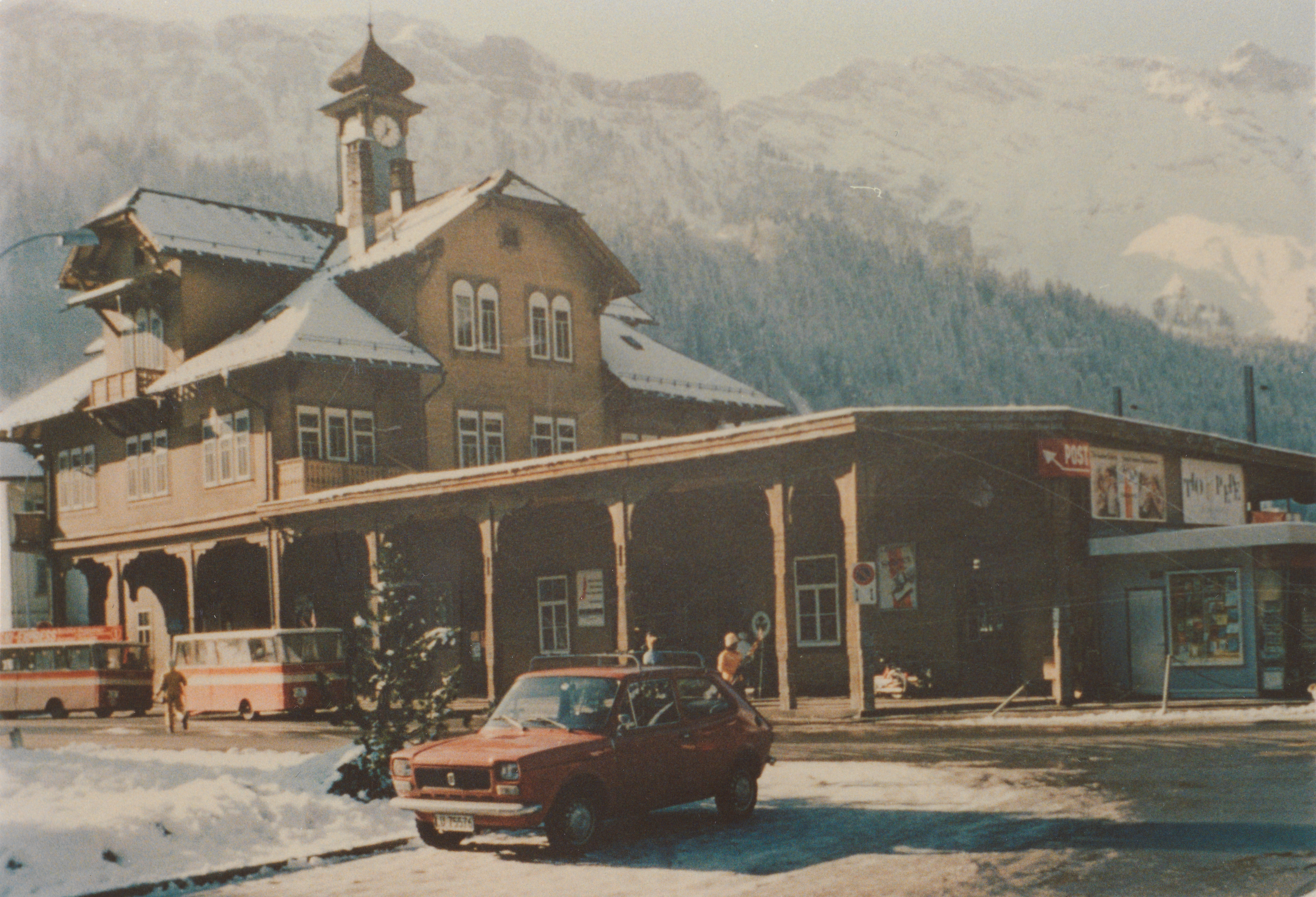
Old station building (about 1980)

== See also ==
- Rail transport in Switzerland
