= Zentralbahn =

Swiss Railway Company

Zentralbahn AG
- Company type: Joint-stock company
- Industry: Transport
- Founded: 2005
- Headquarters: Stansstad (Nidwalden), Switzerland
- Area served: Central Switzerland; Bernese Oberland
- Website: http://www.zentralbahn.ch/

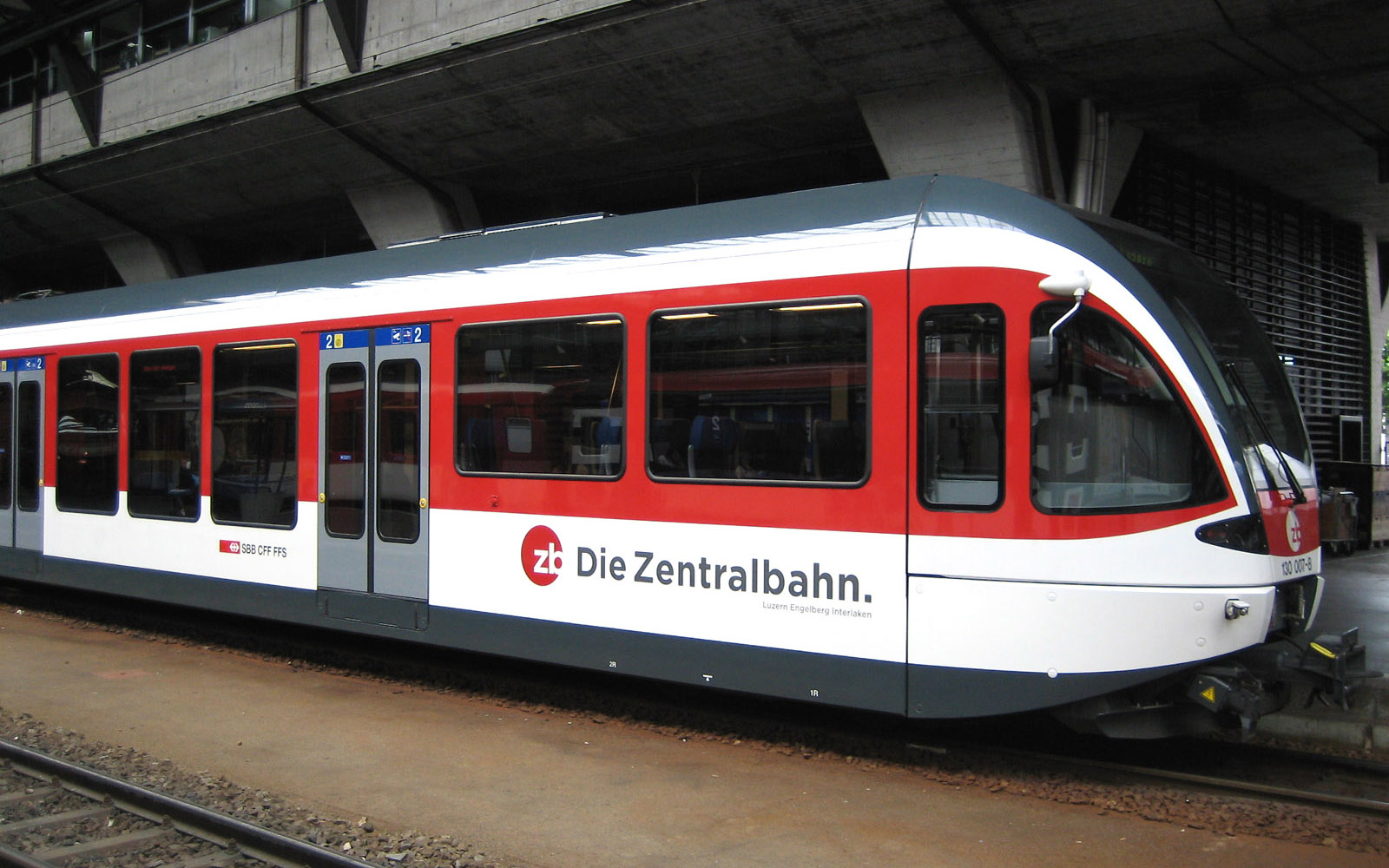
A Zentralbahn Stadler 'SPATZ' unit, as used on the company's S-Bahn and Regio services, displays the company's logo.

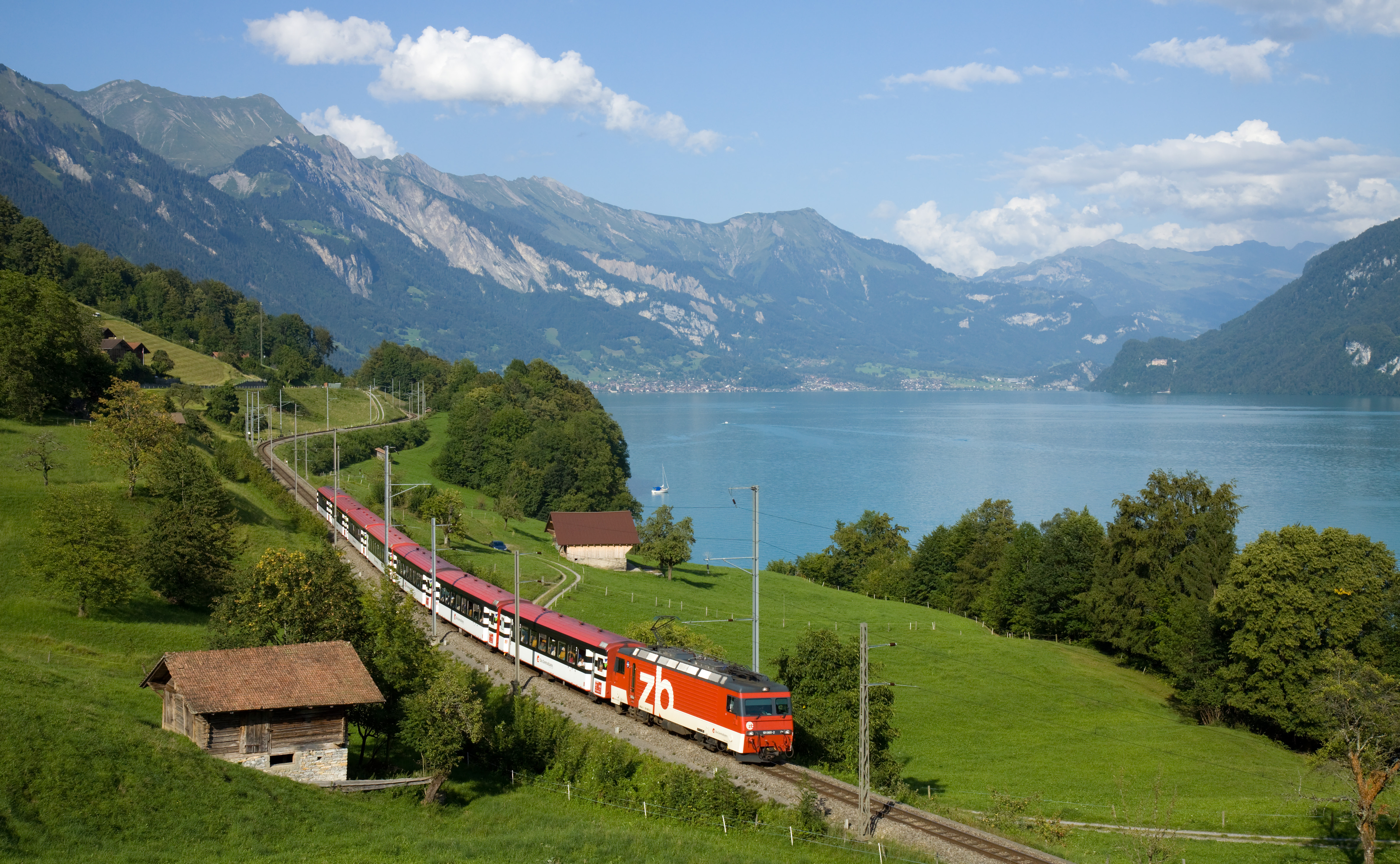
Zentralbahn Interregio train following the Lake Brienz shoreline, near Niederried.

The Zentralbahn is a Swiss railway company that owns and operates two connecting railway lines in Central Switzerland and the Bernese Oberland. It was created on January 1, 2005, with the acquisition of the independently owned Luzern–Stans–Engelberg line, and the Brünig line of the Swiss Federal Railways. The company has its headquarters in Stansstad.

The railway owns the infrastructure of the 74 km (46 mi) long inter-regional Brünig line, which links Lucerne and Interlaken over the Brünig Pass, and the 25 km (16 mi) long Luzern–Stans–Engelberg line from Hergiswil, on the Brünig line some 9 km (5.6 mi) out of Lucerne, to Engelberg. Both lines are built to the 1,000 mm (3 ft 3 3/8 in) metre gauge, and use rack railway technology to climb their steepest gradients, although most of both lines uses conventional adhesion.

The railway operates two hourly InterRegio express services, one between Lucerne and Interlaken, and one between Lucerne and Engelberg. It also operates two half-hourly services of the Lucerne S-Bahn, the S4 between Lucerne and Wolfenschiessen and the S5 between Lucerne and Giswil. During the rush hour, there are additional trains named S41, S44 and S55. At the Interlaken end of the line, an hourly Regio service is operated as far as Meiringen. Only the two InterRegio services traverse the company's rack sections and require rack equipped stock.

== History ==
The two lines of the Zentralbahn have quite distinct histories.

=== History of the Brünig line ===
The Brünig line was constructed in incremental stages between 1888 and 1916. The first stages, over the Brünig Pass between Brienz and Alpnachstad were opened by the Jura–Bern–Lucerne Railway (JBL), who also extended the line from Alpnachstad to Lucerne, giving connections to the rest of the Swiss railway network. Subsequently, the JBL became part of the Jura–Simplon Railway (JS) in 1891, and the JS became part of the Swiss Federal Railways (SBB) in 1903. The SBB opened the last section of the line, from Brienz to Interlaken in 1916.

As constructed, the line was operated by steam locomotives, and used the Riggenbach rack system to overcome gradients of up to 12% on the approaches to each side of the Brünig Pass. The line was electrified in 1941 and 1942, using the standard Swiss main line system of 15 kV 16.7 Hz AC supplied by overhead line. The rack sections were retained.

=== History of the Luzern–Stans–Engelberg line ===
The major part of the line to Engelberg was constructed by Stansstad–Engelberg Railway (StEB) and opened in 1898. The line ran from Stansstad to Engelberg and, like the Brünig line in its early days, relied on steamship connections with the rest of the Swiss railway network. Unlike the Brünig line, the StEB line was electrified from its opening, using a three-phase alternating current overhead line supply. It also used the Riggenbach rack system on its final approaches to Engelberg, but with a very steep maximum gradient of 25%.

In 1960 work started on connecting the Engelberg line to the Swiss railway network by constructing a new line between Stansstad and Hergiswil on the Brünig line. This involved constructing a bridge over the narrow Alpnachersee arm of Lake Lucerne, followed by the Lopper II tunnel, under a shoulder of Mount Pilatus. In order to allow Engelberg trains to run over the Brünig line into Lucerne, the whole railway was converted to the same electrical system (15 kV 16.7 Hz AC), and new rolling stock acquired. The line reopened in 1964, and the owning company changed its name to the Luzern–Stans–Engelberg Railway (LSE). For 40 years, the ownership structure of the two lines remained unchanged, with LSE owned trains running over SBB owned tracks between Hergiswil and Lucerne. However, in June 2004, the Swiss Federal Council empowered the SBB to transfer the Brünig line to the LSE with effect from January 2005. In return the LSE issued shares to the SBB, and as a result 2/3 of its shares are now owned by SBB. The LSE was subsequently renamed the Zentralbahn to reflect its much larger scale of operation.

At the end of 2009, the Zentralbahn took over the operation of the 1,435 mm (4 ft 8 1/2 in) (standard gauge) tracks of the Kriens-Luzern-Bahn between Lucerne and Horw. Most of these tracks were already laid in a dual gauge configuration with the metre gauge tracks of the Brünig line.

Since the merger several major projects have been undertaken. In 2010, the 4,043 m (13,264 ft) Grafenort to Engelberg tunnel was constructed to replace the very steep final approach to Engelberg. Whilst still rack operated, the tunnel has a maximum gradient of 10.5% as opposed to 25%.

In late 2012, a new tunnel route was opened between Kriens Mattenhof station and the approaches to Lucerne station, on the stretch of the Brünig line also used by Engelberg trains. The tunnel replaces a less direct surface alignment, allowing the abolition of several congested level crossings and the provision of double track. A new station, Lucerne Allmend/Messe, built within the tunnel, serves the Swissporarena.
