= Kaiserstuhl OW railway station =

Railway station in Switzerland

Kaiserstuhl OW
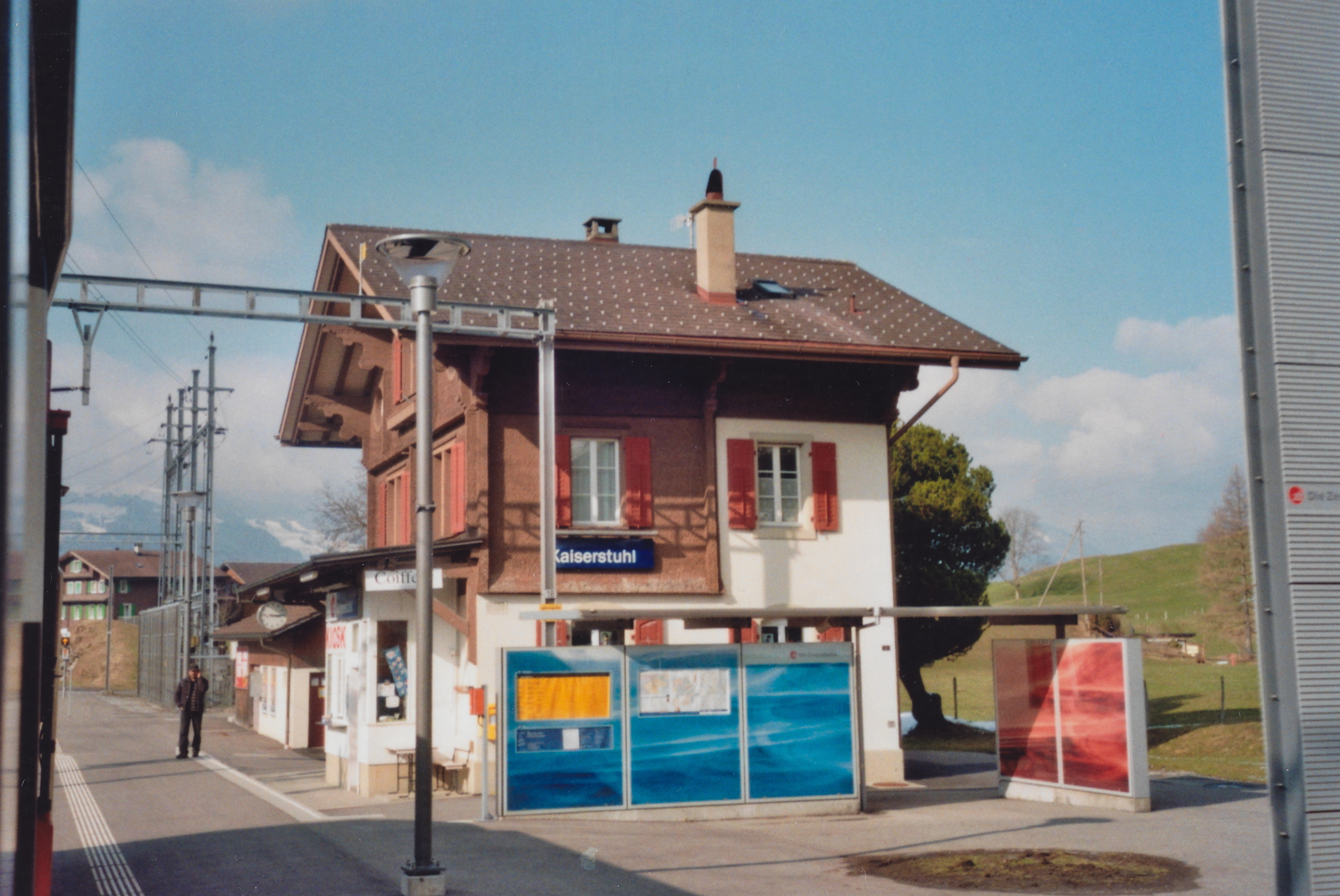
- The station building in 2012

General information
- Location: Lungern; Switzerland
- Coordinates: 46°48′52″N 8°10′32″E
- Elevation: 698 m (2,290 ft)
- Owner: Zentralbahn
- Line: Brünig line
- Train operators: Zentralbahn

Services
Preceding station	Zentralbahn	Following station
Lungern towards Interlaken Ost	Panorama Express Luzern-Interlaken Express	Giswil towards Lucerne
Location
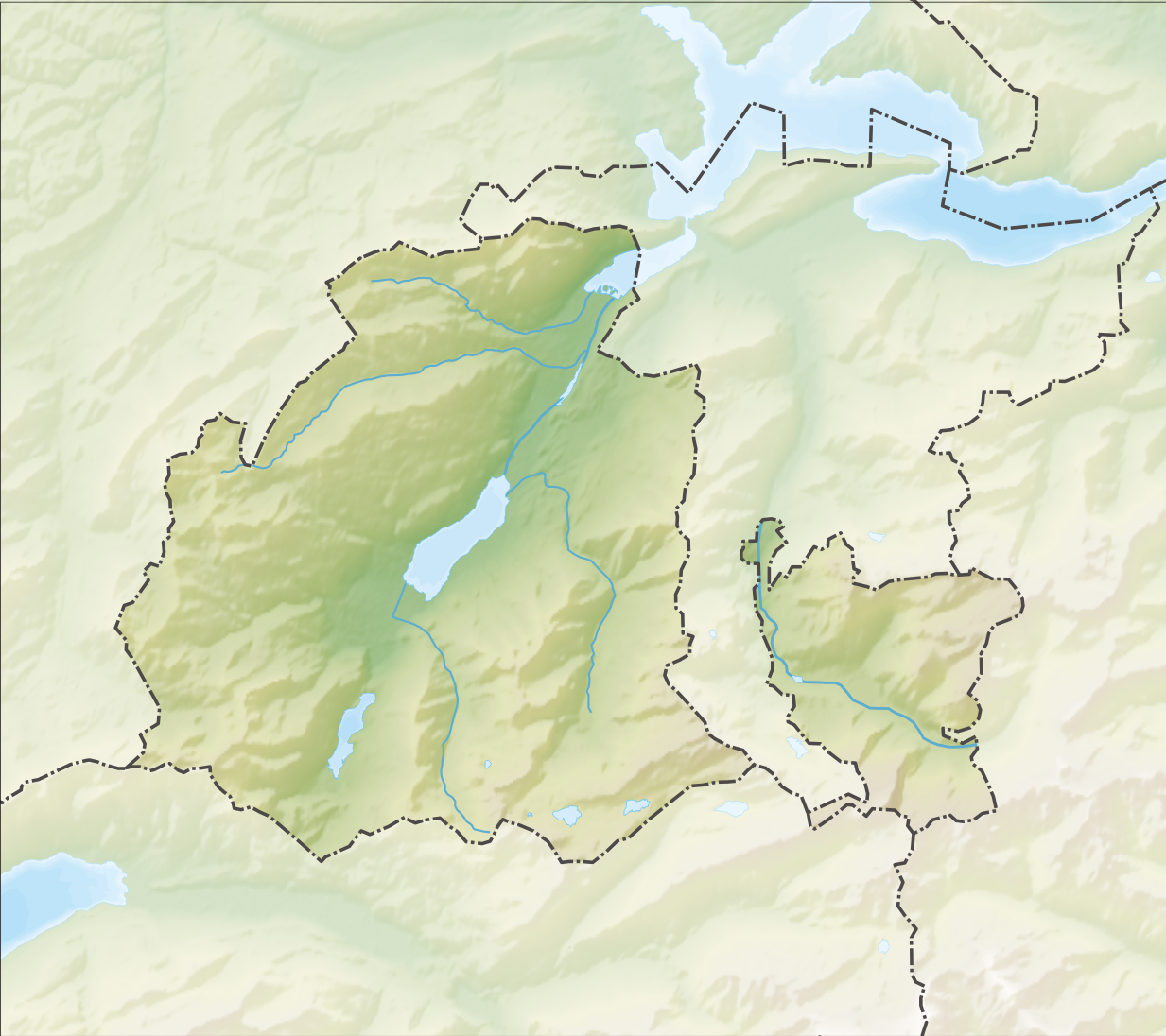
- Location within Switzerland Location within Canton of Obwalden

Kaiserstuhl OW railway station is a Swiss railway station on the Brünig line, owned by the Zentralbahn, that links Interlaken and Lucerne. The station is located by the hamlet of Kaiserstuhl, in the municipality of Lungern and the canton of Obwalden.

== Services ==
The following services stop at Kaiserstuhl OW:

- Panorama Express Luzern-Interlaken Express: hourly service between Lucerne and Interlaken Ost.
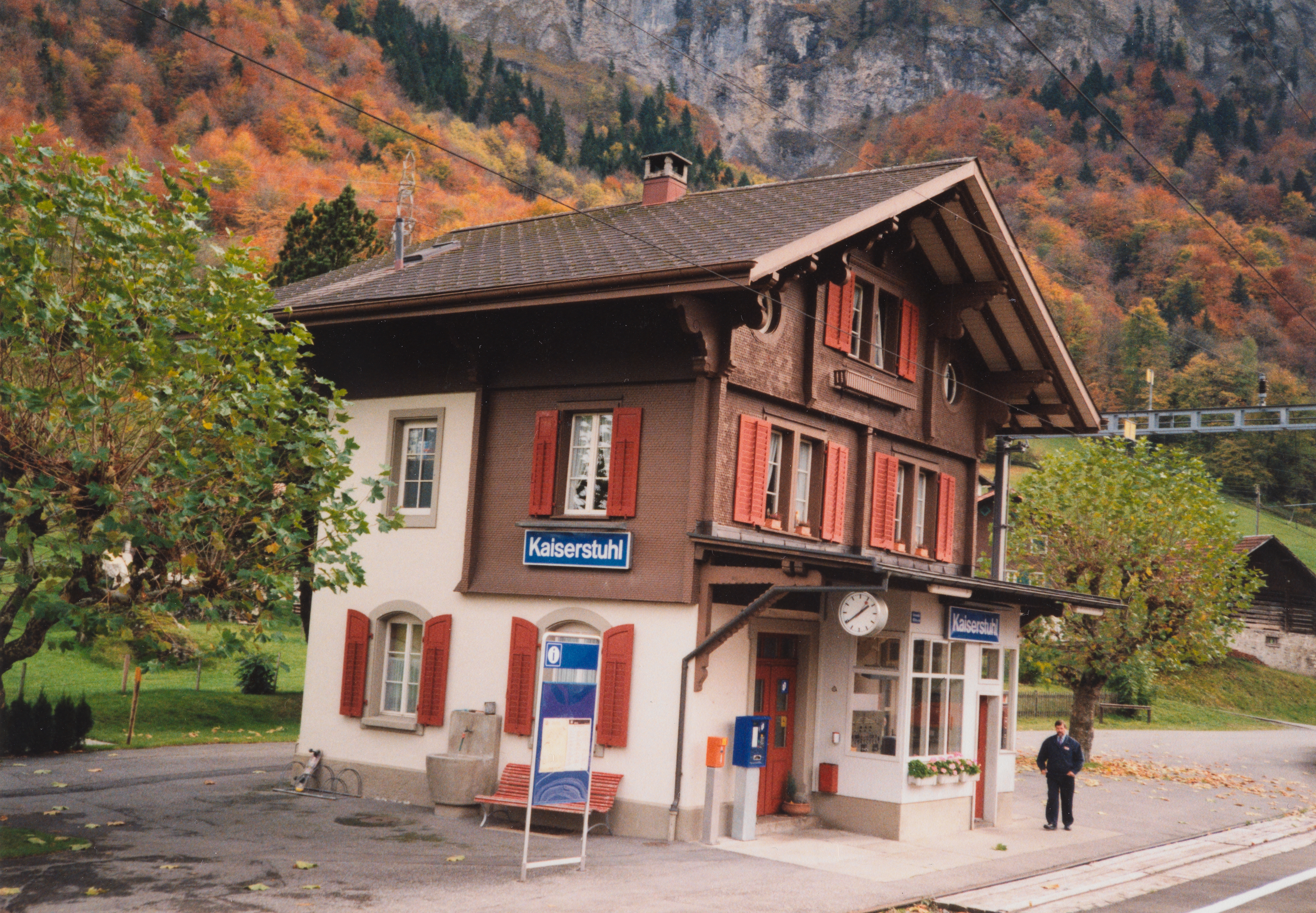
station building in 1998
