= Lungern railway station =

Railway station in Switzerland

Lungern
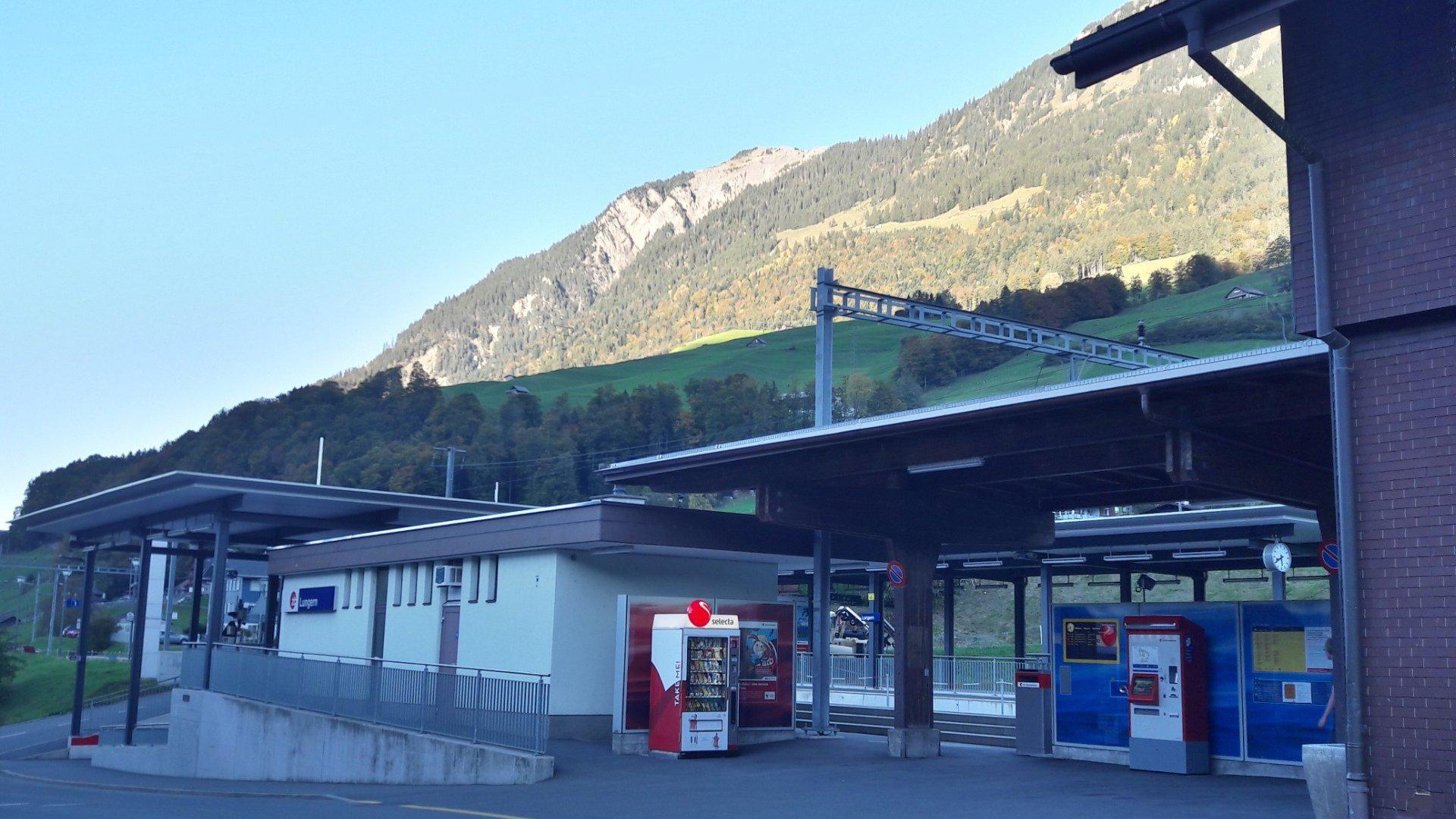
- The station in 2018

General information
- Location: Lungern; Switzerland
- Coordinates: 46°47′11″N 8°09′49″E
- Elevation: 752 m (2,467 ft)
- Owner: Zentralbahn
- Line: Brünig line
- Train operators: Zentralbahn

Services
Preceding station	Zentralbahn	Following station
Brünig-Hasliberg towards Interlaken Ost	Panorama Express Luzern-Interlaken Express	Kaiserstuhl OW towards Lucerne
Location
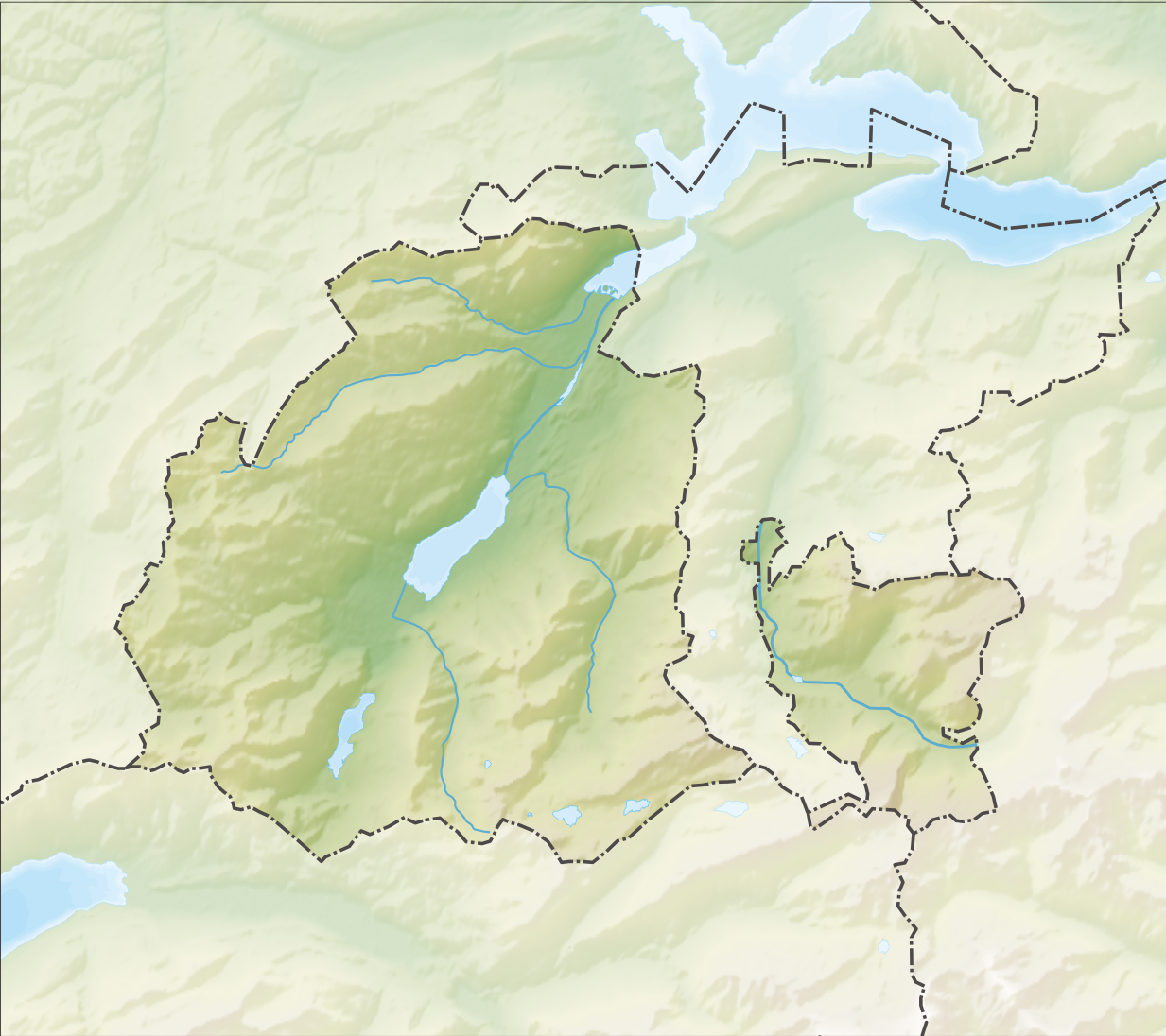
- Location within Switzerland Location within Canton of Obwalden

Lungern railway station is a Swiss railway station on the Brünig line, owned by the Zentralbahn, that links Interlaken and Lucerne. The station is located in the municipality of Lungern and the canton of Obwalden.

== Services ==
The following services stop at Lungern:

- Panorama Express Luzern-Interlaken Express: hourly service between Lucerne and Interlaken Ost.
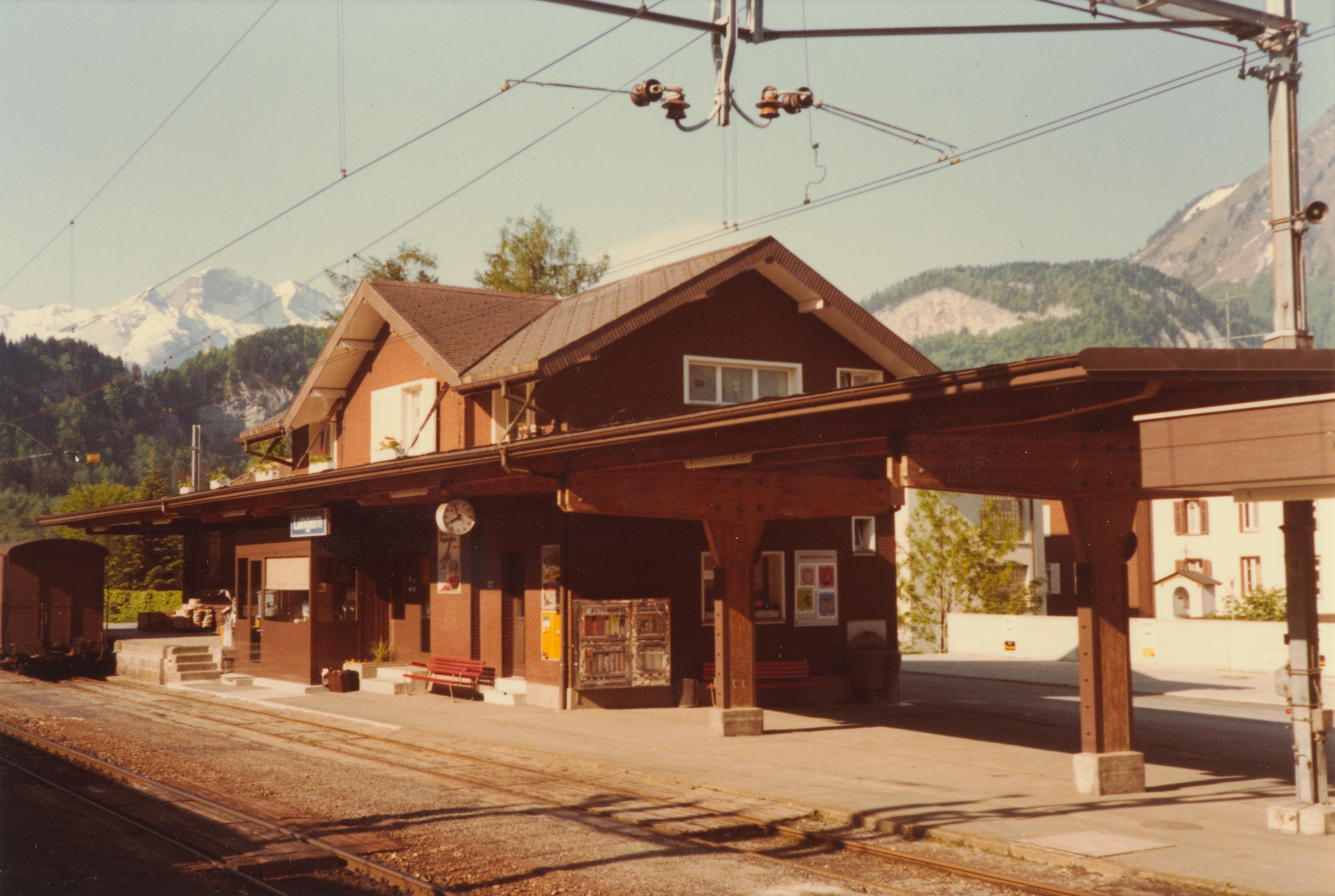
station building in 1980
