= Niederried =

Niederried may refer to:

- Niederried bei Kallnach, Switzerland
- Niederried bei Interlaken, Switzerland
