= Brünig-Hasliberg railway station =

Railway station in Switzerland

Brünig-Hasliberg
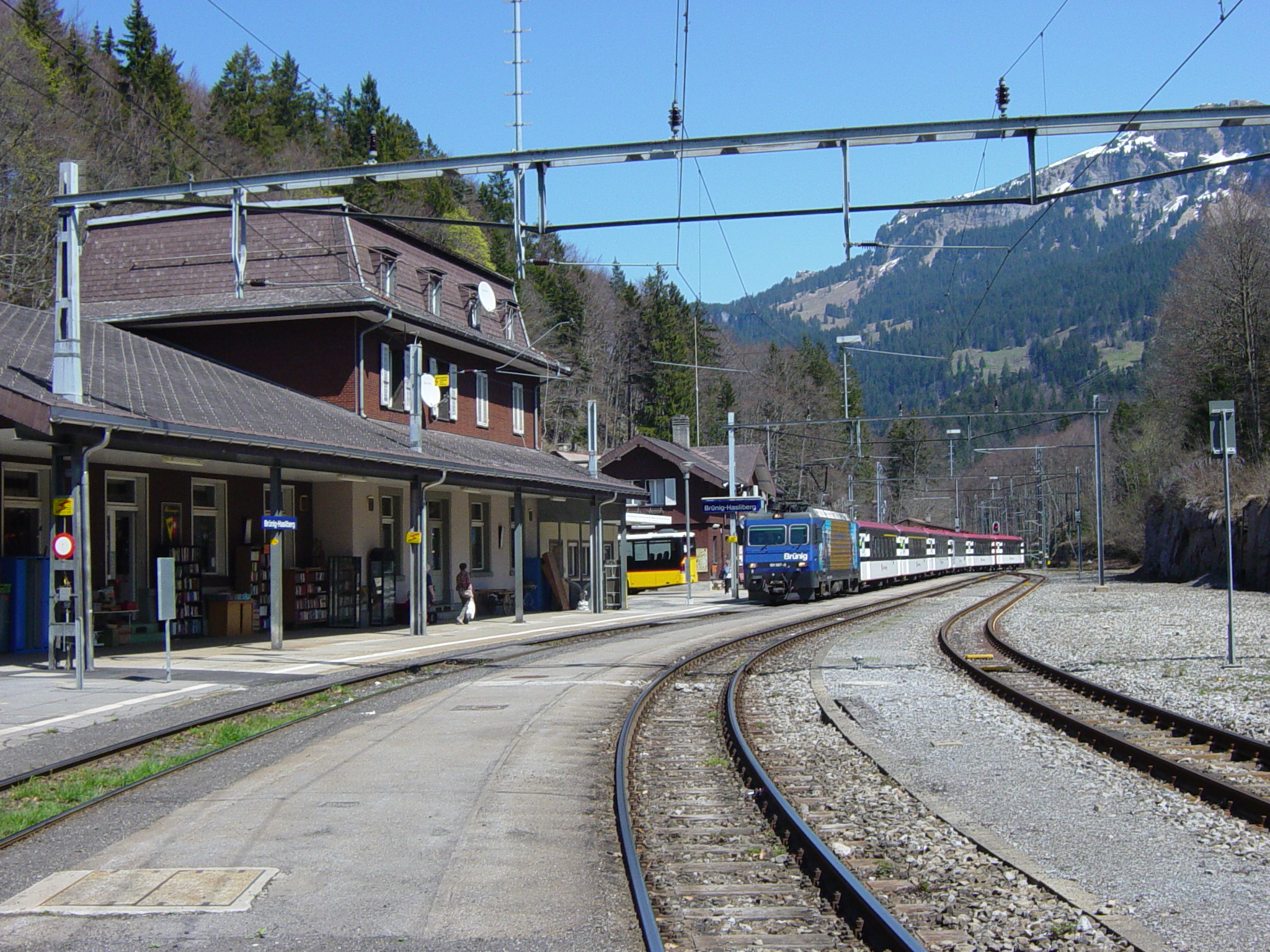
- Zentralbahn train arrives in 2007

General information
- Location: Meiringen; Switzerland
- Coordinates: 46°45′29″N 8°08′20″E
- Elevation: 1,002 m (3,287 ft)
- Owner: Zentralbahn (since 2005); Jura–Bern–Lucerne Railway (1888-1889), Jura–Simplon Railways (1890-1903); Swiss Federal Railways (1903-2004)
- Line: Brünig line
- Train operators: Zentralbahn
- Connections: PostBus Switzerland

History
- Opened: 1888

Services
Preceding station	Zentralbahn	Following station
Meiringen towards Interlaken Ost	Panorama Express Luzern-Interlaken Express	Lungern towards Lucerne
Location
- Location within Switzerland Location within Canton of Bern

Brünig-Hasliberg railway station is a Swiss railway station located at the highest point of the Brünig Pass. It is on the Brünig line, owned by the Zentralbahn, that links Interlaken and Lucerne. The station takes its name from the name of the pass, and the resort area of Hasliberg, which lies to its east. It provides an interchange with a route of PostBus Switzerland, which operates between Brienz and Hasliberg, via the station. The station is one end of a popular hiking trail to and from the summit station of the Brienz–Rothorn railway.

Politically, the station is in the municipality of Meiringen and the canton of Bern, albeit 5 km (3.1 mi) horizontally and 400 m (1,300 ft) vertically from the village of Meiringen. The border with the canton of Obwalden lies just to the Lucerne side of the station.

The station was opened in 1888 by the Jura–Bern–Lucerne Railway, along with the rest of the central section of the Brünig line between Brienz and Alpnachstad stations. Initially onward journeys to Interlaken and Lucerne were accomplished by boat and the through rail route was not completed until 1916. Trains were hauled by steam locomotives until the early 1940s, when the line was electrified. Ownership of the station was transferred to the Swiss Federal Railway in 1903, and to the Zentralbahn in 2004.

The station is situated alongside the road through the pass, and the station building and bus terminal lie between the tracks and the road. The approach tracks to the station on either side of the pass climb steeply, and are single track equipped with rack rails. The station itself has three tracks, which are not equipped with rack rails. All trains operating through the station are equipped to work using both rack and adhesion equipment.

== Services ==
The following services stop at Brünig-Hasliberg:

- Panorama Express Luzern-Interlaken Express: hourly service between Lucerne and Interlaken Ost.
- The Brünig Railway.

== Gallery ==
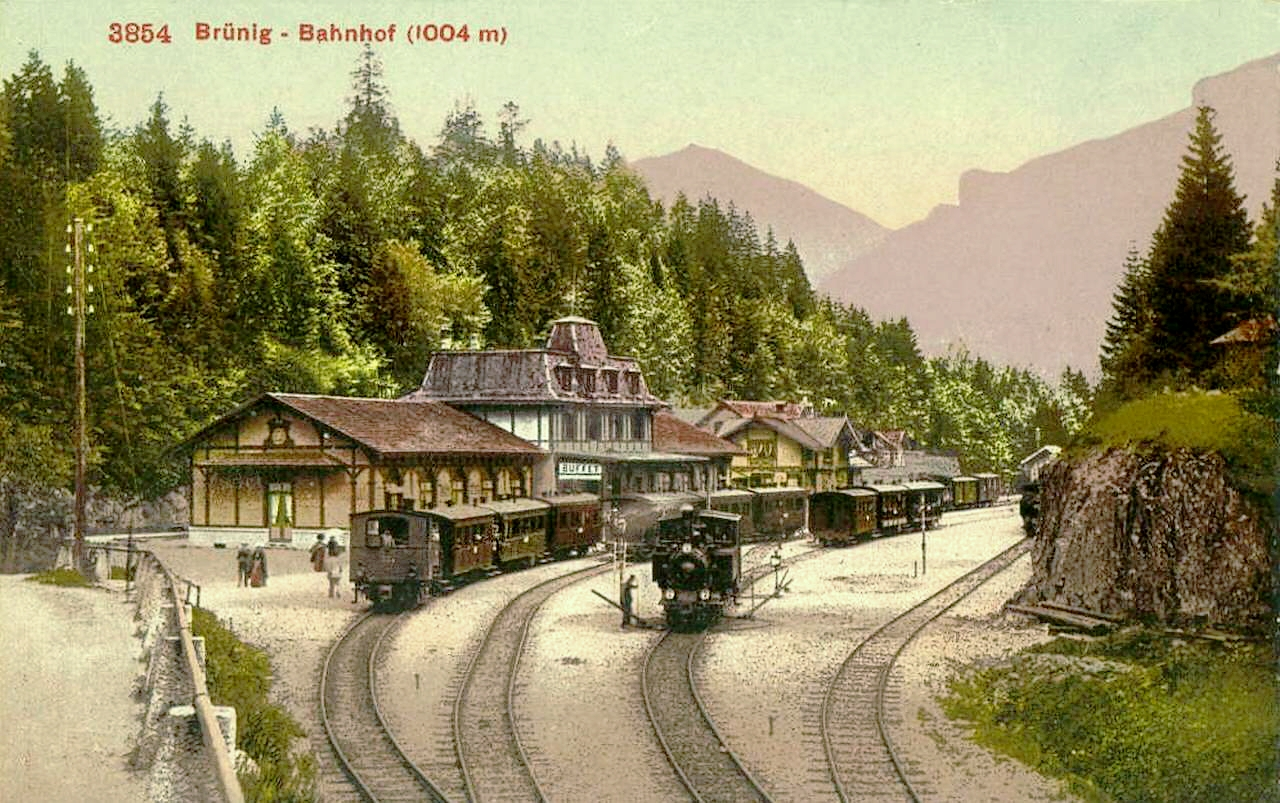
The station in 1900

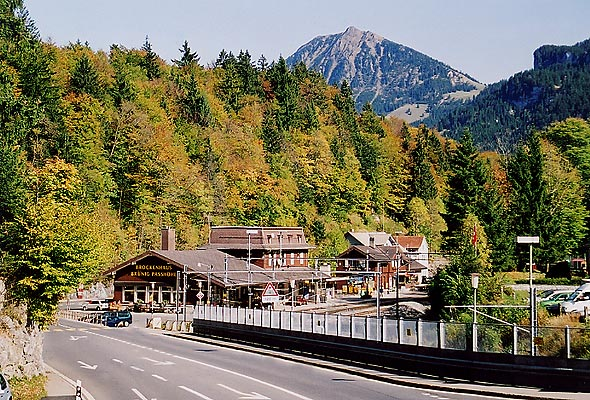
The station in 2006

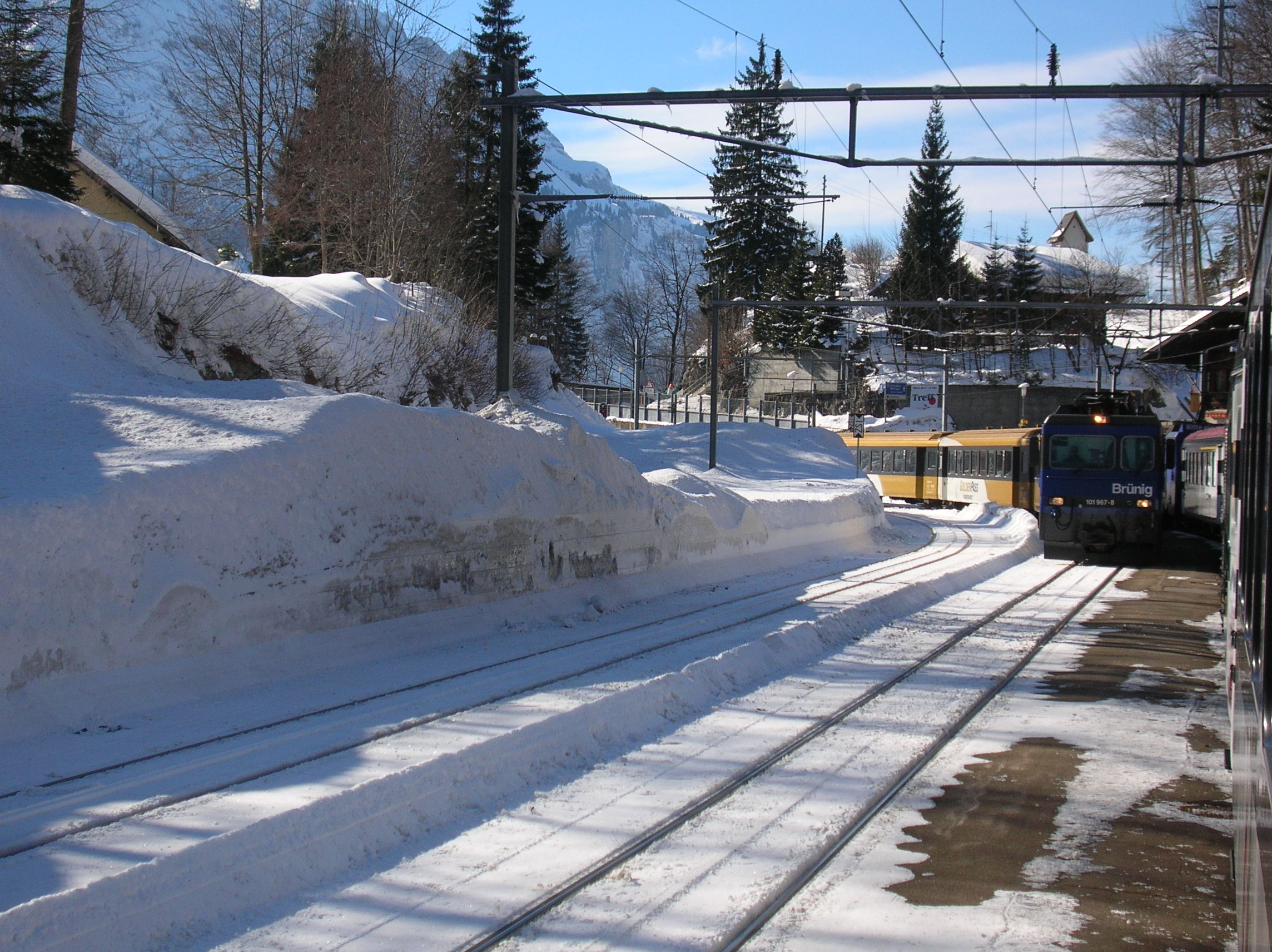
The station in winter

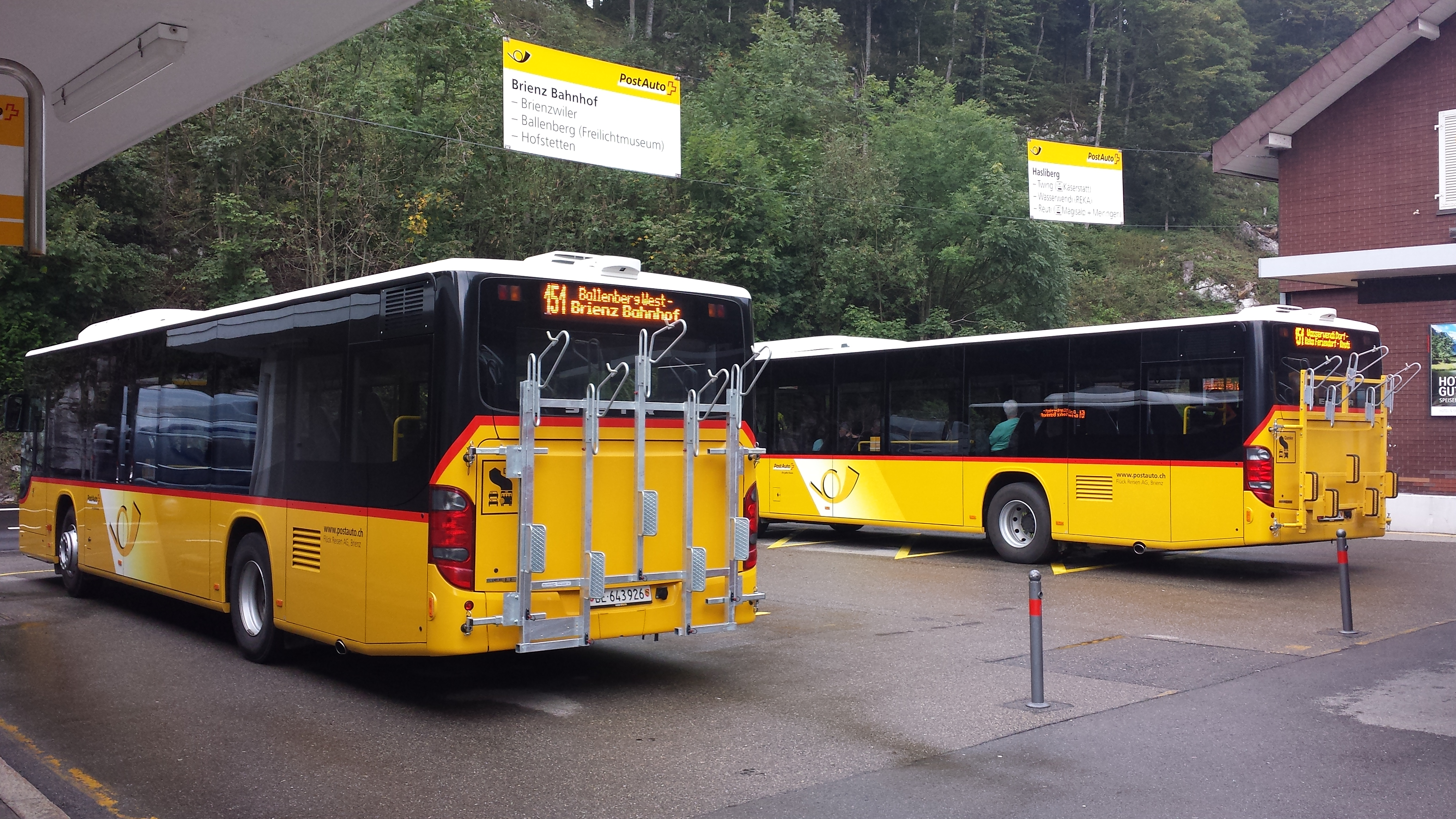
Post buses at the station
