= Ringgenberg railway station =

Railway station in Ringgenberg, Switzerland

Ringgenberg
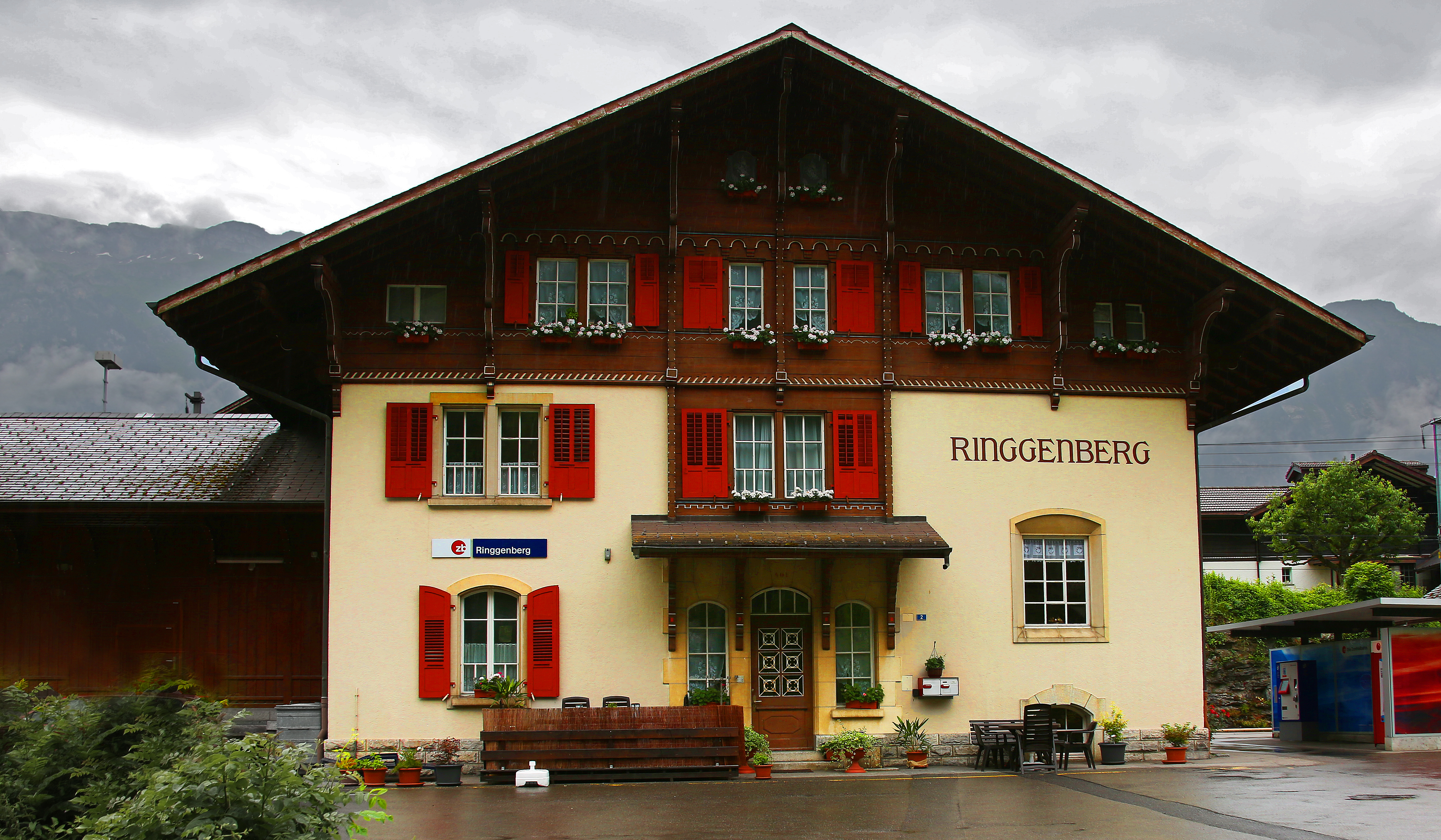
- The station building in 2018

General information
- Location: Bahnhofstrasse; Ringgenberg; Switzerland
- Coordinates: 46°42′14″N 7°53′59″E
- Elevation: 596 m (1,955 ft)
- Owner: Zentralbahn
- Line: Brünig line
- Train operators: Zentralbahn

Services
Preceding station	Zentralbahn	Following station
Interlaken Ost Terminus	Regio	Niederried towards Meiringen
Location
- Location within Switzerland Location within Canton of Bern

Ringgenberg railway station is a Swiss railway station in the village and municipality of Ringgenberg and the canton of Bern. Ringgenberg is a stop on the Brünig line, owned by the Zentralbahn, that operates between Interlaken and Lucerne.

== Services ==
The following services stop at Ringgenberg:

- Regio: hourly service between Interlaken Ost and Meiringen.
