= Niederried bei Interlaken =

- Municipality
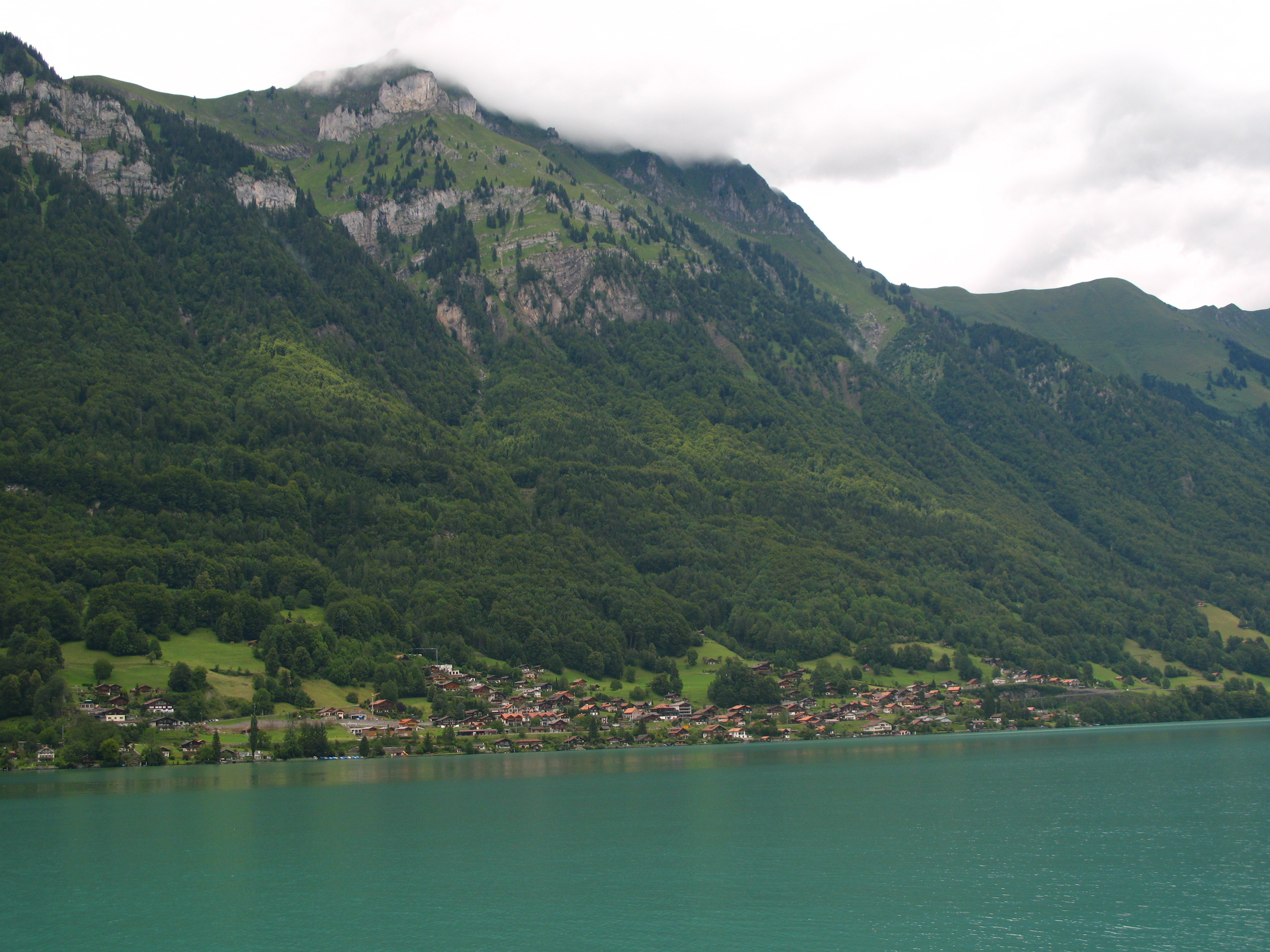

- Flag Coat of arms
- Location of Niederried bei Interlaken
- Location within Switzerland Location within Canton of Bern
- Coordinates: 46°43′N 7°55′E
- Country: Switzerland
- Canton: Bern
- District: Interlaken-Oberhasli

Government
  - Executive: Gemeinderat with 5 members
  - Mayor: Gemeindepräsident(in); Beat Studer (as of 2026)

Area
  - Total: 6.81 km^{2} (2.63 sq mi)
- Elevation: 578 m (1,896 ft)

Population (December 2020)
  - Total: 368
  - Density: 54.0/km^{2} (140/sq mi)
- Time zone: UTC+01:00 (CET)
  - Summer (DST): UTC+02:00 (CEST)
- Postal code: 3853
- SFOS number: 588
- ISO 3166 code: CH-BE
- Surrounded by: Habkern, Oberried am Brienzersee and Ringgenberg
- Website: https://www.niederried-be.ch/

Niederried bei Interlaken is a municipality in the Interlaken-Oberhasli administrative district in the canton of Bern in Switzerland.

== History ==
Aerial view (1956)

Niederried bei Interlaken is first mentioned in 1291 as Riede.

The oldest trace of a settlement in the area is a Neolithic grave in Ursisbalm and a La Tène grave at Städeli. The village only rarely appeared in historical records after its founding. Between 1411 and 1439 the Herrschaft of Ringgenberg, which included Niederried, was given to Interlaken Monastery. In 1528, the city of Bern adopted the new faith of the Protestant Reformation and began imposing it on the Bernese Oberland. The monastery unsuccessfully rebelled against the new faith. After Bern imposed its will on the Oberland, they secularized the monastery and annexed all the monastery lands. Niederried became a part of the Bernese bailiwick of Interlaken.

The village occupies a narrow strip of land between the lake and the mountains so there was very little land for farming. During the 19th century some tourists visited the village and in 1877 a pier was built for the tourist steam ships. In 1916 the last leg of the Brünig railway line was completed, which passed through the narrow village.

== Origin of the name ==
The name means "lower Ried near Interlaken." There are two explanations for the origin of the name Ried: from the Old High German riod, reoth ("clearing") or the Swiss German Ried (land growing reeds and swampgrass).

== Geography ==
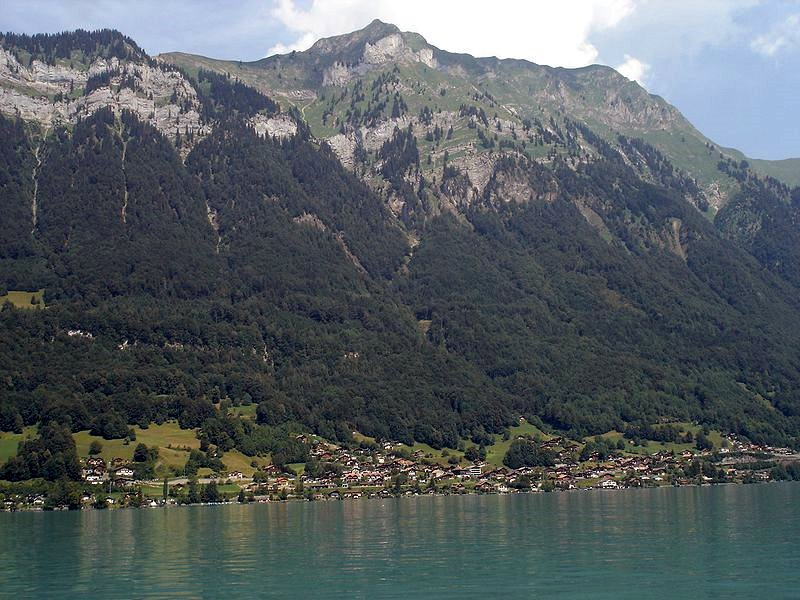
Niederried village on the shore of Lake Brienz

Niederried bei Interlaken has an area of 4.28 km^{2} (1.65 sq mi). Of this area, 0.92 km^{2} (0.36 mi^{2}) or 21.4% is used for agricultural purposes, while 2.36 km^{2} (0.91 mi^{2}) or 55.0% is forested. Of the rest of the land, 0.31 km^{2} (0.12 mi^{2}) or 7.2% is settled (buildings or roads), 0.02 km^{2} (4.9 acres) or 0.5% is either rivers or lakes and 0.68 km^{2} (0.26 mi^{2}) or 15.9% is unproductive land.

Of the built up area, housing and buildings made up 4.9% and transportation infrastructure made up 2.3%. Out of the forested land, 50.6% of the total land area is heavily forested and 3.7% is covered with orchards or small clusters of trees. Of the agricultural land, 8.2% is pastures and 13.3% is used for alpine pastures. All the water in the municipality is flowing water. Of the unproductive areas, 11.4% is unproductive vegetation and 4.4% is too rocky for vegetation.

It lies in the Bernese Oberland on the north shore of Lake Brienz. The highest point is the Suggiture (2,085 m (6,841 ft)) at the northern edge of the municipality.

On 31 December 2009 Amtsbezirk Interlaken, the municipality's former district, was dissolved. On the following day, 1 January 2010, it joined the newly created Verwaltungskreis Interlaken-Oberhasli.

== Coat of arms ==
The blazon of the municipal coat of arms is Argent a Semi Ibex rampant Sable langued Gules and a Base Vert. The green field appears on the coats of arms of both Niederried and Oberried. It symbolizes the marsh (German: ried) from which the municipalities take their names. On the coat of arms of Niederried the green field appears below (German: nieder) the ibex, while on Oberried it is above (German: ober). This makes the coat of arms an example of canting arms.

== Demographics ==
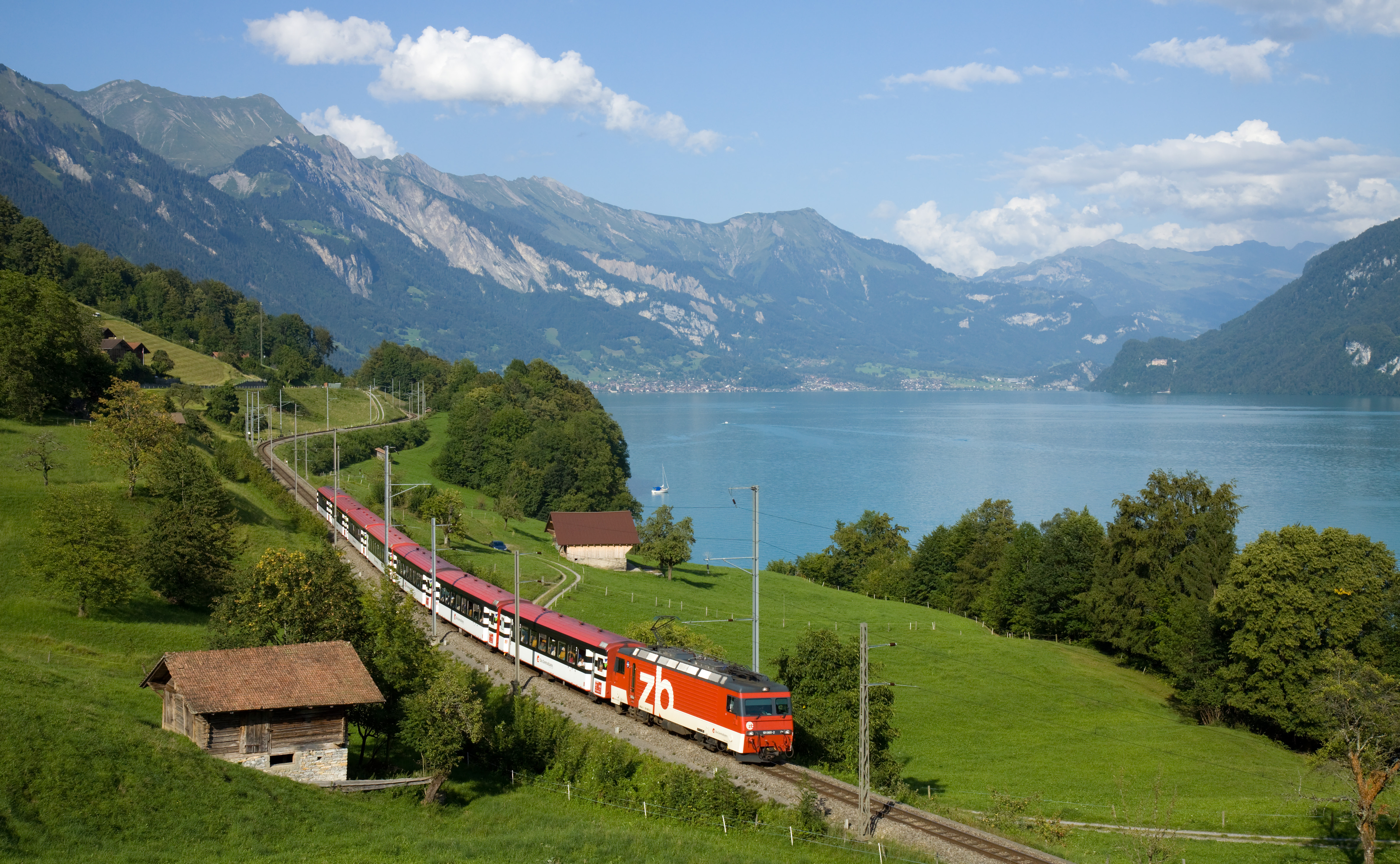
The Brünig railway runs through Niederried

Niederried bei Interlaken has a population (as of December 2020) of 368. As of 2010, 12.7% of the population are resident foreign nationals. Over the last 10 years (2000-2010) the population has changed at a rate of -4.9%. Migration accounted for -8%, while births and deaths accounted for -0.3%.

Most of the population (as of 2000) speaks German (316 or 92.4%) as their first language, Italian is the second most common (10 or 2.9%) and Albanian is the third (8 or 2.3%).

As of 2008, the population was 49.4% male and 50.6% female. The population was made up of 141 Swiss men (42.5% of the population) and 23 (6.9%) non-Swiss men. There were 149 Swiss women (44.9%) and 19 (5.7%) non-Swiss women. Of the population in the municipality, 106 or about 31.0% were born in Niederried bei Interlaken and lived there in 2000. There were 138 or 40.4% who were born in the same canton, while 41 or 12.0% were born somewhere else in Switzerland, and 46 or 13.5% were born outside of Switzerland.

As of 2010, children and teenagers (0–19 years old) make up 17.8% of the population, while adults (20–64 years old) make up 60.2% and seniors (over 64 years old) make up 22%.

As of 2000, there were 130 people who were single and never married in the municipality. There were 170 married individuals, 26 widows or widowers and 16 individuals who are divorced.

As of 2000, there were 50 households that consist of only one person and 13 households with five or more people. In 2000, a total of 140 apartments (49.3% of the total) were permanently occupied, while 123 apartments (43.3%) were seasonally occupied and 21 apartments (7.4%) were empty. As of 2010, the construction rate of new housing units was 3 new units per 1000 residents. The vacancy rate for the municipality, in 2011, was 0.9%.

The historical population is given in the following chart:

== Politics ==
In the 2011 federal election the most popular party was the Swiss People's Party (SVP) which received 40.9% of the vote. The next three most popular parties were the Conservative Democratic Party (BDP) (15.8%), the Social Democratic Party (SP) (11.4%) and the Green Party (9.8%). In the federal election, a total of 119 votes were cast, and the voter turnout was 47.2%.

== Economy ==
As of 2011, Niederried bei Interlaken had an unemployment rate of 1.25%. As of 2008, there were a total of 44 people employed in the municipality. Of these, there were 10 people employed in the primary economic sector and about 4 businesses involved in this sector. 12 people were employed in the secondary sector and there were 3 businesses in this sector. 22 people were employed in the tertiary sector, with 10 businesses in this sector. There were 167 residents of the municipality who were employed in some capacity, of which females made up 38.3% of the workforce.

In 2008 there were a total of 35 full-time equivalent jobs. The number of jobs in the primary sector was 5, all of which were in agriculture. The number of jobs in the secondary sector was 12 of which 10 or (83.3%) were in manufacturing and 2 (16.7%) were in construction. The number of jobs in the tertiary sector was 18. In the tertiary sector; 2 or 11.1% were in wholesale or retail sales or the repair of motor vehicles, 8 or 44.4% were in a hotel or restaurant, 3 or 16.7% were technical professionals or scientists, 2 or 11.1% were in education.

In 2000, there were 24 workers who commuted into the municipality and 126 workers who commuted away. The municipality is a net exporter of workers, with about 5.3 workers leaving the municipality for every one entering. Of the working population, 14.4% used public transportation to get to work, and 62.9% used a private car.

== Religion ==
From the 2000 census, 36 or 10.5% were Roman Catholic, while 237 or 69.3% belonged to the Swiss Reformed Church. Of the rest of the population, there were 5 members of an Orthodox church (or about 1.46% of the population), and there were 16 individuals (or about 4.68% of the population) who belonged to another Christian church. There were 14 (or about 4.09% of the population) who were Islamic. There was 1 person who was Buddhist, 1 person who was Hindu and 1 individual who belonged to another church. 16 (or about 4.68% of the population) belonged to no church, are agnostic or atheist, and 23 individuals (or about 6.73% of the population) did not answer the question.

== Education ==
In Niederried bei Interlaken about 134 or (39.2%) of the population have completed non-mandatory upper secondary education, and 19 or (5.6%) have completed additional higher education (either university or a Fachhochschule). Of the 19 who completed tertiary schooling, 73.7% were Swiss men, 15.8% were Swiss women.

The Canton of Bern school system provides one year of non-obligatory Kindergarten, followed by six years of Primary school. This is followed by three years of obligatory lower Secondary school where the students are separated according to ability and aptitude. Following the lower Secondary students may attend additional schooling or they may enter an apprenticeship.

During the 2010–11 school year, there were a total of 9 students attending one primary class.

As of 2000, there were 73 students in Niederried bei Interlaken who came from another municipality, while 7 residents attended schools outside the municipality.

== Transport ==
Niederried is served by Niederried station on the Brünig line. It is served by an hourly Regio train between Interlaken and Meiringen.
