= Niederried railway station =

Railway station in Switzerland

Niederried
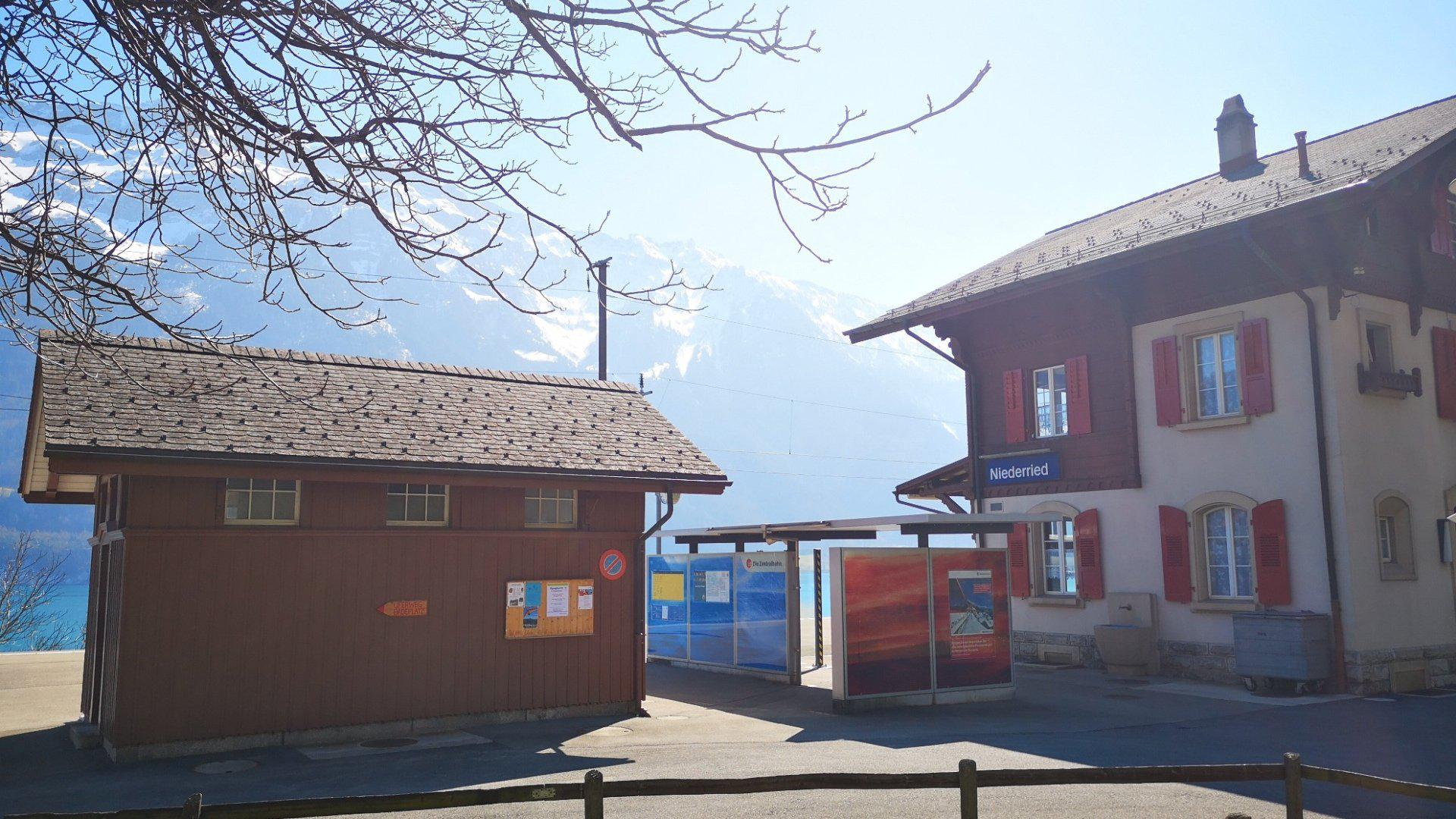
- The station in 2018

General information
- Location: Bahnhofstrasse; Niederried bei Interlaken; Switzerland
- Coordinates: 46°42′59″N 7°55′43″E
- Elevation: 578 m (1,896 ft)
- Owner: Zentralbahn
- Line: Brünig line
- Train operators: Zentralbahn

Services
Preceding station	Zentralbahn	Following station
Ringgenberg towards Interlaken Ost	Regio	Oberried am Brienzersee towards Meiringen
Location
- Location within Switzerland Location within Canton of Bern

Niederried railway station is a Swiss railway station in the village and municipality of Niederried bei Interlaken and the canton of Bern. Niederried is a stop on the Brünig line, owned by the Zentralbahn, that operates between Interlaken and Lucerne.

== Services ==
The following services stop at Niederried:

- Regio: hourly service between Interlaken Ost and Meiringen.
