= Brünig railway line =

Narrow gauge railway line in Switzerland

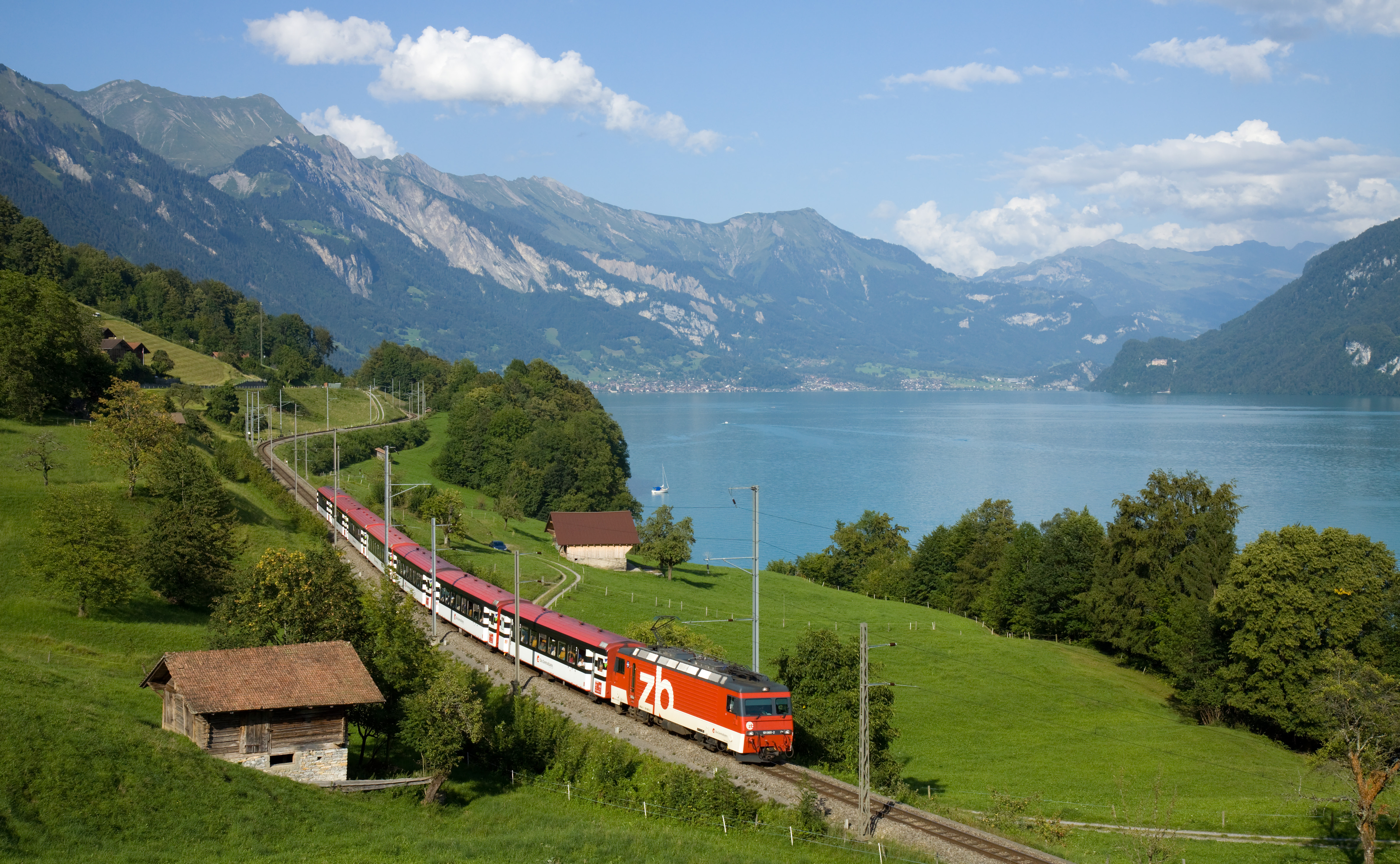
- An InterRegio train following the Lake Brienz shoreline. The locomotive is a rack-and-adhesion type HGe 101.

Overview
- Owner: Zentralbahn

Service
- Operator(s): Zentralbahn

Technical
- Line length: 74 km (46 mi)
- Rack system: Riggenbach
- Track gauge: 1,000 mm (3 ft 3 3/8 in) metre gauge
- Electrification: 15 kV 16.7 Hz AC overhead line
- Maximum incline: 12% (rack); 3% (adhesion)

The Brünig railway line (German: Brünigbahn) is a Swiss narrow gauge railway line that links Lucerne, in central Switzerland, with Interlaken, in the Bernese Oberland. The line runs via Alpnachstad, Giswil, Meiringen and Brienz, and passes over the Brünig Pass, using sections of rack railway to overcome the gradients, but with most of the line operated by normal adhesion methods.

The line is 74 kilometres (46 mi) long. It opened in stages between 1888 and 1916, and was, between 1903 and 2004, the only narrow gauge line of the Swiss Federal Railways. Today the line forms part, along with the Luzern–Stans–Engelberg line, of the Zentralbahn company. The line is served by Panorama Express trains that operate the full length of the line, with regular (non-rack) Regio trains between Interlaken and Meiringen, and Lucerne S-Bahn trains between Lucerne and Giswil. The section between Hergiswil and Lucerne is shared with the Luzern–Stans–Engelberg line.

== History ==
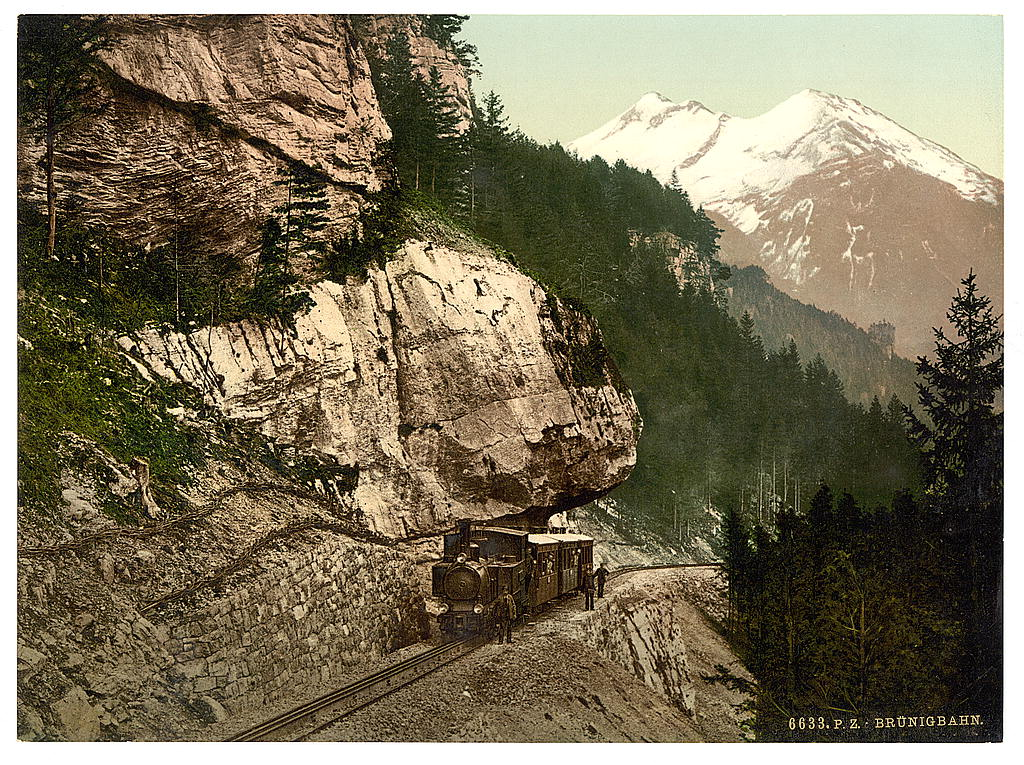
An early train on the climb from Meiringen to the Brünig pass

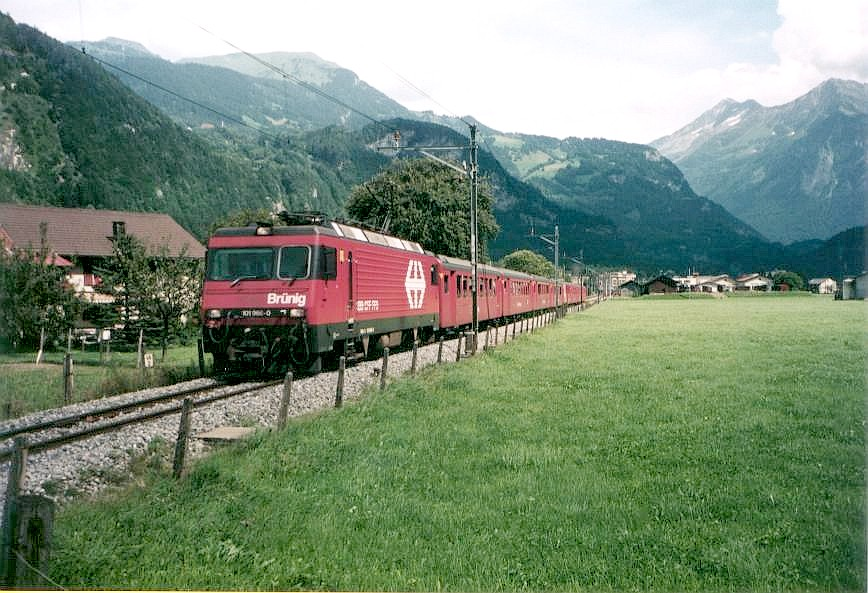
A train near Meiringen, under Swiss Federal Railways ownership.

The line was constructed by the Jura–Bern–Lucerne Railway (JBL), which opened the section between Brienz over the Brünig Pass to Alpnachstad in 1888. Initially, the line connected to steamships on Lake Brienz and Lake Lucerne, but was extended in 1889 from Alpnachstad to Lucerne, giving connections to the rest of the Swiss railway network. In 1891, JBL became part of the Jura–Simplon Railway (JS).

In 1903, the JS became part of the Swiss Federal Railways (SBB). Only in 1916 did the last section of the current line, between Brienz and Interlaken, open. This allowed through trains to operate from Lucerne to Interlaken, and provided an easy interchange with trains to Bern and beyond.

The line was electrified in 1941 and 1942, using the standard Swiss main line system of 15 kV 16.7 Hz AC supplied by overhead line. The electrification led to a significant acceleration of services, with typical through journey times reduced from over 3 hours to 2 hours.

In 1964, a junction was constructed at Hergiswil with the Luzern–Stans–Engelberg Railway (LSE), and from that date trains of the LSE used Brünig line tracks to reach Lucerne station. On 30 June 2004, the Swiss Federal Council empowered the SBB to sell the Brünig line to the Zentralbahn company, formed by the LSE, and which now owns both railways. The takeover took effect on 1 January 2005.

In late 2012, a new tunnel route was opened between Kriens Mattenhof station and the approaches to Lucerne station. The tunnel replaces a less direct surface alignment, allowing the abolition of several congested level crossings and the provision of double track. A new station, Lucerne Allmend/Messe, built within the tunnel, serves the Swissporarena.

== Operation ==
=== Route ===
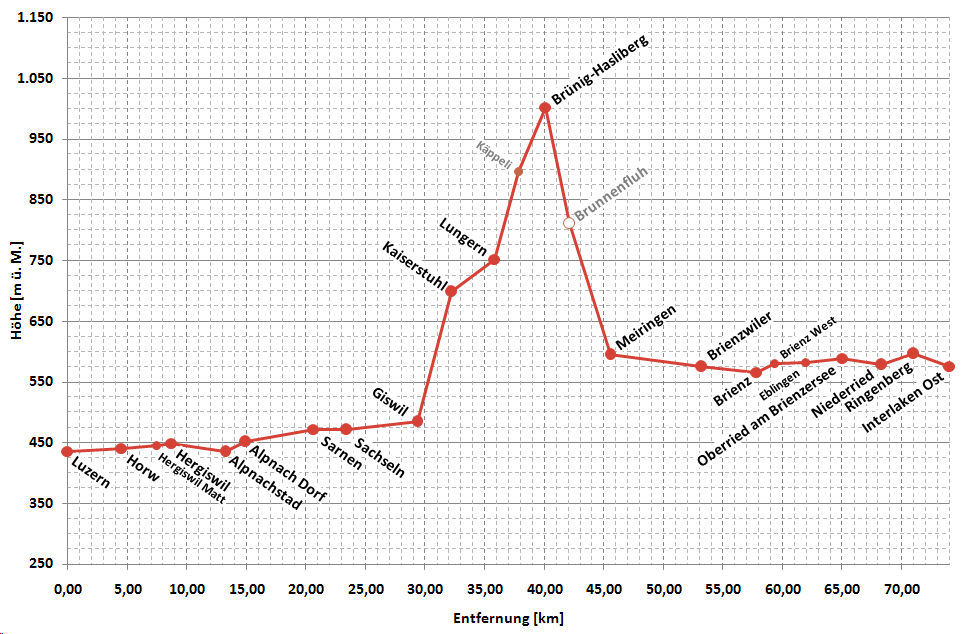
Gradient profile of the line

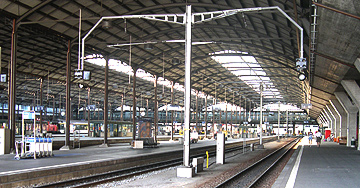
Start of the line; the Brünig line terminal platforms in Lucerne station.

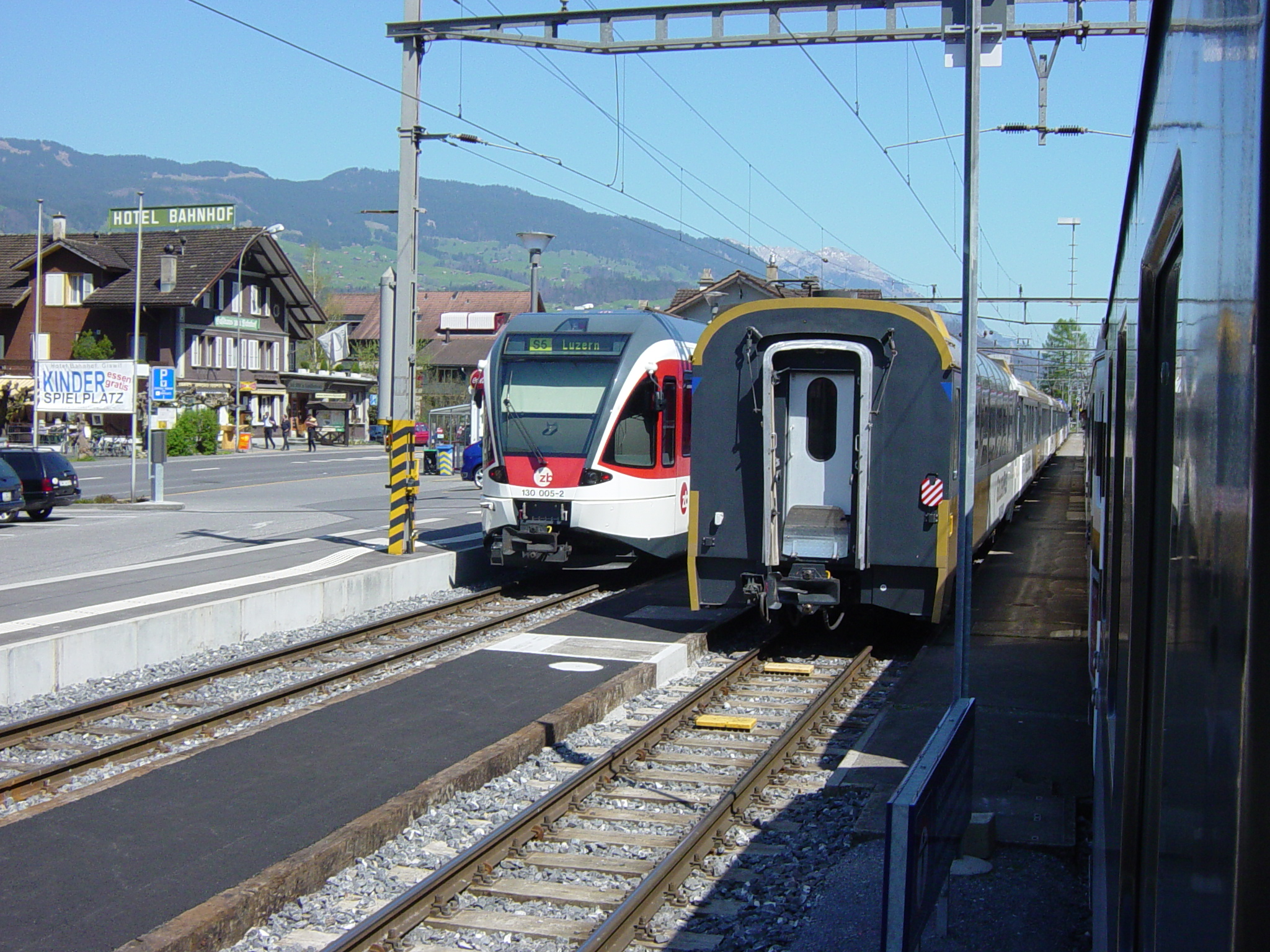
Giswil station is the terminus of the S-Bahn service from Lucerne.

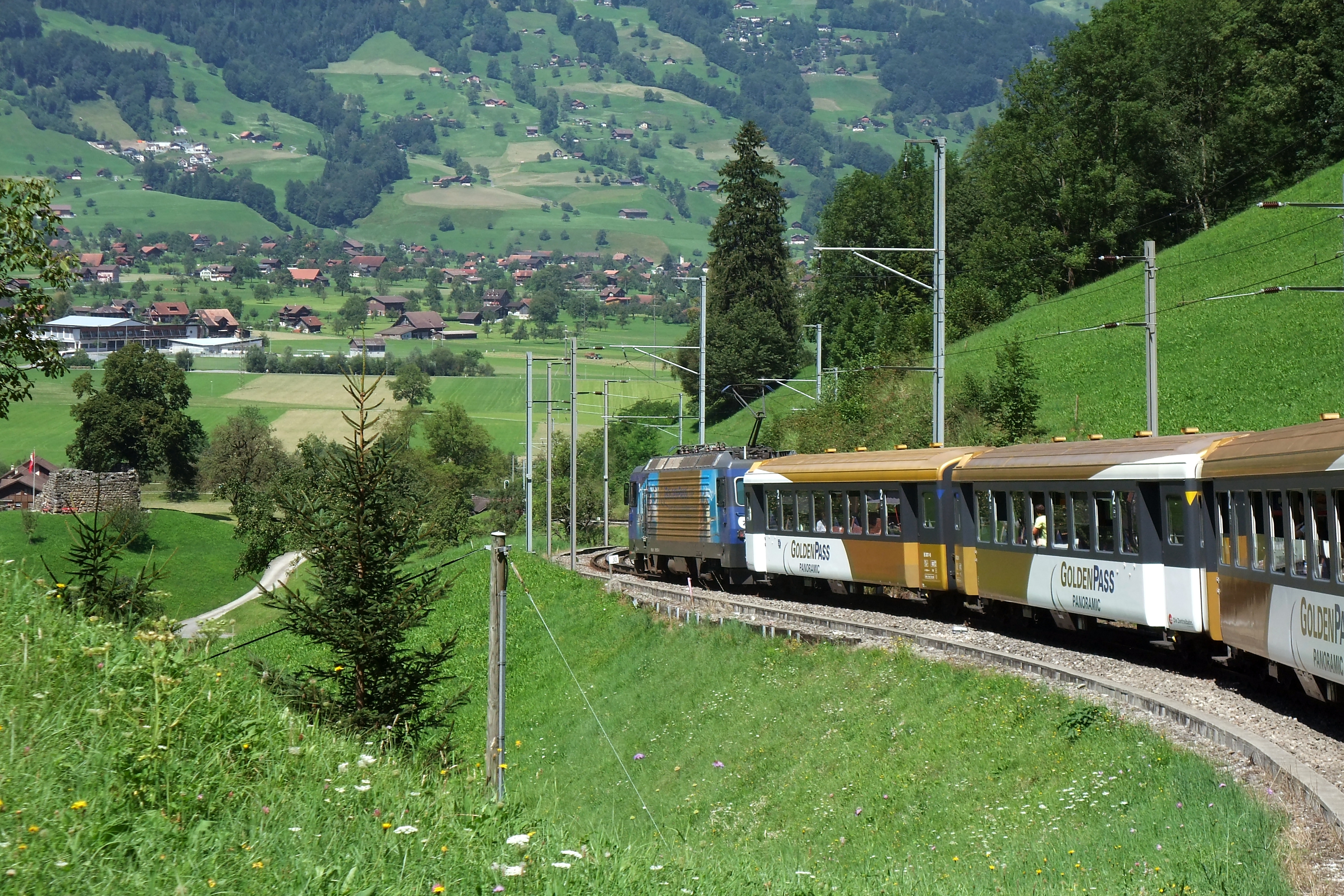
A GoldenPass Line liveried train descending the rack section from the Brünig Pass towards Giswil.

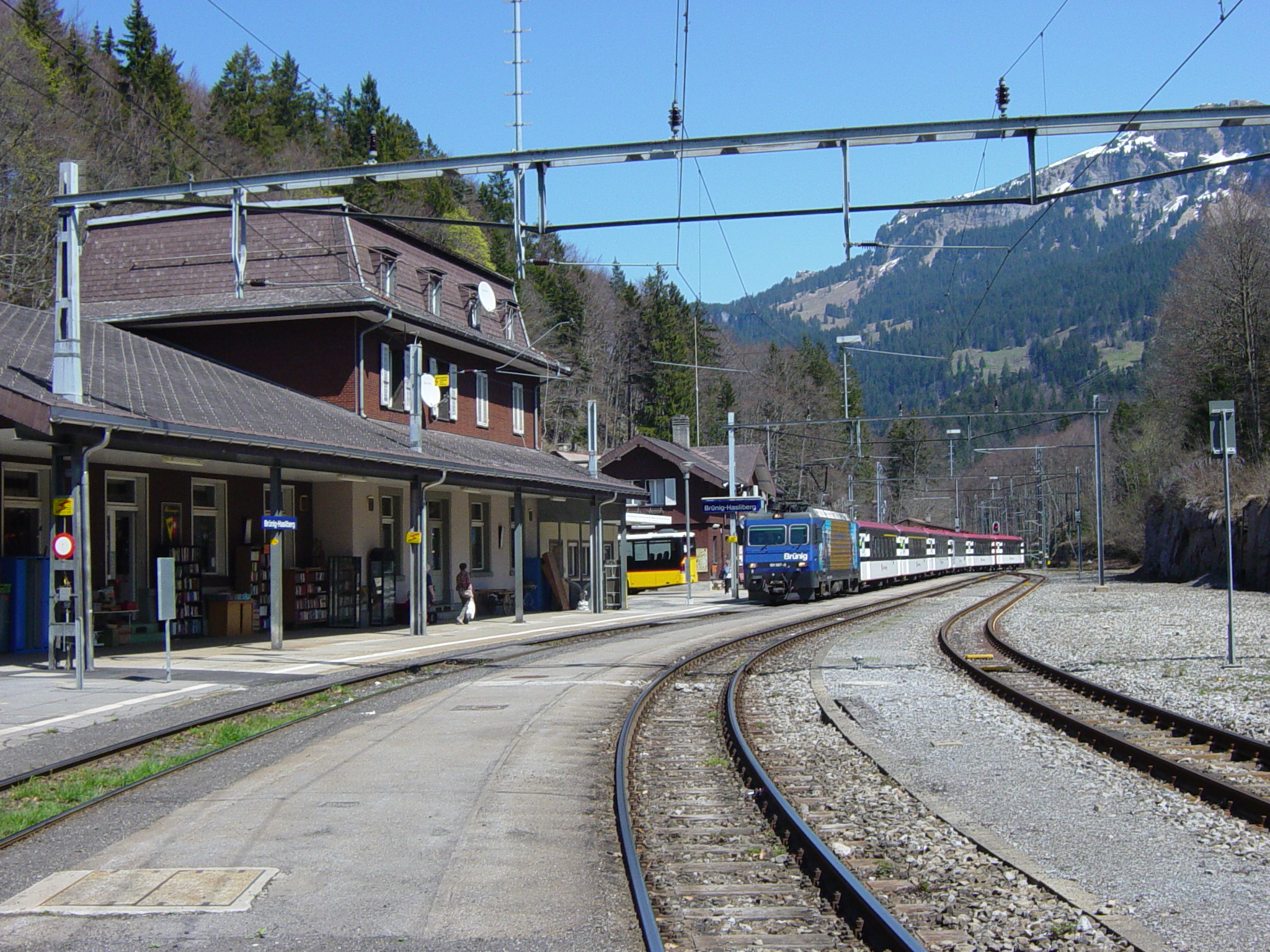
Brünig-Hasliberg station is the summit of the line, in the Brünig Pass.

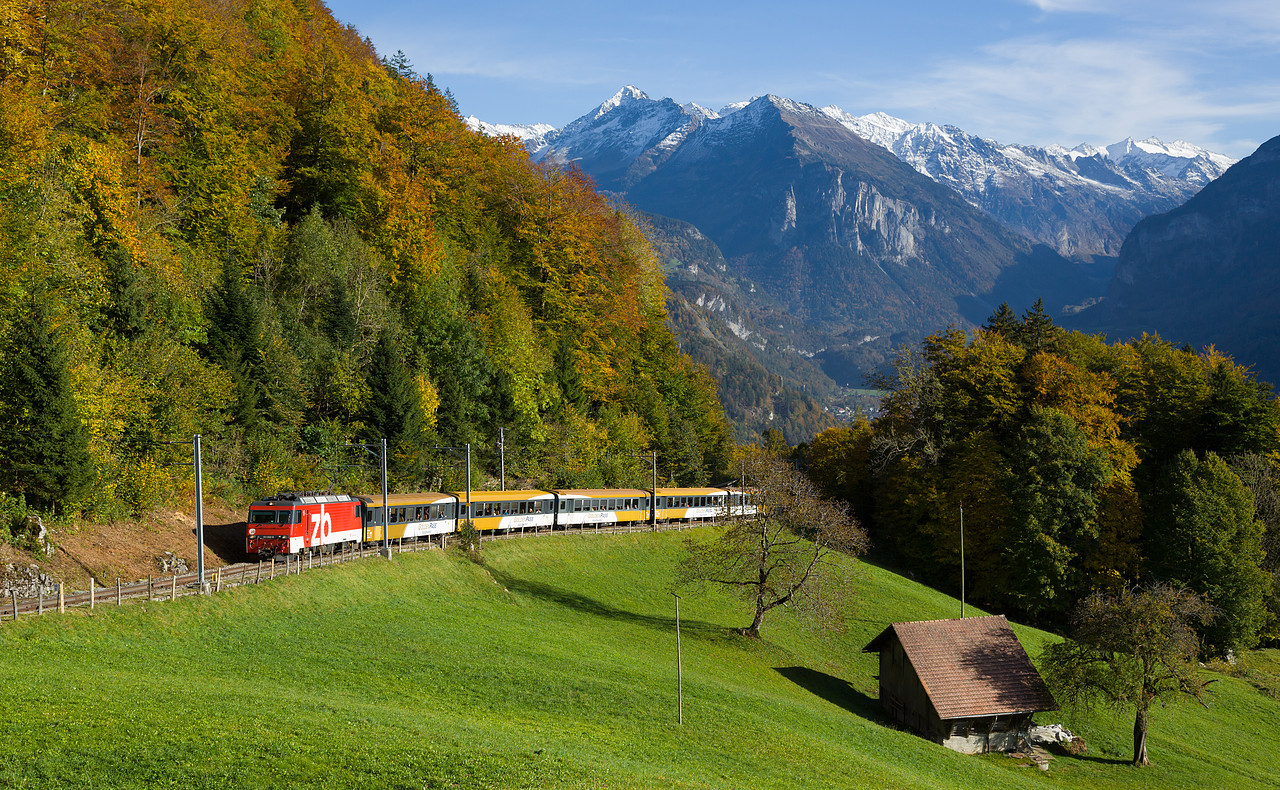
A train climbing the rack section from Meiringen to the Brünig Pass.

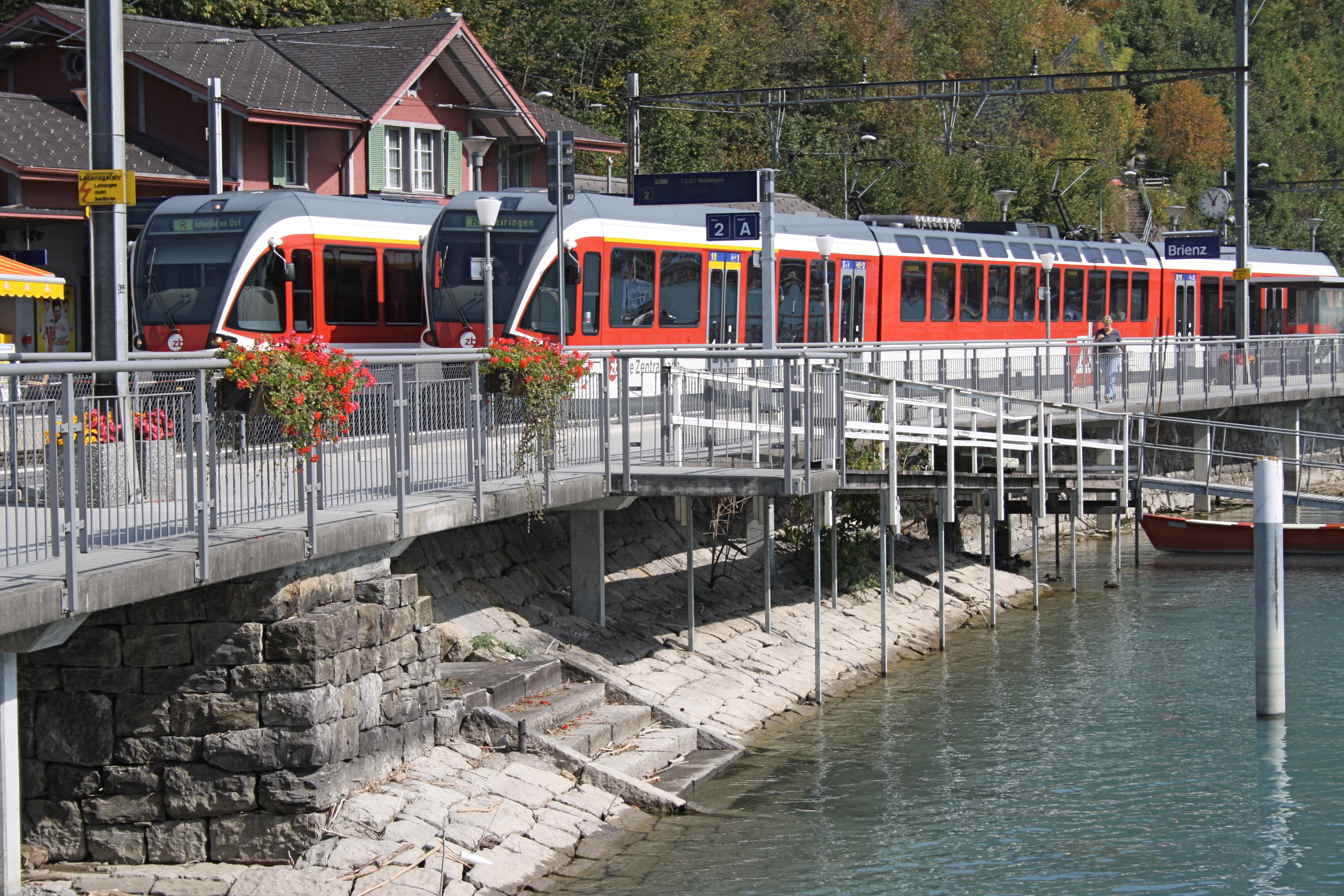
Regio trains, made up of Stadler SPATZ units, passing at Brienz.

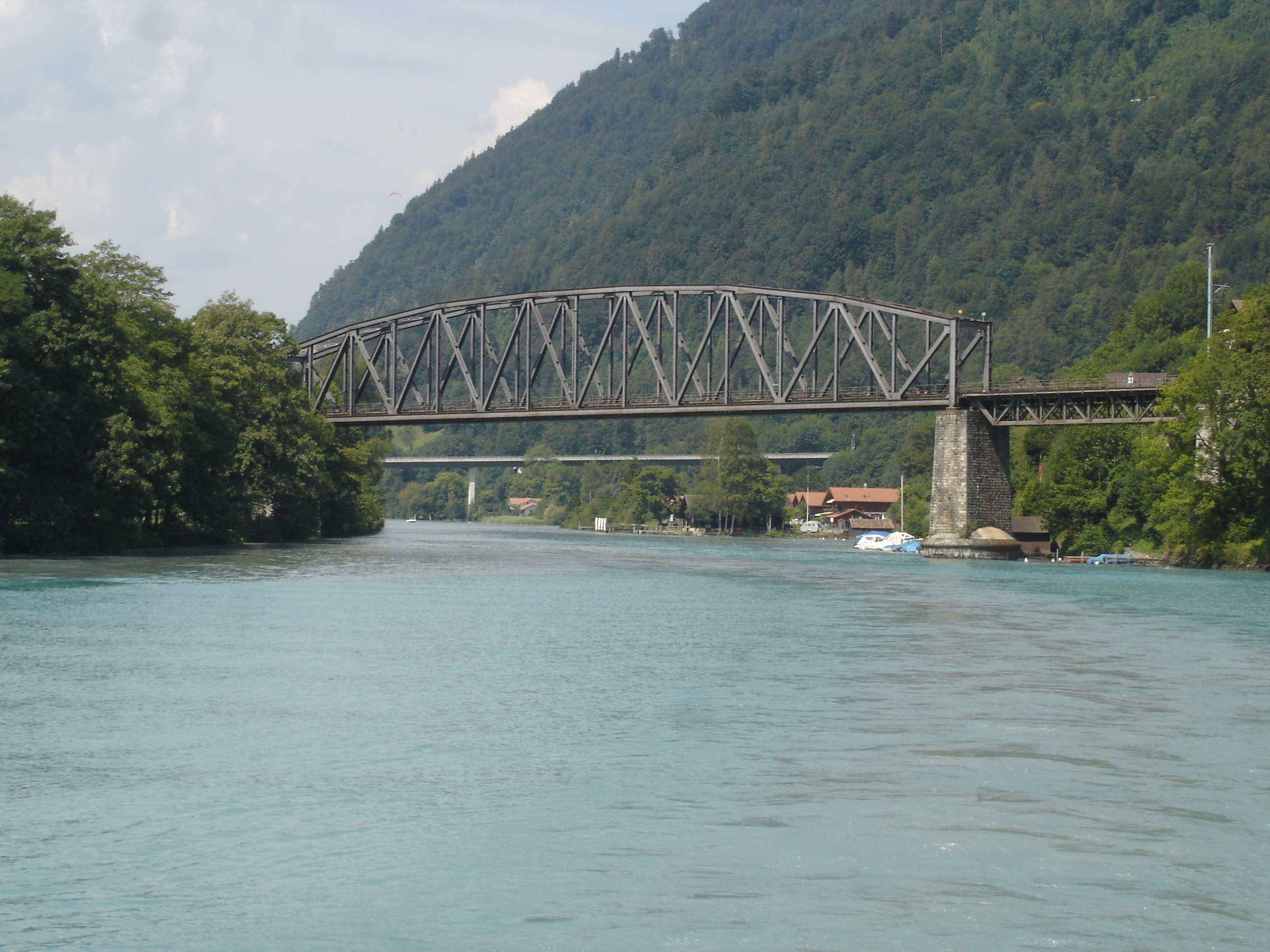
Bridge carrying the line over the Aare into Interlaken Ost.

The line begins at Lucerne station, one of Switzerland's principal railway stations and which is shared with the standard gauge lines of the Swiss Federal Railways. The metre gauge terminal platforms, and the first section of the line, are shared with trains of the Luzern–Stans–Engelberg line. Shortly after leaving the station, the line enters a tunnel under Lucerne's southern suburbs as far as Kriens Mattenhof station. From here the line runs on the surface to Hergiswil, where the Luzern–Stans–Engelberg line diverges.

From Hergiswil station the Brünig line runs through the Lopper I tunnel, under a shoulder of Mount Pilatus, to Alpnachstad, which is the starting point of the Pilatus Railway. The two lines are of different gauges, and there is no track connection. From Alpnachstad station, the Brünig line follows the Sarner Aa and Lake Sarnen to Giswil. Beyond Giswil station, the line's first rack section then allows the line to climb to Kaiserstuhl station. From here, the runs through the upper basin of the Sarner Aa and alongside Lake Lungern as far as Lungern. This is the steepest adhesion worked section of the line.

After Lungern station, a second rack section lifts the line to its summit at Brünig-Hasliberg station in the Brünig Pass. Beyond the pass, the line descends its third and final rack section, down the steep side of the valley of the Aare, to Meiringen. This is the steepest rack worked section of the line. At Meiringen station, the Brünig line reverses direction with trains both entering and leaving the station from the west end. The Meiringen–Innertkirchen Railway (MIB) connects here, leaving the station from its eastern end. Although there is a track connection between the two lines, they are electrically incompatible, and no through trains operate.

From Meiringen to Brienz the line runs close to the Aare, in that river's valley. At Brienz station, the starting point of the Brienz Rothorn Railway is beside the Brünig railway station. The two lines are of different gauges, and there is no track connection. Beyond Brienz, the Brünig line runs along the northern shore of Lake Brienz, in a section often affected by landslides. Finally the line crosses the Aare on a high bridge, so built in order to allow lake shipping to reach Interlaken. It then passes over the standard gauge access to the BLS AG works at Bönigen, before descending into its terminus at Interlaken Ost station, which is shared with the BLS AG and Berner Oberland Railway (BOB). There is a physical connection with the BOB, which is also metre gauge, but again the lines are electrically incompatible and no through trains operate.

=== Stations ===
- Lucerne
- Lucerne Allmend/Messe
- Kriens Mattenhof
- Horw
- Hergiswil Matt
- Hergiswil
- Alpnachstad
- Alpnach Dorf
- Sarnen
- Sachseln
- Ewil Maxon
- Giswil
- Kaiserstuhl OW
- Lungern
- Brünig-Hasliberg
- Meiringen
- Brienzwiler
- Brienz
- Brienz West
- Ebligen
- Oberried am Brienzersee
- Niederried
- Ringgenberg
- Interlaken Ost

=== Infrastructure ===
The line is built to metre gauge (3 ft 3 3/8 in gauge), and operates on the rack and adhesion principle, using sections of Riggenbach rack to overcome the steeper gradients encounted on the approaches to the Brünig pass, but with most of the line operated by normal adhesion methods. The line is electrified using the standard Swiss main line system of 15 kV, 16 2/3 Hz AC, delivered by overhead line. The line has maximum gradients of 12%, using the rack, and 3%, using simple adhesion.

The route is 74 kilometres (46 mi) long. It consists mostly of single track with passing loops at most stations, although the section between Lucerne and Hergiswil, which is shared with the Luzern–Stans–Engelberg line, is mostly double track. For much of the distance between Lucerne and Horw, one of these two tracks is dual gauge, allowing standard gauge freight trains to reach the industrial areas along the line, and the Eichhof brewery.

The steam locomotives G 3/4 and HG 3/3 can operate on the rack sections only in the forward direction, hence turntables are needed. The historic, hand-operated turntable in Meiringen was dismantled in 2011, but was rebuilt at a new location in 2013. Similarly, the historic turntable in Giswil was moved to another location in the course of the renewal of the station in 2013.

=== Services ===
The line is served by hourly InterRegio trains that operate the full length of the line, taking just under two hours for the journey. These through trains stop at all stations between Meiringen and Giswil, where they provide the only service, but only at a selected stations between Interlaken and Meiringen, and between Lucerne and Giswil.

The through trains are supplemented by local trains at each end of the route. An hourly Regio train operates between Interlaken and Meiringen, stopping at all stations. Between Lucerne and Giswil, twice-hourly trains of the Lucerne S-Bahn line S5 provide a stopping service. The section of line between Hergiswil and Lucerne is shared with trains on the Luzern–Stans–Engelberg line, including a further InterRegio train per hour, and the twice-hourly Lucerne S-Bahn line S4.
