= Panorama Express =

Train category in Switzerland

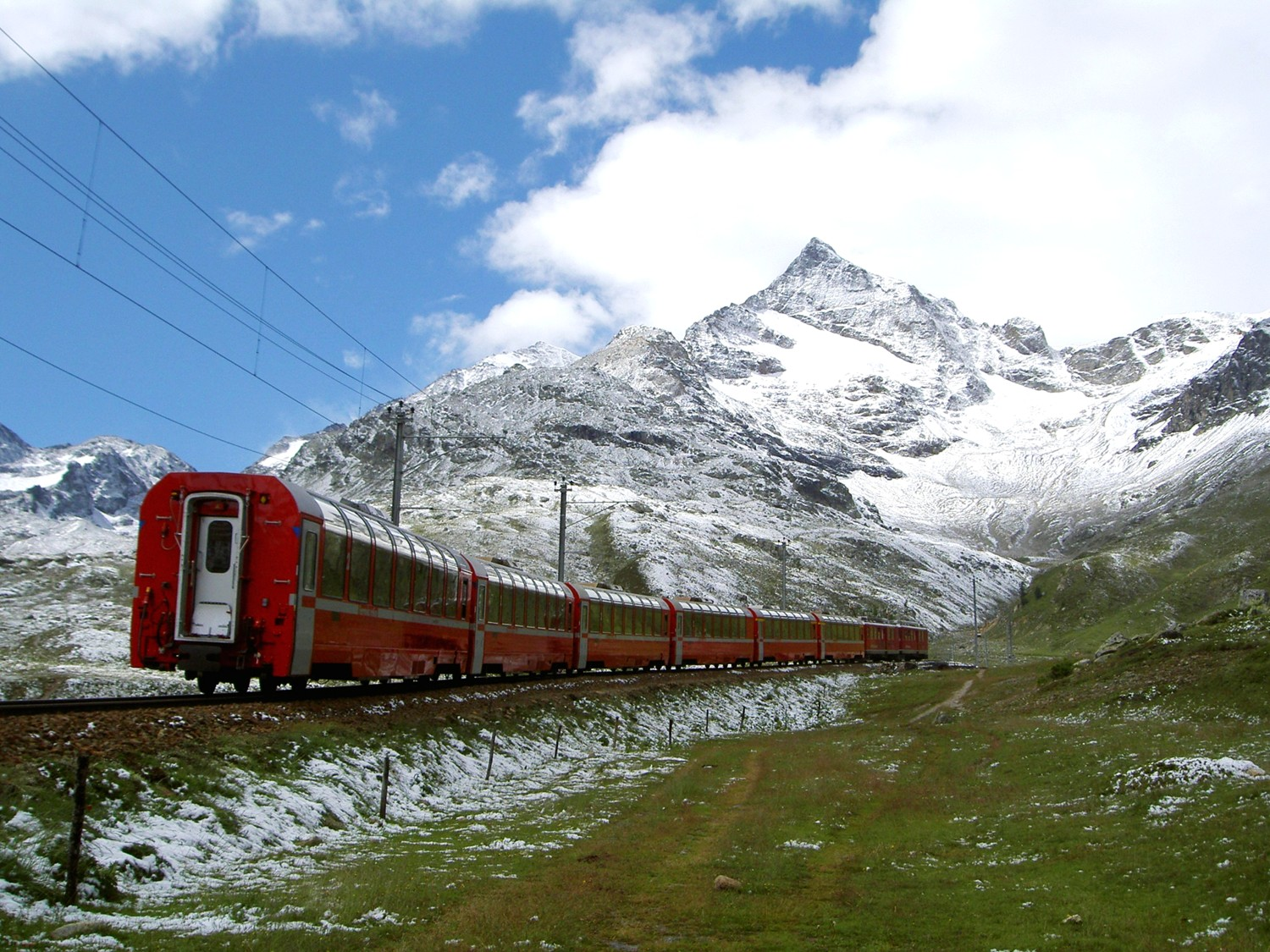
Bernina Express

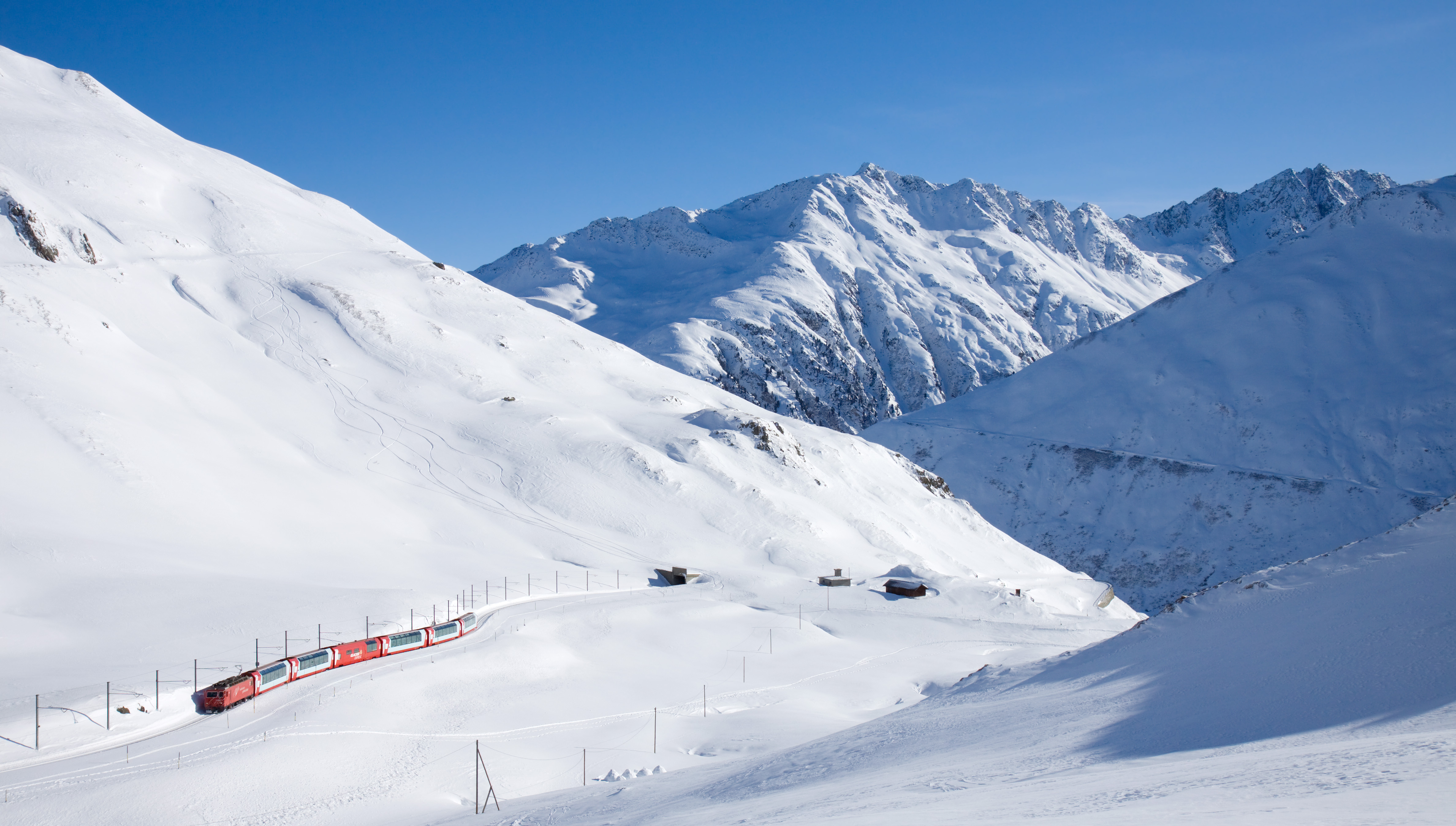
Glacier Express

Panorama Express, abbreviated PE, is a special category of long-distance train in Switzerland. It was introduced with the December 2019 timetable change, and is generally used to denote tourism-focused services.

Characteristics of a Panorama Express can include first- and second-class seating, air-conditioned coaches, and a limited number of intermediate stops. Advance reservations are often required but not necessarily compulsory.

== Examples ==
The following is a list of trains that operate under the PE category:

- Bernina Express, between Chur and Tirano (Italy)
- Glacier Express, between St. Moritz and Zermatt
- GoldenPass Express, a luxury train that operates between Montreux and Interlaken Ost
- Gotthard Panorama Express, which uses the Gotthard Railway between Arth-Goldau / Flüelen and Lugano (combines with a voyage on Lake Lucerne between Lucerne and Flüelen)
- Luzern-Interlaken Express, which uses the Brünig Railway between Lucerne and Interlaken Ost

Previously, the Voralpen Express also ran as a PE, but it was subsequently changed to InterRegio (IR).

== See also ==
- Heritage railways and funiculars in Switzerland
- Rail transport in Switzerland
- Luxury train
