= Luzern Allmend/Messe railway station =

Railway station in Switzerland

Luzern Allmend/Messe
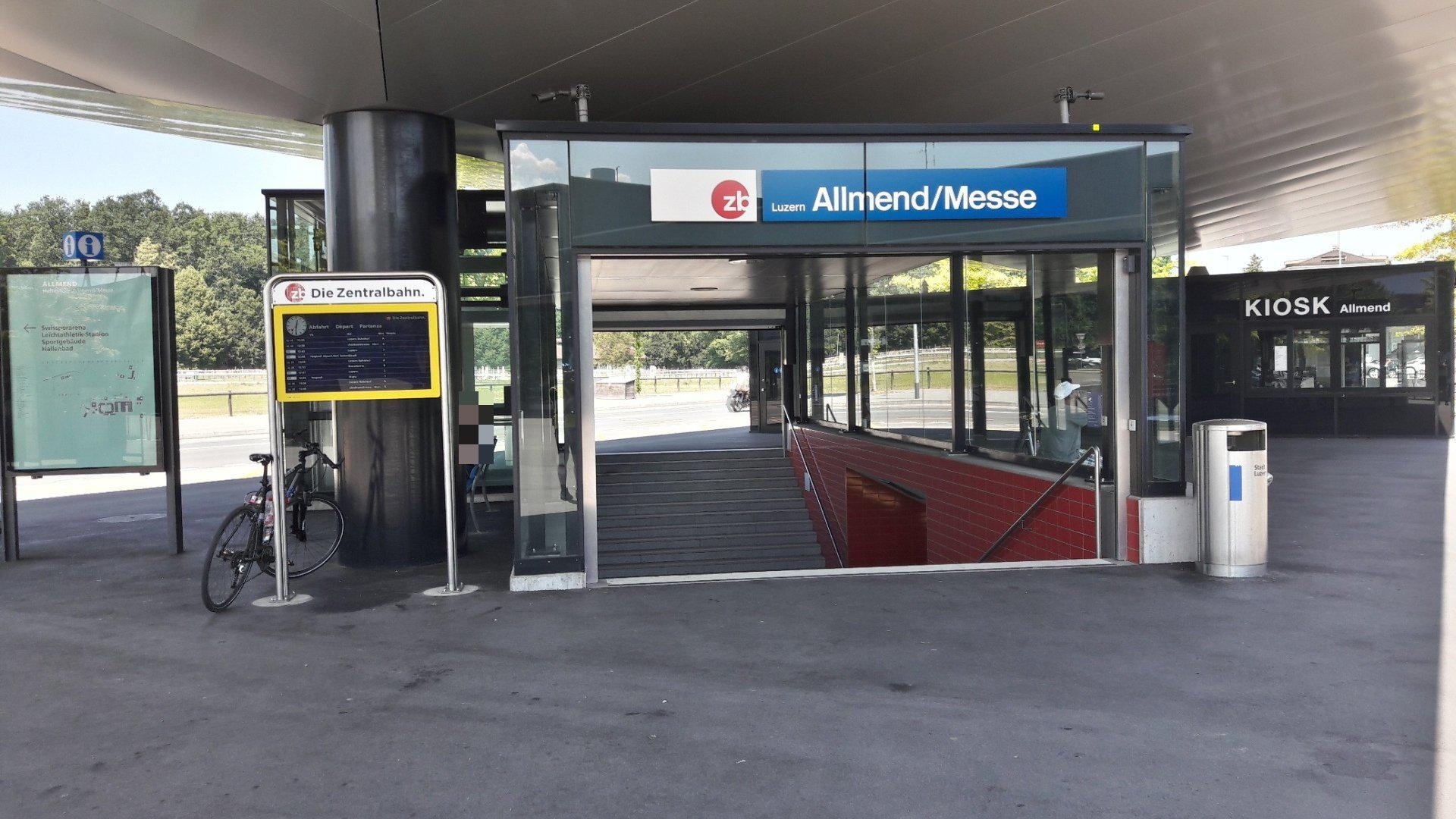
- The station entrance in 2018

General information
- Location: Lucerne; Switzerland
- Coordinates: 47°02′06″N 8°18′12″E
- Owner: Zentralbahn
- Line: Brünig line
- Train operators: Zentralbahn

History
- Opened: 9 December 2012

Services
Preceding station	Lucerne S-Bahn	Following station
Kriens Mattenhof towards Wolfenschiessen	S4	Lucerne Terminus
Kriens Mattenhof towards Giswil	S5	Lucerne Terminus
Kriens Mattenhof towards Horw	S41	Lucerne Terminus
Location

Luzern Allmend/Messe railway station (German: Bahnhof Luzern Allmend/Messe) is a railway station in the city of Lucerne, in the Swiss canton of Lucerne. It is located adjacent to the Swissporarena, in the south of the city. The station is on the Brünig line of the Zentralbahn railway company, and is used by trains of the Luzern–Stans–Engelberg line.

== History ==
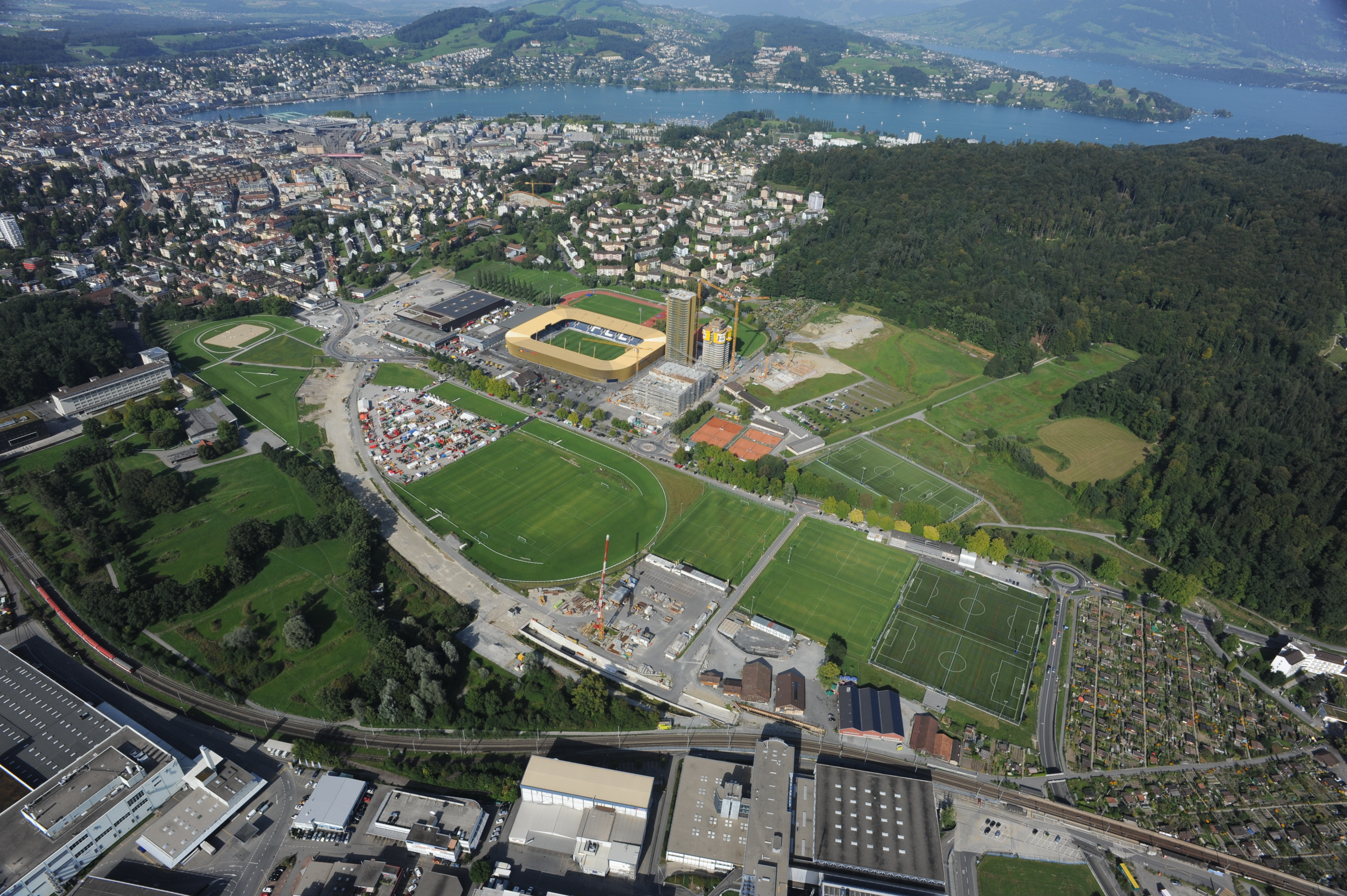
Aerial photograph clearly showing the route of the new tunnel under construction. The station is situated to the left of the stadium. A train can be seen on the, now abandoned, old alignment

The station opened in December 2012, and is situated in a tunnel linking Kriens Mattenhof station and the approaches to Lucerne station. The tunnel replaces a less direct surface alignment, allowing the abolition of several congested level crossings and the provision of double track. The new station gives access for an estimated 500,000 people per year, to the nearby sports, leisure and exhibition facilities.

== Services ==
As of the December 2021 timetable change, the following services stop at Luzern Allmend/Messe:

- Lucerne S-Bahn S4/S5: service every fifteen minutes between Lucerne and Hergiswil; from Hergiswil every half-hour to Giswil or Stans and every hour to Wolfenschiessen. The S41 provides additional weekday rush-hour service between Horw and Lucerne.

Luzern Allmend/Messe also receives cargo thru-traffic on track 2 serving industries near Horw. This cargo traffic is standard gauge, requiring the use of dual gauge track on one of the two mainline tracks until the serviced industries.

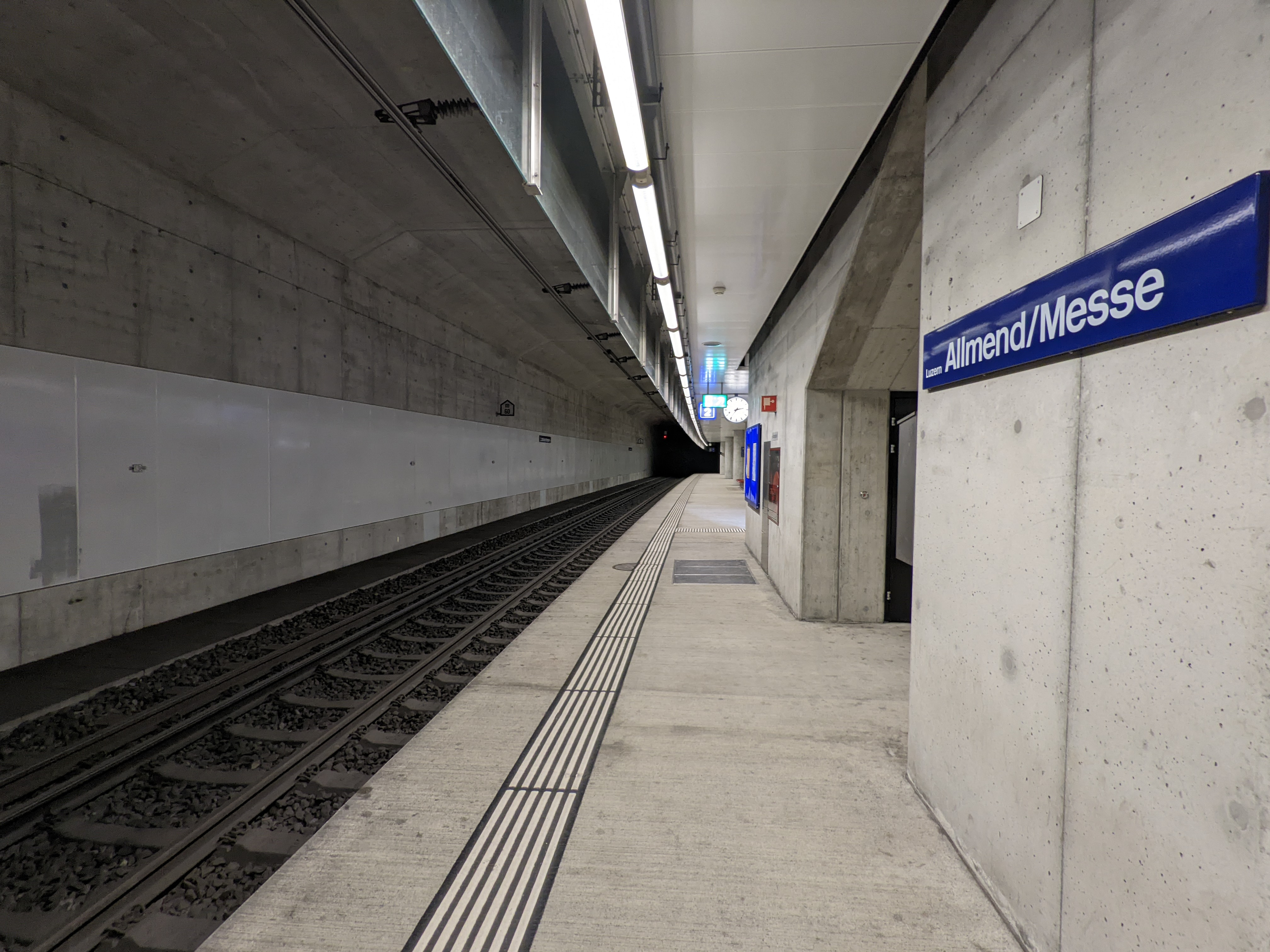
Image showing the dual gauge trackage that runs along Platform Two in the station.

== See also ==
- Rail transport in Switzerland
