= Stansstad railway station =

Railway station in Switzerland

Stansstad
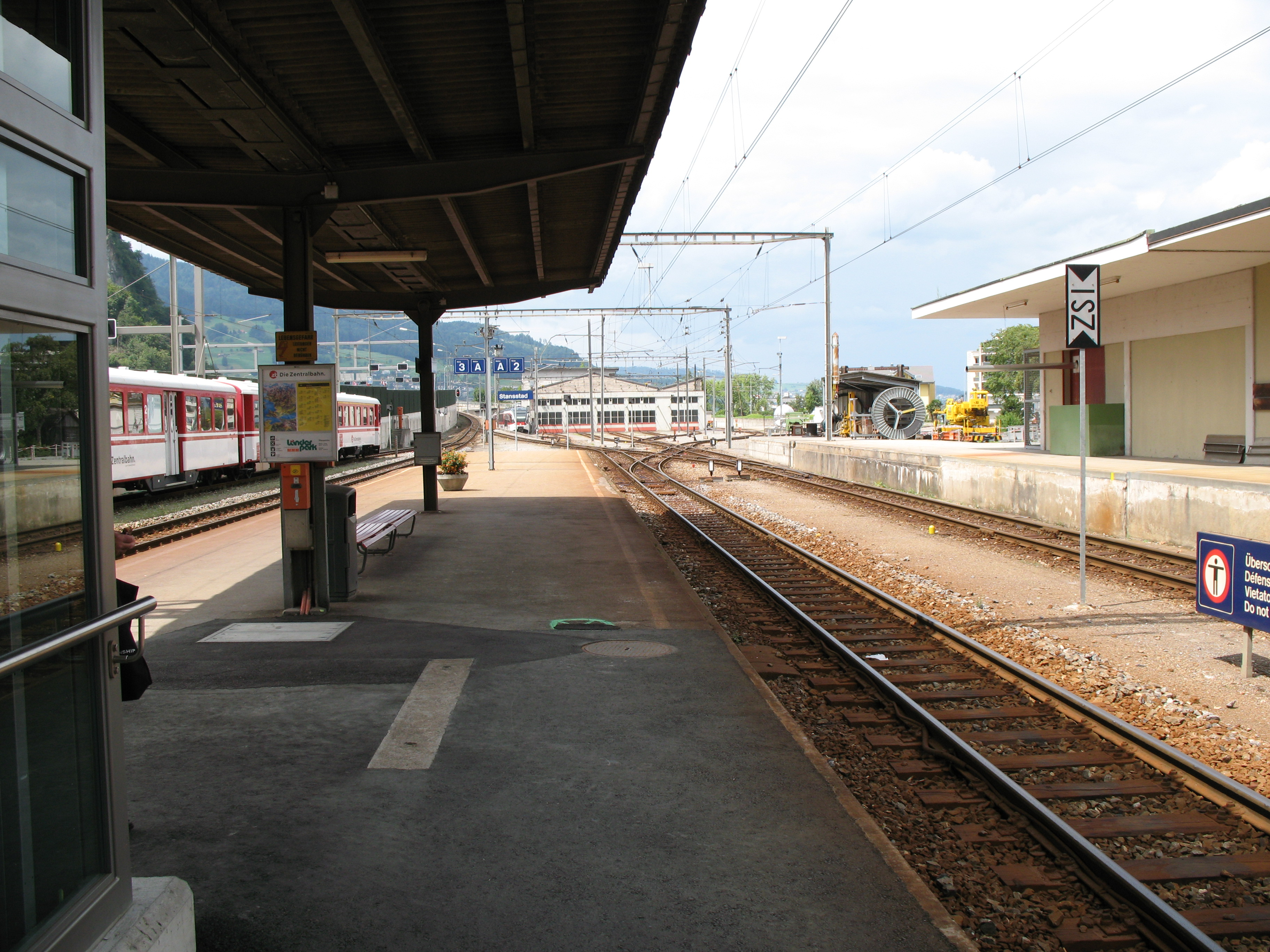
- The station platforms in 2007

General information
- Location: Bahnhofstrasse; Stansstad; Switzerland
- Coordinates: 46°58′35″N 8°20′11″E
- Elevation: 436 m (1,430 ft)
- Owner: Zentralbahn
- Line: Luzern–Stans–Engelberg line
- Train operators: Zentralbahn

Services
Preceding station	Lucerne S-Bahn	Following station
Stans towards Wolfenschiessen	S4	Hergiswil towards Lucerne
Stans Terminus	S44	Hergiswil towards Lucerne
Location
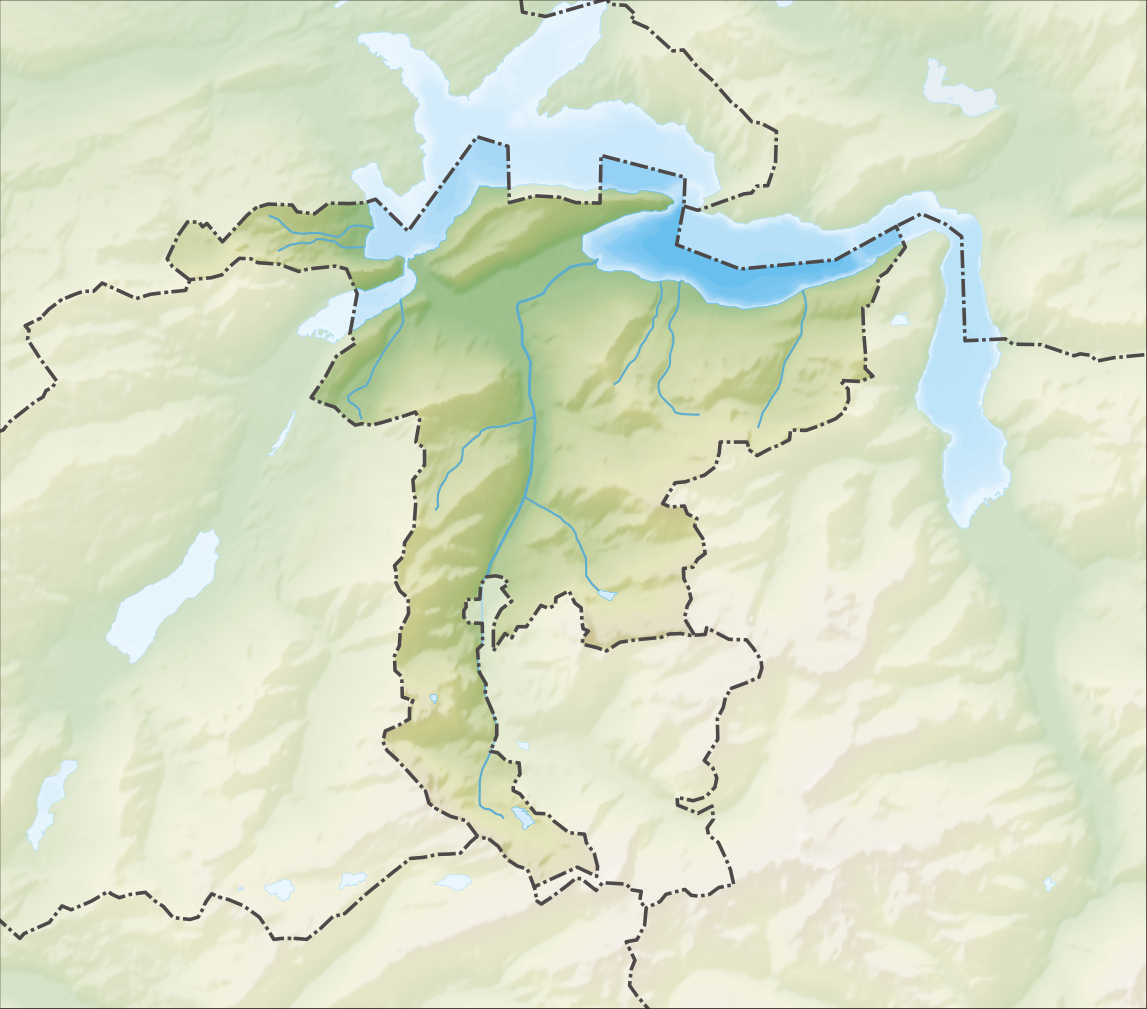
- Location within Switzerland Location within Canton of Nidwalden

Stansstad railway station is a Swiss railway station in the municipality of Stansstad in the canton of Nidwalden. It is on the Luzern–Stans–Engelberg line, owned by the Zentralbahn railway company, and is adjacent to the bridge that carries the line across the Alpnachersee arm of Lake Lucerne and into the Lopper II tunnel.

The current railway station is the second to exist in Stansstad, having been built as a through station on the section of line opened in 1964 to connect the then Stansstad–Engelberg line to the Brünig line at Hergiswil. The original Stansstad station was a terminus, located on the lake side some 500 m (1,600 ft) to the north of the current station. The original station building still exists, now devoid of rails but still used by lake shipping. The old and new routes converge on the Stans side of Stansstad, but little trace is left of the old route.

== Services ==
The following services stop at Stansstad:

- Lucerne S-Bahn:
  - S4: half-hourly service between Lucerne and Stans, with every other train continuing to Wolfenschiessen.
  - S44: rush-hour service between Lucerne and Stans.

The station is also served by post bus services, including services to Bürgenstock, Stans and Büren. The old station, albeit 500 m (1,600 ft) walk away, is served by the Lake Lucerne shipping services of the Schifffahrtsgesellschaft des Vierwaldstättersees (SGV), providing an alternative connection to Lucerne and other lakeside communities.

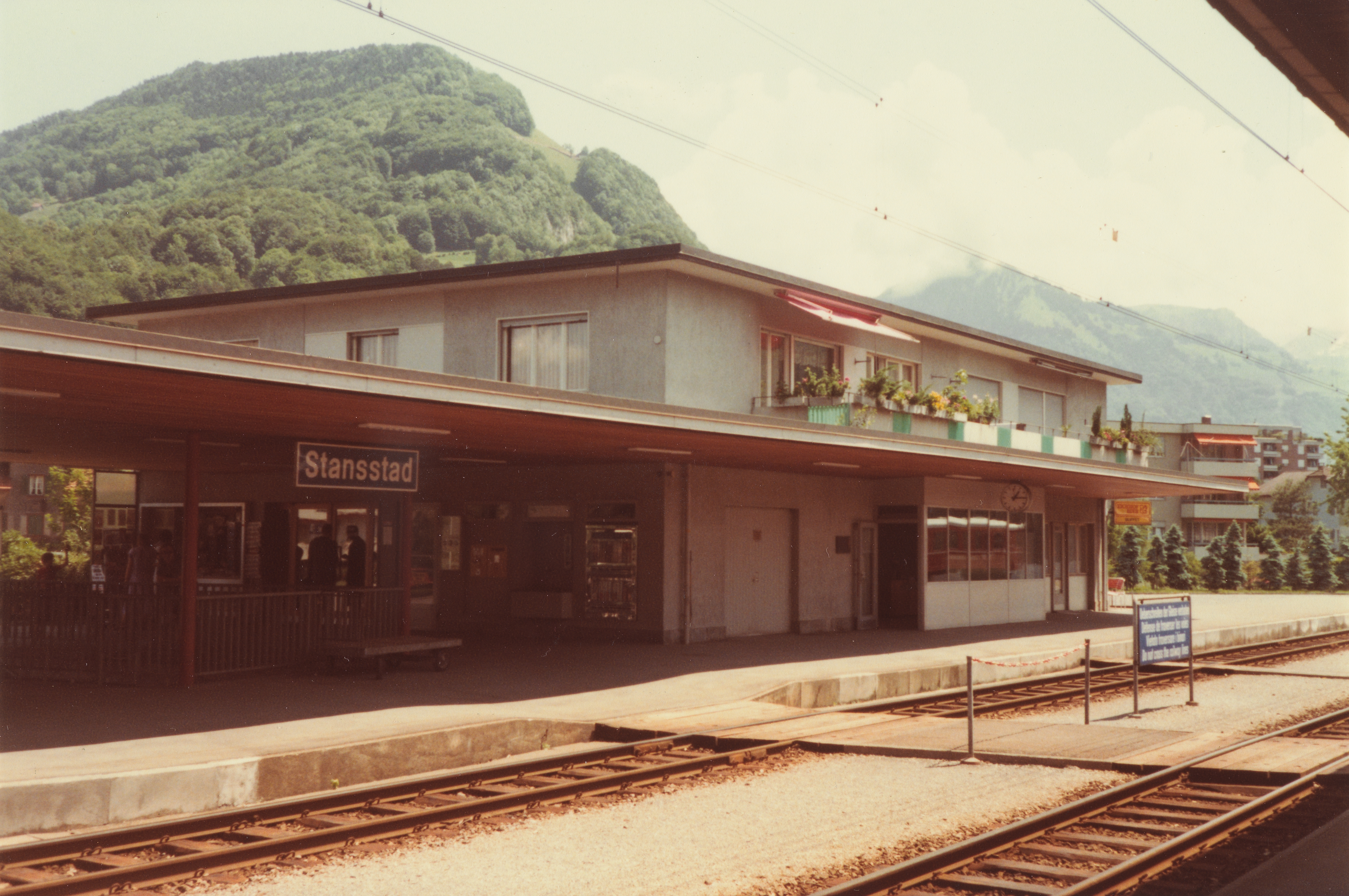
station building in 1981 with flat roof

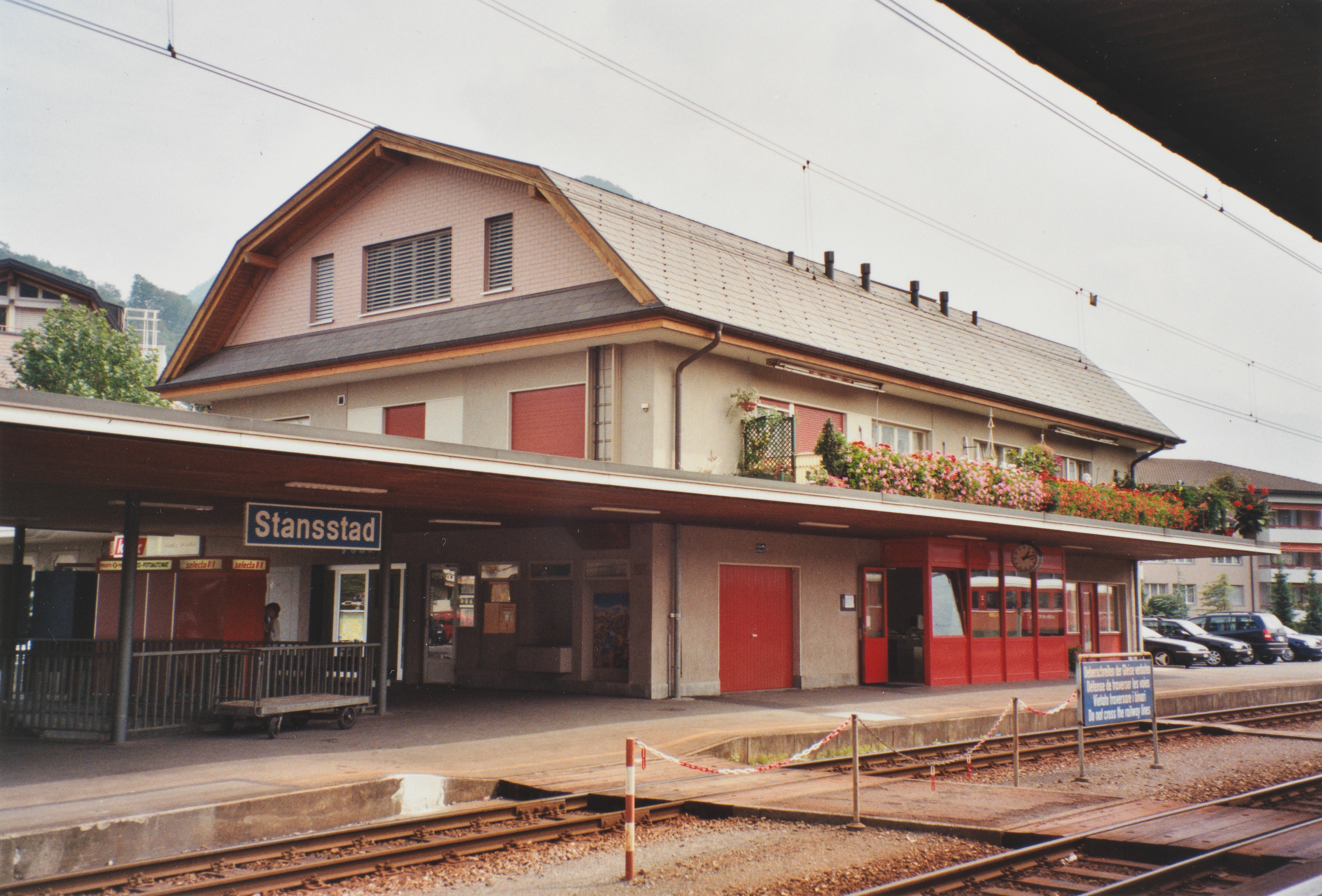
station building in 1999

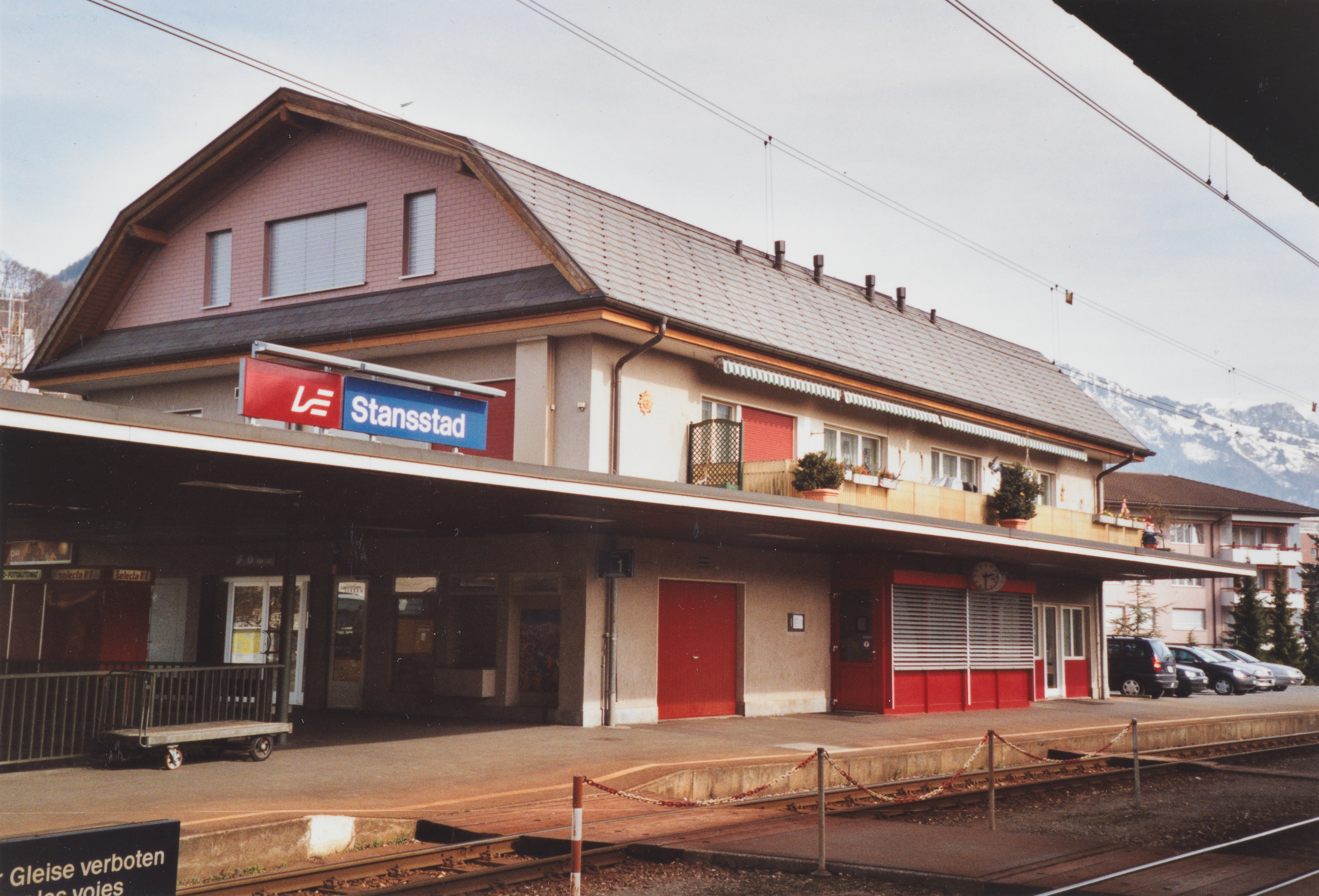
station building in 2004

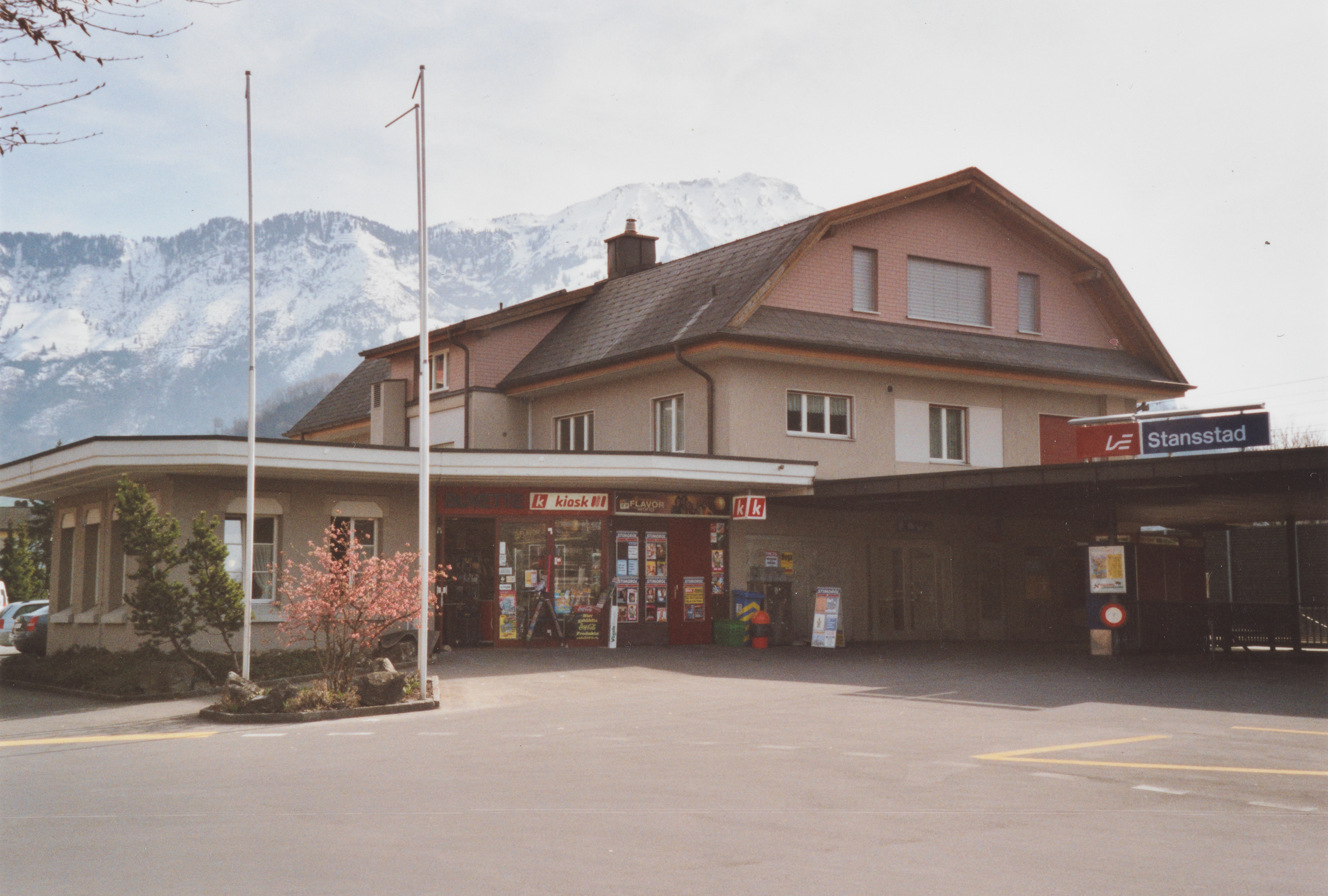
station building in 2004, Bahnhofstrasse side
