= Kriens Mattenhof railway station =

Railway station in Switzerland

Kriens Mattenhof
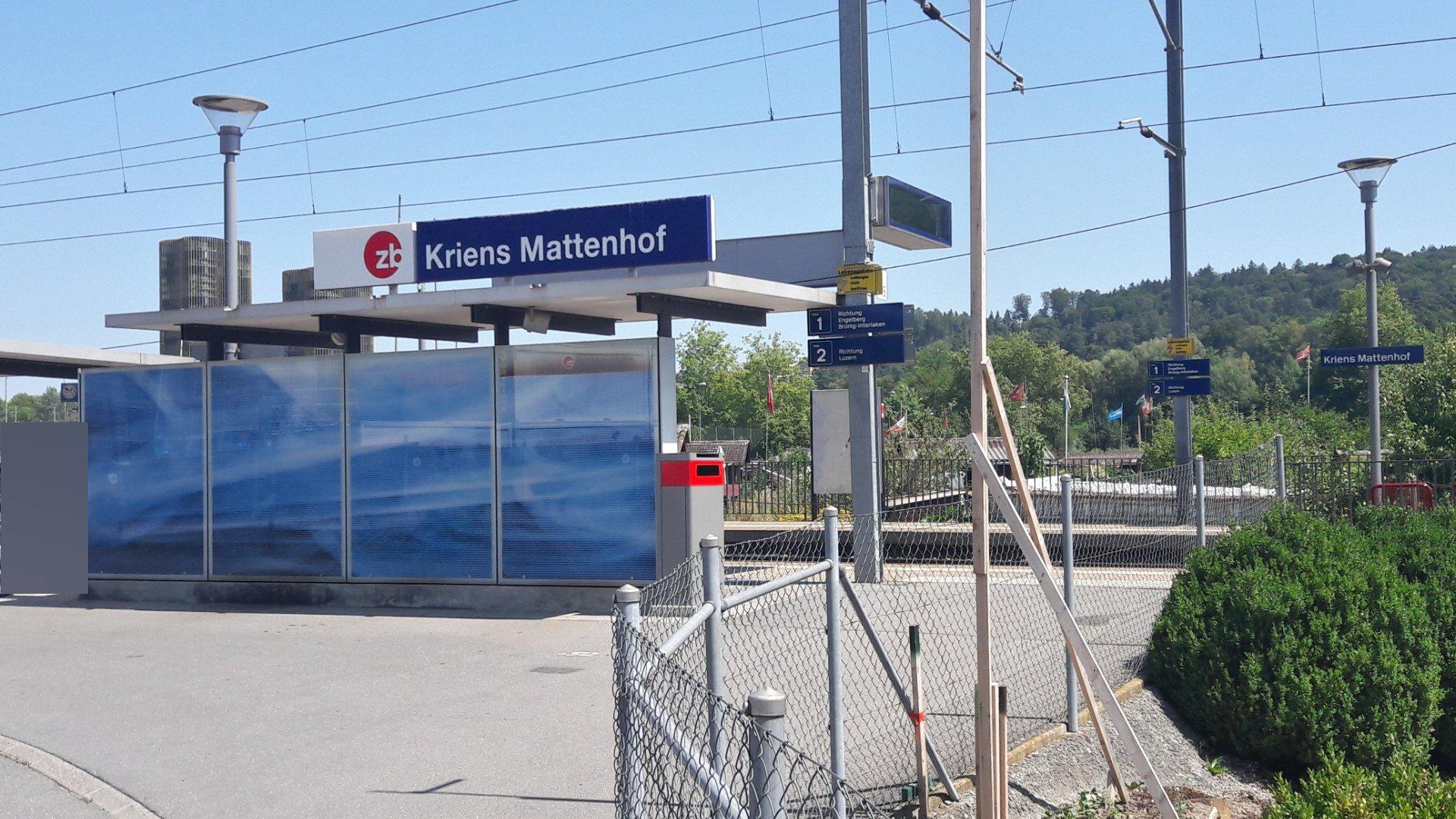
- The station platform in 2018

General information
- Location: Horwerstrasse; Kriens; Switzerland
- Coordinates: 47°01′36″N 8°18′08″E
- Owner: Zentralbahn
- Line: Brünig line
- Train operators: Zentralbahn

Services
Preceding station	Lucerne S-Bahn	Following station
Horw towards Wolfenschiessen	S4	Luzern Allmend/Messe towards Lucerne
Horw towards Giswil	S5	Luzern Allmend/Messe towards Lucerne
Horw Terminus	S41	Luzern Allmend/Messe towards Lucerne
Location

Kriens Mattenhof railway station is a Swiss railway station in the municipality of Kriens in the canton of Lucerne. It is on the Brünig line of the Zentralbahn railway company, which links Lucerne and Interlaken, and is also used by trains of the Luzern–Stans–Engelberg line.

Immediately to the north of Kriens Mattenhof station, the railway enters a tunnel as far as the approaches to Lucerne station, calling at the underground Lucerne Allmend/Messe station on the way. This tunnel opened in November 2012, replacing a less direct surface alignment.

== Services ==
As of the December 2021 timetable change, the following services stop at Kriens Mattenhof:

- Lucerne S-Bahn S4/S5: service every fifteen minutes between Lucerne and Hergiswil; from Hergiswil every half-hour to Giswil or Stans and every hour to Wolfenschiessen. The S41 provides additional weekday rush-hour service between Horw and Lucerne.
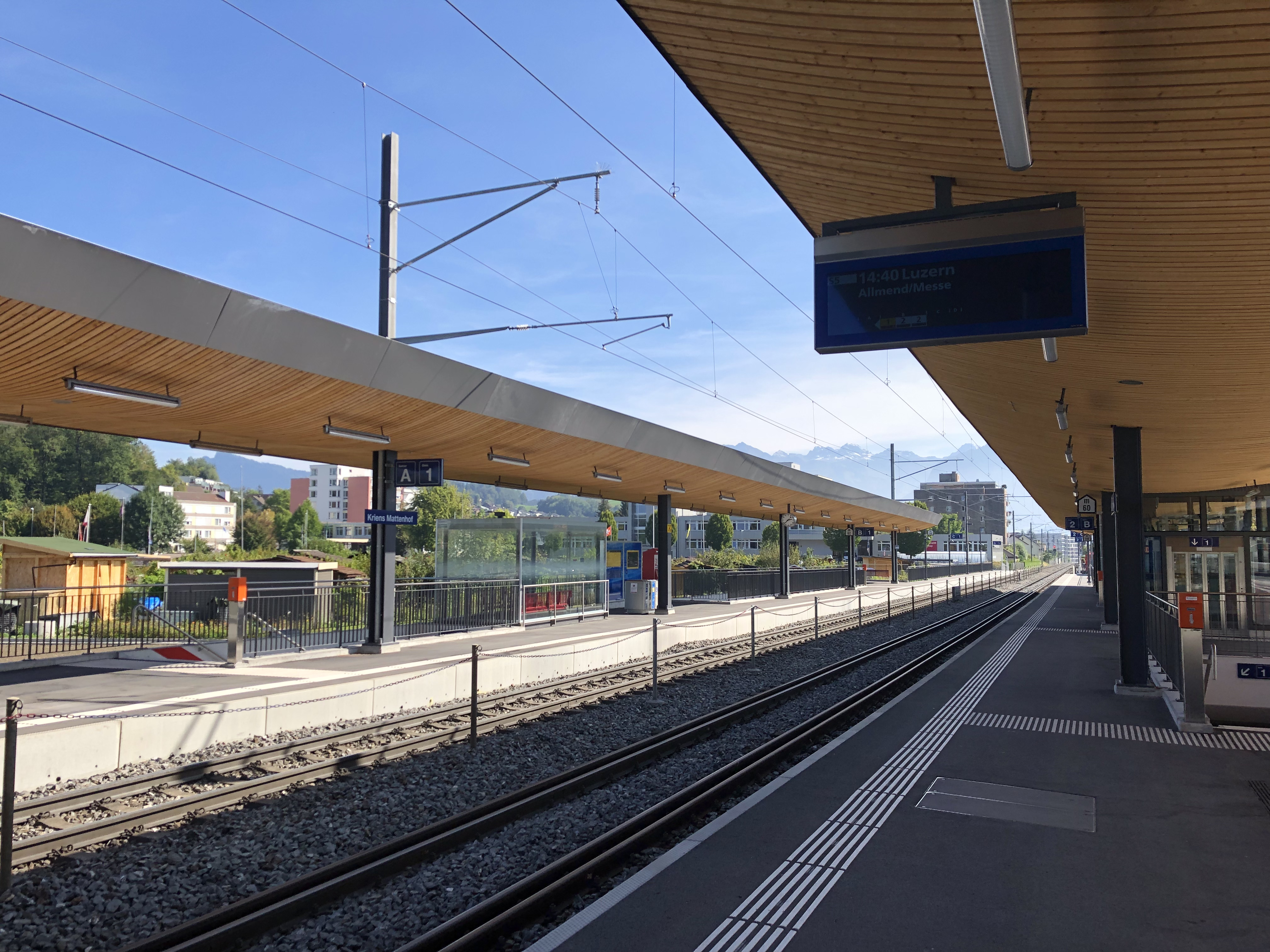
station in 2021

== See also ==
- Rail transport in Switzerland
