= Hergiswil =

- Municipality
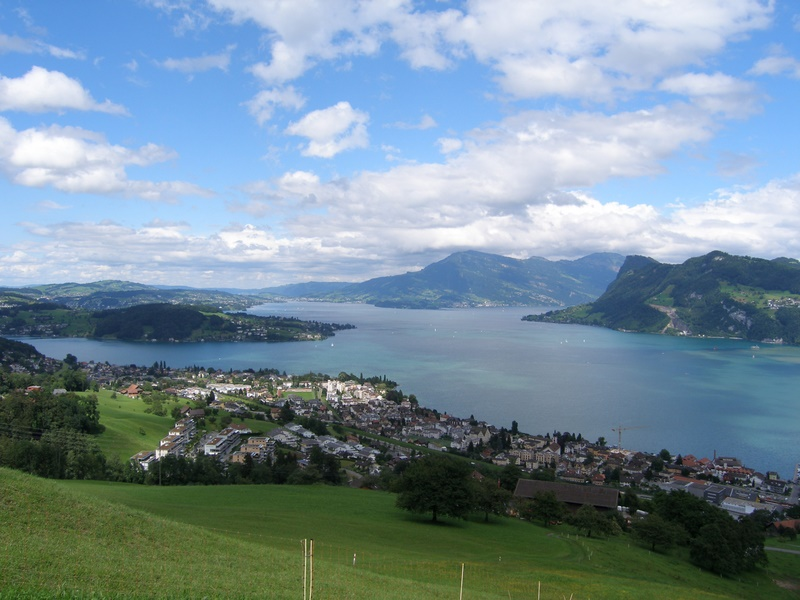

- Flag Coat of arms
- Location of Hergiswil
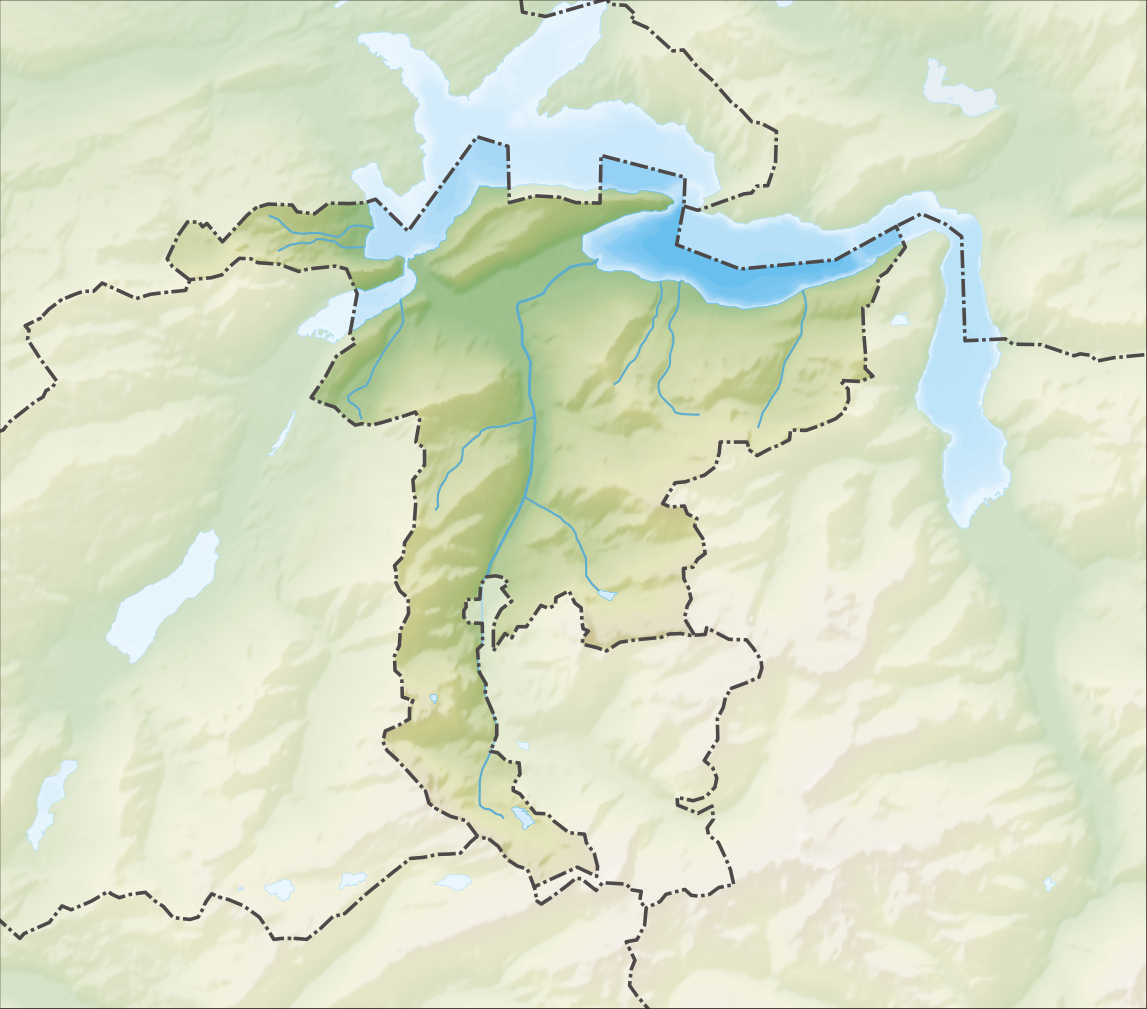
- Location within Switzerland Location within Canton of Nidwalden
- Coordinates: 46°58′N 8°18′E
- Country: Switzerland
- Canton: Nidwalden
- District: n.a.

Area
  - Total: 17.00 km^{2} (6.56 sq mi)
- Elevation: 449 m (1,473 ft)

Population (December 2020)
  - Total: 5,863
  - Density: 344.9/km^{2} (893.2/sq mi)
- Time zone: UTC+01:00 (CET)
  - Summer (DST): UTC+02:00 (CEST)
- Postal code: 6052
- SFOS number: 1507
- ISO 3166 code: CH-NW
- Surrounded by: Alpnach (OW), Horw (LU), Kriens (LU), Schwarzenberg (LU), Stansstad
- Website: www.hergiswil.ch

Hergiswil is a municipality in the canton of Nidwalden in Switzerland.

== History ==
Hergiswil is first mentioned around 1303-09 as ze Hergenswile.

== Geography ==
Aerial view (1964)

Hergiswil has an area, as of 2006, of 14.2 square kilometers (5.5 sq mi). Of this area, 29.3% is used for agricultural purposes, while 44.4% is forested. Of the rest of the land, 9.7% is settled (buildings or roads) and the remainder (16.6%) is non-productive (rivers, glaciers or mountains).

The municipality is located between the foot of Mount Pilatus and Lake Lucerne.

== Demographics ==
Hergiswil has a population (as of 31 December 2020) of 5,863. As of 2007, 14.5% of the population was made up of foreign nationals. Over the last 10 years the population has grown at a rate of 11.5%. Most of the population (as of 2000) speaks German (91.0%), with Italian being second most common ( 2.0%) and French being third ( 1.1%). As of 2008 the gender distribution of the population was 52.2% male and 47.8% female.

As of 2000 there are 2,216 households, of which 1,627 households (or about 73.4%) contain only one or two individuals. 91 or about 4.1% are large households, with at least five members.

In the 2007 federal election the most popular party was the FDP which received 89.1% of the vote. Most of the rest of the votes went to local small right-wing parties (9.3%).

In Hergiswil about 77.7% of the population (between age 25-64) have completed either non-mandatory upper secondary education or additional higher education (either university or a Fachhochschule).

Hergiswil has an unemployment rate of 1.24%. As of 2005, there were 89 people employed in the primary economic sector and about 35 businesses involved in this sector. 666 people are employed in the secondary sector and there are 72 businesses in this sector. 2,091 people are employed in the tertiary sector, with 382 businesses in this sector.

The historical population is given in the following table:

year	population
1769	460
1850	804
1900	1,080
1950	2,904
1970	4,364
1990	4,625
2000	4,962
2005	5,396

== Transport ==
Hergiswil is served by Hergiswil station and Hergiswil Matt station on the Brünig railway line, and the linked Luzern–Stans–Engelberg line. The Lucerne S-Bahn services S4 and S5 combine to provide four trains per hour at each station. Hergiswil station is also served by hourly InterRegio trains between Lucerne and Interlaken, and between Lucerne and Engelberg.

== Sights ==
The main sights of Hergiswil are: an old clergy house, the church, the chapel Maria zum guten Rat, old mansion Thumigerhaus, and a glazier's workshop with museum. The workshop was established in 1817, burning down on one occasion, but is still working.
