= Hergiswil Matt railway station =

Station in Nidwalden, Switzerland

Hergiswil Matt
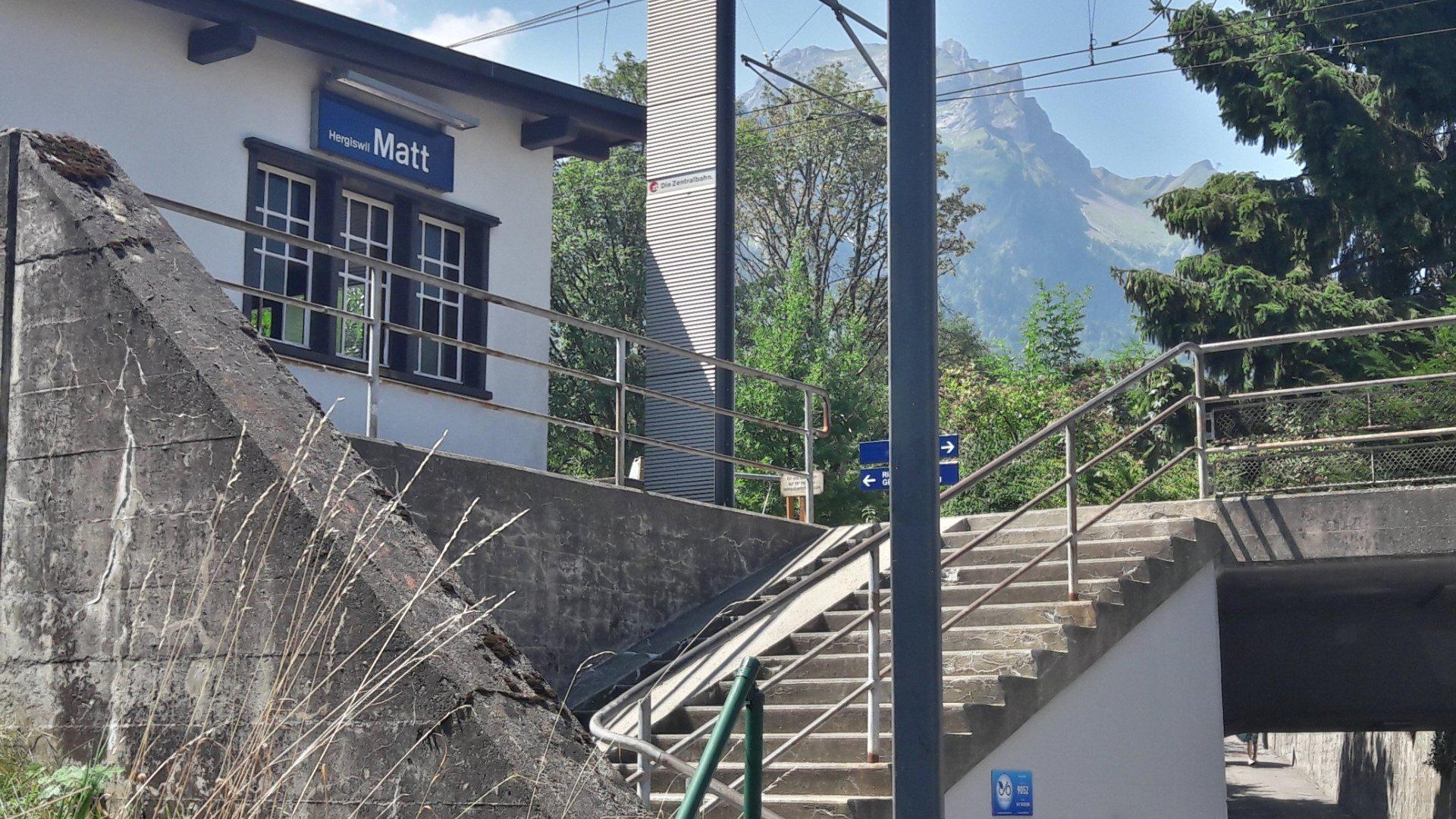
- The station in 2018

General information
- Location: Seestrasse; Hergiswil; Switzerland
- Coordinates: 46°59′39″N 8°18′45″E
- Owner: Zentralbahn
- Line: Brünig line
- Train operators: Zentralbahn

Services
Preceding station	Lucerne S-Bahn	Following station
Hergiswil towards Wolfenschiessen	S4	Horw towards Lucerne
Hergiswil towards Giswil	S5	Horw towards Lucerne
Location
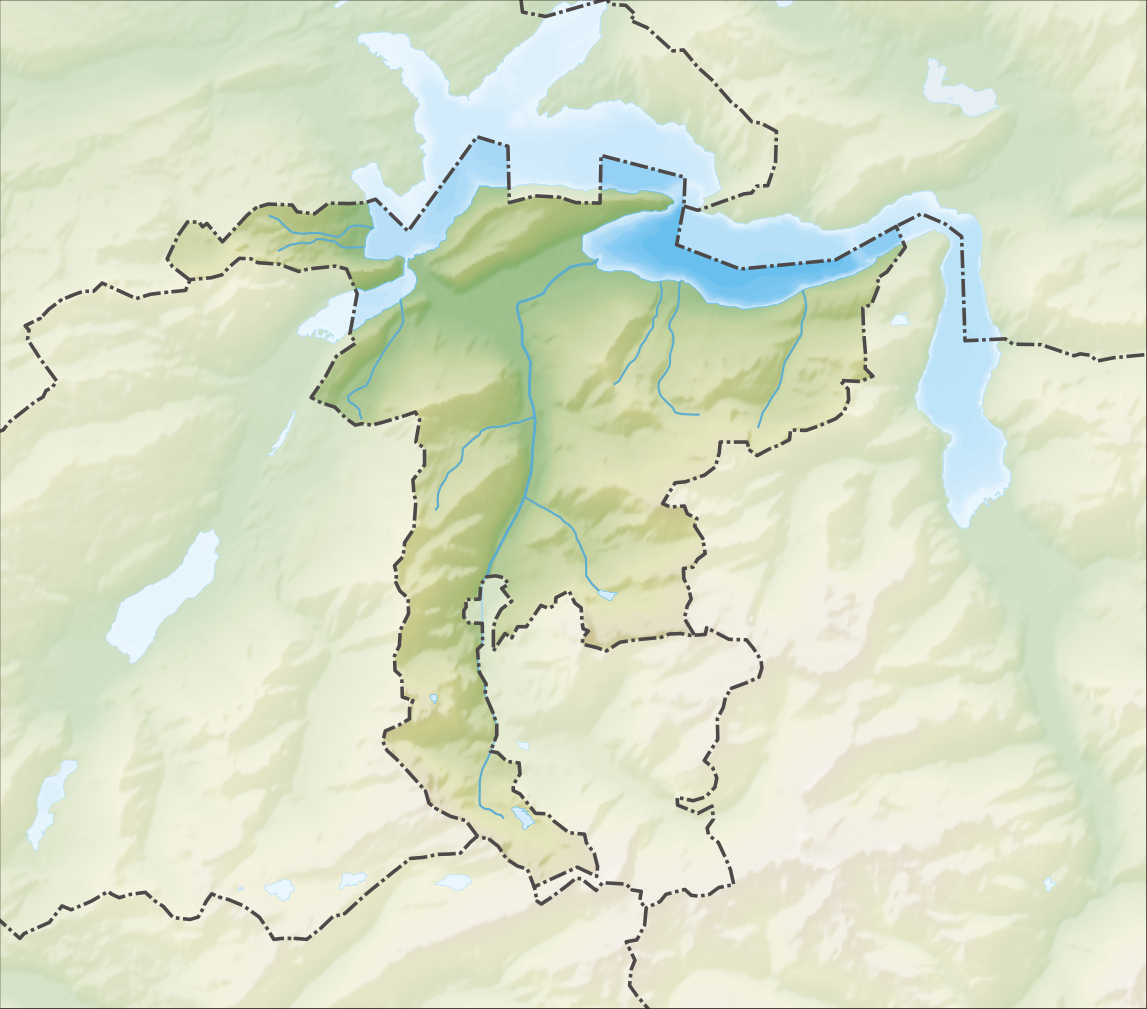
- Location within Switzerland Location within Canton of Nidwalden

Hergiswil Matt railway station is a Swiss railway station in the municipality of Hergiswil in the canton of Nidwalden. It is on the Brünig line of the Zentralbahn railway company, which links Lucerne and Interlaken, and is also used by trains of the Luzern–Stans–Engelberg line.

Hergiswil Matt station is one of two stations to serve Hergiswil, the other being Hergiswil, which is on the Brünig line some 1.5 kilometres (0.93 mi) to the south.

== Services ==
The following services stop at Hergiswil Matt:

- Lucerne S-Bahn S4/S5: service every fifteen minutes between Lucerne and Hergiswil; from Hergiswil every half-hour to Giswil or Stans and every hour to Wolfenschiessen.

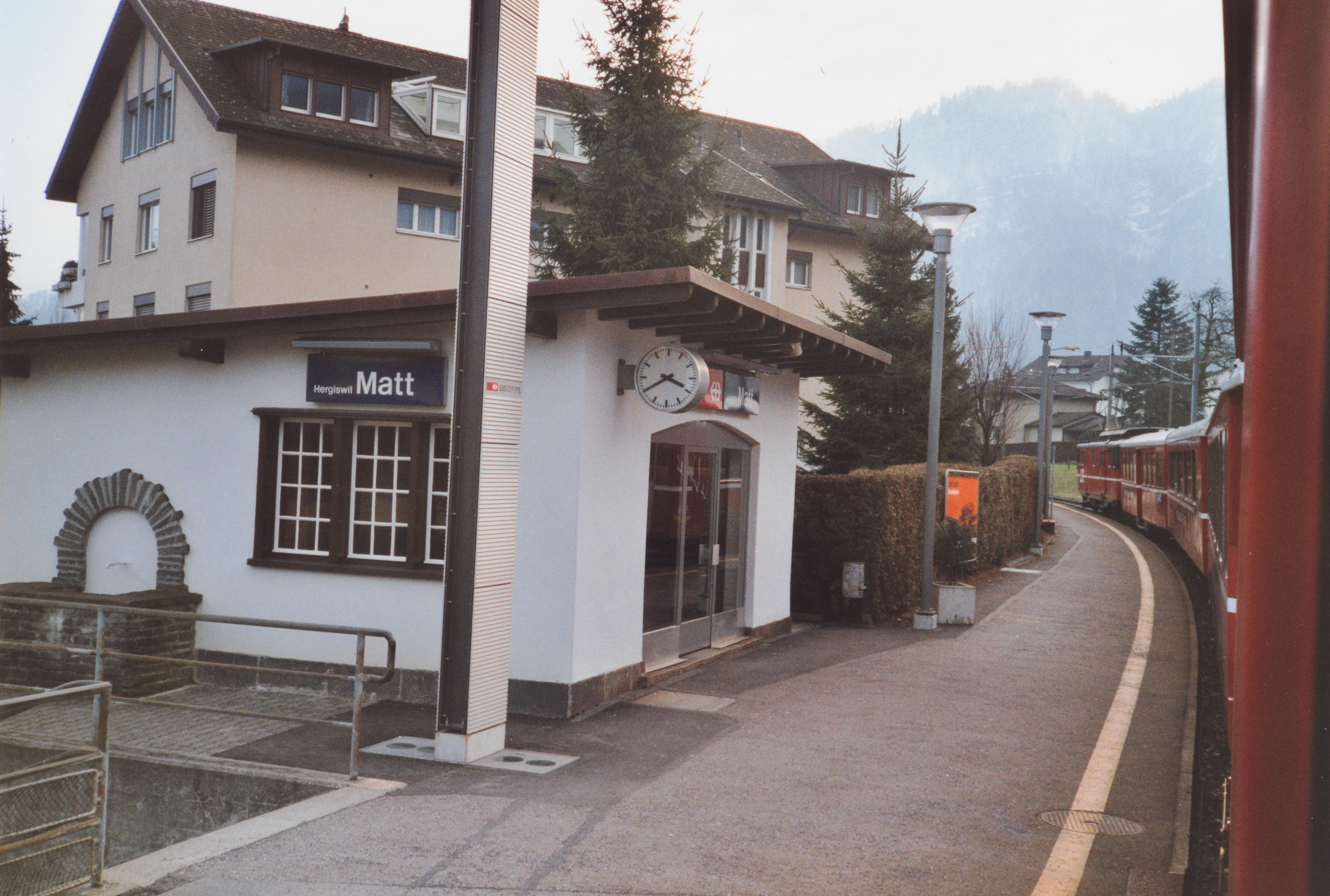
station, 2004

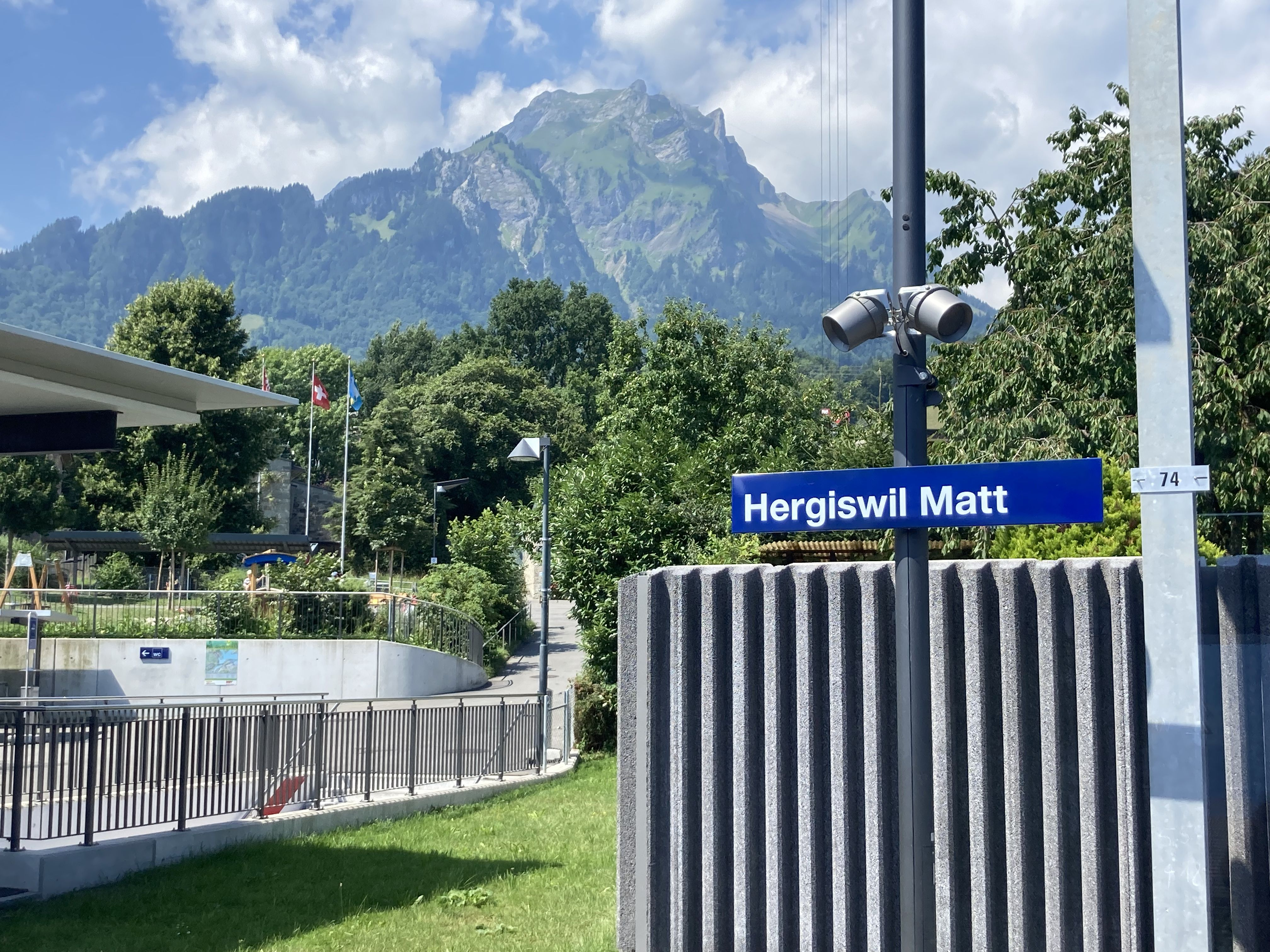
Mount Pilatus in the distance at the station, 2022
