= Horw railway station =

Railway station in Switzerland

Horw
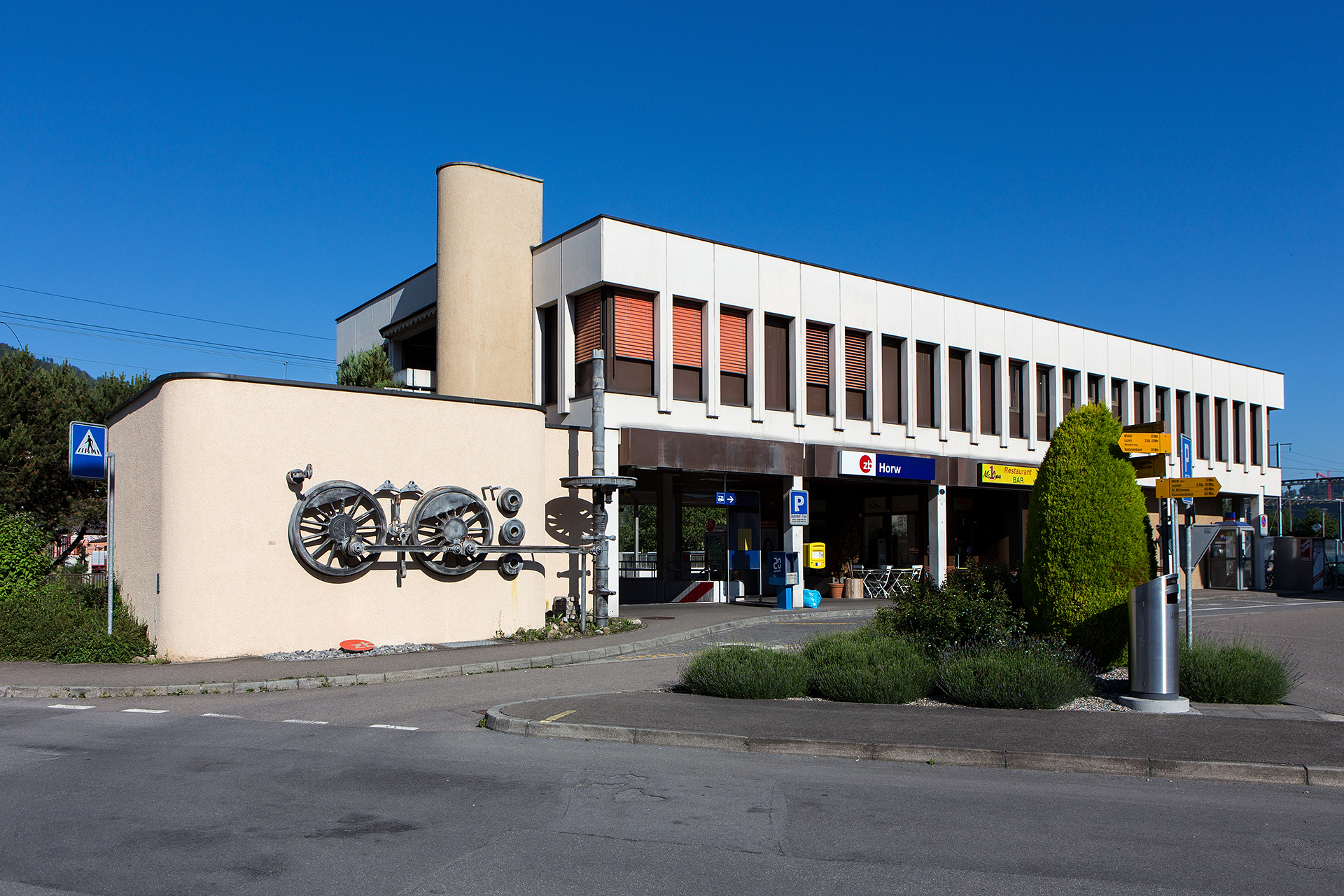
- The station building in 2017, demolished 2020

General information
- Location: Bahnhofstrasse; Horw; Switzerland
- Coordinates: 47°01′03″N 8°18′25″E
- Elevation: 442 m (1,450 ft)
- Owner: Zentralbahn
- Line: Brünig line
- Train operators: Zentralbahn

Services
Preceding station	Lucerne S-Bahn	Following station
Hergiswil Matt towards Wolfenschiessen	S4	Kriens Mattenhof towards Lucerne
Hergiswil Matt towards Giswil	S5	Kriens Mattenhof towards Lucerne
Terminus	S41	Kriens Mattenhof towards Lucerne
Location
- Location within Switzerland Location within Canton of Lucerne

Horw railway station is a Swiss railway station in the municipality of Horw in the canton of Lucerne. It is on the Brünig line of the Zentralbahn railway company, which links Lucerne and Interlaken, and is also used by trains of the Luzern–Stans–Engelberg line.

== Services ==
As of the December 2021 timetable change, the following services stop at Horw:

- Lucerne S-Bahn S4 / S5: service every fifteen minutes between Lucerne and Hergiswil; from Hergiswil every half-hour to Giswil or Stans and every hour to Wolfenschiessen or Dallenwil. The S41 provides additional weekday rush-hour service to Lucerne.
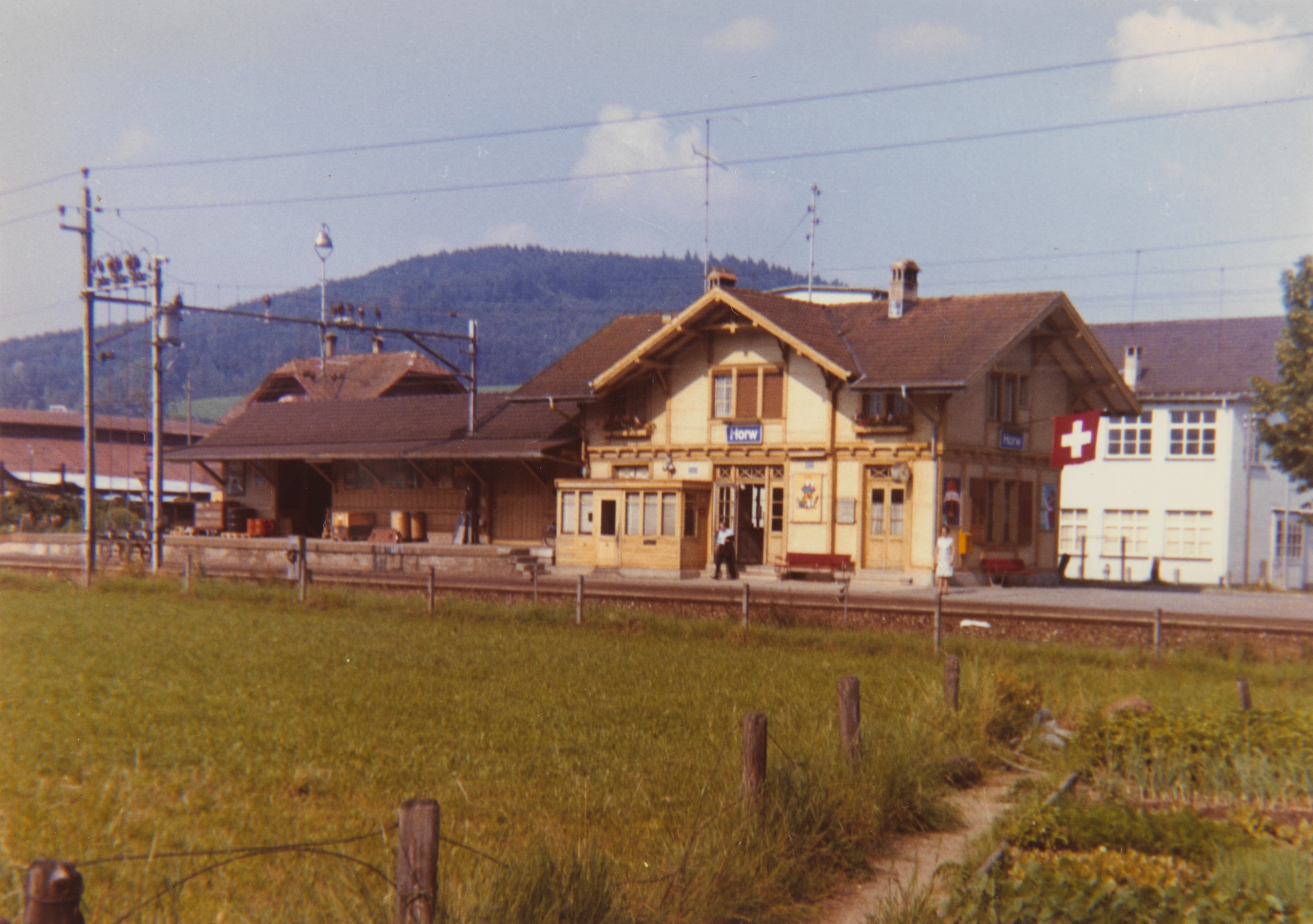
old station building, ca. 1980
