= Glasi Hergiswil =

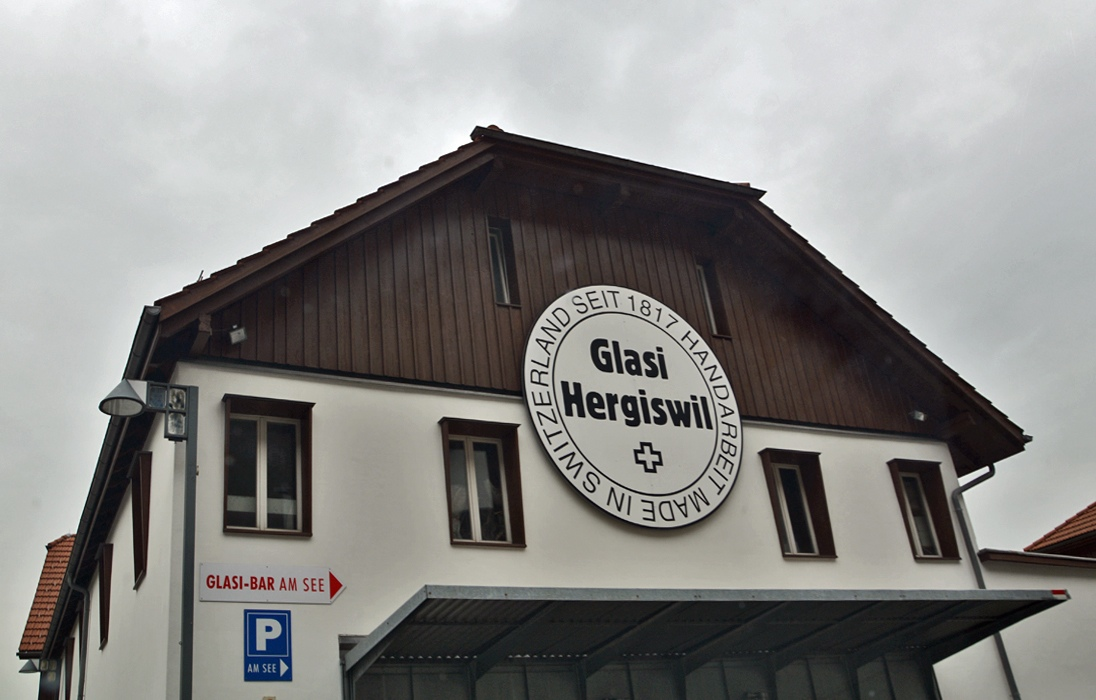
Glasi Hergiswil

The Glasi Hergiswil is a Swiss factory that manufactures glass in Nidwalden, Switzerland. It was founded by the brothers Siegwart in 1817. The Glasi was threatened to be closed because of old machines and technology. Due to the efforts of the community it remained open. It also offers visitors the opportunity to observe workers as they produce the glass. The Glasi has a museum and is home to the first glass labyrinth in Switzerland.
