= Horw =

- Municipality
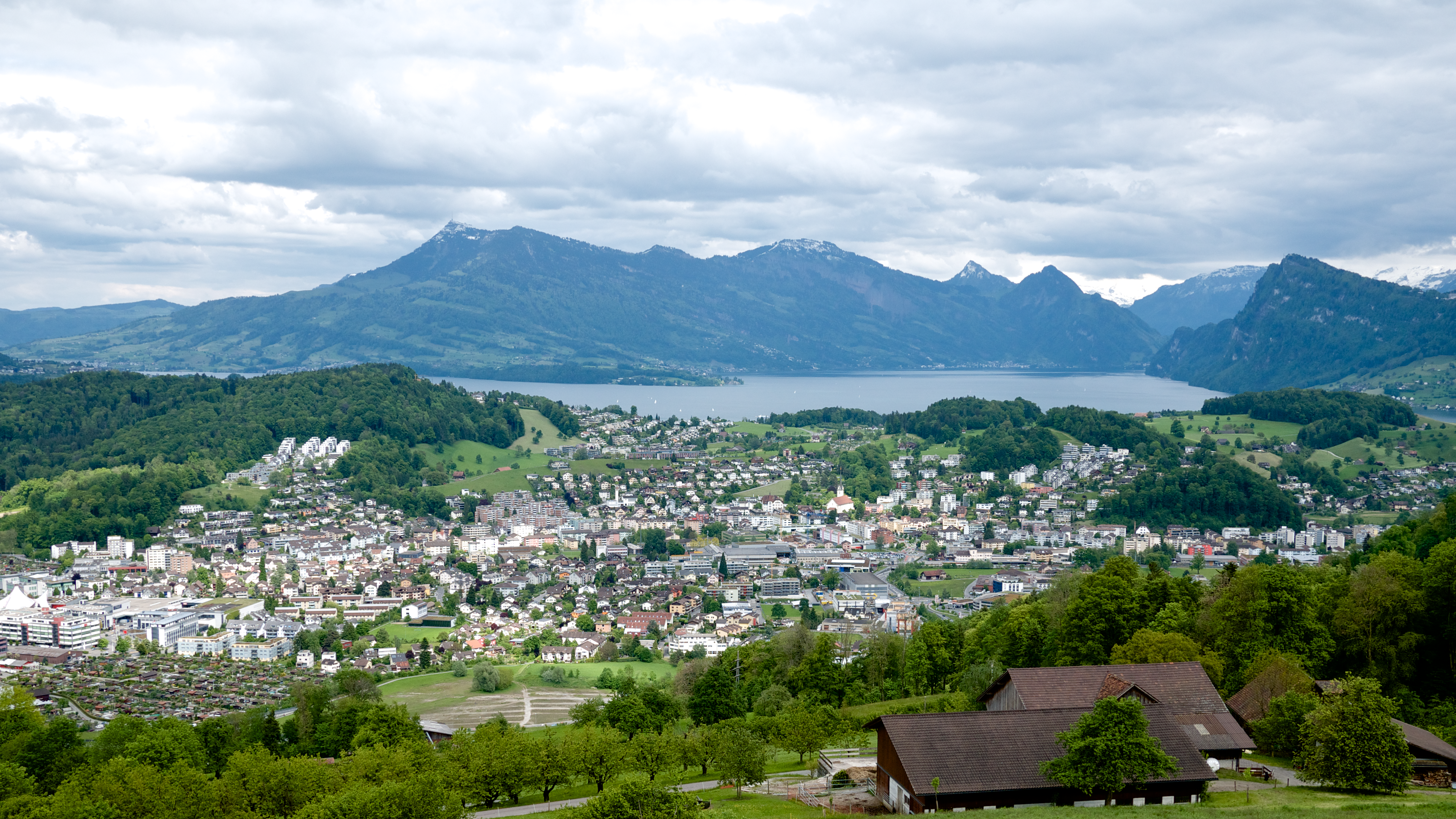

- Flag Coat of arms
- Location of Horw
- Location within Switzerland Location within Canton of Lucerne
- Coordinates: 47°1′N 8°19′E
- Country: Switzerland
- Canton: Lucerne
- District: Lucerne

Government
  - Executive: Gemeinderat with 5 members
  - Mayor: Gemeindepräsident; Gaudenz Zemp (as of 2020)
  - Parliament: Einwohnerrat with 30 members

Area
  - Total: 20.43 km^{2} (7.89 sq mi)
- Elevation: 441 m (1,447 ft)

Population (December 2020)
  - Total: 14,211
  - Density: 695.6/km^{2} (1,802/sq mi)
- Time zone: UTC+01:00 (CET)
  - Summer (DST): UTC+02:00 (CEST)
- Postal codes: 6005 St. Niklausen; 6047 Kastanienbaum; 6048 Horw
- SFOS number: 1058
- ISO 3166 code: CH-LU
- Surrounded by: Hergiswil (NW), Kriens, Lucerne (Luzern), Meggen, Stansstad (NW)
- Twin towns: Bratsch (Switzerland)
- Website: www.horw.ch

Horw (German pronunciation: [hɔʁv]; Swiss German: Horb) is a municipality in the district of Lucerne in the canton of Lucerne in Switzerland.

== History ==
Horw is first mentioned in 1231 as Horwe.

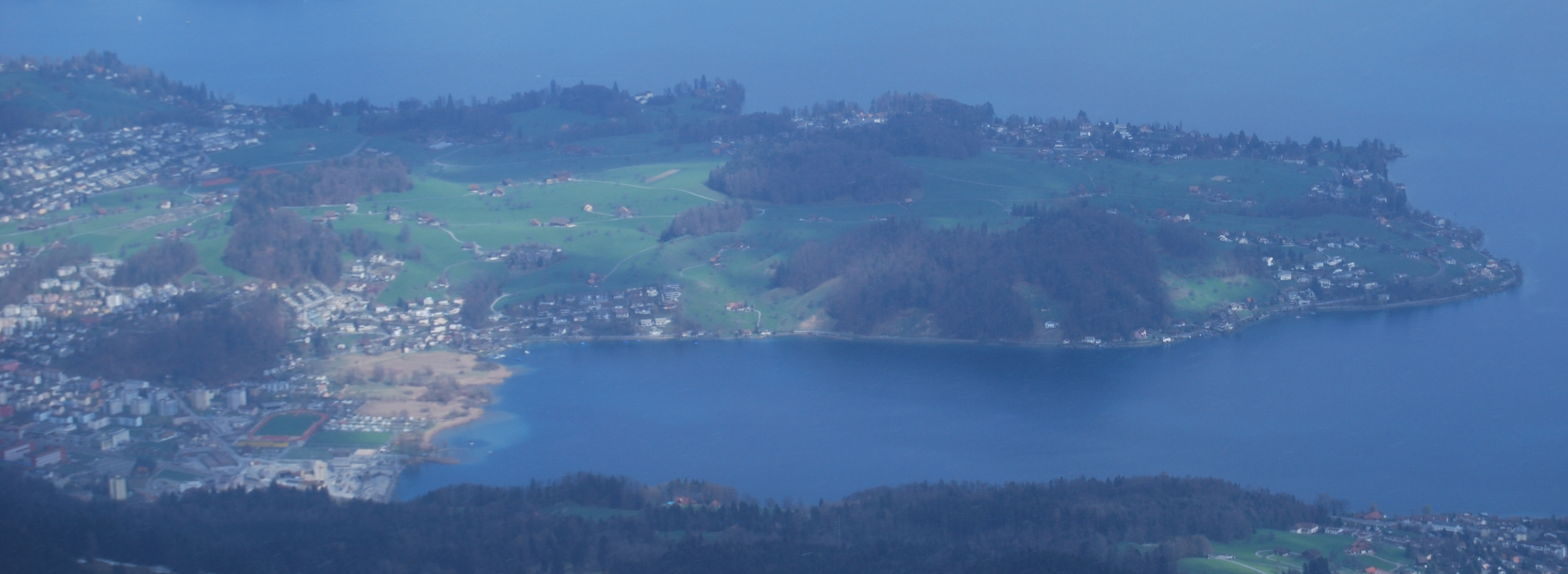
Horw

== Geography ==
Aerial view (1964)

Horw has an area of 12.8 km^{2} (4.9 sq mi). Of this area, 32.6% is used for agricultural purposes, while 42.5% is forested. Of the rest of the land, 24.2% is settled (buildings or roads) and the remainder (0.7%) is non-productive (rivers, glaciers or mountains). In the 1997 land survey, 42.42% of the total land area was forested. Of the agricultural land, 30.54% is used for farming or pastures, while 1.94% is used for orchards or vine crops. Of the settled areas, 14.61% is covered with buildings, 1.01% is industrial, 1.09% is classed as special developments, 1.79% is parks or greenbelts and 5.59% is transportation infrastructure. Of the unproductive areas, 0.39% is unproductive standing water (ponds or lakes), 0.08% is unproductive flowing water (rivers) and 0.54% is other unproductive land.

The municipality is located on the outskirts of Lucerne on the Horwer peninsula. It covers the base of Mt. Pilatus and the, until the 20th century, swampy valley below the mountain.

== Demographics ==
Horw has a population (as of 31 December 2020) of 14,211. As of 2007, 16.2% of the population was made up of foreign nationals. Over the last 10 years the population has grown at a rate of 8.8%. Most of the population (as of 2000) speaks German (86.5%), with Italian being second most common (2.3%) and Serbo-Croatian being third (2.0%).

In the 2007 election the most popular party was the SVP which received 25.2% of the vote. The next three most popular parties were the CVP (24.5%), the FDP (23.2%) and the SPS (13.4%).

The age distribution in Horw is as follows: 2,583 people or 19.9% of the population is 0–19 years old. 3,224 people or 24.8% are 20–39 years old, and 4,584 people or 35.3% are 40–64 years old. The senior population distribution is 1,990 people or 15.3% are 65–79 years old, 513 or 4% are 80–89 years old and 89 people or 0.7% of the population are 90+ years old.

The entire Swiss population is generally well educated. In Horw, about 74.2% of the population (between age 25 and 64) have completed either non-mandatory upper secondary education or additional higher education (either university or a Fachhochschule).

As of 2000 there are 5,426 households, of which 1,951 households (or about 36.0%) contain only a single individual. 282 or about 5.2% are large households, with at least five members. As of 2000 there were 1,771 inhabited buildings in the municipality, of which 1,537 were built only as housing, and 234 were mixed use buildings. There were 913 single family homes, 209 double family homes, and 415 multi-family homes in the municipality. Most homes were either two (692) or three (508) story structures. There were only 82 single story buildings and 255 four or more story buildings.

Horw has an unemployment rate of 2.15%. As of 2005, there were 235 people employed in the primary economic sector and about 45 businesses involved in this sector. 736 people are employed in the secondary sector and there are 120 businesses in this sector. 3423 people are employed in the tertiary sector, with 344 businesses in this sector. As of 2000 50.9% of the population of the municipality were employed in some capacity. At the same time, females made up 44.6% of the workforce.

In the 2000 census the religious membership of Horw was as follows: 8,153 (64.5%) were Roman Catholic, and 1,905 (15.1%) were Protestant, while an additional 247 (1.95%) were of some other Christian faith. Three individuals (0.02% of the population) were Jewish. 472 individuals (3.73% of the population) were Muslim. Of the rest, there were 135 (1.07%) individuals who belonged to another religion, 1,091 (8.63%) who did not belong to any organized religion, and 642 (5.08%) who did not answer the question.

The historical population is given in the following table:

year	population
around 1352	54 households
1583	c. 300
around 1695	c. 630
1798	836
1850	1,254
1900	1,747
1950	4,621
1970	10,632
2000	12,648

== Education ==
Horw has four primary level school centers (Hofmatt, Kastanienbaum, Allmend and Spitz) and one lower secondary level school center.

Horw is home to the Hochschule Luzern - Technik & Architektur. It is one of the five departments of the Lucerne University of Applied Sciences and Arts and offers degree programs in architecture, civil engineering, electrical engineering, building services engineering, computer science, interior design, mechanical engineering and also industrial engineering/innovation. The school is very interdisciplinary and practically oriented, so most of the students have previously completed a vocational apprenticeship and a vocational baccalaureate.

The building services engineering department is unique in Switzerland. It is divided into three fields of study: Heating-Ventilation-Air Conditioning (HVAC), Heating-Sanitary (HS) and Building Electrical Engineering (EE). Every year, about 25 engineers from all over the country graduate from this program. Their professional future lies mainly in the planning and implementation of diverse building technology in the construction industry.

== Transport ==
Horw is served by Horw station on the Brünig railway line, and the linked Luzern–Stans–Engelberg line. The Lucerne S-Bahn services S4, S5 and (in peak times) S41 combine to provide at least four trains per hour at the station. The buses (lines 20, 21, 14 and 16) from VBL Verkehrsbetriebe Luzern connect Horw frequently to Lucerne and Kriens.

== Notable people ==
- Ronny Hodel (born 1982 in Horw), a Swiss footballer who plays as a defender, about 200 club caps.
