= Hergiswil railway station =

Station in Nidwalden, Switzerland

Hergiswil
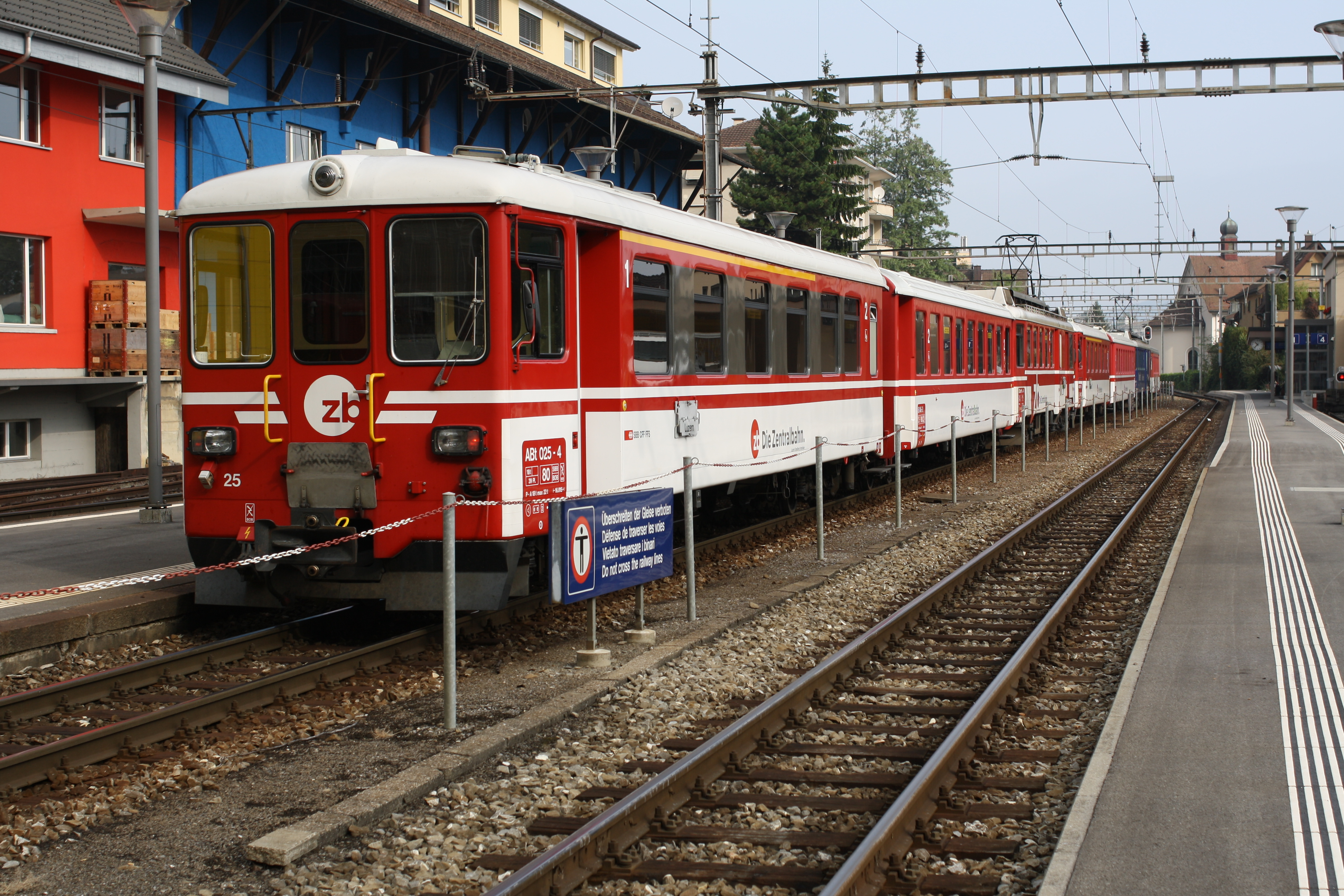
- A Zentralbahn train at the station in 2009

General information
- Location: Bahnhofstrasse; Hergiswil; Switzerland
- Coordinates: 46°58′57″N 8°18′37″E
- Elevation: 449 m (1,473 ft)
- Owner: Zentralbahn
- Lines: Brünig line; Luzern–Stans–Engelberg line
- Train operators: Zentralbahn

Services
Preceding station	Lucerne S-Bahn	Following station
Stansstad towards Wolfenschiessen	S4	Hergiswil Matt towards Lucerne
Stansstad towards Stans	S44	Lucerne Terminus
Alpnachstad towards Giswil	S5	Hergiswil Matt towards Lucerne
Alpnach Dorf towards Sachseln	S55	Lucerne Terminus
Location
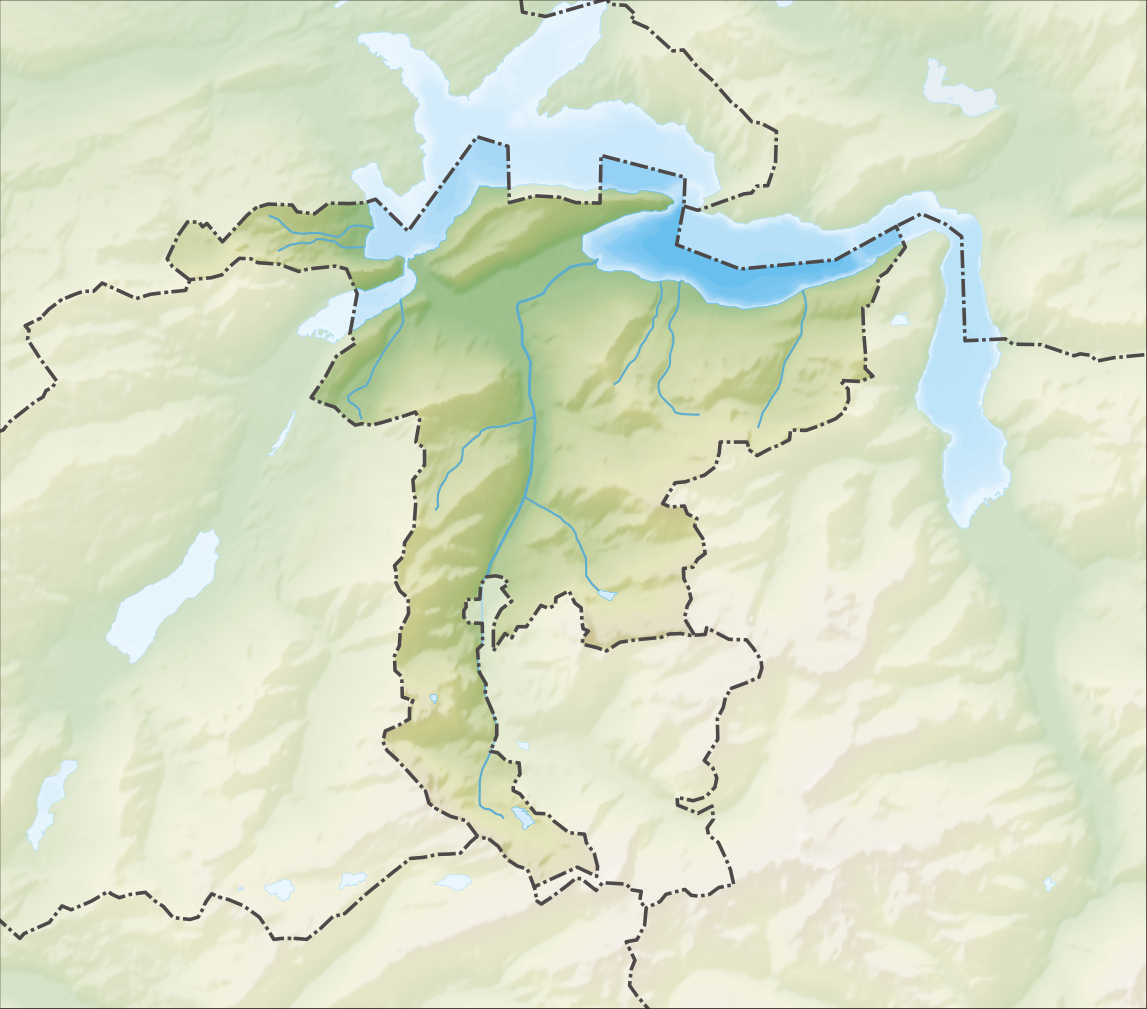
- Location within Switzerland Location within Canton of Nidwalden

Hergiswil railway station is a Swiss railway station in the municipality of Hergiswil in the canton of Nidwalden. It is at the junction of the Brünig line, which links Lucerne and Interlaken, and the Luzern–Stans–Engelberg line. Both lines are of metre gauge and owned by the Zentralbahn railway company. To the south of the station the Brünig line enters the Lopper I tunnel to Alpnach whilst the Luzern–Stans–Engelberg line enters the Lopper II tunnel to Stansstad.

Hergiswil station is one of two stations to serve Hergiswil, the other being Hergiswil Matt, which is on the Brünig line some 1.5 kilometres (0.93 mi) to the north.

== Services ==
The following services stop at Hergiswil:

- Lucerne S-Bahn:
  - S4/S5: service every fifteen minutes to Lucerne, every half-hour to Giswil or Stans, and every hour to Wolfenschiessen.
  - S44: rush-hour service between Lucerne and Stans.
  - S55: rush-hour service between Lucerne and Sachseln.
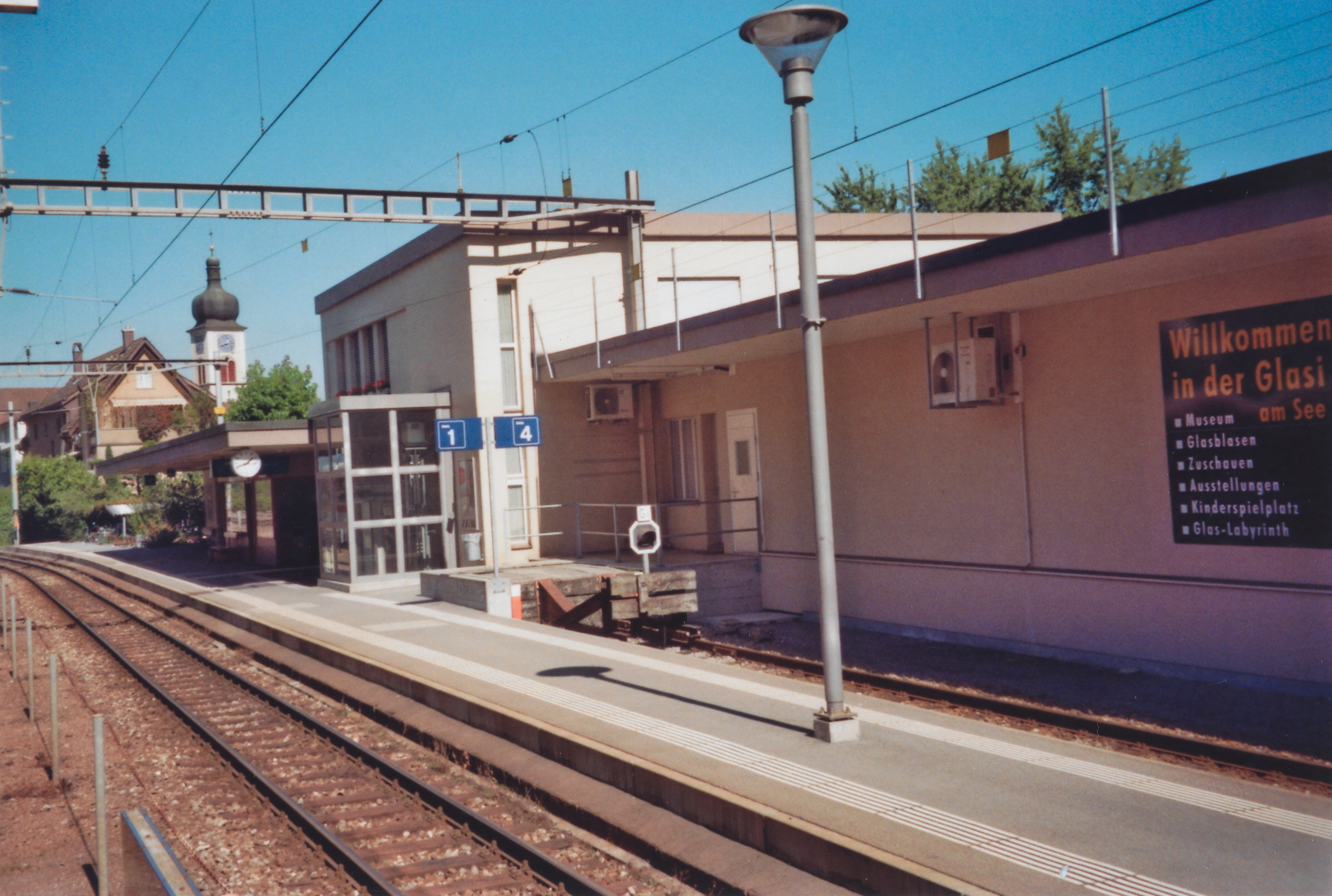
station building (2012)

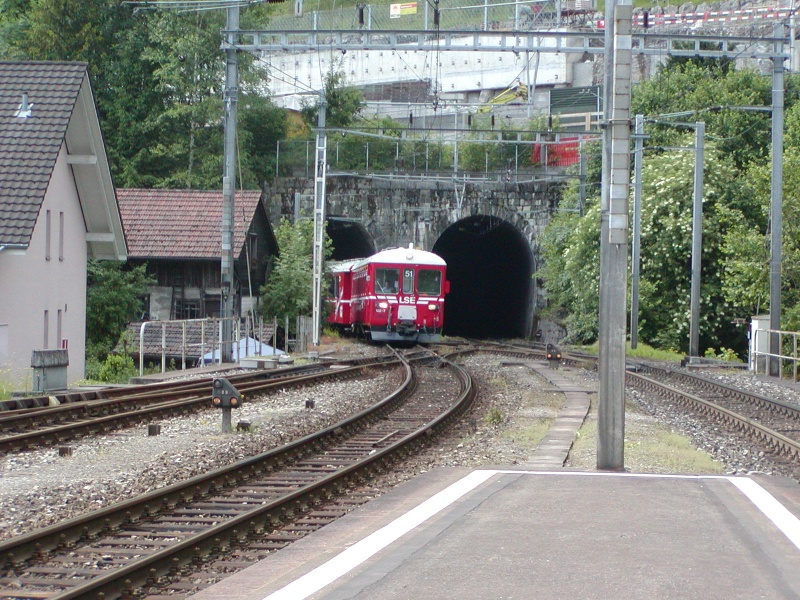
portals of Looper tunnels south of the station (2007)

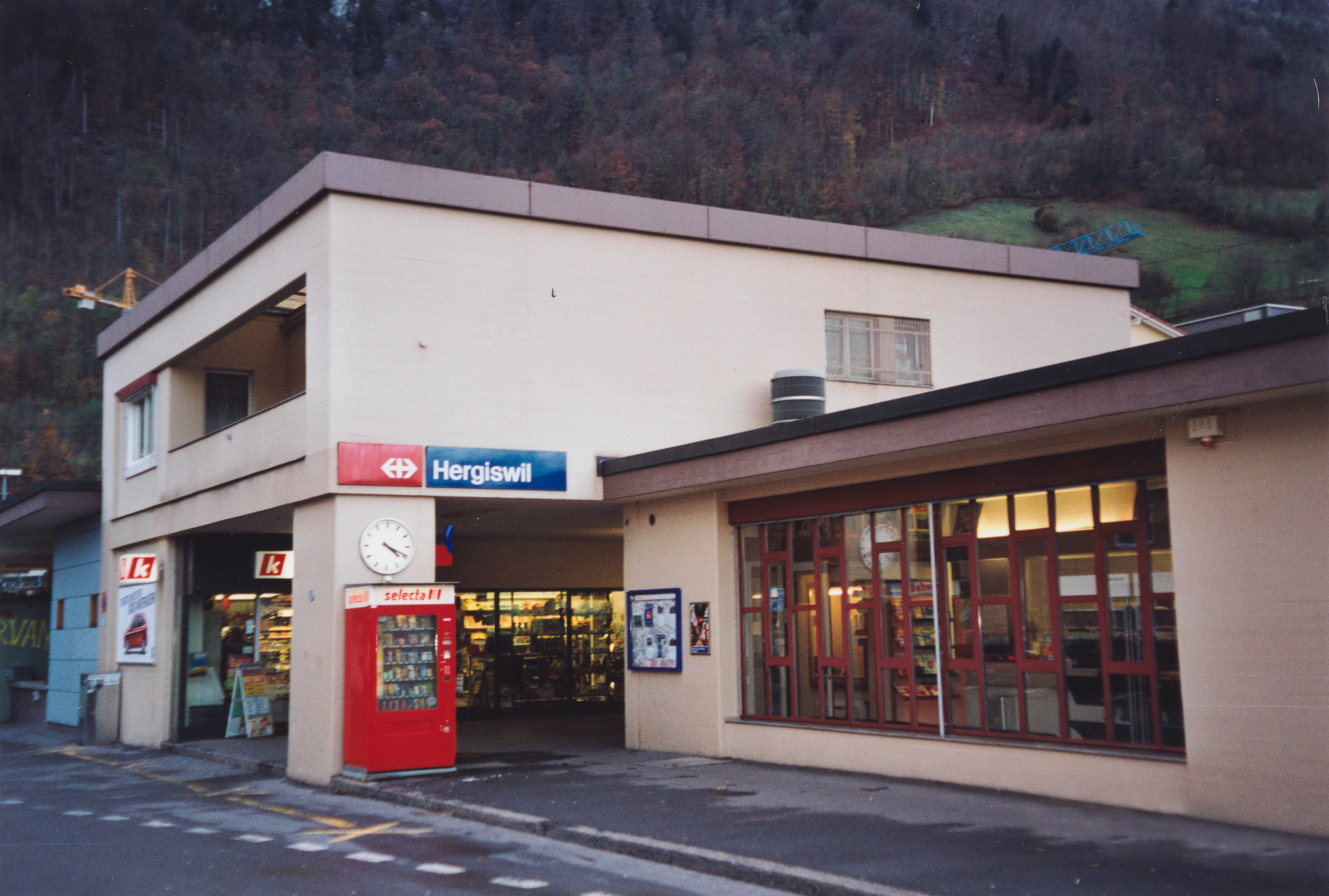
station building, street side (2004)
