= Gross Walenstock =

Mountain in Switzerland

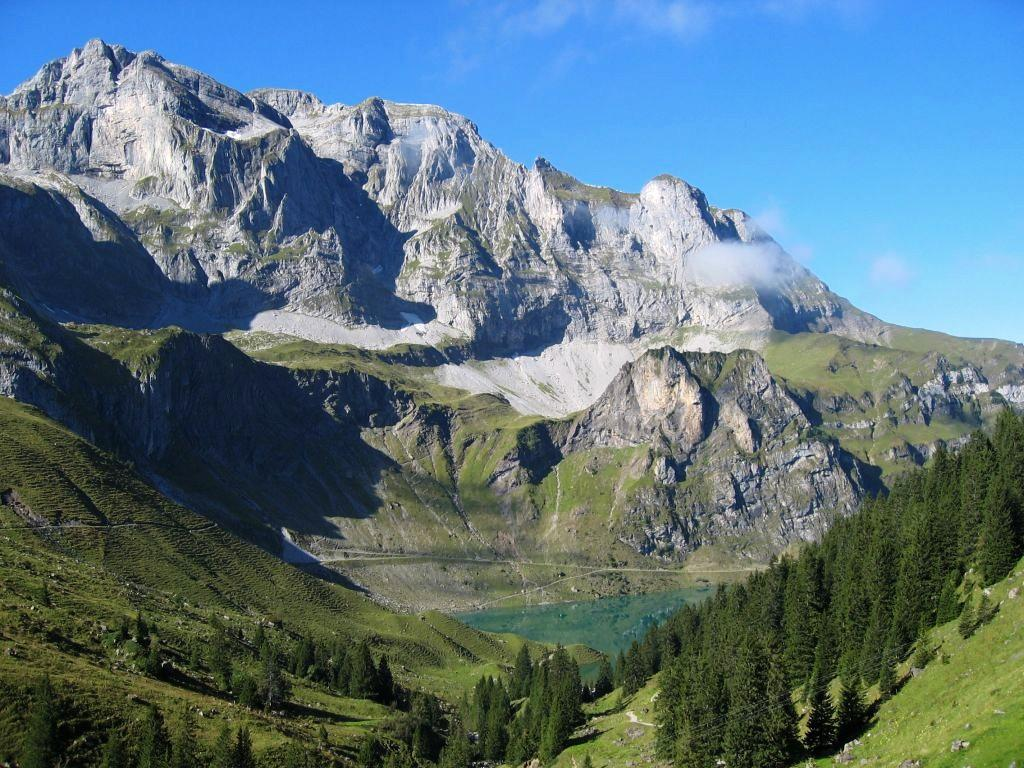
- The Gross Walenstock with the Bannalpsee

Highest point
- Elevation: 2,572 m (8,438 ft)
- Prominence: 32 m (105 ft)
- Parent peak: Rigidalstock
- Coordinates: 46°51′25.2″N 8°25′10.7″E

Geography
- Location within Switzerland
- Location: Nidwalden/Obwalden, Switzerland
- Parent range: Urner Alps

The Gross Walenstock is a mountain of the Urner Alps, located on the border between the cantons of Nidwalden and Obwalden in Central Switzerland. On its northern side it overlooks the Bannalpsee.

The Gross Walenstock is part of the group named Walenstöcke.

The closest localities are Oberrickenbach (Nidwalden) and Engelberg (Obwalden).
