= Rigidalstock =

Mountain in Switzerland

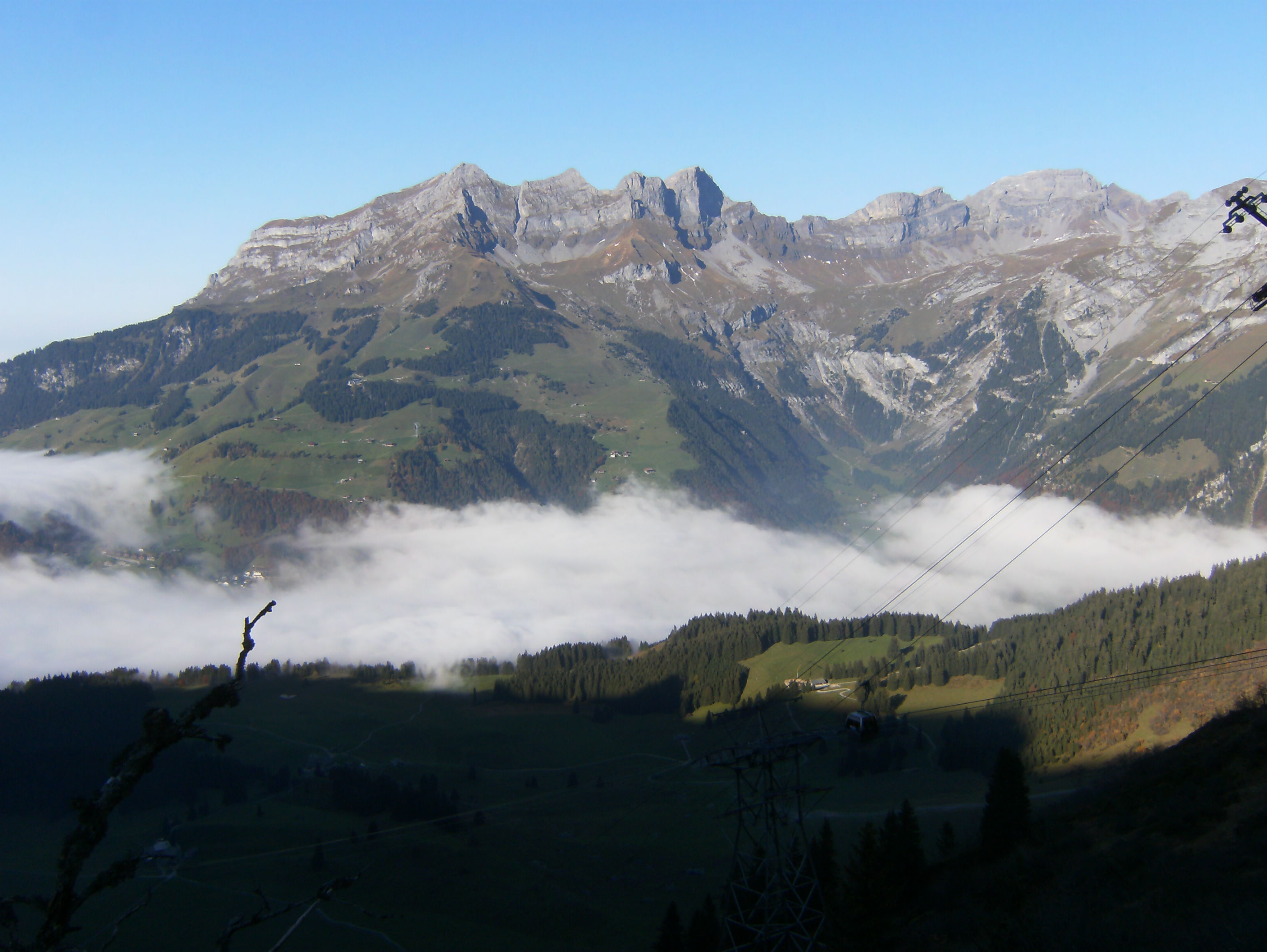
- Rigidalstock (left) from the south.

Highest point
- Elevation: 2,593 m (8,507 ft)
- Prominence: 133 m (436 ft)
- Parent peak: Gross Sättelistock
- Coordinates: 46°51′08″N 8°25′10.7″E

Geography
- Location within Switzerland
- Location: Nidwalden/Obwalden, Switzerland
- Parent range: Urner Alps

The Rigidalstock is a mountain of the Urner Alps, located on the border between the cantons of Nidwalden and Obwalden in Central Switzerland. It lies south of the Gross Walenstock.

The closest locality is Engelberg on its southern side.
