= Aareschlucht Ost MIB railway station =

Train station in Switzerland

Aareschlucht Ost MIB
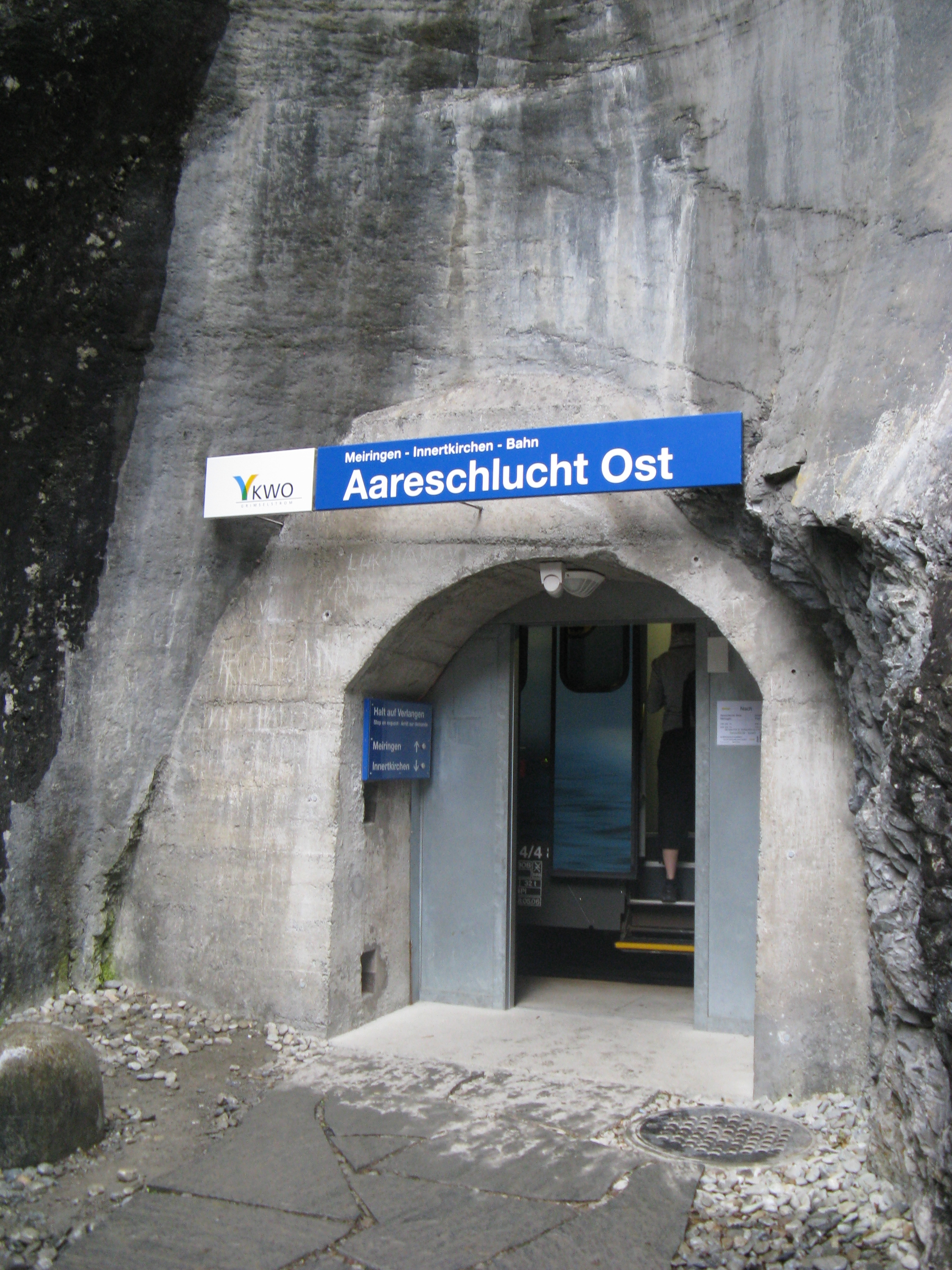
- The station entrance in 2009

General information
- Location: Innertkirchen, Bern; Switzerland
- Coordinates: 46°42′43″N 8°13′04″E
- Elevation: 618 m (2,028 ft)
- Owner: Meiringen-Innertkirchen-Bahn
- Line: Meiringen–Innertkirchen line
- Distance: 3.4 km (2.1 mi) from Meiringen
- Platforms: 1 side platform
- Tracks: 1
- Train operators: Meiringen-Innertkirchen-Bahn

Other information
- Fare zone: 812 (Libero)

Services
Preceding station	Meiringen-Innertkirchen-Bahn	Following station
Aareschlucht West towards Meiringen	Regio	Innertkirchen Unterwasser towards Innertkirchen MIB
Location

Aareschlucht Ost MIB railway station (German: Bahnhof Aareschlucht Ost MIB) is a railway station in the municipality of Innertkirchen, in the Swiss canton of Bern. It is located on the 1,000 mm (3 ft 3 3/8 in) Meiringen–Innertkirchen line of the Meiringen-Innertkirchen-Bahn (MIB). Unusually, the station is located inside a tunnel that runs parallel to the Aare Gorge (German: Aareschlucht).

== Services ==
As of the December 2020 timetable change, the following services stop at Aareschlucht Ost MIB:

- Regio: half-hourly service between Meiringen and Innertkirchen MIB.
