= Innertkirchen Unterwasser railway station =

Train station in Switzerland

Innertkirchen Unterwasser
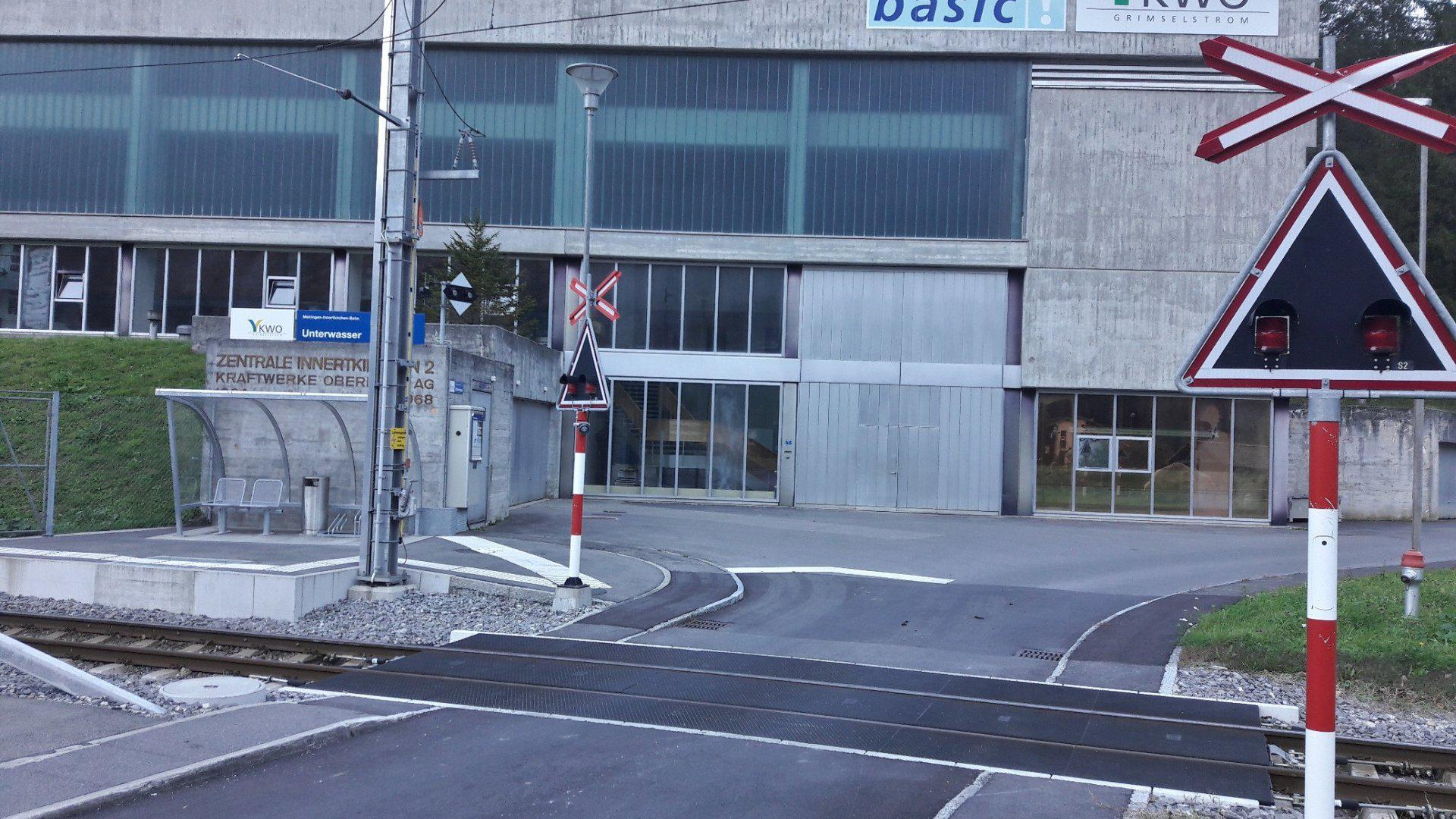
- The station platform in 2018

General information
- Location: Innertkirchen, Bern; Switzerland
- Coordinates: 46°42′29″N 8°13′34″E
- Elevation: 624 m (2,047 ft)
- Owner: Meiringen-Innertkirchen-Bahn
- Line: Meiringen–Innertkirchen line
- Distance: 4.2 km (2.6 mi) from Meiringen
- Platforms: 1 side platform
- Tracks: 1
- Train operators: Meiringen-Innertkirchen-Bahn

Other information
- Fare zone: 812 (Libero)

Services
Preceding station	Meiringen-Innertkirchen-Bahn	Following station
Aareschlucht Ost MIB towards Meiringen	Regio	Innertkirchen Grimseltor towards Innertkirchen MIB
Location

Innertkirchen Unterwasser railway station (German: Bahnhof Innertkirchen Unterwasser) is a railway station in the municipality of Innertkirchen, in the Swiss canton of Bern. It is located on the 1,000 mm (3 ft 3 3/8 in) Meiringen–Innertkirchen line of the Meiringen-Innertkirchen-Bahn (MIB). The station sits at the confluence of the Aare and Gadmerwasser rivers.

== Services ==
As of the December 2020 timetable change, the following services stop at Innertkirchen Unterwasser:

- Regio: half-hourly service between Meiringen and Innertkirchen MIB.
