= Aareschlucht West railway station =

Railway station in Bern, Switzerland

Aareschlucht West
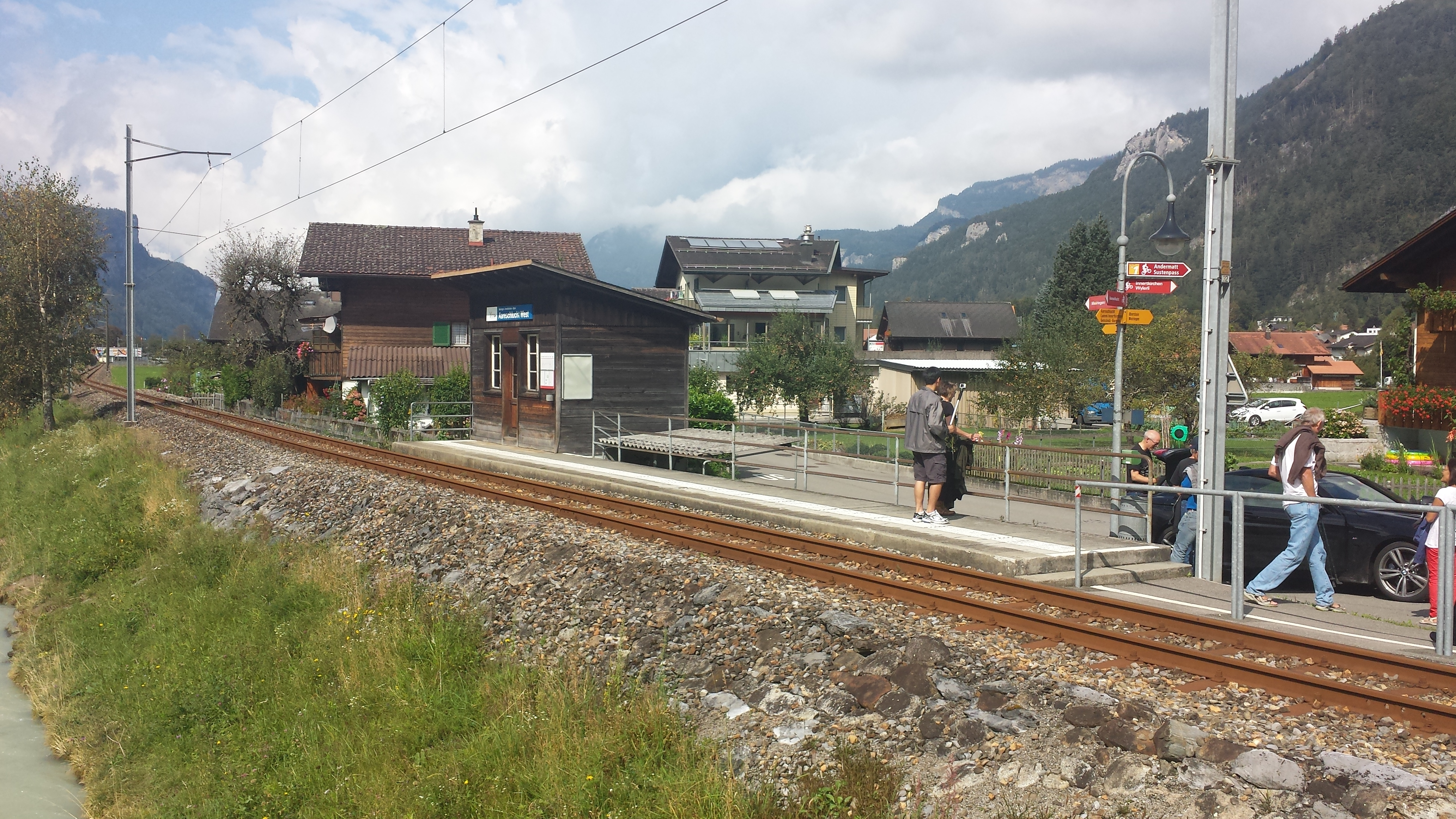
- The station platform in 2014; the photographer is standing on a footbridge that crosses the Aare

General information
- Location: Meiringen, Bern; Switzerland
- Coordinates: 46°43′16″N 8°11′55″E
- Elevation: 604 m (1,982 ft)
- Owner: Meiringen-Innertkirchen-Bahn
- Line: Meiringen–Innertkirchen line
- Distance: 1.4 km (0.87 mi) from Meiringen
- Platforms: 1 side platform
- Tracks: 1
- Train operators: Meiringen-Innertkirchen-Bahn

Other information
- Fare zone: 812 (Libero)

Services
Preceding station	Meiringen-Innertkirchen-Bahn	Following station
Meiringen Alpbach towards Meiringen	Regio	Aareschlucht Ost MIB towards Innertkirchen MIB
Location

Aareschlucht West railway station (German: Bahnhof Aareschlucht West) is a railway station in the municipality of Meiringen, in the Swiss canton of Bern. It is located on the 1,000 mm (3 ft 3 3/8 in) Meiringen–Innertkirchen line of the Meiringen-Innertkirchen-Bahn (MIB). The station is adjacent to the Aare river and located just west of the Aare Gorge (German: Aareschlucht).

The station is named "West" as opposed to the station Aareschlucht Ost MIB railway station, "East" of the gorge.

== Services ==
As of the December 2020 timetable change, the following services stop at Aareschlucht West:

- Regio: half-hourly service between Meiringen and Innertkirchen MIB.

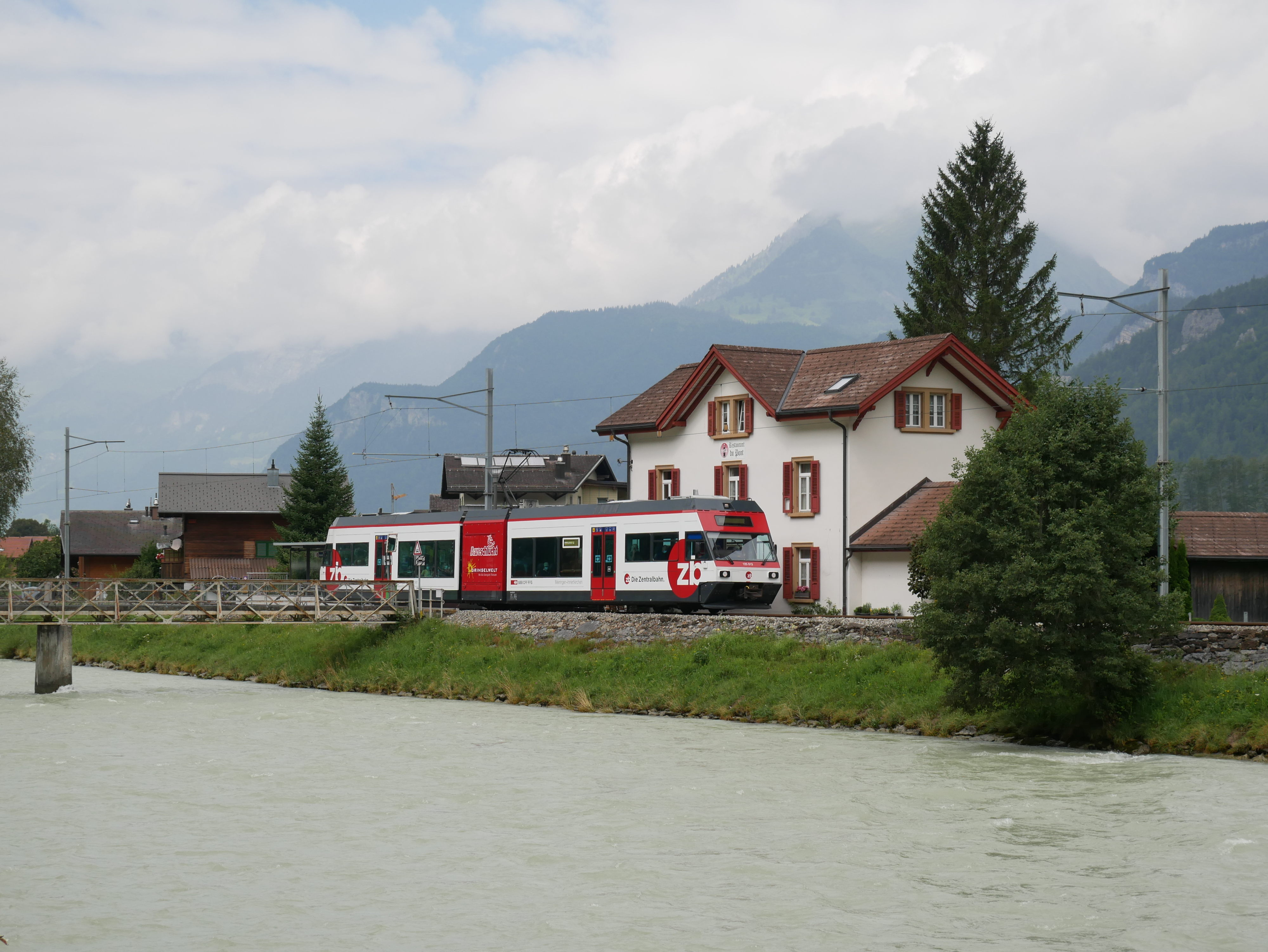
Train departing to Innertkirchen (2021)
