= Meiringen Alpbach railway station =

Train station in Switzerland

Meiringen Alpbach
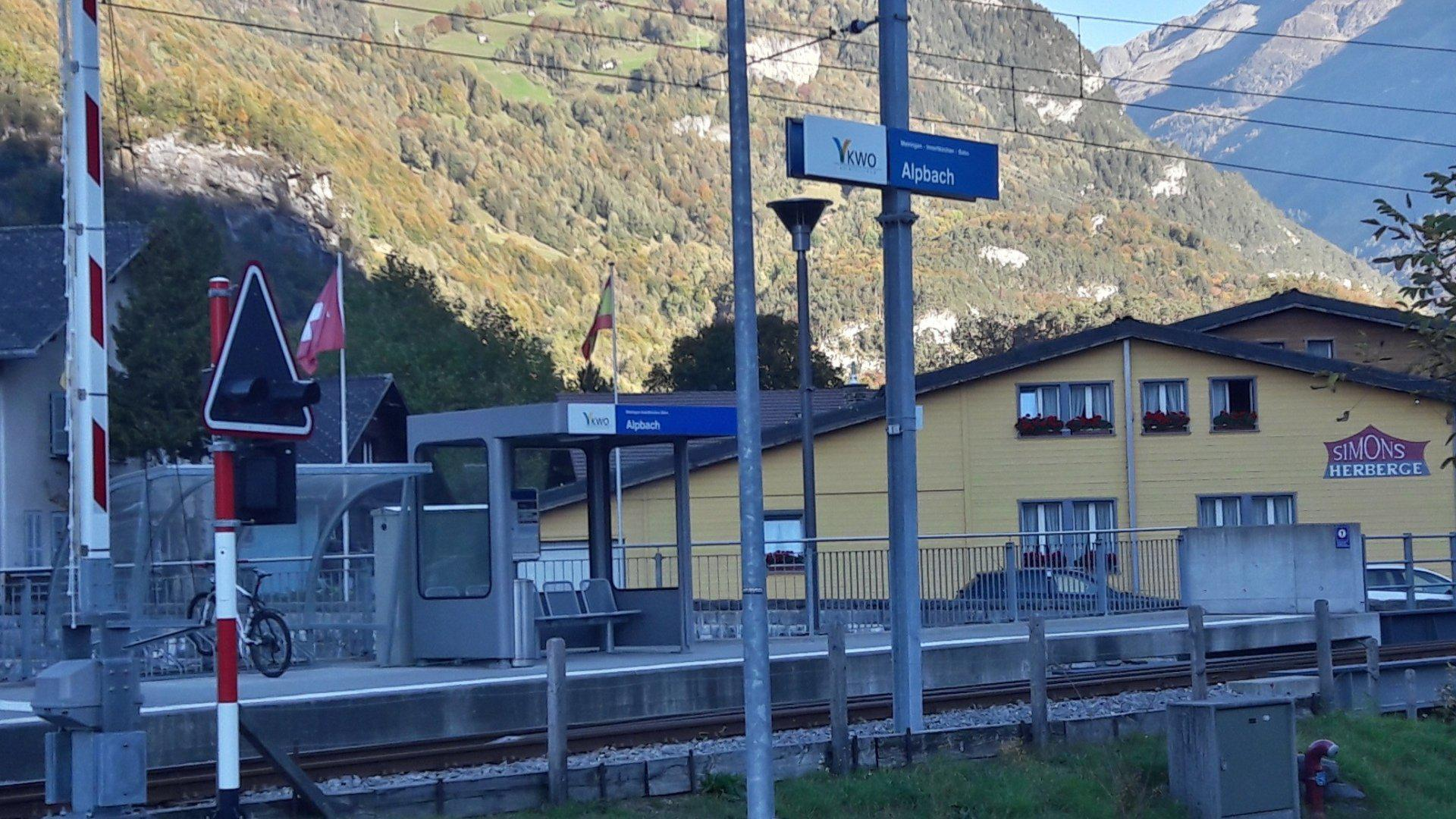
- The station platform in 2018

General information
- Location: Meiringen, Bern; Switzerland
- Coordinates: 46°43′23″N 8°11′24″E
- Elevation: 602 m (1,975 ft)
- Owner: Meiringen-Innertkirchen-Bahn
- Line: Meiringen–Innertkirchen line
- Distance: 0.7 km (0.43 mi) from Meiringen
- Platforms: 1 side platform
- Tracks: 1
- Train operators: Meiringen-Innertkirchen-Bahn
- Connections: PostAuto Schweiz bus lines

Other information
- Fare zone: 812 (Libero)

Services
Preceding station	Meiringen-Innertkirchen-Bahn	Following station
Meiringen Terminus	Regio	Aareschlucht West towards Innertkirchen MIB
Location

Meiringen Alpbach railway station (German: Bahnhof Meiringen Alpbach) is a railway station in the municipality of Meiringen, in the Swiss canton of Bern. It is located on the 1,000 mm (3 ft 3 3/8 in) Meiringen–Innertkirchen line of the Meiringen-Innertkirchen-Bahn (MIB). The station is adjacent to the Alpbach river, which flows into the Aare at Meiringen.

The station is 500 m from the lower station of the Reichenbachfall Funicular.

== Services ==
Since the December 2020 timetable change, the following services stop at Meiringen Alpbach:

- Regio: half-hourly service between Meiringen and Innertkirchen MIB.
