= Innertkirchen Grimseltor railway station =

Train station in Switzerland

Innertkirchen Grimseltor
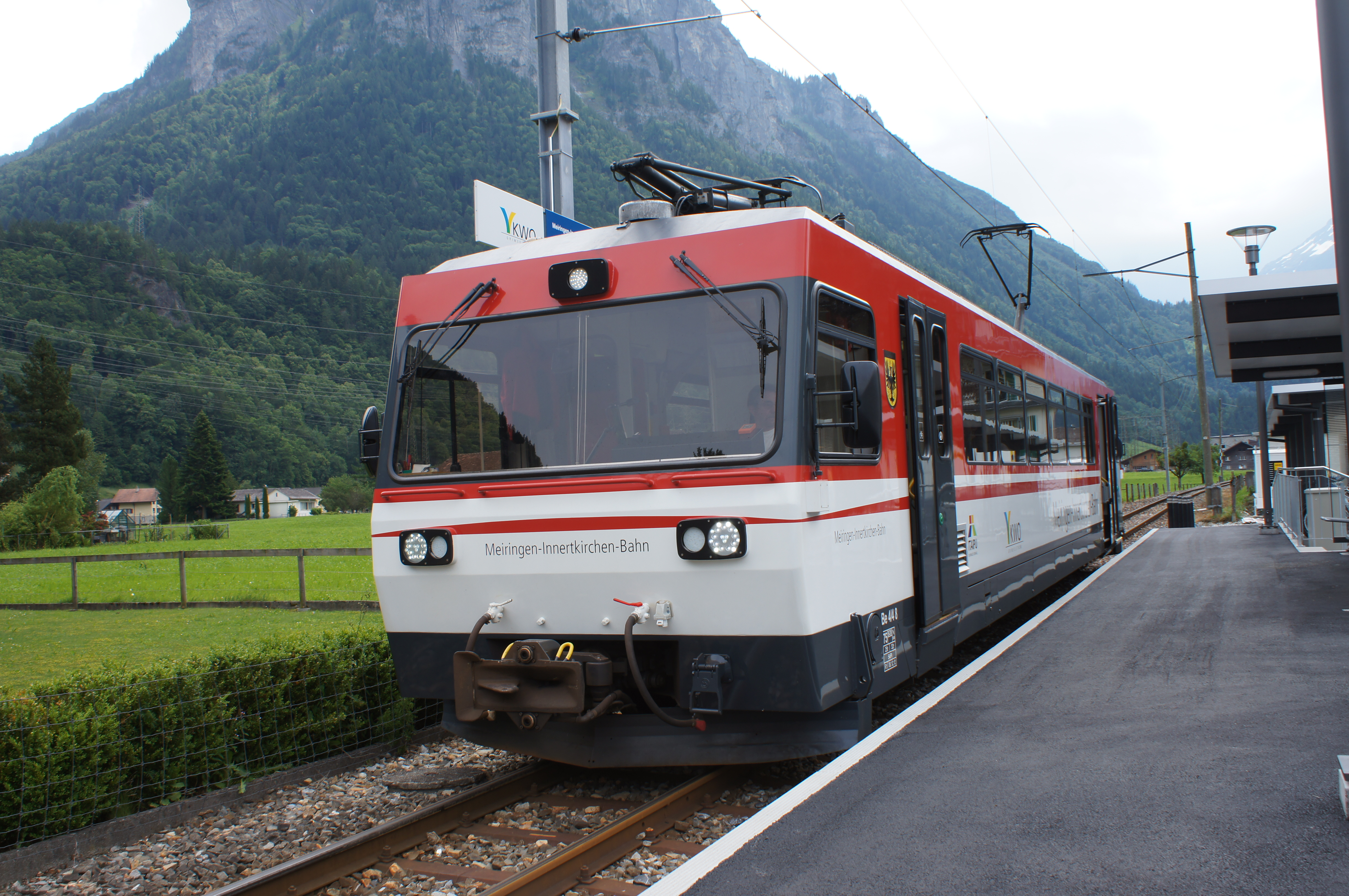
- An MIB train at the station in 2015

General information
- Location: Innertkirchen, Bern; Switzerland
- Coordinates: 46°42′20″N 8°13′47″E
- Elevation: 626 m (2,054 ft)
- Owner: Meiringen-Innertkirchen-Bahn
- Line: Meiringen–Innertkirchen line
- Distance: 4.4 km (2.7 mi) from Meiringen
- Platforms: 1 side platform
- Tracks: 1
- Train operators: Meiringen-Innertkirchen-Bahn
- Connections: PostAuto Schweiz bus lines

Other information
- Fare zone: 812 (Libero)

History
- Former names: Innertkirchen Post

Services
Preceding station	Meiringen-Innertkirchen-Bahn	Following station
Innertkirchen Unterwasser towards Meiringen	Regio	Innertkirchen MIB Terminus
Location

Innertkirchen Grimseltor railway station (German: Bahnhof Innertkirchen Grimseltor), formerly Innertkirchen Post, is a railway station in the municipality of Innertkirchen, in the Swiss canton of Bern. It is located on the 1,000 mm (3 ft 3 3/8 in) Meiringen–Innertkirchen line of the Meiringen-Innertkirchen-Bahn (MIB).

== Services ==
As of the December 2020 timetable change, the following services stop at Innertkirchen Grimseltor:

- Regio: half-hourly service between Meiringen and Innertkirchen MIB.
