= Grimsel Tunnel =

22 km base tunnel for power line and railways in Switzerland

Logo

The Grimsel Tunnel (German: Grimseltunnel) is a proposed 21.72-kilometre (13.50 mi) tunnel for power transmission and rail transport in Switzerland. As of 2016, it was planned to run under the Grimsel Pass and link the Zentralbahn at the north end with the Matterhorn Gotthard Bahn at the south, and its construction is scheduled to begin in 2027.

The tunnel is proposed to carry a single-track metre gauge railway and railway electrification system. The total length of the new Grimsel Line (German: Grimselbahn) route containing the tunnel would be 21.75 kilometres (13.51 mi). It would link two groups of existing railway lines constructed to one-metre track gauge in Switzerland, forming a contiguous route of 844 kilometres (524 mi). The power transmission cables would run at 380kV and replace Swissgrid's existing overhead power line, and allow the removal of the 121 electricity pylons that had been in place for sixty years.

The intended railway route would continue from the Brünig railway line at Meiringen railway station, via the Meiringen–Innertkirchen railway, to a stop at Innertkirchen, then via new stations at Guttannen and Handegg (Handeck) to Oberwald railway station for continuation via the Furka Base Tunnel. Travel time between Meiringen and Oberwald would be approximately 38 minutes—a reduction of three hours.

A company called Grimselbahn AG was founded by the promoters, with Peter Teuscher as its chair person.

In 2016, the estimated cost was 580-million Swiss Francs. The split cost of 290-million Swiss Francs each for railway and power transmission usage would less than the individual estimated costs of 490-million Swiss Francs for a power-only tunnel or 430-million Swiss Francs for a rail-only tunnel. The tunnel route had first been proposed in 1860.

== Route ==
Planned route of the Grimsel Tunnel
Elevation	Portal	Location	Connection	Geo
650 m	North portal	Innertkirchen	Meiringen–Innertkirchen Railway	46.7°N 8.24°E
1057 m	Guttannen station	Guttannen		46.657°N 8.29°E
1327 m	Handegg station	Handegg	Gelmer Funicular	46.615°N 8.31°E
1368 m	South portal	Oberwald/Obergesteln	Matterhorn Gotthard Bahn	46.52°N 8.33°E
1366 m	Oberwald station	Oberwald	Furka Cogwheel Steam Railway	46.531°N 8.343°E
