= Track gauge in Switzerland =

Switzerland has an extensive network of 1,000 mm (3 ft 3 3/8 in) metre gauge railways, many of which interchange traffic (most prominent is the Rhaetian Railway). They are concentrated in the more heavily mountainous areas. The Jungfrau Railway terminates at the highest station in Europe. Dual gauge (combined metre- and standard gauge trackway) also exists in many areas. Also, nearly all street tramways in Switzerland have always been meter gauge.

== Gauge changing trains ==
Since December 2022, 1,435 mm (4 ft 8 1/2 in)/1,000 mm (3 ft 3 3/8 in) gauge changing trains have started operating between Lake Geneva and Interlaken. Zweisimmen is the location of the gauge change. While the carriage gauge is changed, the locomotives do not change gauge and they have to be interchanged.

== See also ==
- Rail transport in Switzerland
