= Bäuert =

In some areas of Switzerland (Berner Oberland or Graubünden) a Bäuert is a small farming community. It is a type of agricultural cooperative with shared equipment and land.
