= Aare Gorge =

River gorge near the town of Meiringen, in the Bernese Oberland, Switzerland

Coordinates: 46°43′4″N 8°12′49″E

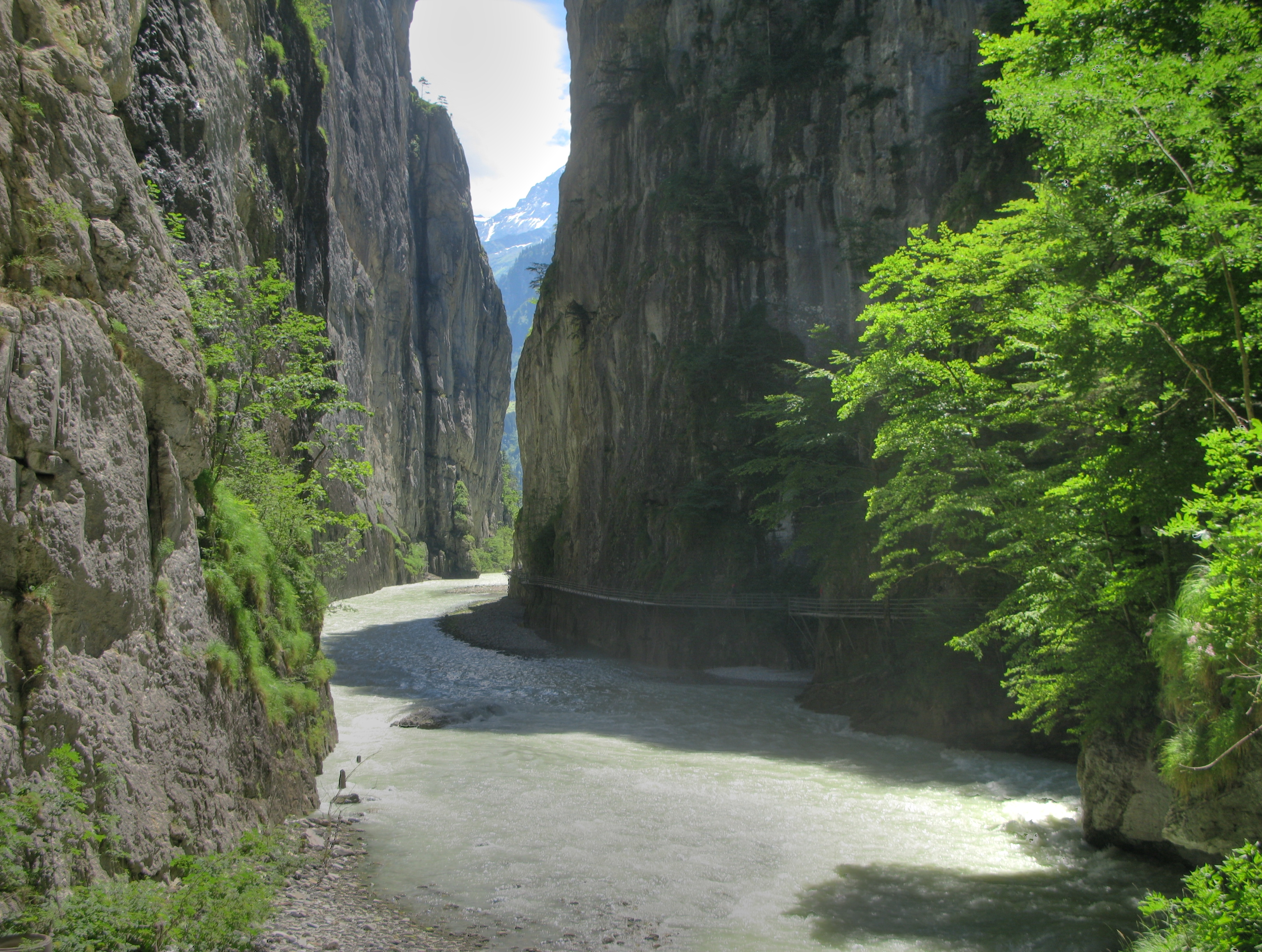
Inside the Aare Gorge, with walkway visible on far wall

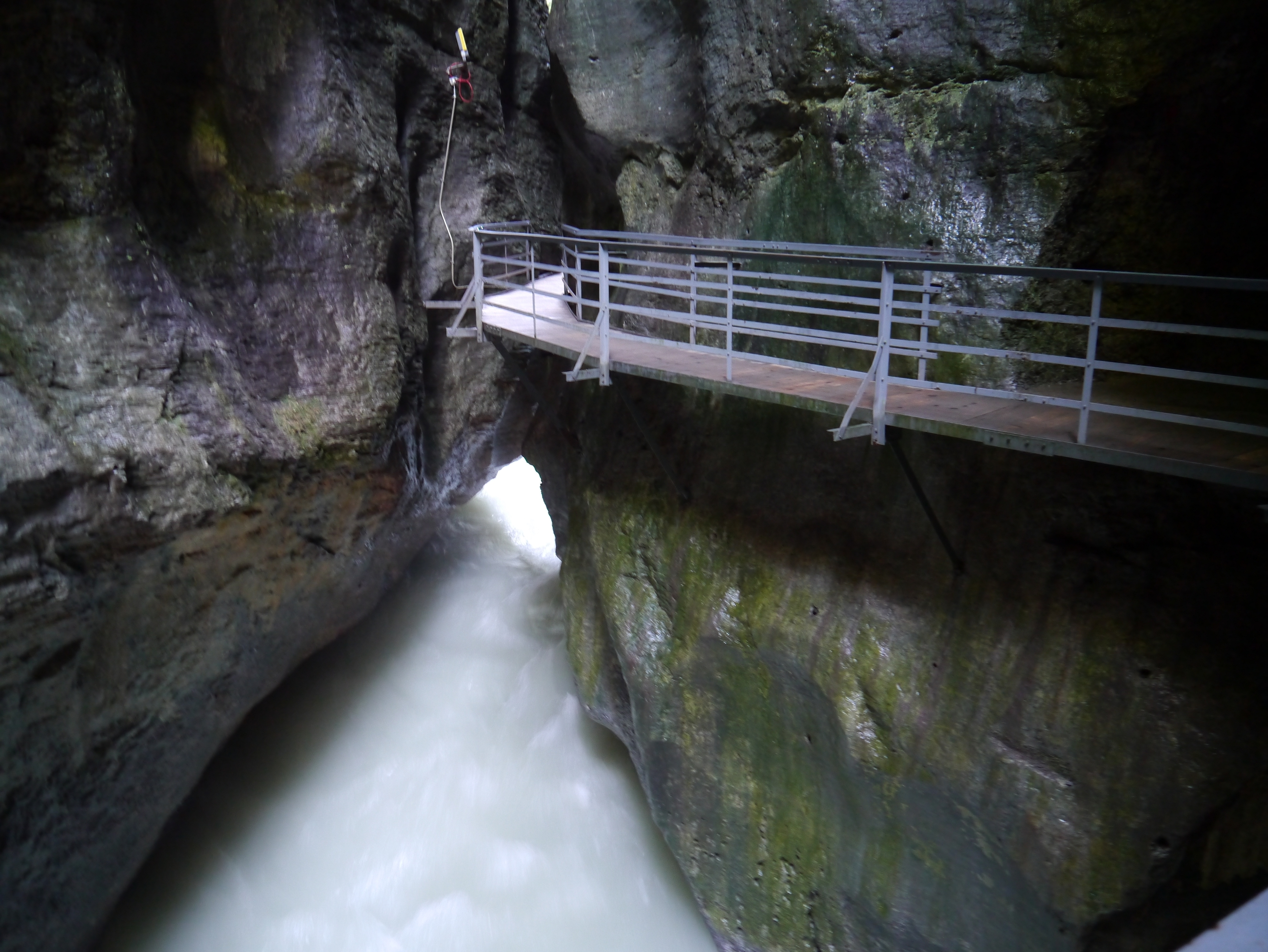
The gorge at a narrow point

The Aare Gorge (German: Aareschlucht) is a section of the river Aare that carves through a limestone ridge near the town of Meiringen, in the Bernese Oberland region of Switzerland. The gorge is an indirect product of glaciation; 10,000 years ago, just as the Ice Age was coming to an end, torrential runoff water from melting glaciers eroded a deep, narrow chasm through the limestone barrier. Although barely 2 kilometres (1 mi) long, this passage is bordered by sheer cliffs up to 50 m (160 ft) high on either side. The gorge varies in width from some 30 metres (98 ft) at its widest to just 1 metre (3 ft 3 in) at its narrowest.

The gorge is a popular tourist attraction, many visitors attracted by the nearby Reichenbach Falls, which Sir Arthur Conan Doyle selected as the setting for Sherlock Holmes' murder by Professor Moriarty.

Permission to build walking paths along the Gorge was granted in 1887, and the walkway has been open to the public since 1889. From 1912 until 1956, the Meiringen–Reichenbach–Aareschlucht tramway linked the gorge's western entrance to Meiringen; since 1946 the Meiringen-Innertkirchen railway has also served the same purpose. The restaurant and kiosk at the western entrance were first built in 1928 and reconstructed in 1987. In 2003, a station was built on the railway to serve the eastern entrance, along with a suspension bridge to link the station and entrance; a bistro and kiosk were added to this entrance in 2008.

The path through the gorge is accessed by entrances at each end of the gorge, where an admission charge is levied. For most of its length the path is a wooden construction on a metal frame cantilevered out from the wall of the gorge, with short stretches in tunnel. The entrances are each linked to stations on the Meiringen-Innertkirchen railway, with Aareschlucht West station at the western end of the gorge, and the underground Aareschlucht Ost station connecting to the eastern entrance.

== See also ==
- List of canyons
- Tourism in Switzerland
