= Innertkirchen =

- Municipality
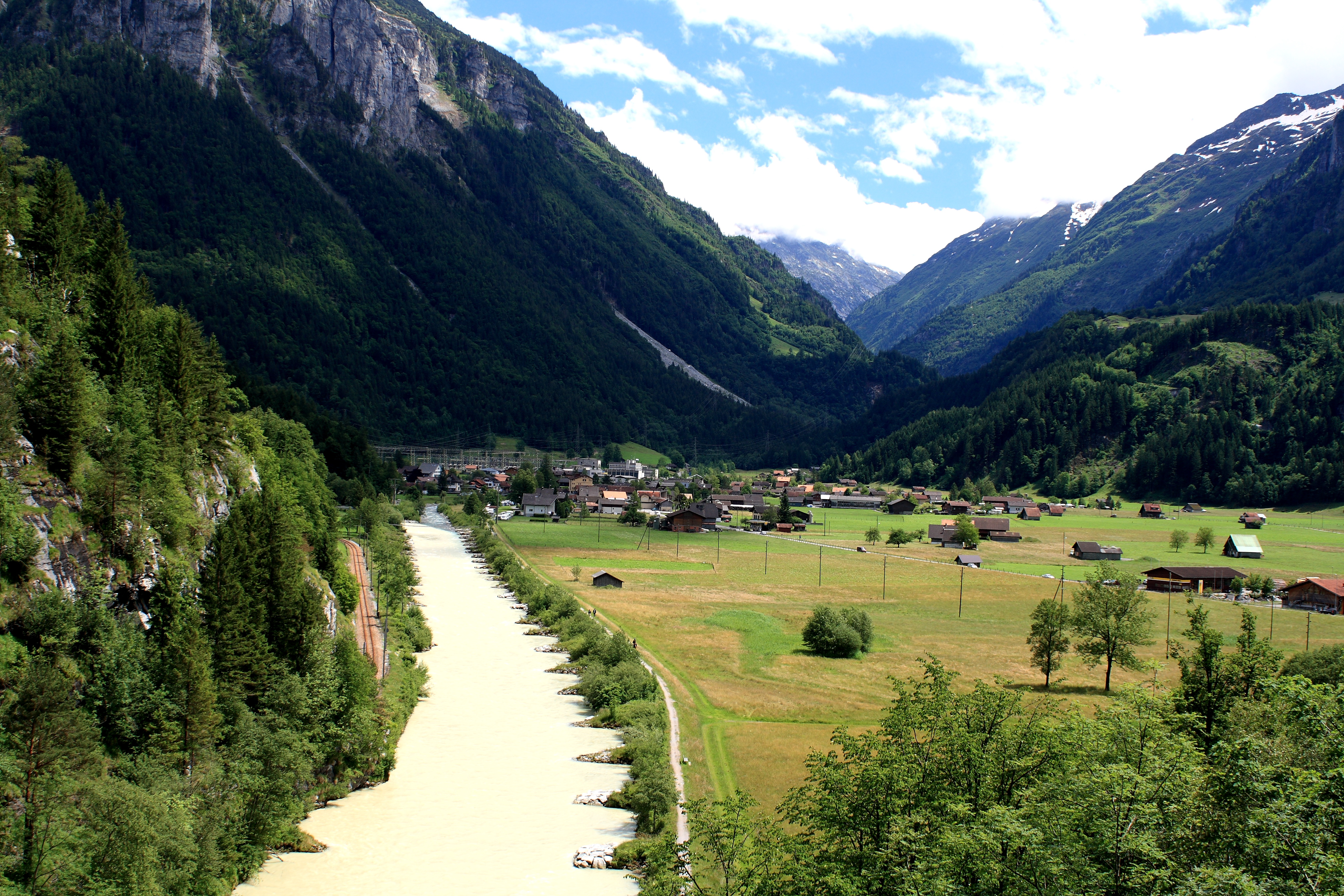
- View of Innertkirchen from the river Aare

- Flag Coat of arms
- Location of Innertkirchen
- Location within Switzerland Location within Canton of Bern
- Coordinates: 46°42′N 8°14′E
- Country: Switzerland
- Canton: Bern
- District: Interlaken-Oberhasli

Government
  - Executive: Gemeinderat with 7 members
  - Mayor: Gemeindepräsident(in); Lorenz Moor (as of 2026)

Area
  - Total: 236.5 km^{2} (91.3 sq mi)
- Elevation: 625 m (2,051 ft)

Population (December 2020)
  - Total: 1,072
  - Density: 4.533/km^{2} (11.74/sq mi)
- Time zone: UTC+01:00 (CET)
  - Summer (DST): UTC+02:00 (CEST)
- Postal code: 3862-63
- SFOS number: 784
- ISO 3166 code: CH-BE
- Surrounded by: Engelberg (OW), Gadmen, Grindelwald, Guttannen, Hasliberg, Kerns (OW), Meiringen, Schattenhalb, Wolfenschiessen (NW)
- Website: www.innertkirchen.ch

Innertkirchen is a village and municipality in the Interlaken-Oberhasli administrative district in the canton of Bern in Switzerland. On 1 January 2014, the former municipality of Gadmen was merged into the municipality of Innertkirchen.

== History ==
=== Innertkirchen ===
Aerial view (1956)

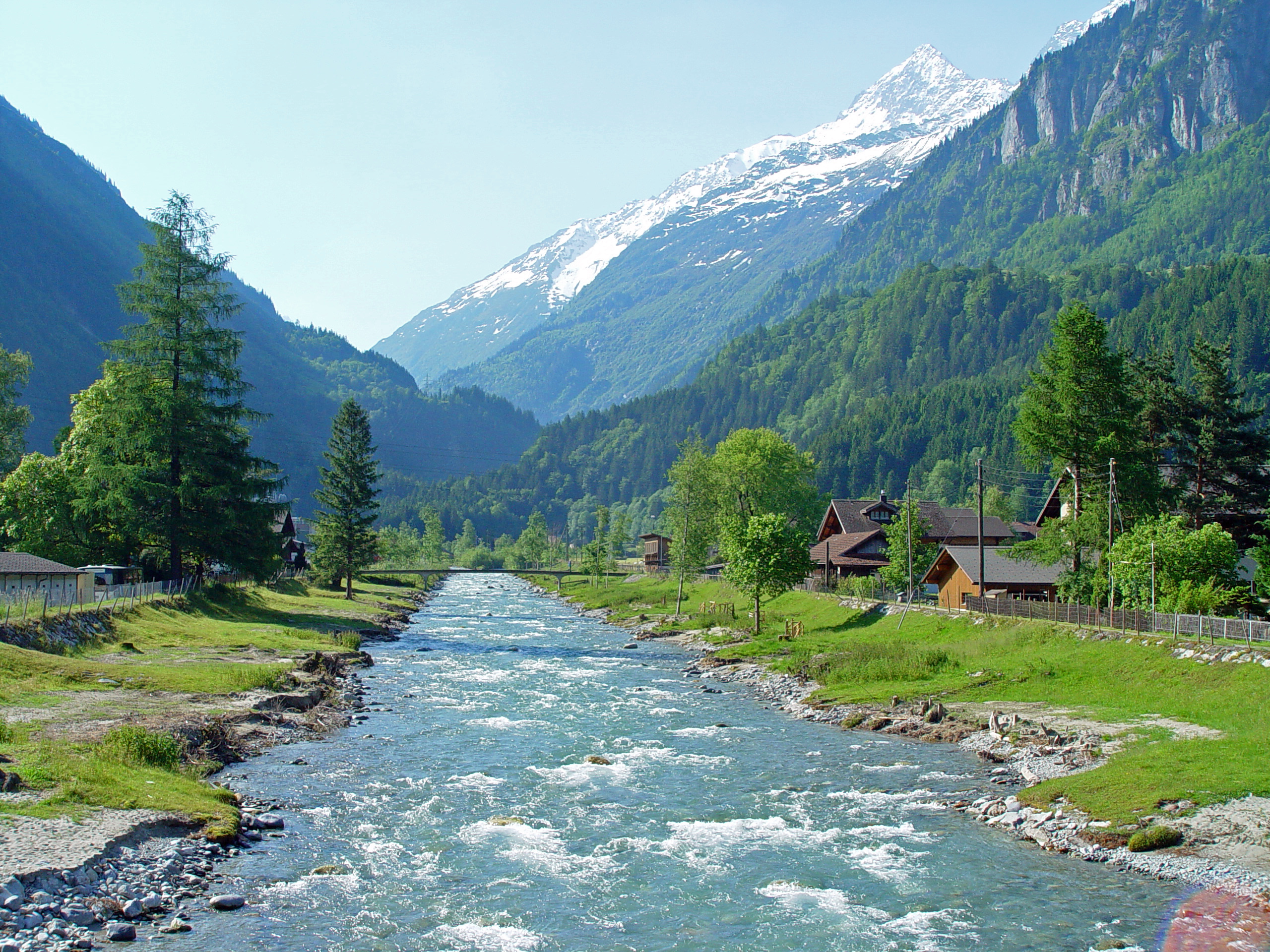
The River Aare and narrow valley at Innertkirchen

Map of the power plants and water courses of the KWO system

The name of the municipality is of recent origin and first appeared in print in 1834. It was formed from the farming settlements (Bäuerten) of Grund, Bottigen, Wyler-Schattseite, Wyler-Sonnseite and the agricultural cooperative of Äppigen.

Both Roman coins and the remains of a Roman rest station have been found in the municipality. During the Middle Ages a number of small farming communities developed in the high valleys and alpine meadows of the modern municipality. Originally they were under the authority of the Imperial Vogtei of Hasli, which was acquired by Bern in 1334. Under Bernese rule, a number of distant landowners ruled over the small communities. At around the same time they became part of the parish of Meiringen. In 1713, the communities of Innertkirchen united with the municipalities of Gadmen and Guttannen to form the parish of Hasle. When Gadmen and Guttannen became independent parishes in 1816, Innertkirchen rejoined Meiringen. A filial church was built in Grund in 1835 and in 1860, it became the center of the Innertkirchen parish.

After 1334 the communities banded together into Bäuerten to share and regulate usage of the seasonal alpine meadows and farm land. Beginning in the 15th century the Bäuerten often squabbled with neighboring communities and Engelberg Abbey over land rights and the borders between municipalities. The border between Bern and Unterwalden was not officially set until 1828-29. Until the 20th century, the villages economies relied on seasonal alpine herding to raise horses, cattle and to produce cheese as well as trade over the Grimsel Pass, the Susten Pass and the local Joch Pass. An iron mine, blast furnace and forge were built in Wyler in the 16th century. It remained in operation until the 19th century.

The villages that made up Innertkirchen remained small. In 1783, the largest settlement, Brügg only had 32 houses and the entire Grund Bäuert, consisting of Brügg, Winkel and Unterstock had a total of 62. In 1814, the road from Meiringen through Innertkirchen and over the Susten Pass began to open up the villages to the outside world. This was followed in 1873 by a road over the Grimsel Pass and in 1957 by the Engstlenalp road. In the 19th century over-exploitation of the forests caused flooding and increased avalanches. This coupled with a growing population and limited farmland forced many residents to emigrate to escape poverty and starvation. In 1925, the Oberhasli AG company (later KWO) built power plants in the municipality, providing jobs and improving the standard of living. Construction for the power plants also opened Innertkirchen up to tourism. Today KWO is the main employer in Innertkirchen. Tourism is an important secondary industry and very few residents are involved in agriculture full-time.

=== Gadmen ===
Gadmen is first mentioned in 1382 as im Gadmen.

During the Middle Ages, the Gadmen area was part of the Vogtei of Hasli and part of the Meiringen parish. In 1334 the entire Vogtei was acquired by Bern. During the Middle Ages a chapel was built in the village. In 1713 Gadmen became part of the parish of Innertkirchen and in 1722 the chapel expanded into a filial church. In 1816 the church became a parish church and Gadmen became an independent parish.

The residents of the village generally lived on farming, seasonal alpine herding and from traffic over the Susten Pass. During the 19th century, the farms became increasing mechanized and many residents were forced to emigrate to North America for jobs. The construction of the Susten Road in 1939-45 opened up the village to tourism and provided additional jobs. During construction and after its completion, the Oberhasli AG power plant became the largest employer in the municipality.

== Geography ==
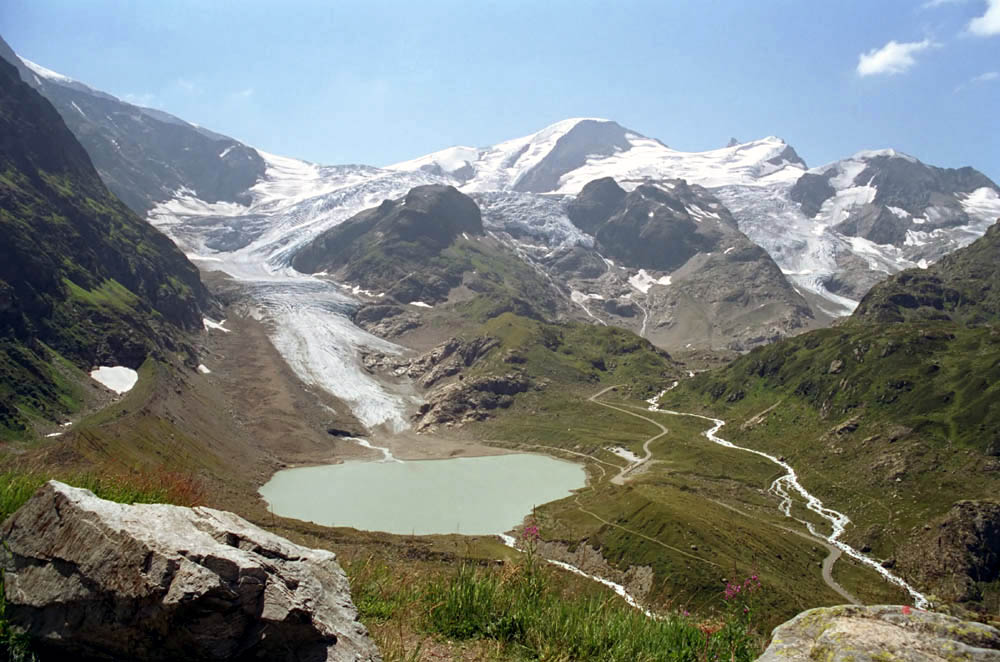
View of Steinsee and Gadmen from the Susten Pass

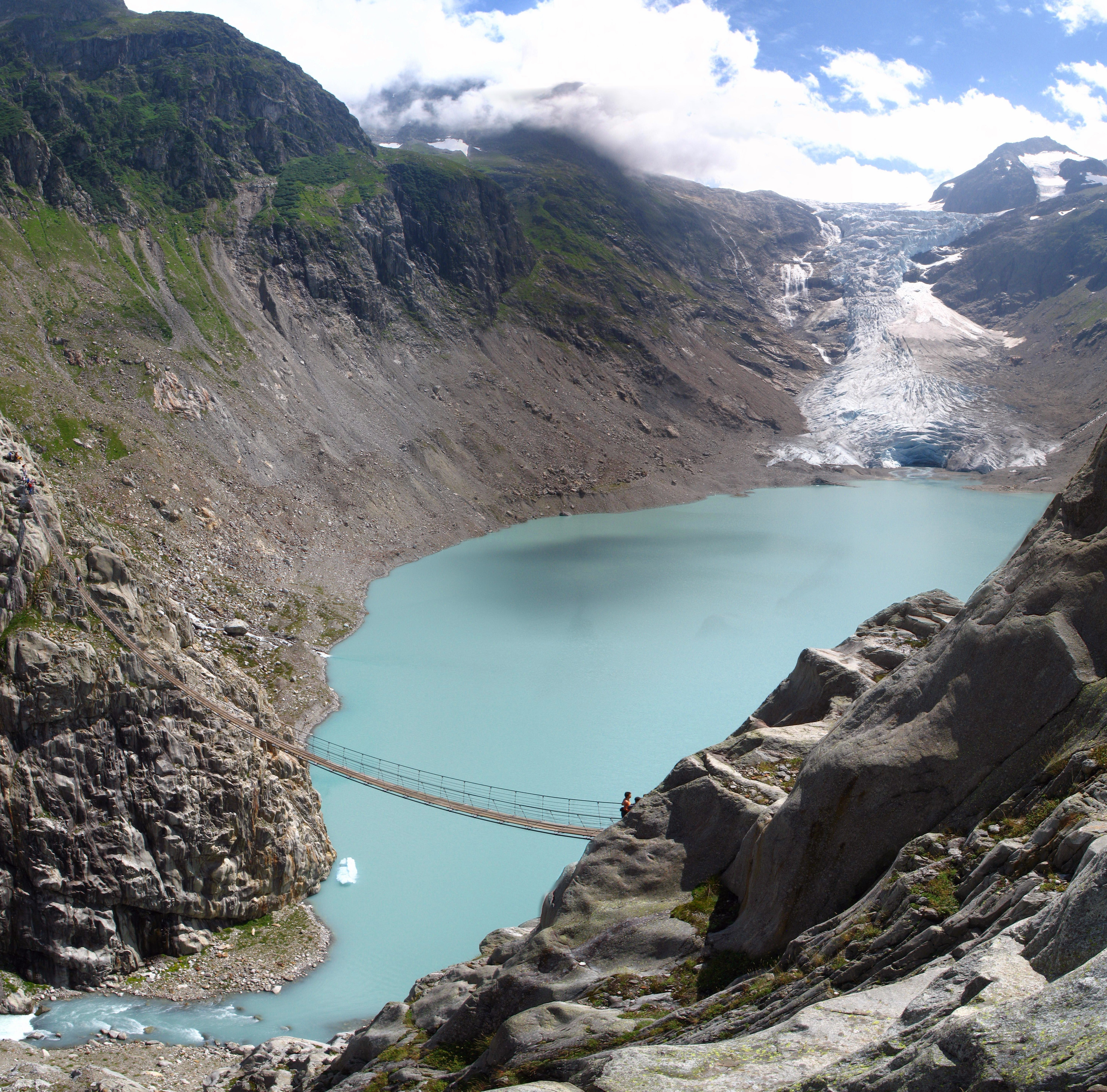
Trift Glacier and lake in Gadmen

After the merger Innertkirchen has an area of 236.61 km^{2} (91.36 sq mi). Before the merger it had an area of 120.05 square kilometers (46.35 sq mi). As of 2012, a total of 18.77 km^{2} (7.25 mi^{2}) or 15.6% is used for agricultural purposes, while 24.15 km^{2} (9.32 mi^{2}) or 20.1% is forested. The rest of the municipality is 0.92 km^{2} (0.36 mi^{2}) or 0.8% is settled (buildings or roads), 1.97 km^{2} (0.76 mi^{2}) or 1.6% is either rivers or lakes and 74.18 km^{2} (28.64 mi^{2}) or 61.8% is unproductive land.

During the same year, housing and buildings made up 0.3% and transportation infrastructure made up 0.3%. All of the forested land area is covered with heavy forests. Of the agricultural land, 2.4% is pasturage and 13.2% is used for alpine pastures. Of the water in the municipality, 0.8% is in lakes and 0.8% is in rivers and streams. Of the unproductive areas, 11.5% is unproductive vegetation, 29.0% is too rocky for vegetation and 21.3% of the land is covered by glaciers.

The large alpine municipality is located at the confluence of the Urbach and Gadmer streams into the Aare river. It includes the Urbach valley, the Gadmen valley, the Gen valley, the Wetterhorn mountain and the Gauli Glacier. Innertkirchen was created out of the Bäuerten (farming communities) of Grund, Bottigen, Wyler-Schattseite, Wyler-Sonnseite and the agricultural cooperative of Äppigen in 1834. The merger with Gadmen almost doubled the size the municipality. Gadmen lies in the Bernese Oberland with the Susten Pass on the eastern border of the former municipality. The municipal borders stretch from the valley floor, with an elevation of 850–1,250 m (2,790–4,100 ft), up to the nearby mountain peaks at about 3,500 m (11,500 ft). It is located on the border of the Canton of Bern with the Cantons of Obwalden, Nidwalden, Uri and Valais.

The municipality of Gadmen merged on 1 January 2014 into the municipality of Innertkirchen.

On 31 December 2009 Amtsbezirk Oberhasli, the municipality's former district, was dissolved. On the following day, 1 January 2010, it joined the newly created Verwaltungskreis Interlaken-Oberhasli.

== Coat of arms ==
The blazon of the municipal coat of arms is Per chevron inverted Or an Eagle displayed Sable crowned of the first and Gules.

== Demographics ==
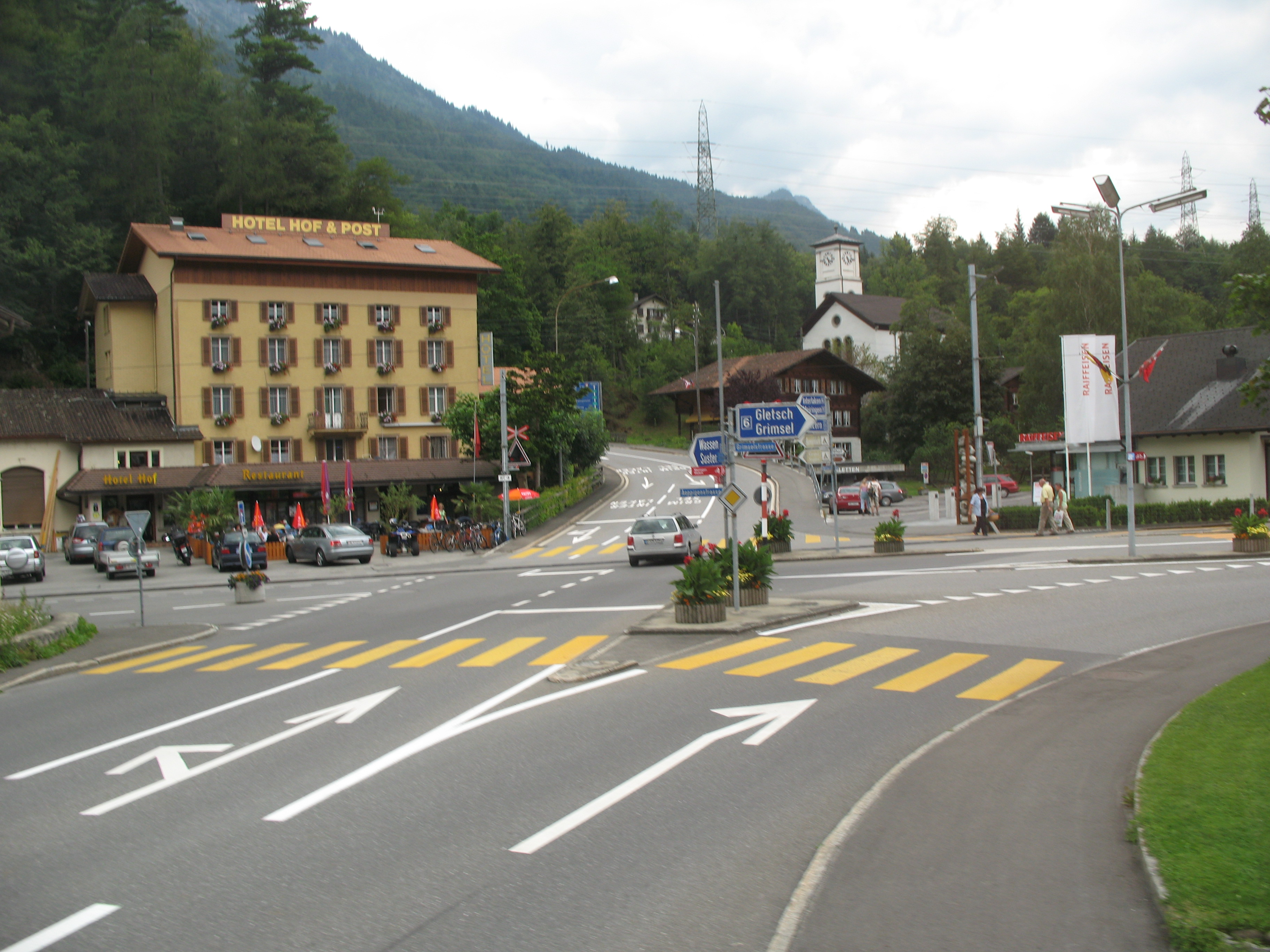
Center of Innertkirchen, at the crossroads between the Susten and Grimsel Pass

After the merger Innertkirchen has a population (as of December 2020) of 1,072. As of 2011, 6.7% of the population are resident foreign nationals. Over the last year (2010-2011) the population has changed at a rate of -2.3%. Migration accounted for -4.2%, while births and deaths accounted for -0.2%.

Most of the population (as of 2000) speaks German (893 or 95.4%) as their first language, Portuguese is the second most common (10 or 1.1%) and Italian is the third (6 or 0.6%). There are 4 people who speak French.

As of 2008, the population was 49.7% male and 50.3% female. The population was made up of 400 Swiss men (46.7% of the population) and 26 (3.0%) non-Swiss men. There were 402 Swiss women (46.9%) and 29 (3.4%) non-Swiss women. Of the population in the municipality, 406 or about 43.4% were born in Innertkirchen and lived there in 2000. There were 290 or 31.0% who were born in the same canton, while 110 or 11.8% were born somewhere else in Switzerland, and 77 or 8.2% were born outside of Switzerland.

As of 2011, children and teenagers (0–19 years old) make up 19.1% of the population, while adults (20–64 years old) make up 60.8% and seniors (over 64 years old) make up 20.1%.

As of 2000, there were 350 people who were single and never married in the municipality. There were 493 married individuals, 58 widows or widowers and 35 individuals who are divorced.

As of 2010, there were 109 households that consist of only one person and 23 households with five or more people. In 2000, a total of 365 apartments (74.8% of the total) were permanently occupied, while 87 apartments (17.8%) were seasonally occupied and 36 apartments (7.4%) were empty. The vacancy rate for the municipality, in 2010, was 1.09%. In 2011, single family homes made up 53.6% of the total housing in the municipality.

== Historic population ==
The historical population is given in the following chart:

== Heritage sites of national significance ==
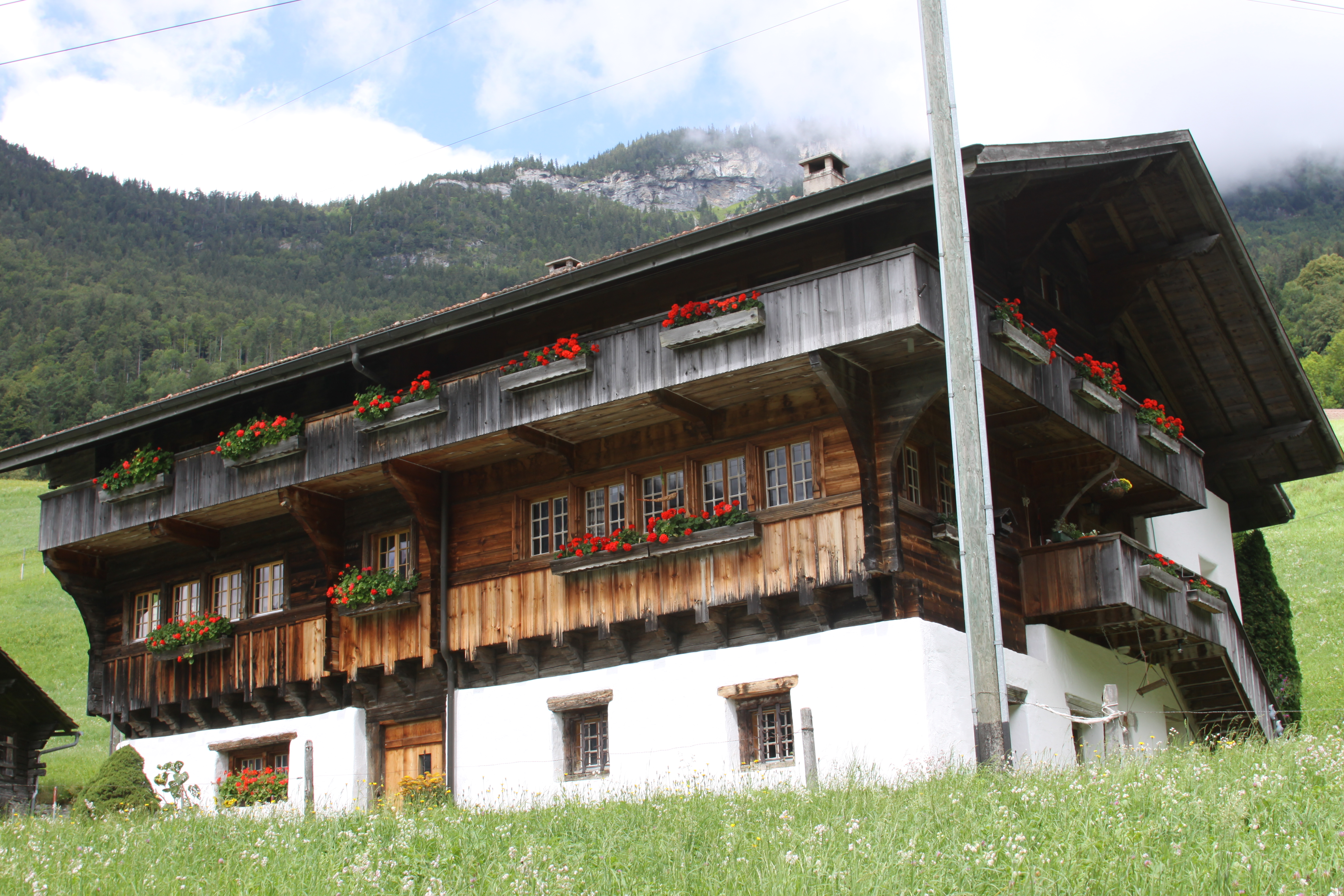
Feldhaus Wyler Sunnsiten

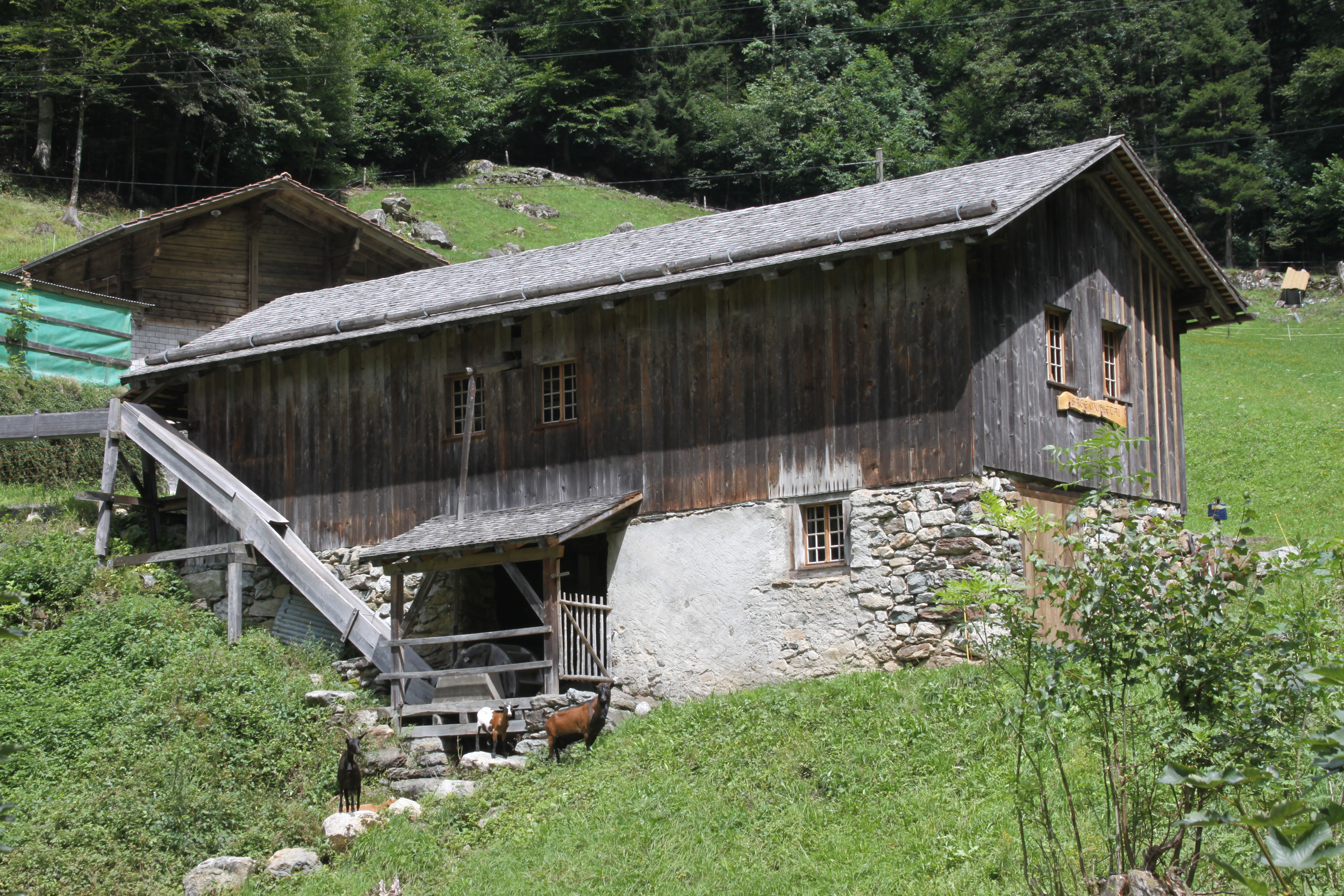
Saw Mill in the Mühletal

The Feldhaus Wyler Sunnsiten at Feldweg 6 and the saw mill at Uesers Milital 642 B are listed as Swiss heritage site of national significance.

== Politics ==
In the 2011 federal election the most popular party was the Swiss People's Party (SVP) which received 55.7% of the vote. The next three most popular parties were the Conservative Democratic Party (BDP) (15.8%), the Social Democratic Party (SP) (8.4%) and the FDP.The Liberals (6.6%). In the federal election, a total of 329 votes were cast, and the voter turnout was 49.4%.

== Industry ==
The village has access to considerable reserves of running water and two hydropower plants provide around 1,500 million kWh of power per annum, as well as employment for 220 persons.

== Economy ==
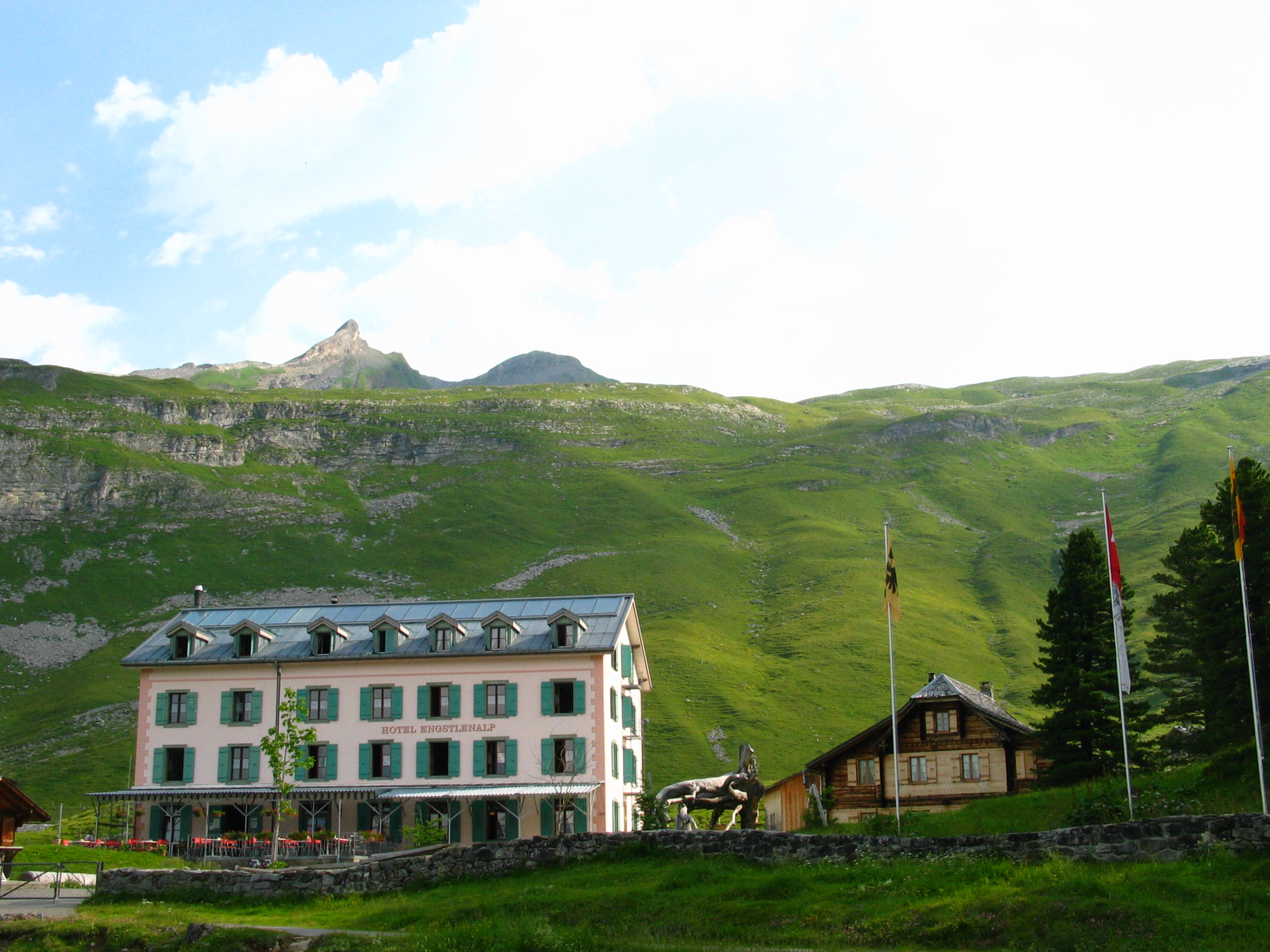
Hotel Engstlenalp in Innertkirchen

As of 2011, Innertkirchen had an unemployment rate of 0.65%. As of 2008, there were a total of 603 people employed in the municipality. Of these, there were 91 people employed in the primary economic sector and about 34 businesses involved in this sector. 351 people were employed in the secondary sector and there were 17 businesses in this sector. 161 people were employed in the tertiary sector, with 33 businesses in this sector. There were 474 residents of the municipality who were employed in some capacity, of which females made up 38.8% of the workforce.

In 2008 there were a total of 489 full-time equivalent jobs. The number of jobs in the primary sector was 56, of which 50 were in agriculture and 5 were in forestry or lumber production. The number of jobs in the secondary sector was 310 of which 17 or (5.5%) were in manufacturing and 57 (18.4%) were in construction. The number of jobs in the tertiary sector was 123. In the tertiary sector; 17 or 13.8% were in wholesale or retail sales or the repair of motor vehicles, 17 or 13.8% were in the movement and storage of goods, 44 or 35.8% were in a hotel or restaurant, 6 or 4.9% were the insurance or financial industry, 16 or 13.0% were technical professionals or scientists, 7 or 5.7% were in education and 8 or 6.5% were in health care.

In 2000, there were 213 workers who commuted into the municipality and 210 workers who commuted away. The municipality is a net importer of workers, with about 1.0 workers entering the municipality for every one leaving. A total of 264 workers (55.3% of the 477 total workers in the municipality) both lived and worked in Innertkirchen. Of the working population, 17.7% used public transportation to get to work, and 46.4% used a private car.

In 2011 the average local and cantonal tax rate on a married resident, with two children, of Innertkirchen making 150,000 CHF was 12.3%, while an unmarried resident's rate was 18.1%. For comparison, the average rate for the entire canton in the same year, was 14.2% and 22.0%, while the nationwide average was 12.3% and 21.1% respectively.

In 2009 there were a total of 361 tax payers in the municipality. Of that total, 122 made over 75,000 CHF per year. There were 2 people who made between 15,000 and 20,000 per year. The average income of the over 75,000 CHF group in Innertkirchen was 102,493 CHF, while the average across all of Switzerland was 130,478 CHF.

In 2011 a total of 1.2% of the population received direct financial assistance from the government.

== Religion ==
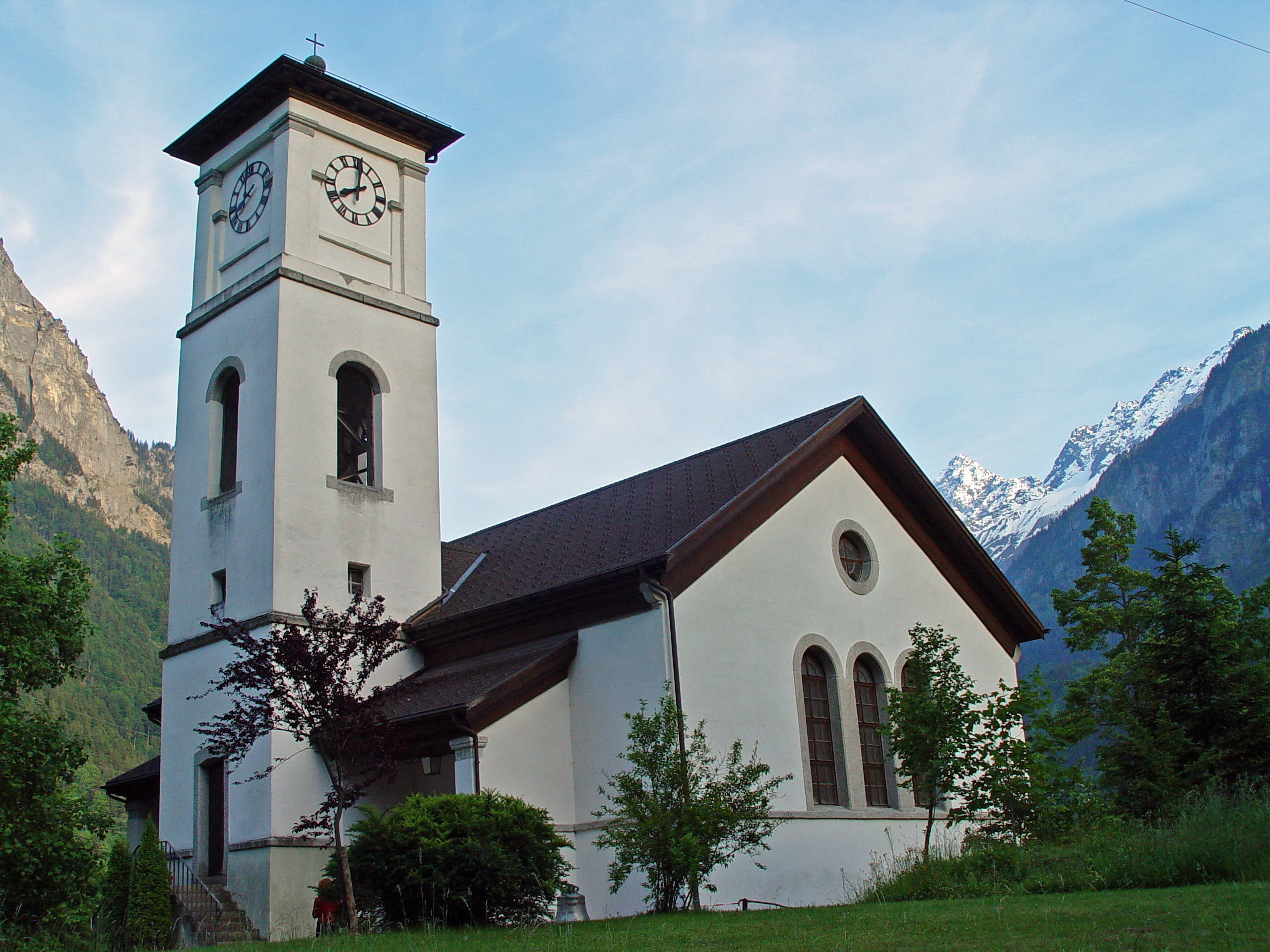
Innertkirchen Reformed church

From the 2000 census, 720 or 76.9% belonged to the Swiss Reformed Church, while 115 or 12.3% were Roman Catholic. Of the rest of the population, there were 3 members of an Orthodox church (or about 0.32% of the population), and there were 12 individuals (or about 1.28% of the population) who belonged to another Christian church. There was 1 individual who was Jewish, and 9 (or about 0.96% of the population) who were Muslim. There was 1 person who was Buddhist and 1 individual who belonged to another church. 36 (or about 3.85% of the population) belonged to no church, are agnostic or atheist, and 38 individuals (or about 4.06% of the population) did not answer the question.

== Education ==
In Innertkirchen about 59.5% of the population have completed non-mandatory upper secondary education, and 11.7% have completed additional higher education (either university or a Fachhochschule). Of the 65 who had completed some form of tertiary schooling listed in the census, 80.0% were Swiss men, 9.2% were Swiss women.

The Canton of Bern school system provides one year of non-obligatory Kindergarten, followed by six years of Primary school. This is followed by three years of obligatory lower Secondary school where the students are separated according to ability and aptitude. Following the lower Secondary students may attend additional schooling or they may enter an apprenticeship.

During the 2011-12 school year, there were a total of 86 students attending classes in Innertkirchen. There was one kindergarten class with a total of 10 students in the municipality. The municipality had 3 primary classes and 50 students. Of the primary students, 4.0% were permanent or temporary residents of Switzerland (not citizens) and 2.0% have a different mother language than the classroom language. During the same year, there was one lower secondary class with a total of 26 students. There were 15.4% who were permanent or temporary residents of Switzerland (not citizens) and 7.7% have a different mother language than the classroom language.

As of 2000, there were a total of 108 students attending any school in the municipality. Of those, 105 both lived and attended school in the municipality, while 3 students came from another municipality. During the same year, 33 residents attended schools outside the municipality.

== Transportation ==
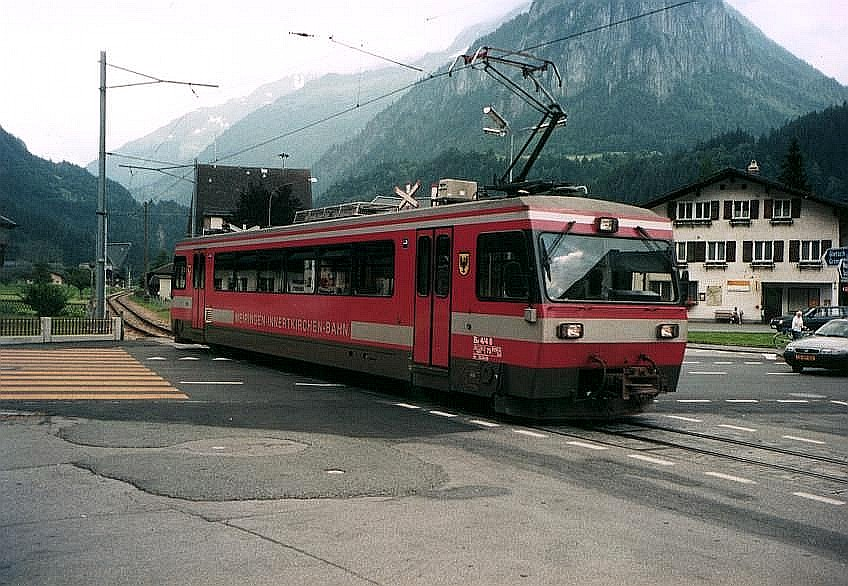
The Meiringen-Innertkirchen Bahn in Innertkirchen

Innertkirchen is the terminus of the local Meiringen–Innertkirchen railway, a metre gauge railway, which links the village with Meiringen railway station in the nearby town of Meiringen. The municipality has multiple stations on the line, including Innertkirchen Grimseltor and Innertkirchen MIB. At Meiringen, connection can be made with the Brünigbahn railway from Interlaken to Lucerne. Construction of the proposed Grimsel Tunnel would provide additional train travel to the south towards Oberwald railway station.
