= Innertkirchen MIB railway station =

Train station in Switzerland

Innertkirchen MIB
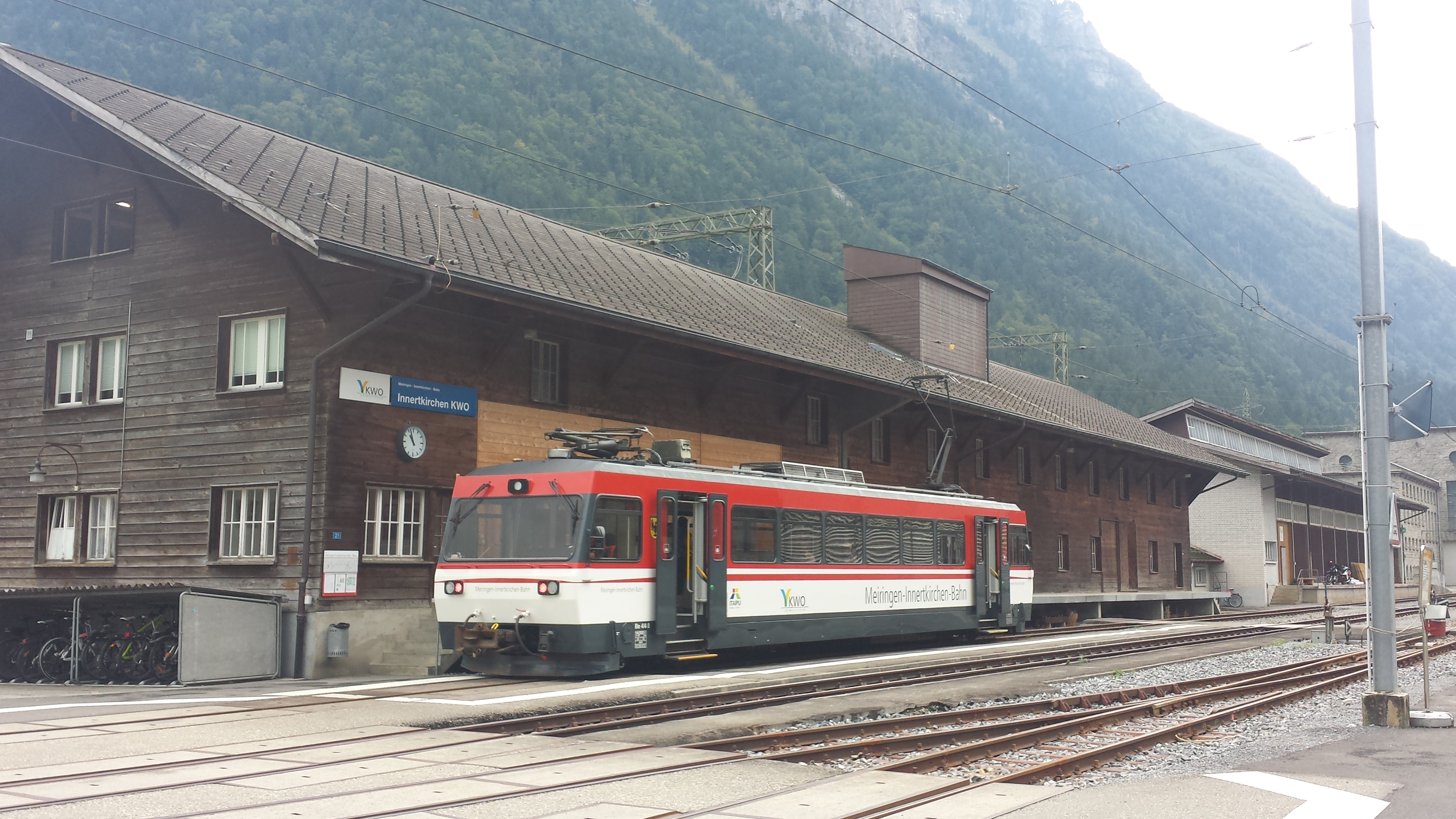
- An MIB train at the station in 2014

General information
- Location: Innertkirchen, Bern; Switzerland
- Coordinates: 46°42′08″N 8°13′57″E
- Elevation: 633 m (2,077 ft)
- Owner: Meiringen-Innertkirchen-Bahn
- Line: Meiringen–Innertkirchen line
- Distance: 5.0 km (3.1 mi) from Meiringen
- Platforms: 1 side platform
- Tracks: 1
- Train operators: Meiringen-Innertkirchen-Bahn

Other information
- Fare zone: 812 (Libero)

Services
Preceding station	Meiringen-Innertkirchen-Bahn	Following station
Innertkirchen Grimseltor towards Meiringen	Regio	Terminus
Location

Innertkirchen MIB railway station (German: Bahnhof Innertkirchen MIB), is a railway station in the municipality of Innertkirchen, in the Swiss canton of Bern. It is the eastern terminus of the 1,000 mm (3 ft 3 3/8 in) Meiringen–Innertkirchen line of the Meiringen-Innertkirchen-Bahn (MIB).

== Services ==
As of the December 2020 timetable change, the following services stop at Innertkirchen MIB:

- Regio: half-hourly service to Meiringen.
