= Meiringen railway station =

Railway station in Meiringen, Switzerland

Meiringen
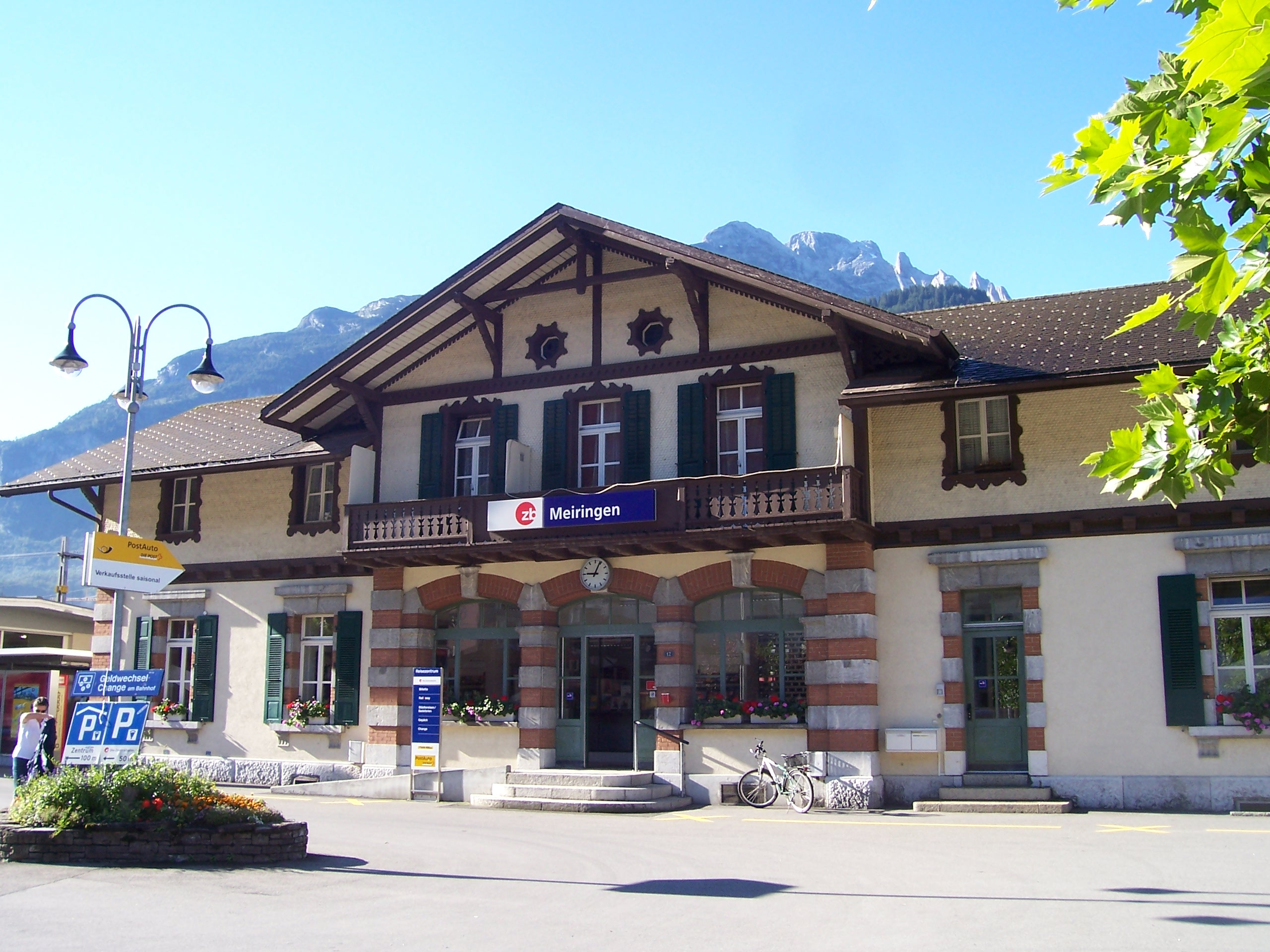
- The station building in 2007

General information
- Location: Meiringen; Switzerland
- Coordinates: 46°43′38″N 8°11′03″E
- Elevation: 595 m (1,952 ft)
- Owner: Zentralbahn (since 2005); Jura–Bern–Lucerne Railway (1888-1889), Jura–Simplon Railways (1890-1903); Swiss Federal Railways (1903-2004)
- Lines: Brünig line; Meiringen–Innertkirchen line
- Train operators: Meiringen-Innertkirchen-Bahn; Zentralbahn
- Connections: PostBus Switzerland

History
- Opened: 1888

Services
Preceding station	Zentralbahn	Following station
Brienz towards Interlaken Ost	Panorama Express Luzern-Interlaken Express	Brünig-Hasliberg towards Lucerne
Brienzwiler towards Interlaken Ost	Regio	Terminus
Preceding station	Meiringen-Innertkirchen-Bahn	Following station
Terminus	Regio	Meiringen Alpbach towards Innertkirchen MIB
Location
- Location within Switzerland Location within Canton of Bern

Meiringen railway station (German: Bahnhof Meiringen) is a railway station, in the town of Meiringen in the Swiss canton of Bern, and at the junction of two railway lines. The Brünig line of the Zentralbahn is an inter-regional metre gauge railway that links Interlaken and Lucerne, whilst the Meiringen–Innertkirchen line of the Meiringen-Innertkirchen-Bahn (MIB) is a local railway that links to Innertkirchen and the Aare Gorge.

The station is served by passenger trains of both operators, and also provides an interchange with the local bus network provided by PostBus Switzerland. One such route connects to the Reichenbach Funicular, which links the town to the Reichenbach Falls. Another route provides a service to Grindelwald over the Grosse Scheidegg Pass, using a road closed to most other traffic.

== History ==
The station was opened in 1888 by the Jura–Bern–Lucerne Railway, along with the rest of the central section of the Brünig line between Brienz and Alpnachstad stations. Initially onward journeys to Interlaken and Lucerne were accomplished by boat and the through rail route was not completed until 1916. Trains on the Brünig line were hauled by steam locomotives until the early 1940s, when the line was electrified. Ownership of the station was transferred to the Swiss Federal Railway in 1903, and to the Zentralbahn in 2004.

The Meiringen–Innertkirchen line was opened in 1926 as a construction railway for nearby hydro-electric plants, but it did not receive a licence to operate as a public passenger-carrying railway until 1946. Initially its passenger trains terminated at a separate platform just outside the main station, with only occasional freight trains crossing the level crossing into the station. The line initially used steam locomotives, subsequently assisted by battery-electric railcars, until the line was electrified in 1976.

Between 1912 and 1956, the forecourt of the station was the terminus of the Meiringen–Reichenbach–Aareschlucht tramway, an electric tramway that linked Meiringen with the Reichenbach Falls and the Aare Gorge.

== Layout ==
All trains on the Brünig line enter and leave the station at its western end, and must reverse in the station to continue their journey. Immediately to the west of the station is a junction and trains heading to Interlaken continue westwards down the valley of the Aare, whilst trains heading to Lucerne turn to the north and commence their climb to the Brünig Pass. The line up to the Brünig Pass is equipped with rack rails, and Meiringen is the furthest station from Interlaken that can be served by trains not fitted with rack equipment.

Trains on the Meiringen–Innertkirchen railway enter and leave by the station's eastern end. Although both railways are metre gauge and are physically connected, they use incompatible electrification systems. There are no through passenger trains, although freight traffic is interchanged.

The station has two west facing terminal platform tracks, numbered 1 and 2, and a third through platform track, numbered 3 for most of its length but 13 at its eastern end. Track 1 is served by a side platform adjacent to the station buildings, whilst 2 and 3 flank an island platform accessed by a concourse across the terminal end of tracks 1 and 2. Tracks 1, 2 and 3 are used by Brünig line trains, track 13 by Meiringen–Innertkirchen trains.

To the east of the station, the Meiringen–Innertkirchen railway crosses a level crossing and to the east of this is a further platform and terminal track. This was previously used by the Meiringen–Innertkirchen railway as its terminus, before a reorganisation of track and electrification systems allowed its extension into the main station.

Construction of the proposed Grimsel Tunnel would extend the railway route southwards under the Grimsel Pass to Oberwald railway station.

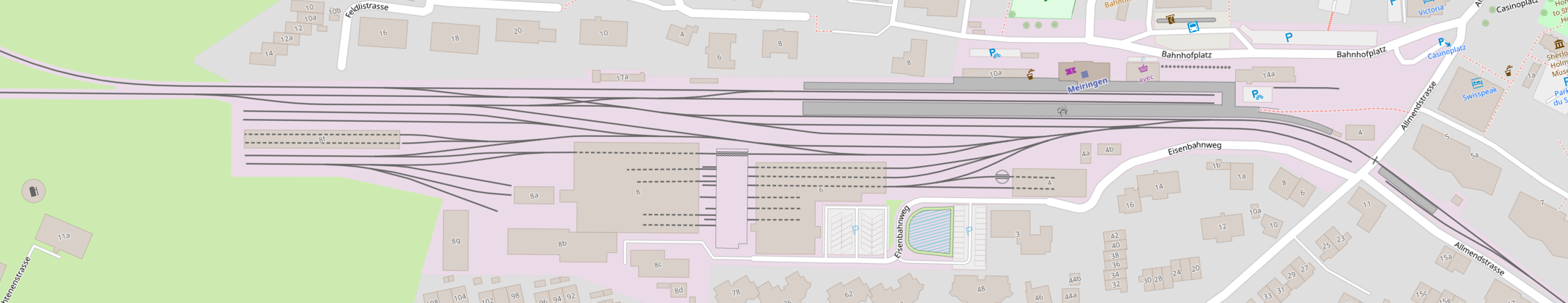
map of the station

== Services ==
The following services stop at Meiringen:

- Panorama Express Luzern-Interlaken Express: hourly service between Lucerne and Interlaken Ost.
- Regio:
  - half-hourly to hourly service to Innertkirchen MIB.
  - hourly service to Interlaken Ost.

== Gallery ==
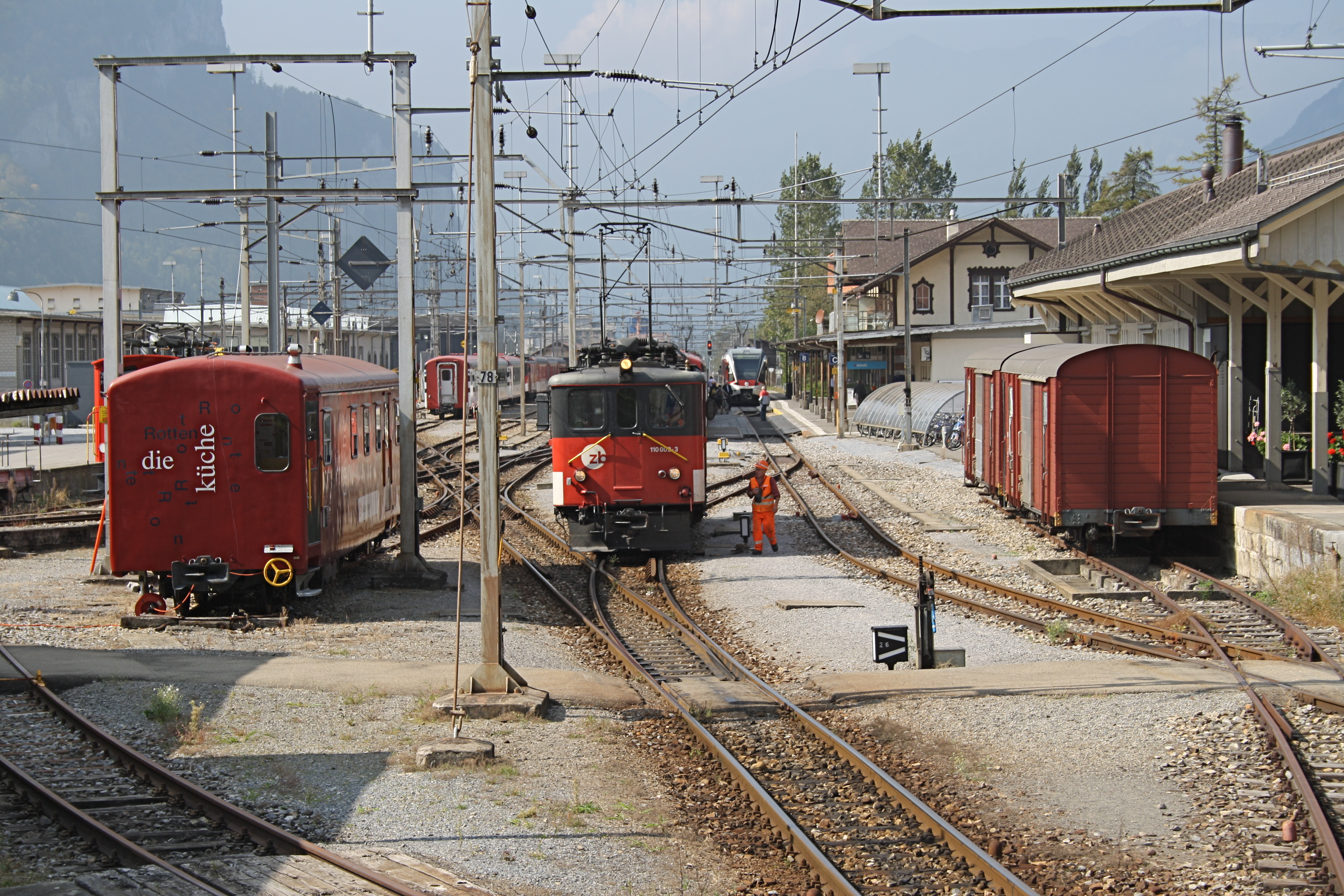
The station platforms, prior to remodelling

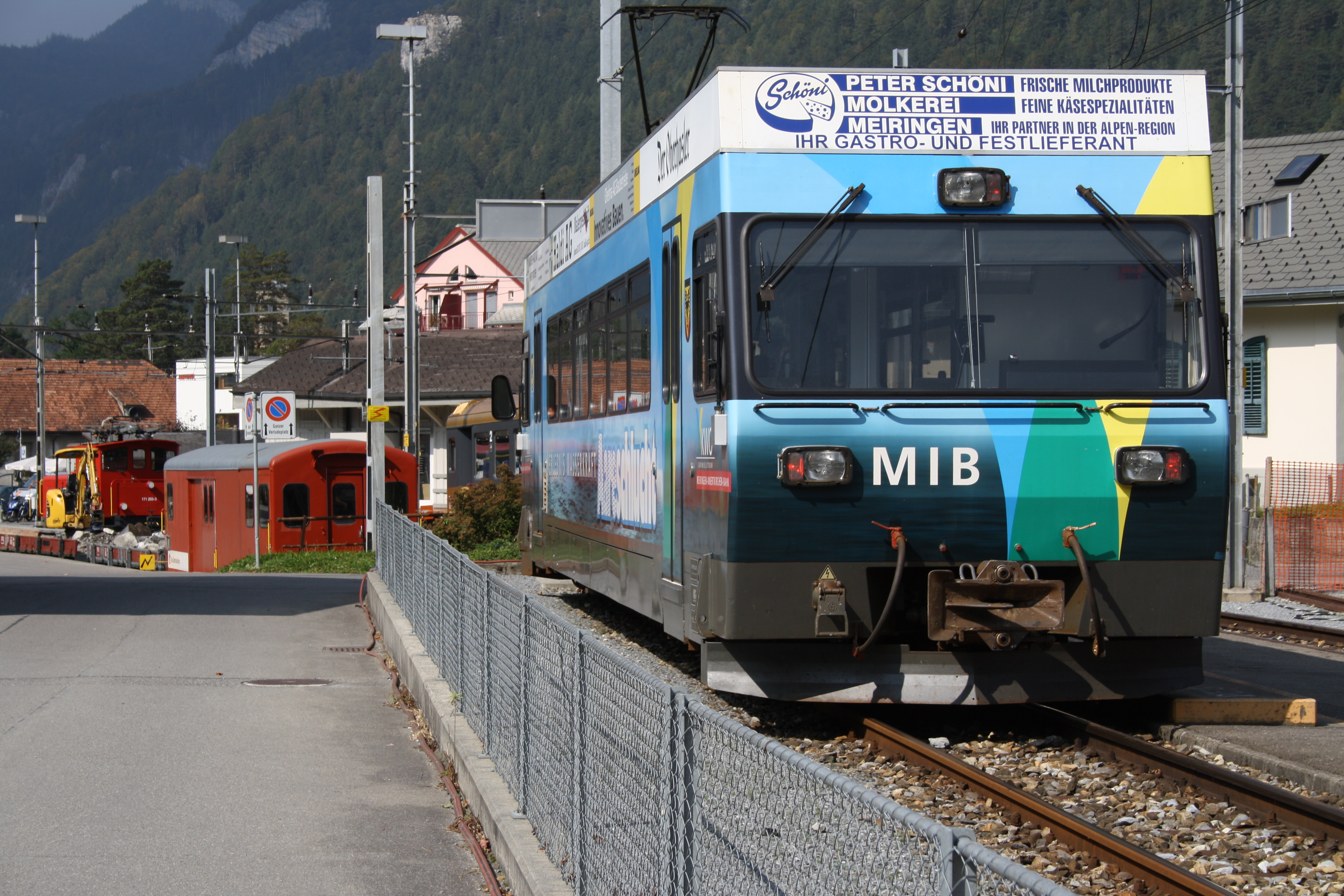
MIB railcar in its original terminal platform, before extension into the main station

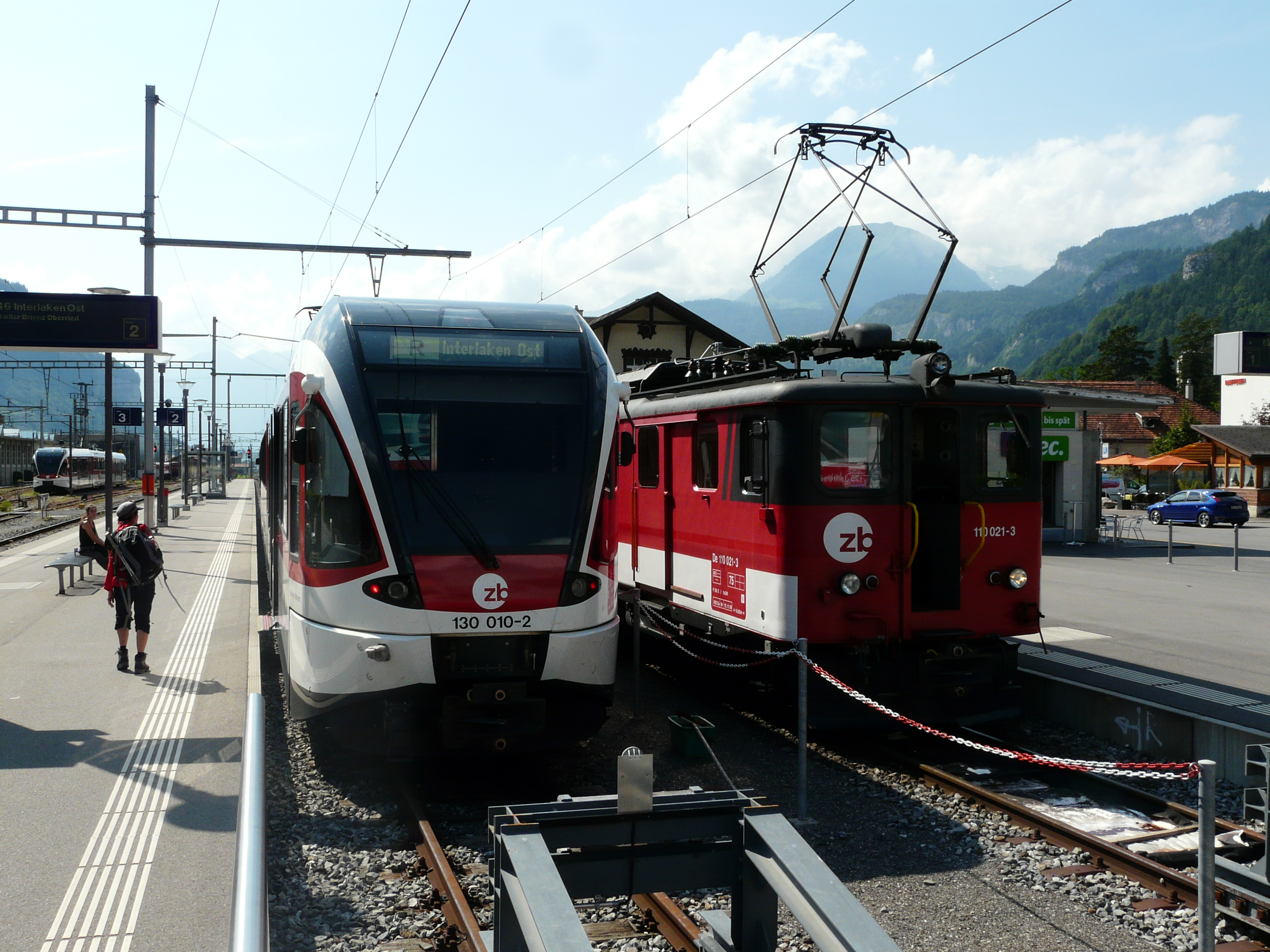
Zentralbahn trains in tracks 1 and 2, after station remodelling

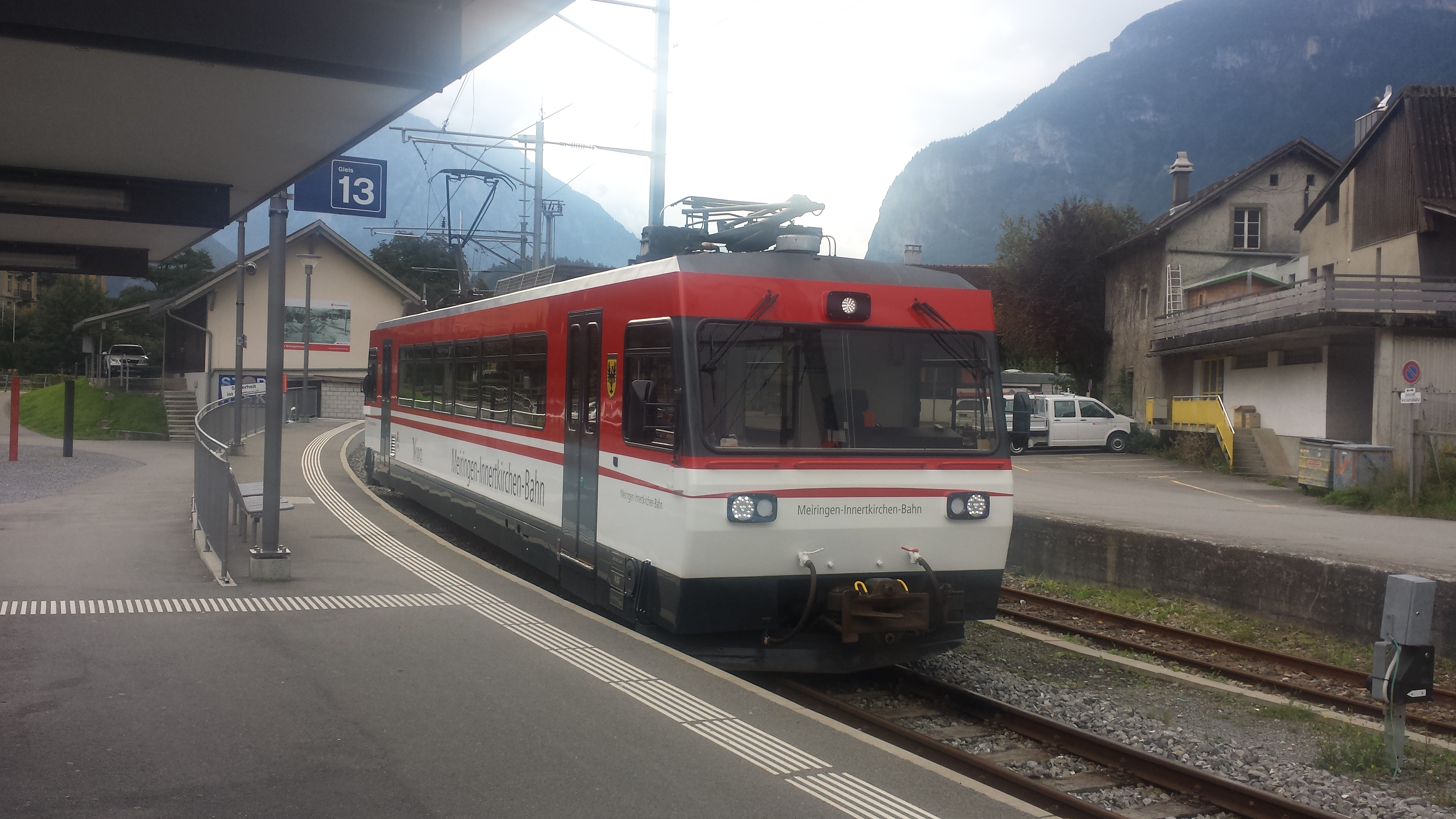
MIB railcar in its new track 13 terminus

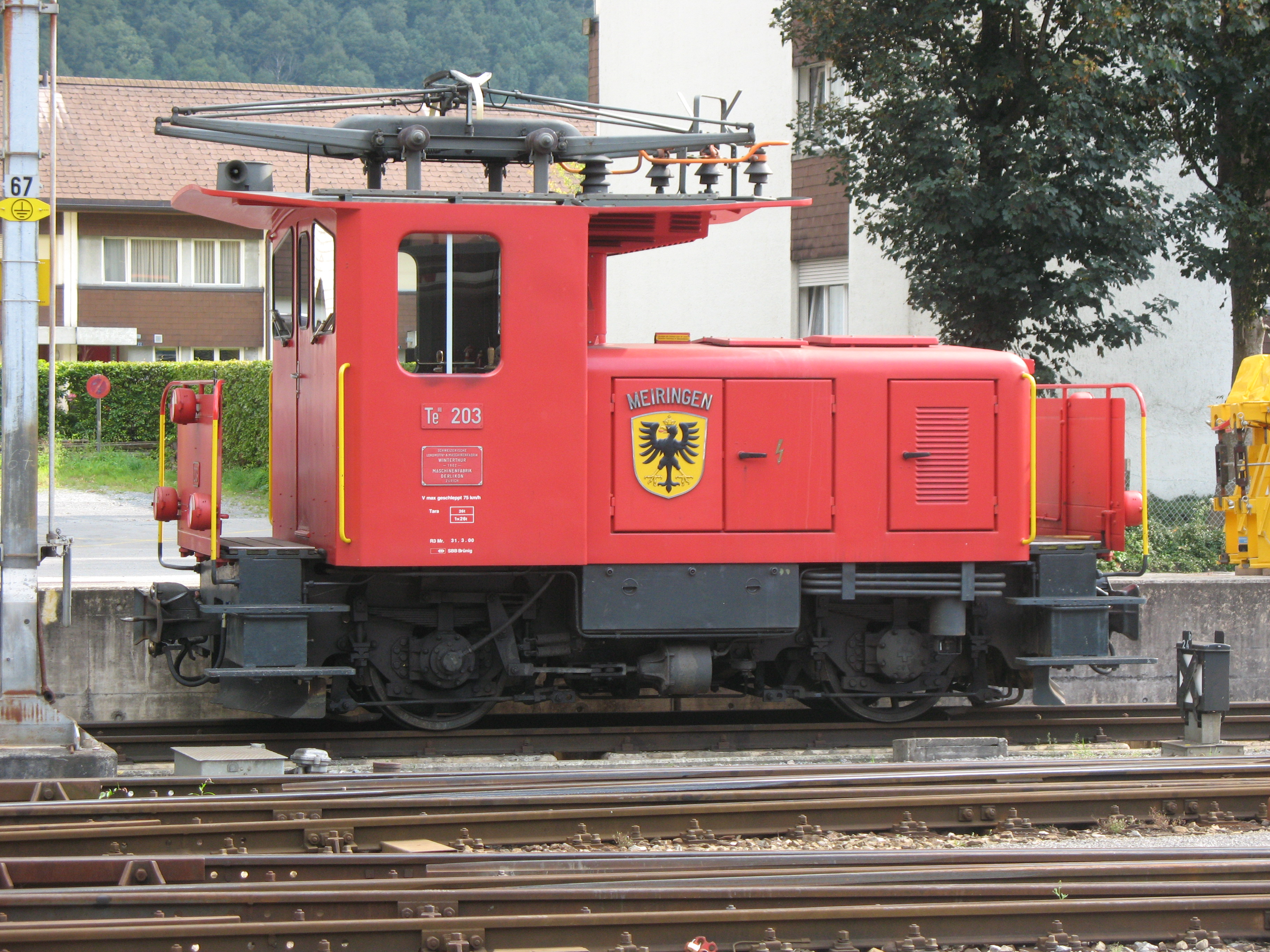
Eponymous locomotive in the station

== See also ==
- Rail transport in Switzerland
