= Meiringen–Innertkirchen railway line =

Railway line in the Swiss canton of Bern

Meiringen–Innertkirchen
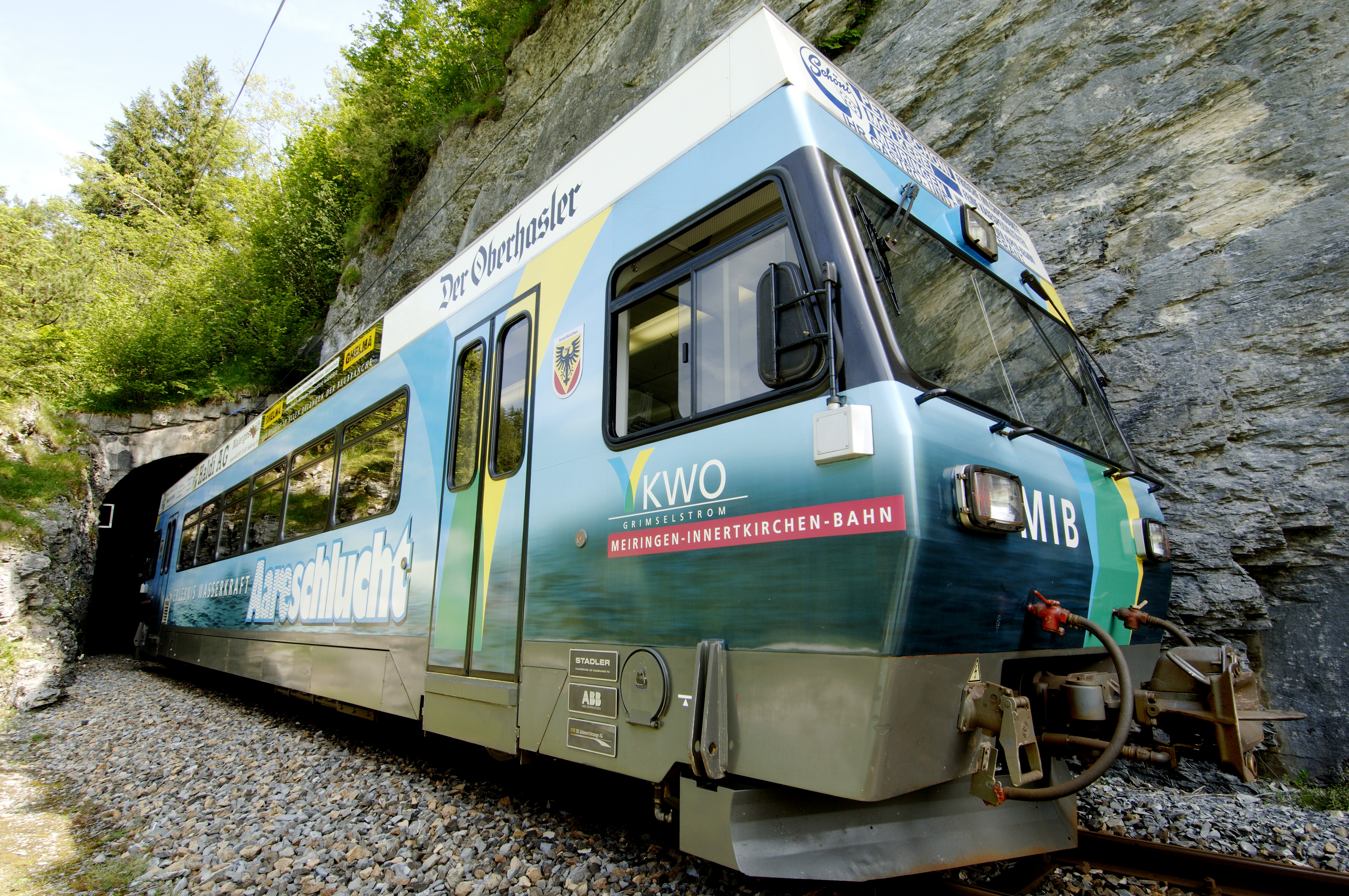
- MIB Be 4/4 8 near the Aareschlucht

Overview
- Owner: Meiringen-Innertkirchen-Bahn
- Locale: Bernese Highlands, canton of Bern, Switzerland
- Termini: Meiringen; Innertkirchen
- Stations: 7

Service
- Services: 1

History
- Opened: 1 August 1926
- Electrified: 19 November 1977

Technical
- Line length: 4.99 km (3.10 mi)
- Character: commuter and tourist railway
- Track gauge: 1,000 mm (3 ft 3 3/8 in) metre gauge
- Electrification: Overhead line, 1,200 V DC
- Highest elevation: 635 m (2,083 ft)
- Maximum incline: 20 ‰

The Meiringen–Innertkirchen railway line is a 1,000 mm (3 ft 3 3/8 in) metre gauge railway line in the Swiss canton of Bern. It covers a distance of 5 kilometres (3.1 mi) between Innertkirchen and Meiringen, where it connects with the Brünig railway line of the Zentralbahn company, which links Interlaken and Lucerne.

The Kraftwerke Oberhasli (KWO) electricity supply company built the line in 1926 to support the development of the local hydroelectricity industry. It began carrying passengers in 1946 and the KWO spun off a new company, the Meiringen-Innertkirchen-Bahn (MIB), to operate it. KWO sold the company to the Zentralbahn at the end of 2020. The line serves a local transport role, as well as transporting tourists to the scenic Aare Gorge.

== History ==
The line was originally built as a construction railway to support the building of hydroelectric dams in the Oberhasli and the Grimsel Pass. It was built by the Kraftwerke Oberhasli (KWO) company, which was founded to build and operate the hydroelectric plants, and it was opened in 1926. Several Mallet-type steam locomotives were acquired from the Rhätische Bahn to operate the line. As well as construction traffic, the line also operated a limited passenger service for workers and their families. In 1931 a battery railcar was purchased, and a second in 1939.

In 1940, a military installation was constructed in caverns, which connected to the Kirchetunnel that by-passes the Aare Gorge, as well as to the gorge itself. A train parked in the tunnel provided offices and other facilities for this installation. The caverns and connecting tunnels still exist, but are no longer used.

In 1946 the line received a licence to operate as a public passenger-carrying railway, and to this end the Meiringen-Innertkirchen-Bahn company was founded to operate the line as a subsidiary of the owners, KWO.

When the license came up for renewal in 1976, it was decided to upgrade the line drastically. The heavy, four-wheel battery railcars were harsh on the track and trackbed, and were at the end of their economic life. The line was electrified and electric streetcar-type railcars were purchased. In 1996, a new railcar was purchased to run most services. In 2005, a second-hand railcar was purchased to act as reserve, allowing the former streetcars to be scrapped.

In 2003, the underground Aareschlucht Ost stop was opened, to provide access to the eastern entrance to the Aare Gorge.

On January 1, 2021, the Zentralbahn took over the line.

== Operation ==
=== Route ===
The line begins at track 13 of Meiringen railway station, where it is physically connected to the Brünig line of the Zentralbahn company. Both lines are of 1,000 mm gauge, but are incompatible electrically, and no through passenger services are operated. Shortly after leaving the station, the line crosses a level crossing and passes the disused former passenger terminus of the line, used until passenger service was extended into the main station.

The first stop on the line is at Alpbach. This is some 500 metres (1,600 ft) walk from the lower station of the Reichenbachfall Funicular, which takes visitors up to the famous Reichenbach Falls, the site of the apparent death of Sir Arthur Conan Doyle's fictional hero, Sherlock Holmes. For many years, Alpbach was the point at with the MIB made a level crossing with the Meiringen–Reichenbach–Aareschlucht line, a tramway that existed from 1912 to 1956.

From Alpbach the line follows the north bank of the Aare river. The next stop is Aareschlucht West, just before the beginning of the scenic Aare Gorge or Aareschlucht. The line by-passes the gorge through the 1,502-metre (4,928 ft) long Kirchetunnel, which contains the underground Aareschlucht Ost stop. Both Aareschlucht stops link to the tourist walkways through the gorge itself.

After a further intermediate stop at Unterwasser, the line passes through the middle of Innertkirchen village, calling at the Innertkirchen Post stop, before ending at the KWO plant in Innertkirchen. Beyond the passenger terminus, the line continues into the KWO's workshops, where the line's workshops are also found.

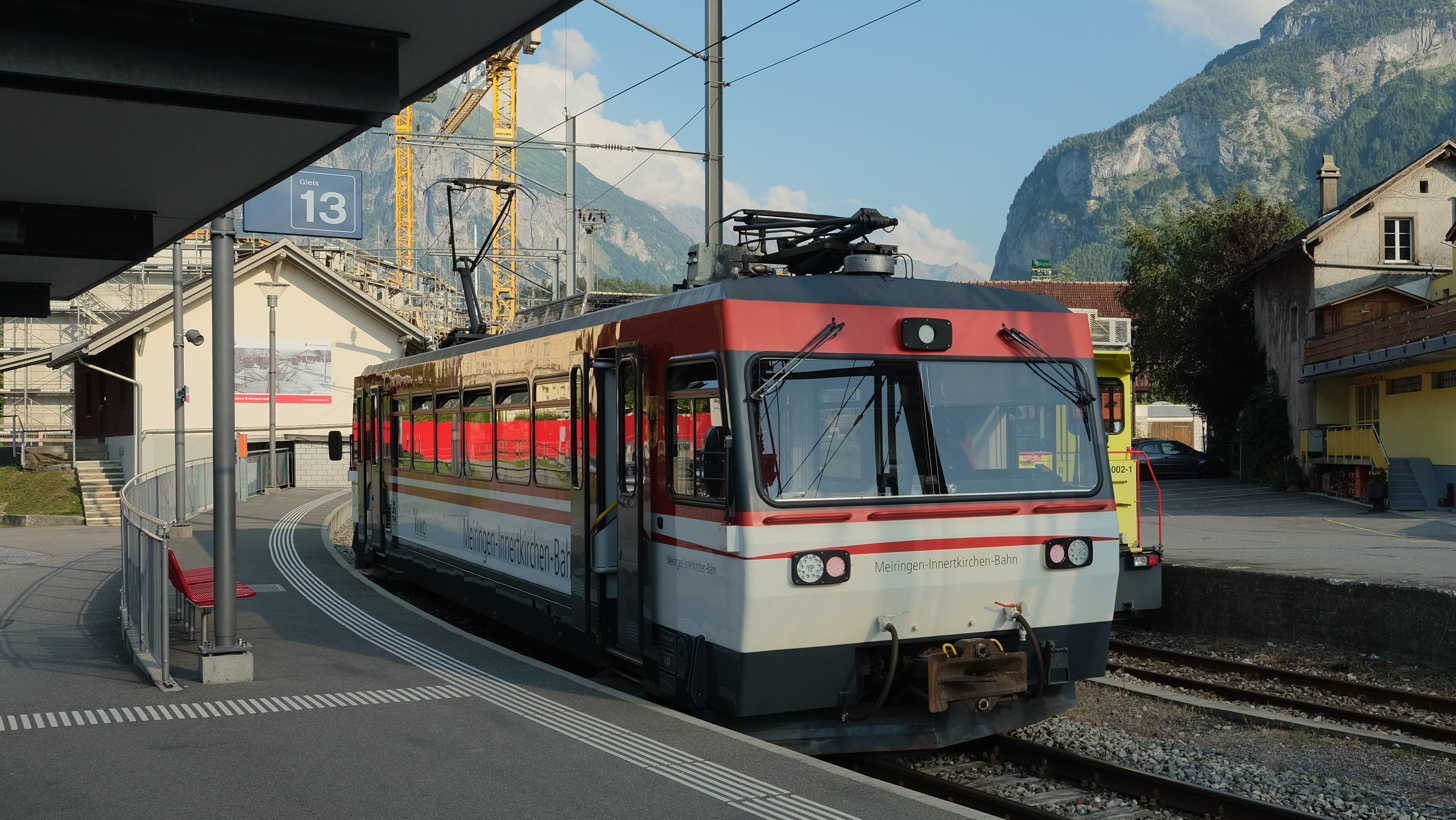
The MIB terminus on track 13 at Meiringen railway station

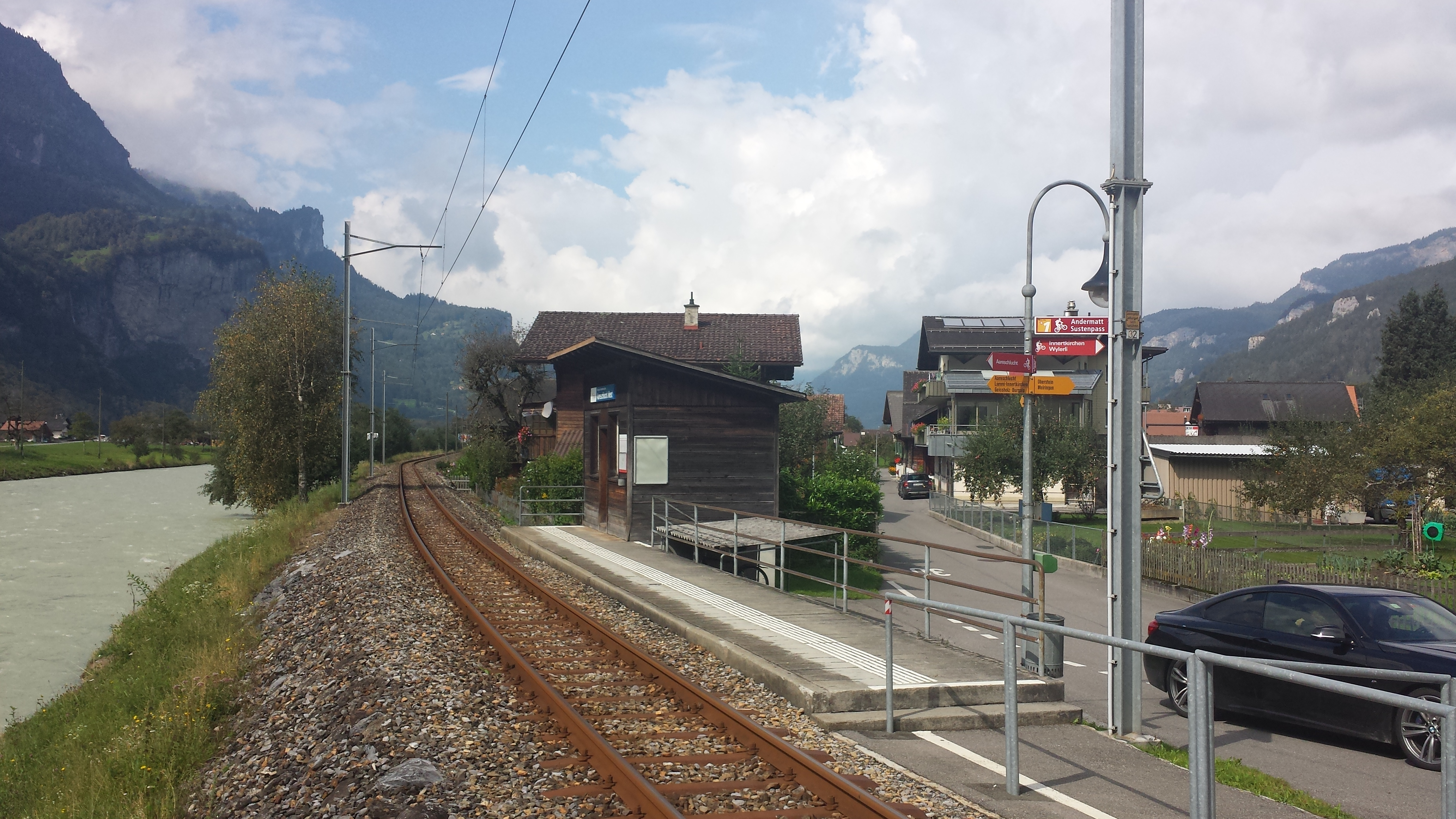
Aareschlucht West station, typical of the line's intermediate stops

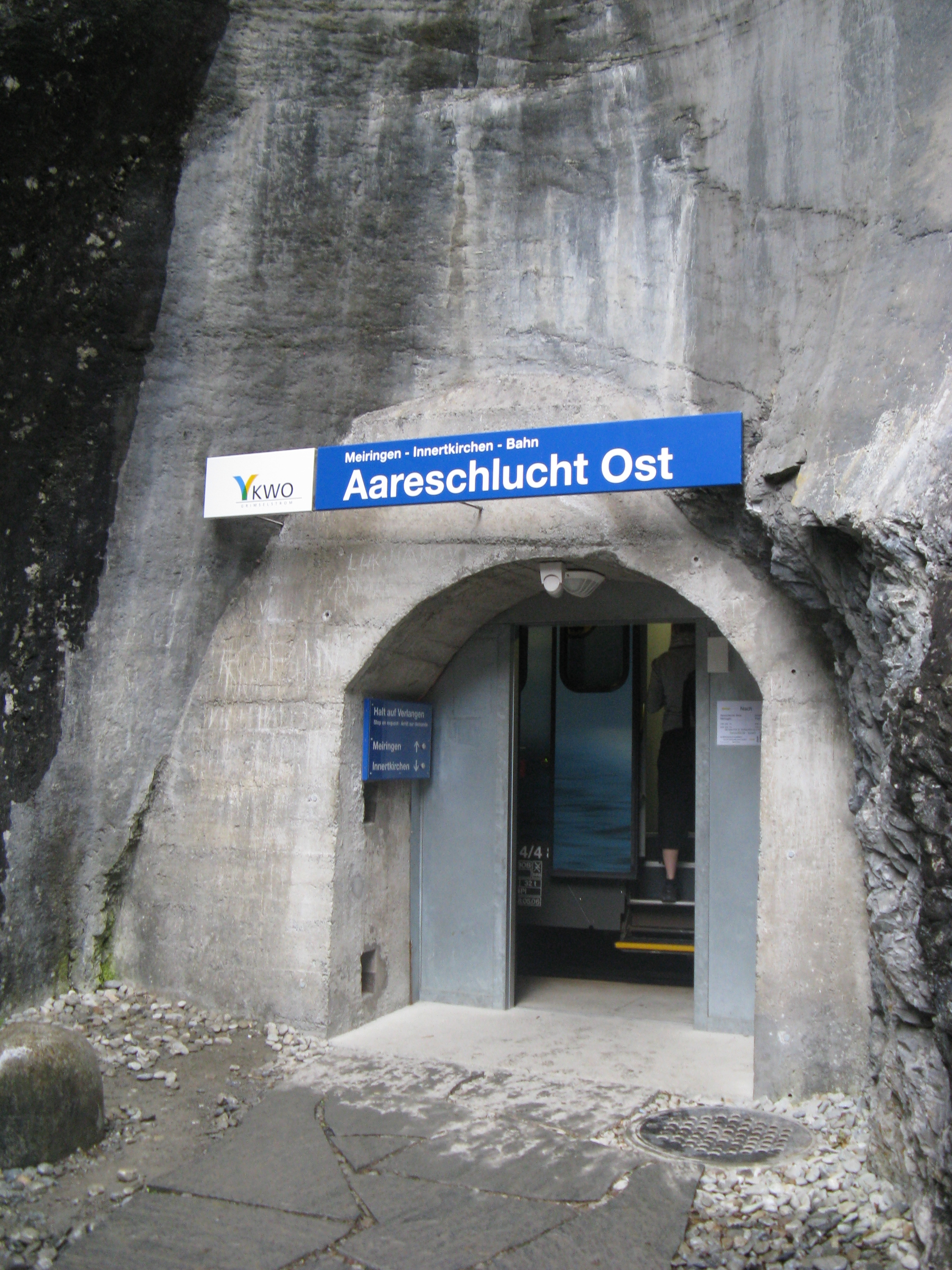
The unusual Aareschlucht Ost station

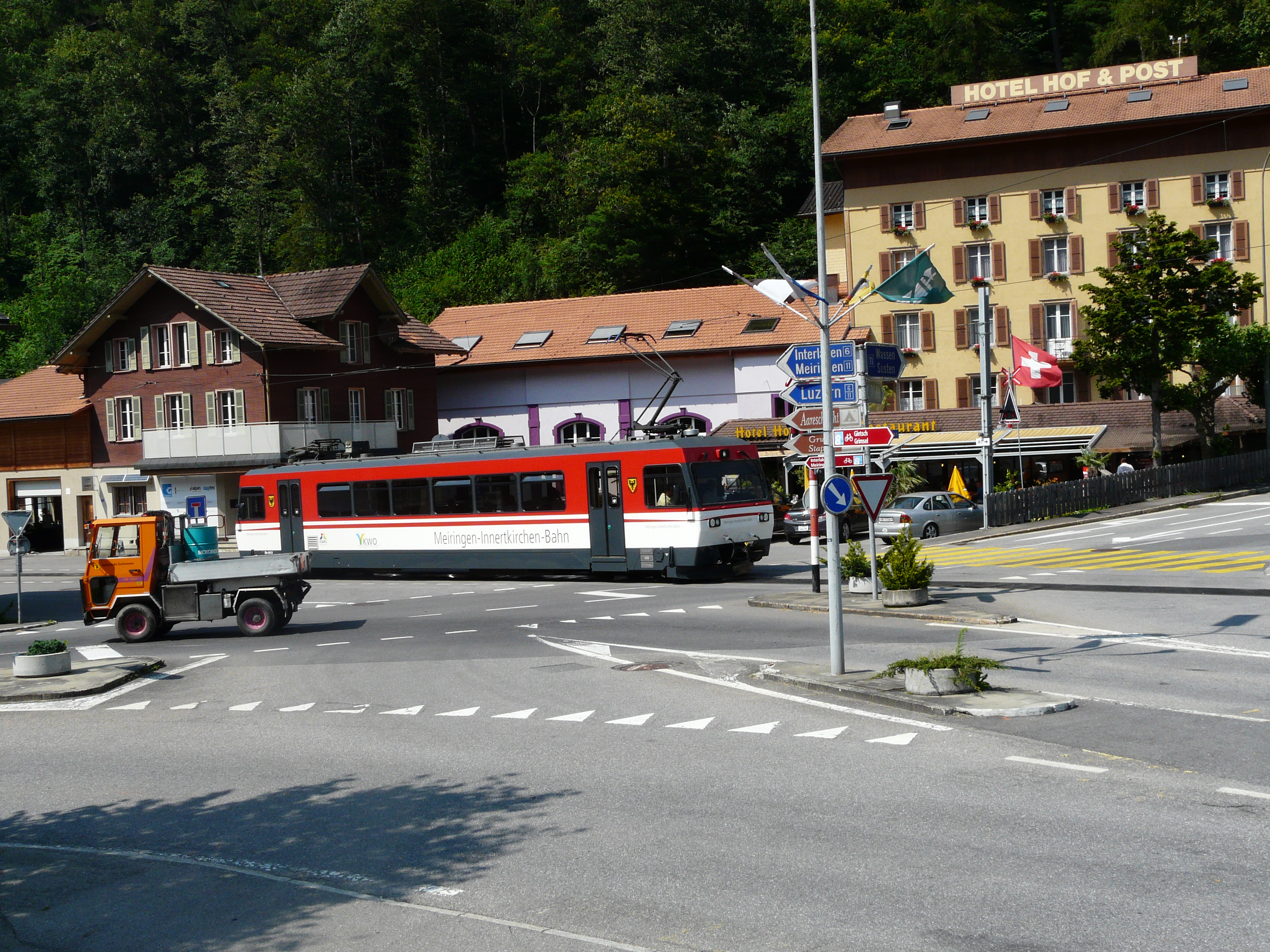
MIB car passes through centre of Innertkirchen at Innertkirchen Post

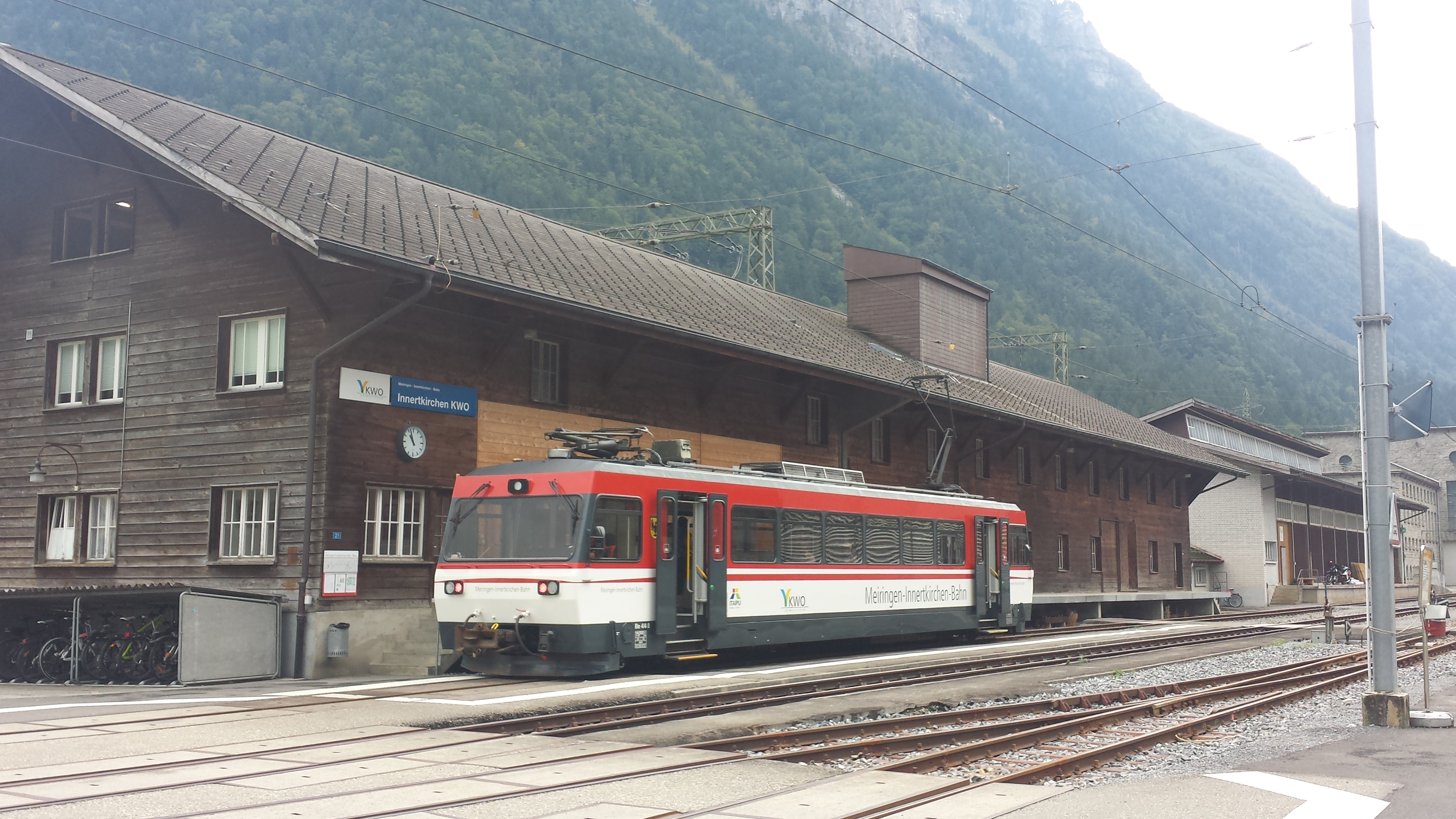
Railcar by the KWO's workshops at Innertkirchen terminus

=== Services ===
Passenger services are operated once or twice per hour, seven days a week, with connections into and out of most trains on the Brunig line. Trains comprise a single railcar.

The operation of the Aareschlucht Ost stop is particularly notable, as the train stops within the tunnel, with its front door adjacent to a door in the side of the tunnel that opens out through the side of the gorge. The tunnel door is opened by the train driver only once the train has come to a halt. The stop is a request stop, and passengers wishing to board a train must press a button outside the tunnel door to request the train to stop.

Freight traffic is run as demand warrants, largely carrying spare parts arriving via the Brünigbahn for the power stations.

== Rolling stock ==
=== Current rolling stock ===
Image	Numbers	Notation	Year	Notes
	8	Be 4/4	1996	New railcar built by Stadler Rail.
	11	BDe 4/4	1953	Ex Chemins de fer du Jura 604. Bought and rebuilt in 2005 as reserve railcar used when 8 is not available.
	12	Gem 4/4	1952	Ex Chemins de fer du Jura 402. Rebuilt from De 4/4, with the addition of a diesel engine. Operational in 2011.

=== Former rolling stock ===
Image	Numbers	Notation	Year	Notes
	3	Ba 2/2	1931	Battery railcar with 12 seats. Taken out of service in 1979 and sold to the Deutscher Eisenbahn-Verein at Bruchhausen-Vilsen where it is numbered T46.
	4-5	CFa 2/2	1939, 1949	Battery railcars with 22 seats. Number 4 was put on display at the Verkehrshaus Luzern in 1982. Number 5 is on display outside the MIB's Innertkirchen workshops.
	6-7	Bem 4/4	1952	Ex Oberrheinische Eisenbahn railcars 63, 65 and 68. Bought and rebuilt in 1977. Railcar 6 was broken up in 1999 and railcar 7 was broken up in around 2001.
	9	Be 4/4	1961	Ex Regionalverkehr Bern-Solothurn Be 4/4 74. Bought in 1997 for use as reserve railcar used when 8 is not available, replaced by 11 in 2005. Plans to restore it as a historic vehicle for RBS failed in 2007 due to the high cost of asbestos removal.
	10	Tm II	1959	Ex Brünigbahn Tm II 980. With La Traction since 2011.
