= Reichenbachtal =

Alpine valley in Oberhasli, canton of Bern, Switzerland

Coordinates: 46.6799°N 8.1494°E

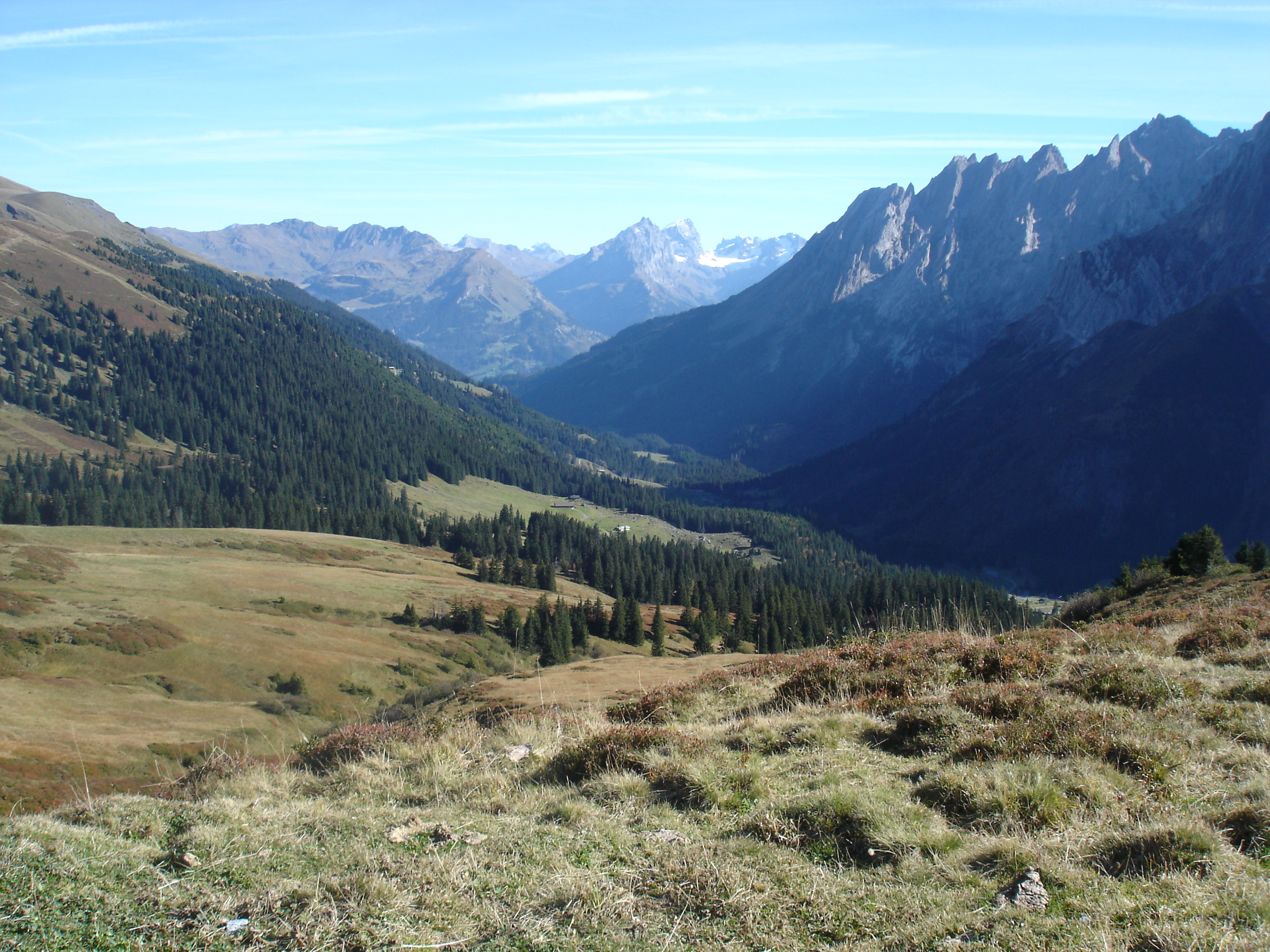
Reichenbachtal seen from the Grosse Scheidegg Pass, with a view of the Engelhörner

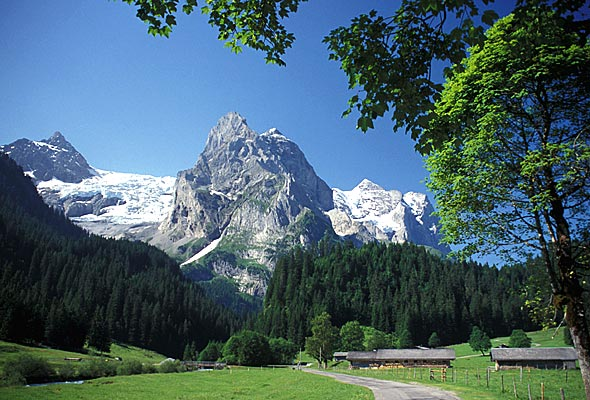
Reichenbachtal at Rosenlaui, with a view of Wetterhorn and Rosenlaui Glacier

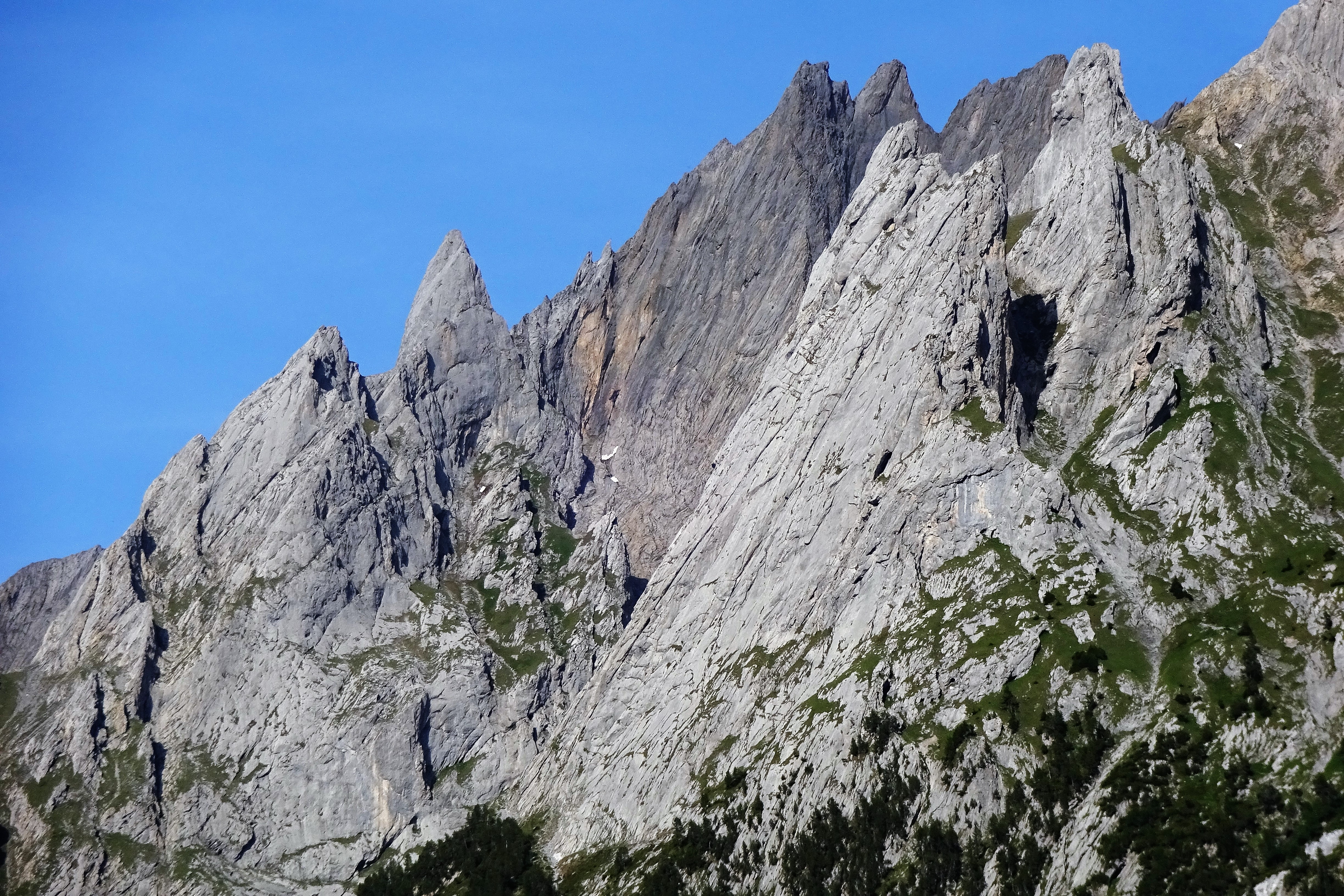
Klein & Gross Simelistock, Engelhörner-Mittelgruppe & Engelhörner-Westgruppe – Tannenspitze, Rosenlauistock & Sattelspitzen

Reichenbachtal is an Alpine valley in Oberhasli, canton of Bern, Switzerland. It is situated within the municipality of Schattenhalb, connecting Meiringen with the Grosse Scheidegg pass towards Grindelwald. Its water, the Rychenbach, forms the Reichenbach Fall before joining the Aare at Meiringen.

Rosenlaui is the highest settlement in the valley, situated approximately halfway up, at 1,328 m above sea level. The valley is also known as Rosenlauital after the settlement. Rosenlaui hotel is among the oldest in the region, bearing testimony to the early boom of tourism in Switzerland in the mid 19th century.

On the eastern side of the valley rise the Wetterhorn (3,692 m), the Engelhörner (2,782 m), the Wellhorn (3,191 m), besides the Rosenlaui Glacier. Also east of the valley is the Rosenlouwi Gorge, a deep and narrow gorge formed by the meltwater of the Rosenlaui Glacier, accessible by a 500 m footpath.

Further up the valley lies Schwarzwaldalp, marking the end of the public section of the road over the pass of the Grosse Scheidegg. The road beyond is, however, used by a PostBus Switzerland service over the pass to Grindelwald. Bus services operate between May and October, with four or more buses a day depending on time of year.
