= Schattenhalb =

- Municipality
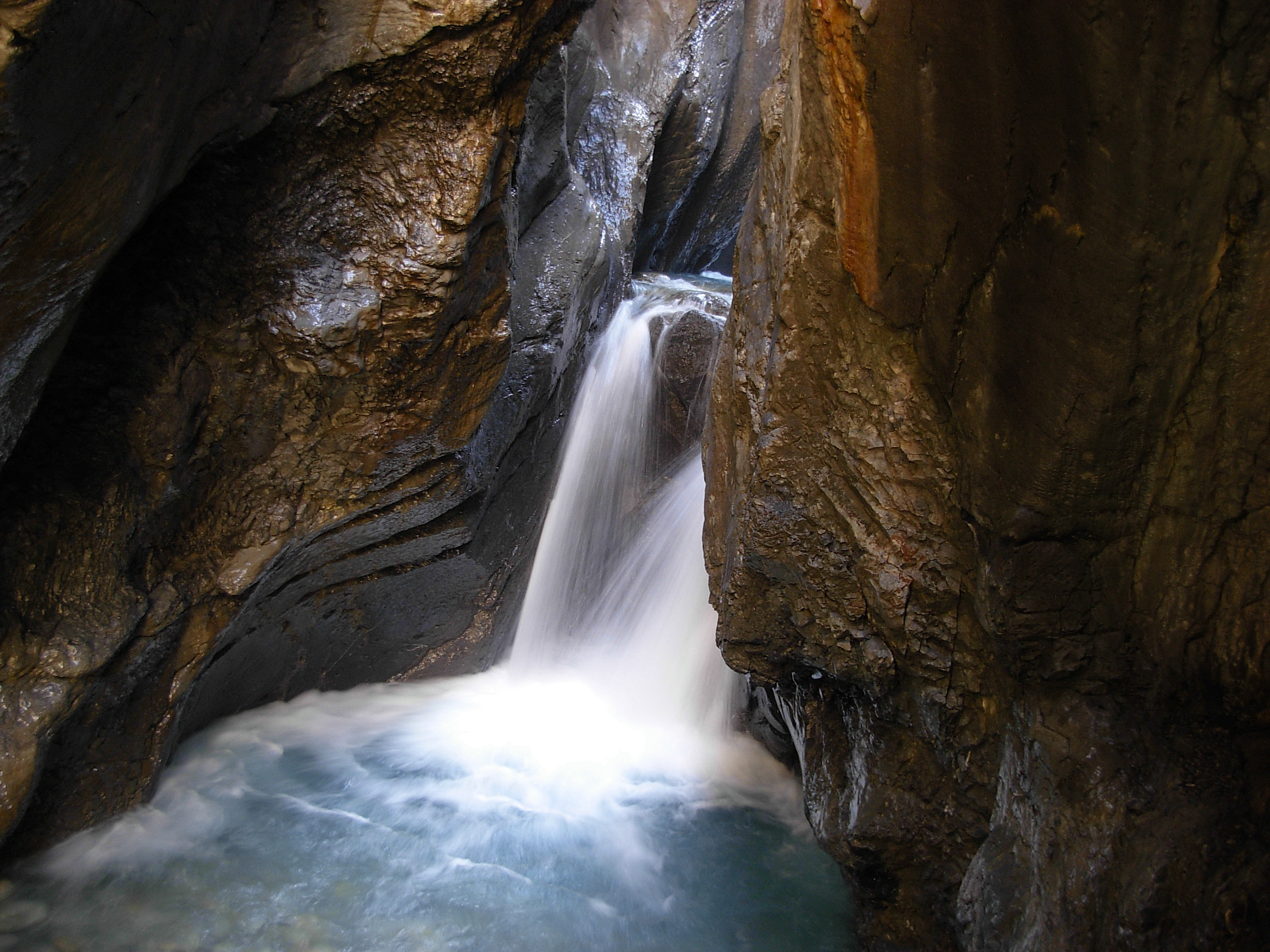
- Waterfall in Rosenlaui canyon near Schattenhalb

- Flag Coat of arms
- Location of Schattenhalb
- Location within Switzerland Location within Canton of Bern
- Coordinates: 46°43′N 8°11′E
- Country: Switzerland
- Canton: Bern
- District: Interlaken-Oberhasli

Government
  - Executive: Gemeinderat with 5 members
  - Mayor: Gemeindepräsident(in); Hannes Kohler (as of 2026)

Area
  - Total: 31.5 km^{2} (12.2 sq mi)
- Elevation (Willigen im Tal village): 600 m (2,000 ft)

Population (December 2020)
  - Total: 552
  - Density: 17.5/km^{2} (45.4/sq mi)
- Time zone: UTC+01:00 (CET)
  - Summer (DST): UTC+02:00 (CEST)
- Postal code: 3860
- SFOS number: 786
- ISO 3166 code: CH-BE
- Localities: Falchern, Geissholz, Lugen, Schwendi, Willigen
- Surrounded by: Meiringen, Innertkirchen and Grindelwald
- Website: https://www.schattenhalb.ch

Schattenhalb is a municipality in the Interlaken-Oberhasli administrative district in the canton of Bern in Switzerland. The municipality includes the settlements of Willigen, Geissholz, Falcheren and Lüögen.

== History ==
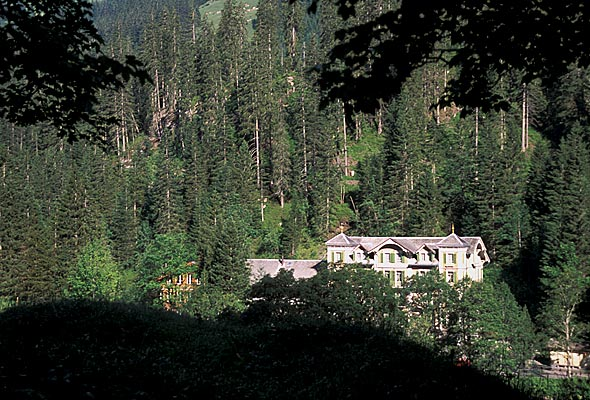
Spa-hotel Rosenlaui

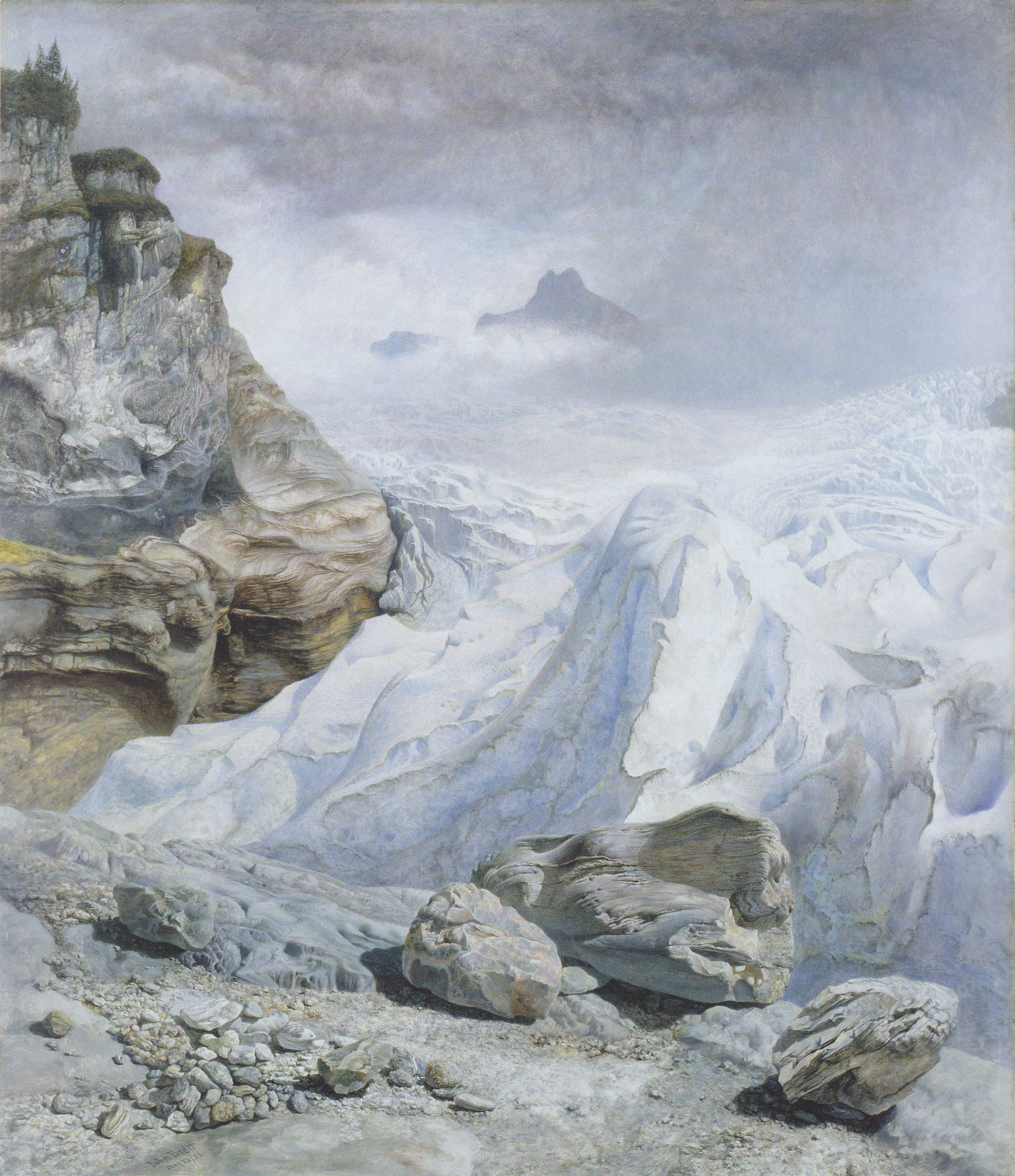
1856 painting, "The glacier of Rosenlaui" by John Brett (1831–1902)

The municipality was created in 1834 from the cooperative farms (Bäuerten) of "Willigen," "Geissholz," "Falchern" and "Lugen." The name Schattenhalb ("Shadow-half") refers to the shady face of the mountainside south of Meiringen.

The oldest traces of settlements in the area are scattered Bronze Age ax and spear heads and a Roman era coin hoard. By the Middle Ages the scattered Bäuerten of Schattenhalb were part of the parish of Meiringen and the Vogtei of Hasli. In 1334 the entire Vogtei was acquired by the city of Bern.

Traditionally the villagers raised cattle and horses in seasonal alpine meadows and then sold the livestock and cheese to traders. During the 18th and 19th century authors, such as Charles Victor de Bonstetten and Jakob Samuel Wyttenbach, explored and described the natural beauty of the canyons, waterfalls and glaciers of the Bernese Oberland including many sights near Schattenhalb. Tourists began to visit the area and explore the land around the municipality. In 1788 the Rosenlauibad (Rosenlaui baths or pools) opened and by the 19th century a hotel and spa developed at the Rosenlaui river. A spa opened along the Reichenbach river before 1800 followed by a hotel in 1835. A cable car was built in 1899 which allowed guests to travel to the top of the falls. Reichenbach hotel burned in 1901 and was rebuilt as a larger, luxury hotel. However, it was converted into a psychiatric hospital in 1919. The nearby Aare gorge became a tourist destination in 1888. Between 1912 and 1956 a tram connected Meiringen, Schattnehalb and the Aare gorge. Today the municipality shares a post office and telephone exchange with Meiringen. While some residents still are involved in agriculture, about three-fourths of the jobs in Schattenhalb are in the services sector.

A village school opened in Falchern in 1659, followed by one in Willigen in 1714 and Geissholz in 1788. The schools in Falchern and Geissholz closed in 1970 and 2004 respectively, leaving the Willigen school as the only primary school in the municipality.

== Geography ==
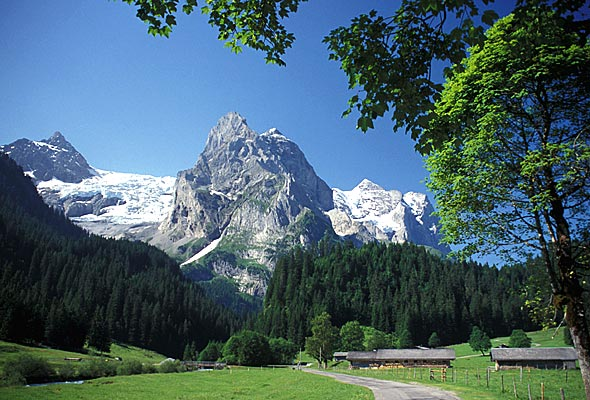
Rosenlaui glacier and the Reichenbachtal in Schattenhalb

Schattenhalb has an area of 31.54 km^{2} (12.18 sq mi). As of 2012, a total of 8.38 km^{2} (3.24 mi^{2}) or 26.6% is used for agricultural purposes, while 12.38 km^{2} (4.78 mi^{2}) or 39.3% is forested. The rest of the municipality is 0.69 km^{2} (0.27 mi^{2}) or 2.2% is settled (buildings or roads), 0.39 km^{2} (0.15 mi^{2}) or 1.2% is either rivers or lakes and 9.64 km^{2} (3.72 mi^{2}) or 30.6% is unproductive land.

During the same year, housing and buildings made up 1.0% and transportation infrastructure made up 0.9%. A total of 33.8% of the total land area is heavily forested and 2.3% is covered with orchards or small clusters of trees. Of the agricultural land, 6.2% is pasturage and 20.3% is used for alpine pastures. All the water in the municipality is flowing water. Of the unproductive areas, 6.5% is unproductive vegetation, 21.3% is too rocky for vegetation and 2.8% of the land is covered by glaciers.

Schattenhalb lies in the Bernese Oberland in the Hasli valley, where the Aare River flows. It includes the villages of Willigen im Tal at an elevation of about 600 m (2,000 ft), Geissholz am Kirchet (786 m [2,579 ft]) and Falchern, Schwendi and Lugen on a terrace above the valley at an elevation of about 850 m (2,790 ft). The highest mountain is the Wellhorn, on the southwestern edge of the municipality (3,192 m [10,472 ft]).

Part of the municipality is covered by the Rosenlaui Glacier. At a lower altitude is the Rosenlaui gorge, a tourist attraction, which can be reached from the Hasli valley via the Reichenbachtal valley. At the lower end of this valley are the famous Reichenbach Falls.

On 31 December 2009 Amtsbezirk Oberhasli, the municipality's former district, was dissolved. On the following day, 1 January 2010, it joined the newly created Verwaltungskreis Interlaken-Oberhasli.

== Coat of arms ==
The blazon of the municipal coat of arms is Per chevron Sable Five Mullets Or three and two and of the second an Eagle of the first crowned of the second.

== Demographics ==
Schattenhalb has a population (as of December 2020) of 552. As of 2011, 12.0% of the population are resident foreign nationals. Over the last year (2010-2011) the population has changed at a rate of -2.5%. Migration accounted for -0.8%, while births and deaths accounted for -0.3%.

Most of the population (as of 2000) speaks German (607 or 92.8%) as their first language, Spanish is the second most common (19 or 2.9%) and Portuguese is the third (9 or 1.4%). There are 2 people who speak French and 4 people who speak Italian.

As of 2008, the population was 50.5% male and 49.5% female. The population was made up of 261 Swiss men (44.1% of the population) and 38 (6.4%) non-Swiss men. There were 251 Swiss women (42.4%) and 42 (7.1%) non-Swiss women. Of the population in the municipality, 271 or about 41.4% were born in Schattenhalb and lived there in 2000. There were 184 or 28.1% who were born in the same canton, while 75 or 11.5% were born somewhere else in Switzerland, and 73 or 11.2% were born outside of Switzerland.

As of 2011, children and teenagers (0–19 years old) make up 21.8% of the population, while adults (20–64 years old) make up 56.2% and seniors (over 64 years old) make up 22%.

As of 2000, there were 270 people who were single and never married in the municipality. There were 304 married individuals, 51 widows or widowers and 29 individuals who are divorced.

As of 2010, there were 80 households that consist of only one person and 27 households with five or more people. In 2000, a total of 237 apartments (83.2% of the total) were permanently occupied, while 28 apartments (9.8%) were seasonally occupied and 20 apartments (7.0%) were empty. The vacancy rate for the municipality, in 2010, was 0.3%. In 2011, single family homes made up 51.1% of the total housing in the municipality.

The historical population is given in the following chart:

== Politics ==
In the 2011 federal election the most popular party was the Swiss People's Party (SVP) which received 45.5% of the vote. The next three most popular parties were the Conservative Democratic Party (BDP) (24.9%), the Social Democratic Party (SP) (10.7%) and the Green Party (8.3%). In the federal election, a total of 198 votes were cast, and the voter turnout was 46.4%.

== Economy ==
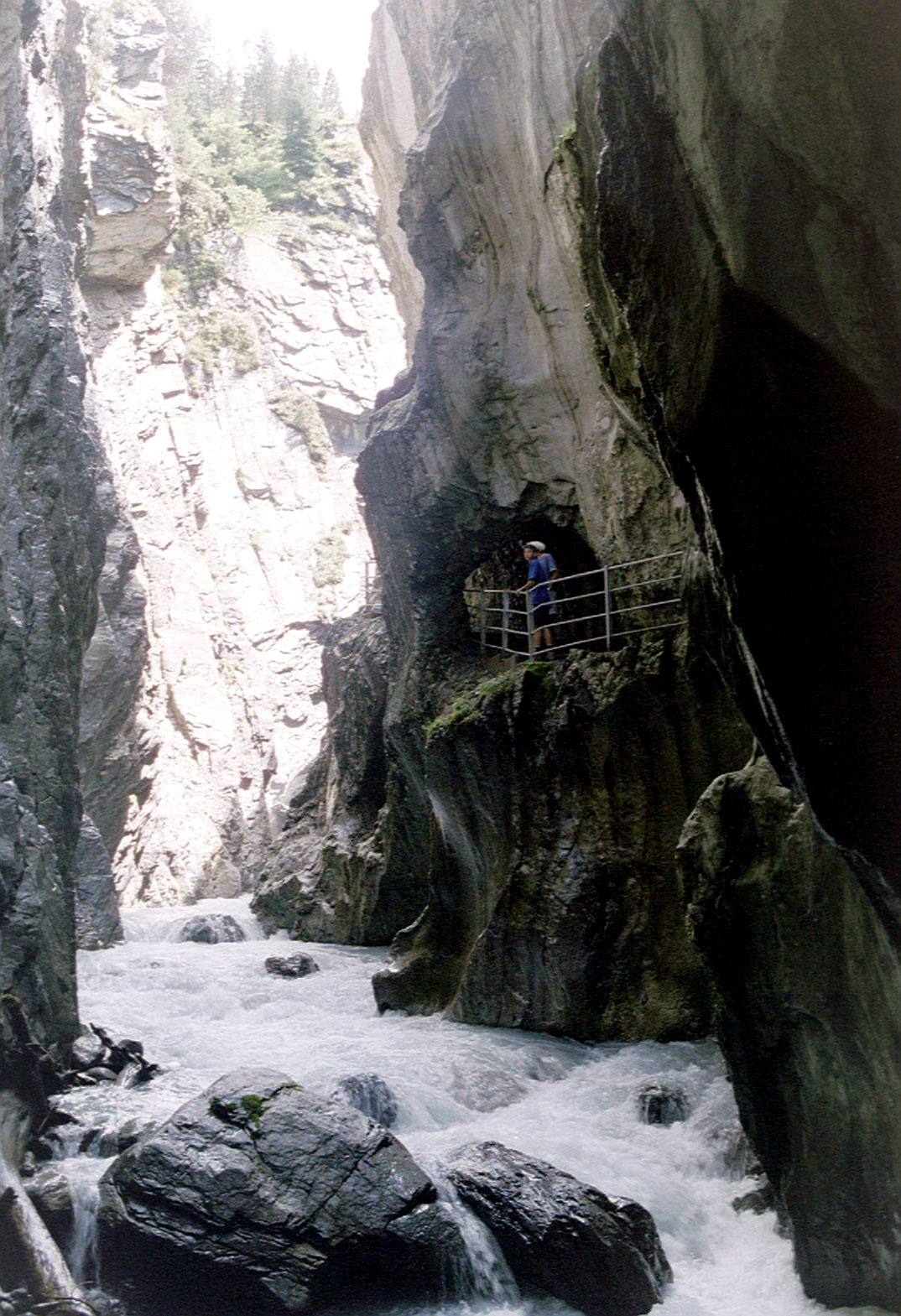
Tourism to the many natural wonders, such as the Rosenlaui gorge, is a major part of the local economy

As of 2011, Schattenhalb had an unemployment rate of 0.74%. As of 2008, there were a total of 624 people employed in the municipality. Of these, there were 48 people employed in the primary economic sector and about 21 businesses involved in this sector. 89 people were employed in the secondary sector and there were 6 businesses in this sector. 487 people were employed in the tertiary sector, with 14 businesses in this sector. There were 330 residents of the municipality who were employed in some capacity, of which females made up 41.8% of the workforce.

In 2008 there were a total of 488 full-time equivalent jobs. The number of jobs in the primary sector was 28, all of which were in agriculture. The number of jobs in the secondary sector was 81 of which 11 or (13.6%) were in manufacturing and 43 (53.1%) were in construction. The number of jobs in the tertiary sector was 379. In the tertiary sector; 4 or 1.1% were in wholesale or retail sales or the repair of motor vehicles, 49 or 12.9% were in a hotel or restaurant, 5 or 1.3% were technical professionals or scientists, 5 or 1.3% were in education and 301 or 79.4% were in health care.

In 2000, there were 81 workers who commuted into the municipality and 237 workers who commuted away. The municipality is a net exporter of workers, with about 2.9 workers leaving the municipality for every one entering. A total of 93 workers (53.4% of the 174 total workers in the municipality) both lived and worked in Schattenhalb. Of the working population, 4.2% used public transportation to get to work, and 49.7% used a private car.

In 2011 the average local and cantonal tax rate on a married resident, with two children, of Schattenhalb making 150,000 CHF was 13.4%, while an unmarried resident's rate was 19.6%. For comparison, the average rate for the entire canton in the same year, was 14.2% and 22.0%, while the nationwide average was 12.3% and 21.1% respectively.

In 2009 there were a total of 249 tax payers in the municipality. Of that total, 68 made over 75,000 CHF per year. There were 2 people who made between 15,000 and 20,000 per year. The greatest number of workers, 72, made between 50,000 and 75,000 CHF per year. The average income of the over 75,000 CHF group in Schattenhalb was 101,716 CHF, while the average across all of Switzerland was 130,478 CHF.

In 2011 a total of 1.7% of the population received direct financial assistance from the government.

== Religion ==
From the 2000 census, 501 or 76.6% belonged to the Swiss Reformed Church, while 105 or 16.1% were Roman Catholic. Of the rest of the population, there were 3 members of an Orthodox church (or about 0.46% of the population), and there were 4 individuals (or about 0.61% of the population) who belonged to another Christian church. There were 6 (or about 0.92% of the population) who were Muslim. There were 2 individuals who were Buddhist. 27 (or about 4.13% of the population) belonged to no church, are agnostic or atheist, and 6 individuals (or about 0.92% of the population) did not answer the question.

== Education ==
In Schattenhalb about 57.3% of the population have completed non-mandatory upper secondary education, and 11% have completed additional higher education (either university or a Fachhochschule). Of the 44 who had completed some form of tertiary schooling listed in the census, 65.9% were Swiss men, 20.5% were Swiss women.

The Canton of Bern school system provides one year of non-obligatory Kindergarten, followed by six years of Primary school. This is followed by three years of obligatory lower Secondary school where the students are separated according to ability and aptitude. Following the lower Secondary students may attend additional schooling or they may enter an apprenticeship.

During the 2011-12 school year, there were a total of 42 students attending classes in Schattenhalb. There were no kindergarten classes in the municipality. The municipality had 3 primary classes and 42 students. Of the primary students, 9.5% were permanent or temporary residents of Switzerland (not citizens) and 11.9% have a different mother language than the classroom language.

As of 2000, there were a total of 20 students attending any school in the municipality. Of those, 18 both lived and attended school in the municipality, while 2 students came from another municipality. During the same year, 50 residents attended schools outside the municipality.
