= Adolphe Braun =

French photographer

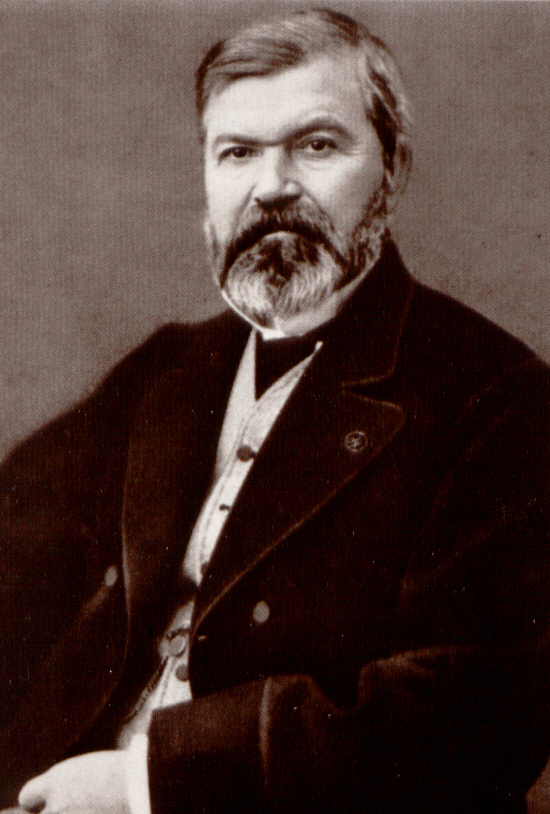
- Adolphe Braun, c. 1860
- Born: Jean Adolphe Braun; 13 June 1812; Besançon, First French Empire
- Died: 31 December 1877 (aged 65); Dornach district, Mülhausen, Alsace-Lorraine, German Empire
- Occupations: Photographer, decorative designer
- Spouses: Louis Marie Danet (m. 1834; died 1843) Pauline Baumann (m. 1843)
- Children: 5

Jean Adolphe Braun (13 June 1812 – 31 December 1877) was a French photographer, best known for his floral still lifes, Parisian street scenes, and grand Alpine landscapes.

One of the most influential French photographers of the 19th century, he used contemporary innovations in photographic reproduction to market his photographs worldwide.

In his later years, he used photographic techniques to reproduce famous works of art, which helped advance the field of art history.

== Life ==
Braun was born in Besançon in 1812, the eldest child of Samuel Braun (1785–1877), a police officer, and Marie Antoinette Regard (born 1795). When he was about 10, his family relocated to Mulhouse, a textile manufacturing center in the Alsace region along the Franco-German border. He showed promise as a draftsman, and was sent to Paris in 1828 to study decorative design. In 1834, he married Louis Marie Danet, who he had three children with: Marie, Henri, and Louise. That same year, Adolphe, alongside his brother Charles, opened the first of several unsuccessful design partnerships.

After several unsuccessful design ventures in the 1830s, he published a successful collection of floral designs in 1842. Upon the premature death of his wife 1843, Braun sold his Paris studio and moved back to Mulhouse, where he became chief designer in the studio of Dollfus-Ausset, which provided patterns for textiles. He remarried to Pauline Melanie Petronille Baumann (1816–1885) on 12 December 1843 and had two more children with her; son Paul Gaston and daughter Marguerite.

In 1847, he opened his own studio in Dornach, a suburb of Mulhouse.

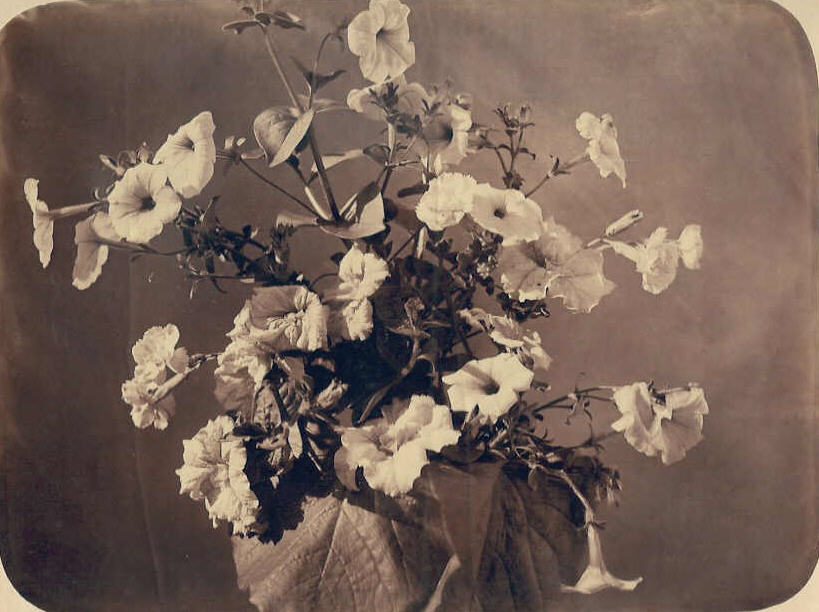
One of Braun's early Flower studies (1855)

In the early 1850s, Braun began photographing flowers to aid in the design of new floral patterns. Making use of the recently developed collodion process, which allowed for print reproduction of the glass plates, he published over 300 of his photographs in an album, Fleurs photographiées, in 1855. These photographs caught the attention of the Paris art community, and Braun produced a second set for display at the Paris Universal Exposition that same year.

In 1857, Braun formed a photography company, Braun et Cie, and with the help of his sons, Henri and Gaston, and several employees, set about taking photographs of the Alsatian countryside. These were published in 1859 in L’Alsace photographiée, and several were displayed at the 1859 Salon.

By the 1860s, the Braun et Cie studio was operating in a factory-like manner, producing all of its own materials except paper. The studio created thousands of stereoscopic images of the Alpine regions of France, Germany, Switzerland, and Italy. Braun also produced a number of large-format panoramic images of the Alpine countryside, using the pantoscopic camera developed by English inventors John Johnson and John Harrison.

In the mid-1860s, Braun invested in a new carbon print method developed by English chemist Joseph Wilson Swan. In 1867, Braun used the new carbon method to create a series of large-format hunting scenes entitled, Panoplies de gibier. He also used the new carbon print method to produce photographs of well-known works of art at places such as the Louvre, the Vatican, and the Albertina, as well as various sculptures in France and Italy. This endeavor proved successful, and Braun focused primarily on art reproductions for the remainder of his career. After his death in 1877, his son, Gaston, continued operating Braun et Cie into the 20th century.

== Work ==
=== Photographs ===
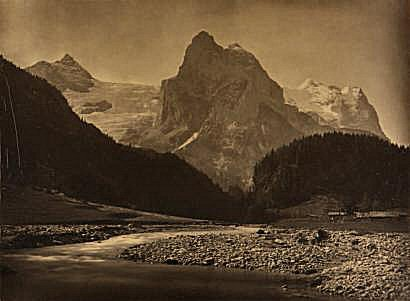
Wellhorn and the Rosenlaui Glacier, photographed by Braun circa 1860

Photography historian Naomi Rosenblum described Braun's work as representative of the relationship between art and commercialism in the mid-19th century. His self-sustaining Mulhouse studio helped elevate photography from a craft to a full-scale business enterprise, producing thousands of unique images which were reproduced and marketed throughout Europe and North America. Rosenblum also suggests that Braun's detailed reproductions of works of art in European museums brought these works to art students in North America, providing a major catalyst for the field of art history in the United States.

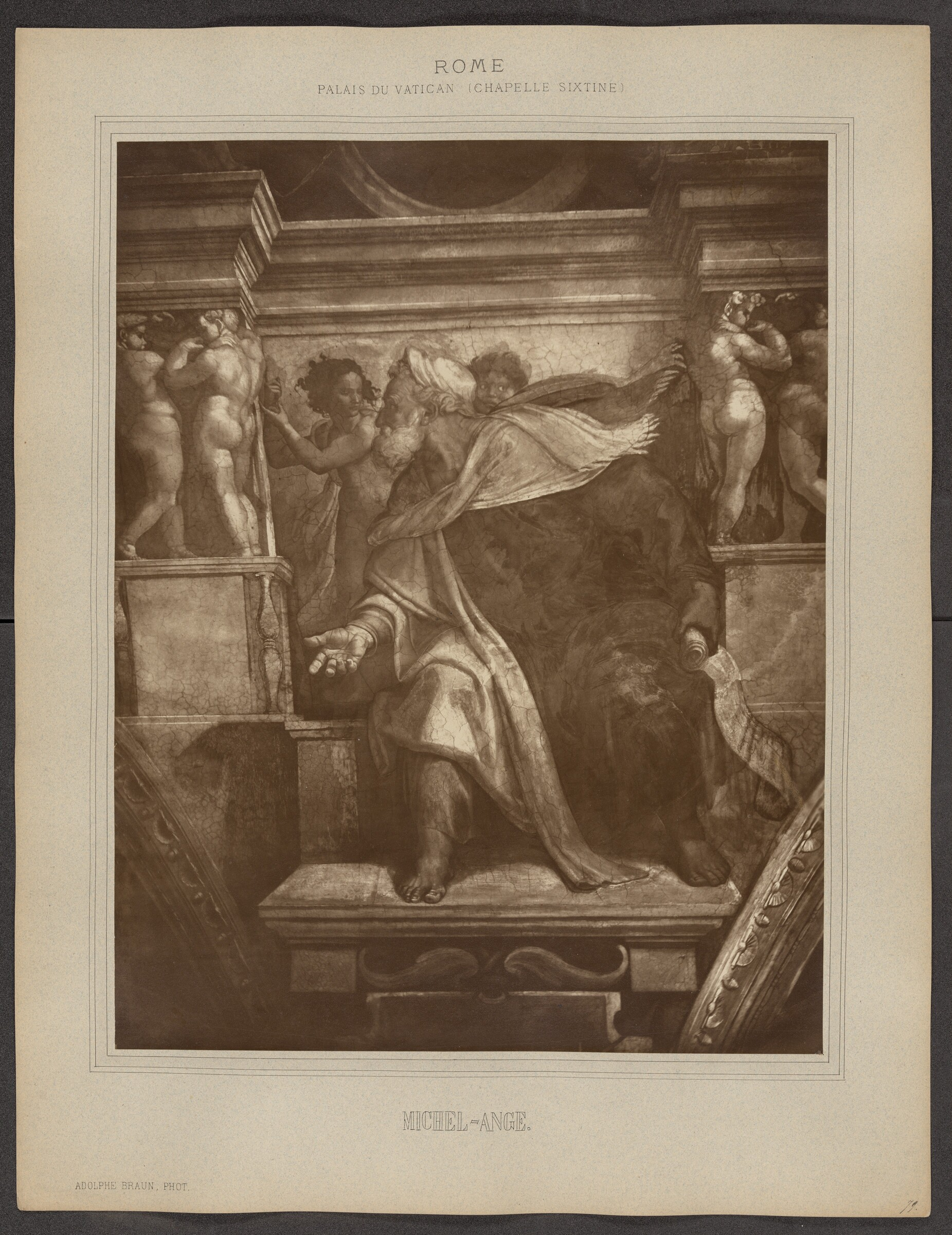
Adolphe Braun, Ezekiel from the Sistine Ceiling by Michelangelo, Department of Image Collections, National Gallery of Art Library, Washington, DC

Braun's son Henri trained as a painter, but changed careers to lead his father's art documentary campaigns. Between 1867 and 1870 he organized work in Italy, particularly at the Vatican, including the first photo-documentation of the Sistine Chapel frescoes.

Braun's early photographs were primarily of flowers, originally taken to complement his work as a pattern designer. Subsequent photographs focused on Alpine landscapes, especially lake scenes, and glacier scenes. Unlike many landscape photographers during this period, Braun liked to include people in his scenes. Photography historian Helmut Gernsheim suggested that Braun was one of the most skillful photographers of his era in rendering composition. While not known as a portraitist, he did take portraits of several notable individuals, including Pope Pius IX, Franz Liszt, and the Countess of Castiglione, mistress of Napoleon III.

Braun's work has been exhibited at the Metropolitan Museum of Art, the J. Paul Getty Museum, the George Eastman House, and the Musée d'Orsay. His photographs of Parisian street scenes and Alpine landscapes are frequently reproduced in works on the history of photography.

=== Albums ===
- Fleurs photographiées (1855)
- L’Alsace photographiée (1859)
- Vues d'Alsace (1860)
- Costumes de Suisse (1869)

== Gallery ==
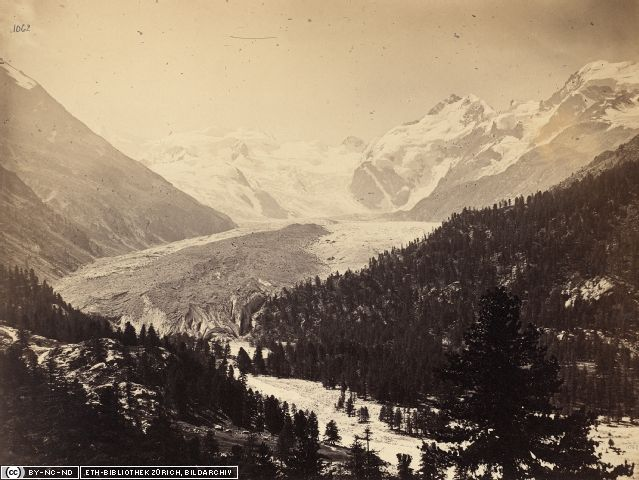
Morteratsch Glacier (1867)

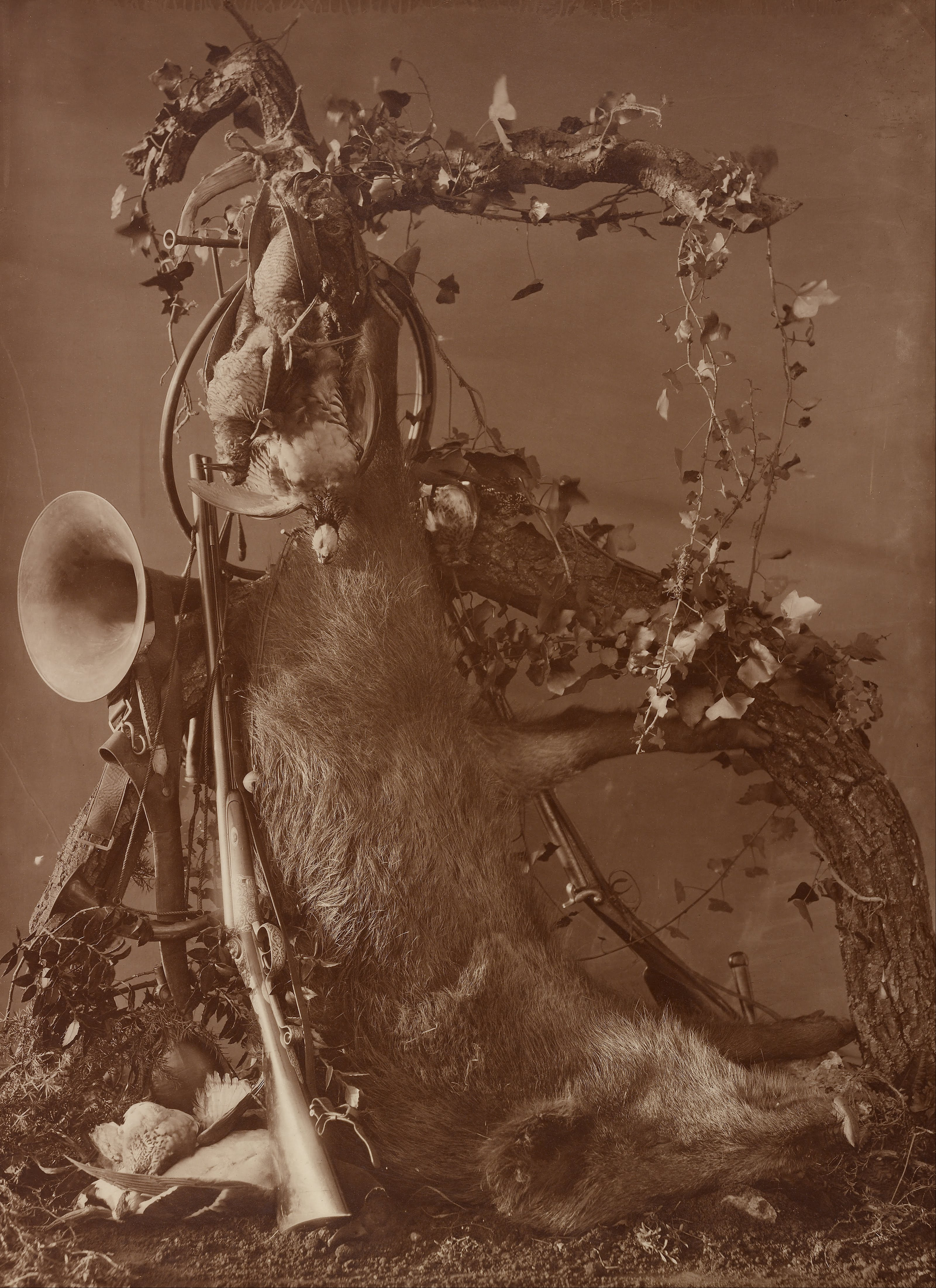
Still Life of a Hunting Scene (1867)

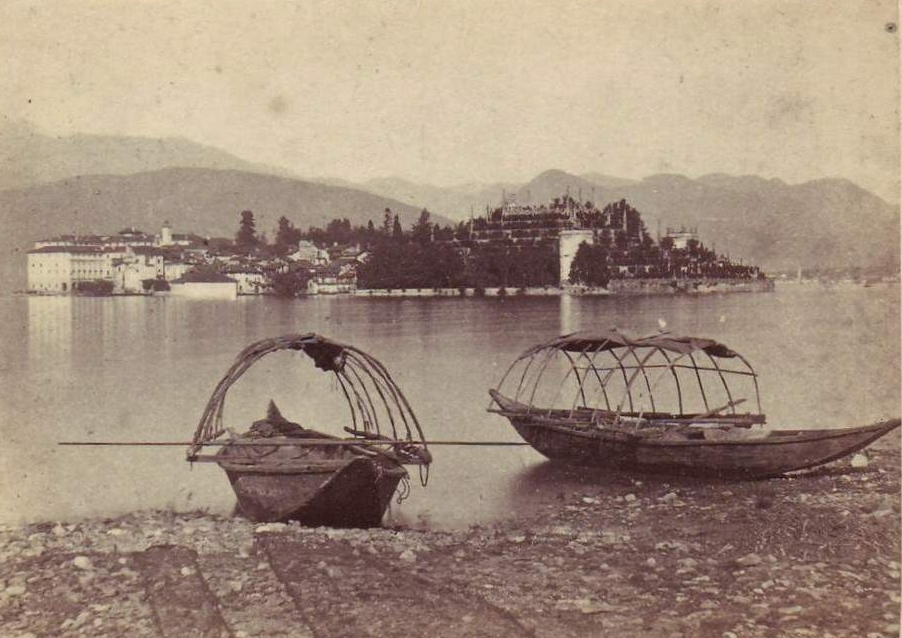
Lake Maggiore, Isola Bella (1860s)

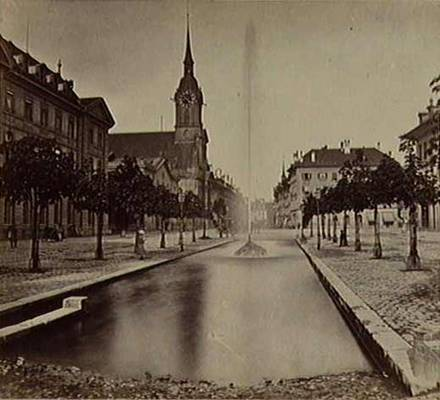
Berne (circa 1870)

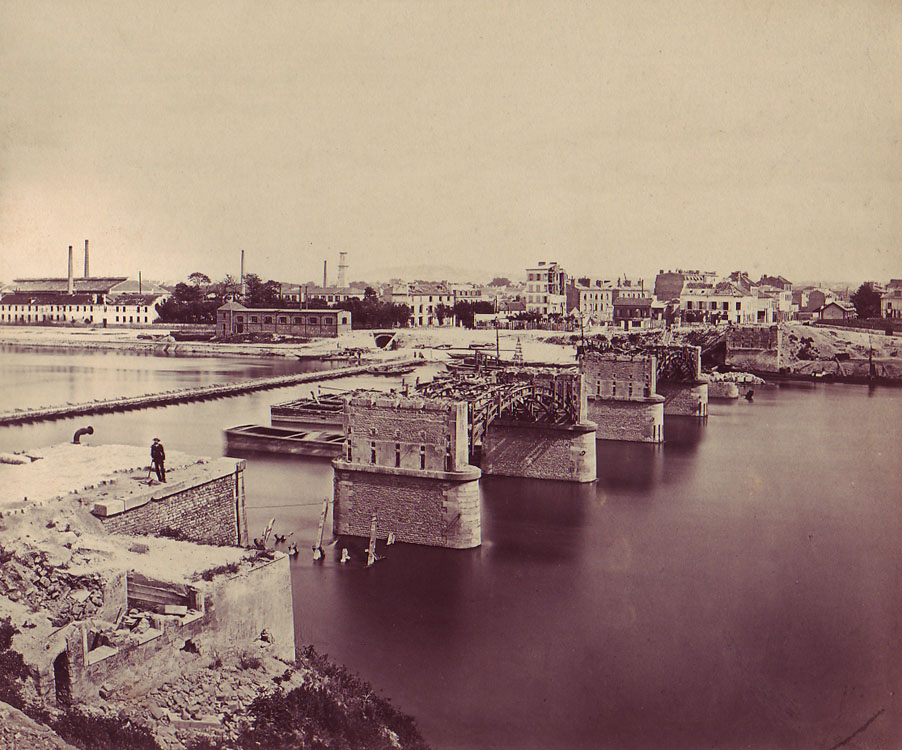
Asnières, Railway (1871) in Paris
