= Resti =

Resti may refer to:

- Resti (family), a noble family of the Republic of Ragusa
- Resti (Ferden), an alpine settlement in the municipality of Ferden in the Swiss canton of Valais
- Burgruine Resti, a ruined castle in the municipality of Meiringen in the Swiss canton of Bern
