= Joch Pass =

Mountain pass in Switzerland

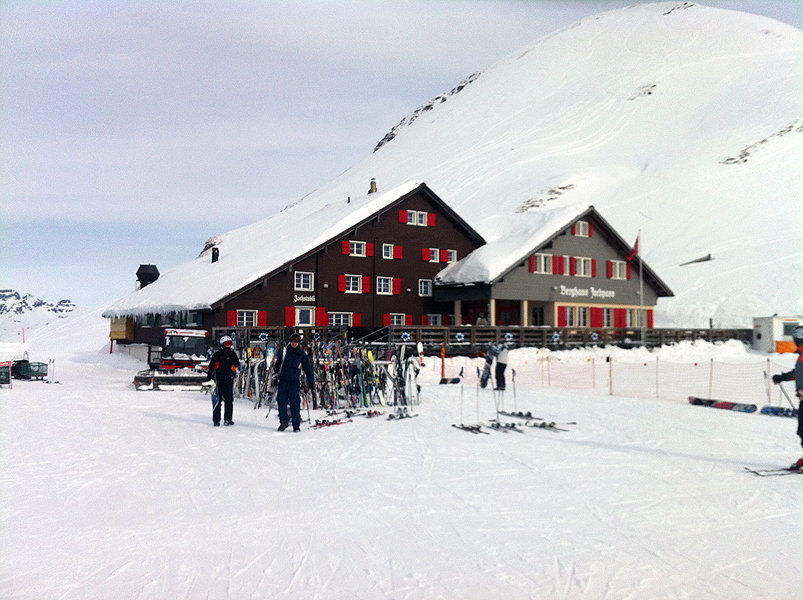
- The Berggasthaus at the Joch Pass in winter

- Location within Switzerland
- Elevation: 2,207 metres (7,241 ft)
- Traversed by: Track or trail

Third Approach
- Location: Bern/Nidwalden, Switzerland
- Range: Uri Alps
- Coordinates: 46°46′42″N 08°23′12″E

The Joch Pass (German: Jochpass) is a mountain pass of the Uri Alps, located between the Bernese Oberland and Central Switzerland, at the foot of the Titlis. The pass crosses the col between the peaks of Graustock and Jochstock, at an elevation of 2,207 m (7,241 ft) and at the border between the cantons of Bern and Nidwalden.

The pass is traversed by a mule track, now used by hikers and mountain bikers, which connects the town of Engelberg, in the canton of Obwalden and at an elevation of 1,000 m (3,300 ft), with the town of Meiringen, in the canton of Bern and at an elevation of 595 m (1,952 ft). The track forms part of the Alpine Pass Route, a long-distance hiking trail across Switzerland between Sargans and Montreux.

== See also ==
- List of mountain passes in Switzerland
