= Pierre Haubensak =

Swiss painter

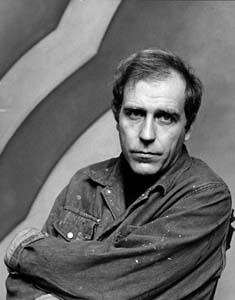
1964

Pierre Haubensak (born 1935) is a painter from Meiringen, Switzerland.

== Career ==
Pierre Haubensak studied at the École des Beaux-Arts in Geneva (1951–1952) and the Basel School of Design (1952–1958). He later lived and worked in Paris (1958–1960), Ibiza (1961–1969), New York City (1969–1977), before returning to Zürich, Switzerland, in 1977.

Haubensak's work was influenced by Color field painting and Hard-edge painting. His early series, Doors of Perception (1968–1974), featured abstract panels with a meditative quality. From 1988, his Tetras series further developed his use of geometric compositions, including wall friezes for the reading room of the Zentralbibliothek Zürich.
