= Meiringen =

- Municipality
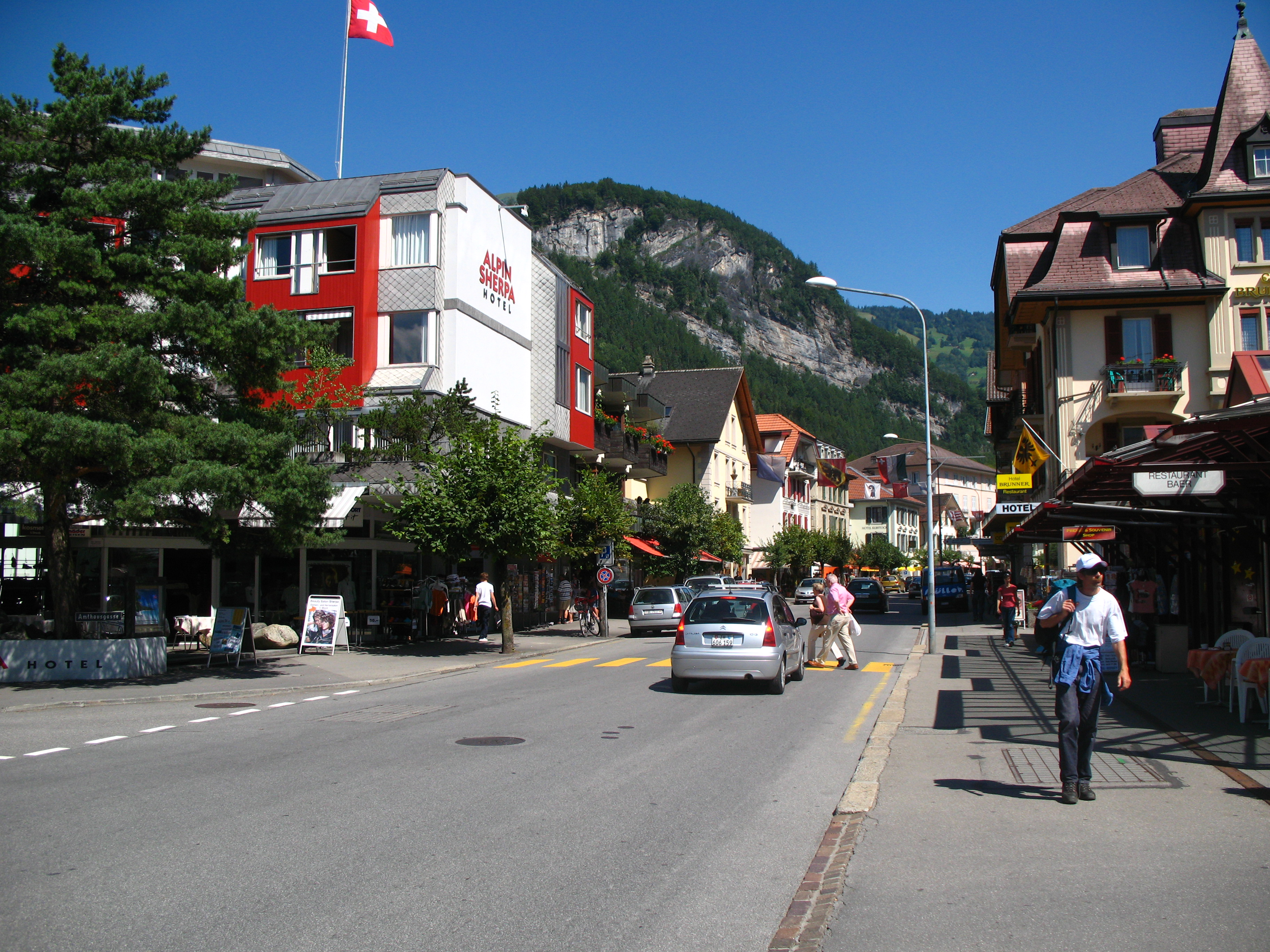

- Flag Coat of arms
- Location of Meiringen
- Location within Switzerland Location within Canton of Bern
- Coordinates: 46°43′39″N 8°11′14″E
- Country: Switzerland
- Canton: Bern
- District: Interlaken-Oberhasli

Government
  - Executive: Gemeinderat with 7 members
  - Mayor: Gemeindepräsident(in); Daniel Studer SPS/PSS (as of 2026)

Area
  - Total: 40.7 km^{2} (15.7 sq mi)
- Elevation: 595 m (1,952 ft)

Population (December 2020)
  - Total: 4,666
  - Density: 115/km^{2} (297/sq mi)
- Time zone: UTC+01:00 (CET)
  - Summer (DST): UTC+02:00 (CEST)
- Postal code: 3860
- SFOS number: 785
- ISO 3166 code: CH-BE
- Surrounded by: Brienz, Brienzwiler, Grindelwald, Hasliberg, Innertkirchen, Lungern (OW), Schattenhalb
- Website: www.meiringen.ch

Meiringen (Swiss Standard German pronunciation: [ˈmaɪrɪŋən]) is a municipality in the Interlaken-Oberhasli administrative district in the canton of Bern in Switzerland. Besides the village of Meiringen, the municipality includes the settlements of Balm, Brünigen, Eisenbolgen, Hausen, Prasti, Sand, Stein, Unterbach, Unterheidon, Wylerli and Zaun. The municipal coat of arms shows a black eagle in a yellow field. ("Or an Eagle displayed Sable crowned, beaked, langued and membered of the first.") Formerly the coat of arms of the entire Oberhasli Talschaft, this design continues the imperial coat of arms.

Meiringen is famous for the nearby Reichenbach Falls, a waterfall that was the setting for the final showdown between Sir Arthur Conan Doyle's fictional detective Sherlock Holmes and his nemesis Professor Moriarty. The village is also known for its claim to have been the place where meringue was first created.

== Geography ==
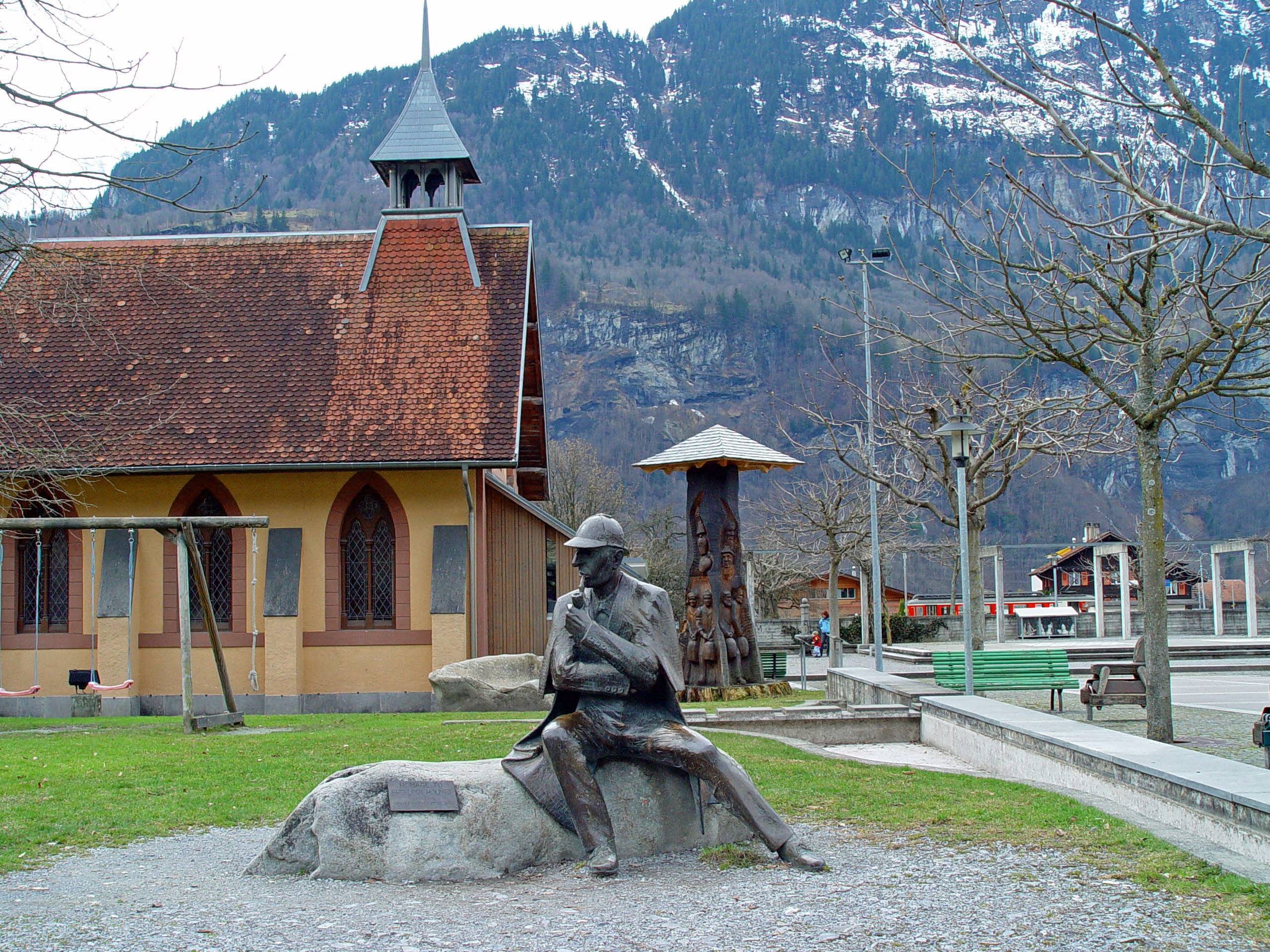
Statue of Holmes and the English Church

Meiringen is located in the eastern Bernese Oberland region, in a valley of the upper reaches of the river Aare, called Haslital, upstream of Lake Brienz. It lies at the foot of several mountain passes, including the Brünig Pass to the valley of the Sarner Aa and hence central Switzerland, the Joch Pass to Engelberg, the Susten Pass to the upper valley of the Reuss, the Grimsel Pass to the valley of the Rhone and hence southern Switzerland, and the Grosse Scheidegg Pass to Grindelwald.

On the right bank of the Aare, the municipality of Meiringen rises from an elevation of 600 m (2,000 ft) on the valley floor to the Brünig Pass at 1,008 m (3,307 ft) and beyond that to a point at 1,375 m (4,511 ft) on the slopes of the Wilerhorn. On the left bank it stretches up into the Alps and reaches an elevation of 3,191 m (10,469 ft) at the summit of the Wellhorn. It includes the village of Meiringen and the settlements of Sand, Stein, Eisenbolgen, Hausen, Balm, Unterbach and Unterheidon in the valley, the village of Brünigen in the Brünig Pass and the hamlets of Prasti, Zaun and Wylerli on the slopes above the valley.

The municipality has an area, as of 2009, of 40.59 square kilometers (15.67 sq mi). Of this area, 17.75 km^{2} (6.85 sq mi) or 43.7% is used for agricultural purposes, while 13.27 km^{2} (5.12 sq mi) or 32.7% is forested. Of the rest of the land, 3.04 km^{2} (1.17 sq mi) or 7.5% is settled (buildings or roads), 0.53 km^{2} (0.20 sq mi) or 1.3% is either rivers or lakes and 6.09 km^{2} (2.35 sq mi) or 15.0% is unproductive land.

Of the built up area, housing and buildings made up 3.1% and transportation infrastructure made up 3.3%. Out of the forested land, 29.7% of the total land area is heavily forested and 1.4% is covered with orchards or small clusters of trees. Of the agricultural land, 3.3% is used for growing crops and 17.8% is pastures and 22.5% is used for alpine pastures. All the water in the municipality is in rivers and streams. Of the unproductive areas, 5.6% is unproductive vegetation and 9.4% is too rocky for vegetation.

== History ==
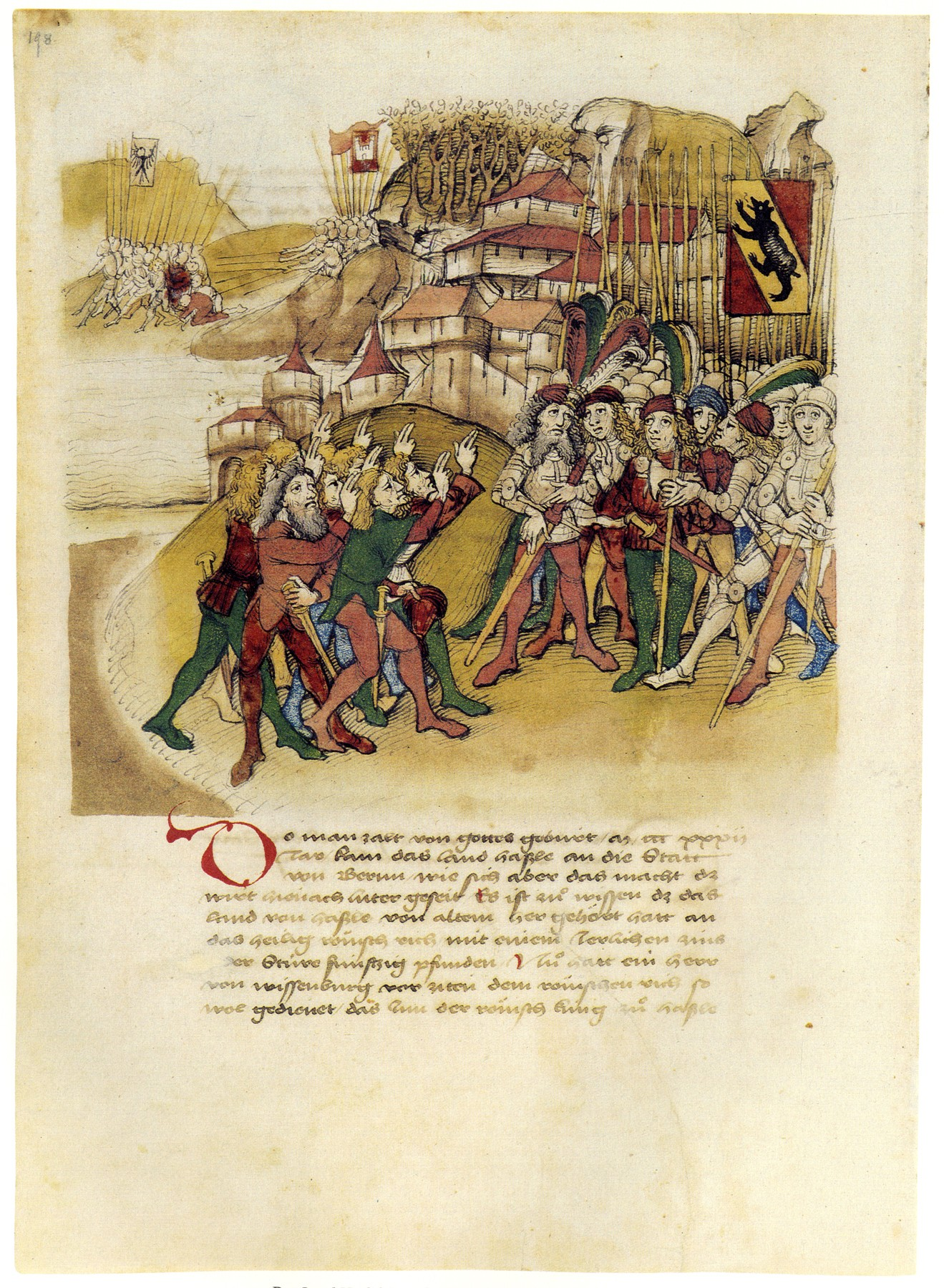
The people of Hasle swear allegiance to Bern in 1334 (depiction in the Spiezer Schilling, 1480s).

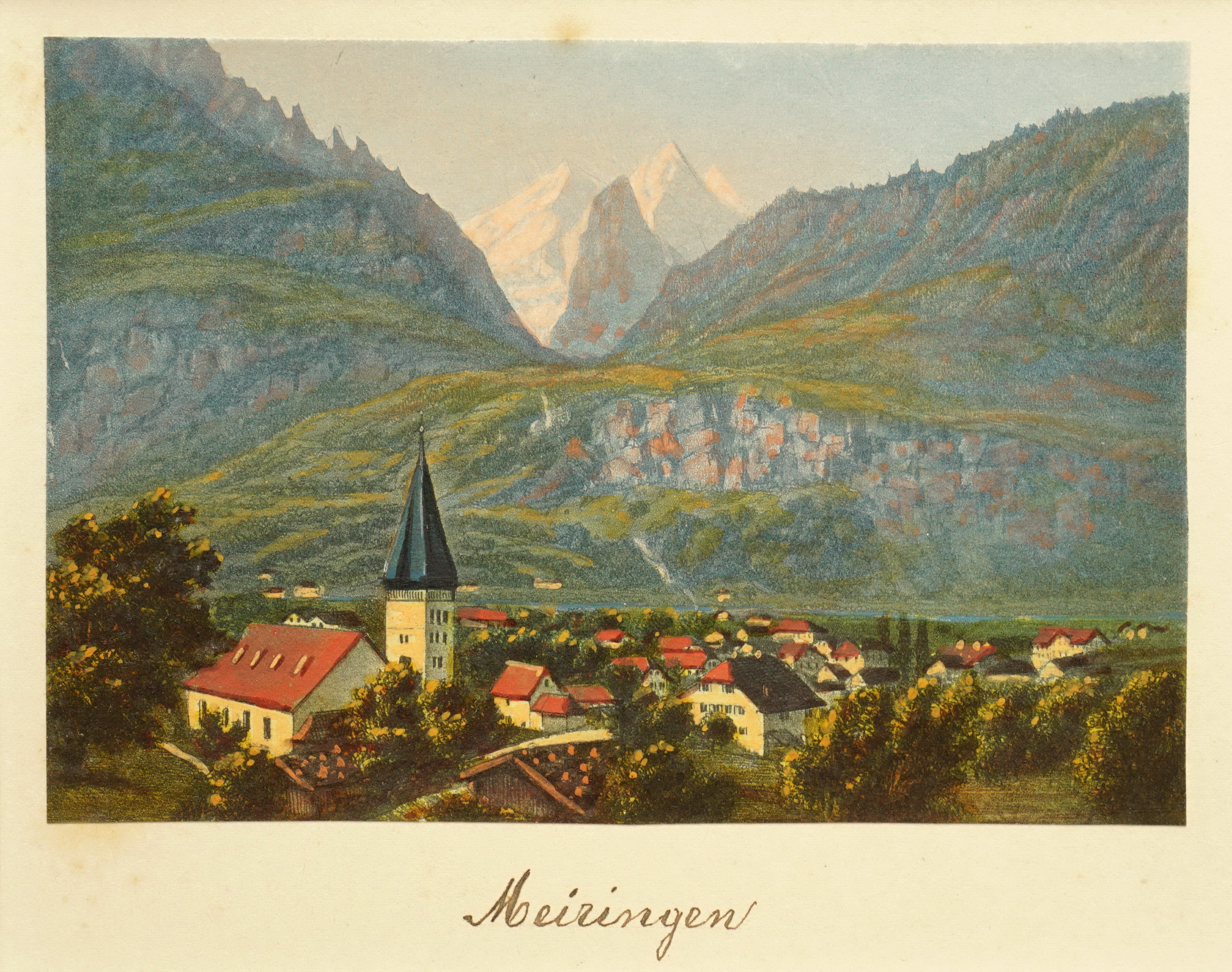
Meiringen c. 1875. Etching by Heinrich Müller

Aerial view (1956)

Meiringen is first mentioned in 1234 as Magiringin. Due to its strategic location at the foot of several alpine passes, the area around Meiringen was settled at least in the Early Middle Ages. The first village church was built in the 9th or 10th century. When it was destroyed in a flood the new church of St. Michael (first mentioned in 1234) was built about 5 m (16 ft) above the old church. The current church of St. Michael dates from the 15th century and was renovated in 1683–84. The Restiturm castle was constructed in the 13th century, whilst the Wyghus fortress in the Brünig Pass was first mentioned in 1333, though it was destroyed later.

Meiringen was always the political capital of the surrounding valley (Talschaft). It was the capital of the Imperial reichsfrei bailiwick of Hasli. In 1275 it formed an alliance with the city of Bern. In 1311, Hasli was given to the house of Weissenburg by Henry VII. After an unsuccessful revolt in 1334, Hasli passed to the city of Bern as a subject territory in name but regained most of its earlier privileges. Under Bernese control it was the capital of the District of Oberhasli until 1798. Following the 1798 French invasion and the creation of the Helvetic Republic it was the capital of the district of Oberhasli in the Canton of Oberland (1798–1803) and then the capital of the District of Oberhasli in the canton of Bern. The village was the home of the Talschaft council and the regional court met at the cross street in front of the churchyard. Today it is still home to the Bernese District authorities, though many of the administrative offices and the district court are now in Interlaken.

Meiringen was the only market town in the valley with a yearly fair starting in 1417. In 1490 this became a weekly market. Traders from the lowlands of Lombardy came here to purchase cattle, horses, and cheese. Located at the foot of Brunig, Grimsel, Susten and Joch passes, Meiringen was a hub in the trade from the lowlands through the passes. Outside of Meiringen village the main occupation was agriculture or cattle farming until the 19th century. Originally there were six Bäuert (farming collectives) among the villages and hamlets in the valley.

In the 1550s, a series of floods of the Aare destroyed the valley floor villages of Balm and Bürglen, both of which were abandoned. The old village of Unterheid was destroyed in 1762 when the Aare changed its course, though the village was rebuilt in a new location. In 1734 the Alpbach wall was built to protect against the river, though this problem was not solved until the 1866–1880 Aare water correction project.

The population growth after 1800 led to impoverishment and forced many to emigrate, mainly to America. Beginning in 1880, the growth of tourism brought new wealth into the valley. Increasing tourist traffic came over the roads that were opened over the Brünig (1859–1861), the Grimsel (1847–1894) and the Susten (1939–1946) passes. The Brünigbahn (Brünig railway) opened in 1888, making it easier for tourists to come into the valley. Following fires in 1879 and 1891, much of the village was rebuilt with tourists in mind. In 1913 Meiringen had 18 hotels with 500 beds. In 1912, the Meiringen–Reichenbach–Aareschlucht tramway was constructed to link the village to the Reichenbach Falls and Aare Gorge, two of the principle local tourist attractions; the line survived until closure in 1956.

In 1892 Arthur Conan Doyle visited the Reichenbach Falls outside Meiringen and subsequently used them as the setting for the struggle between Sherlock Holmes and Professor Moriarty in his story The Final Problem.

During World War II, the tourism industry collapsed, so the Federal Government created jobs by opening the Unterbach military airfield; the federal armory; the SBB depot; the power plants at Oberhasli AG and in hospitals. The municipal museum was founded in 1968 and the Sherlock Holmes Museum opened in 1991.

== Demographics ==
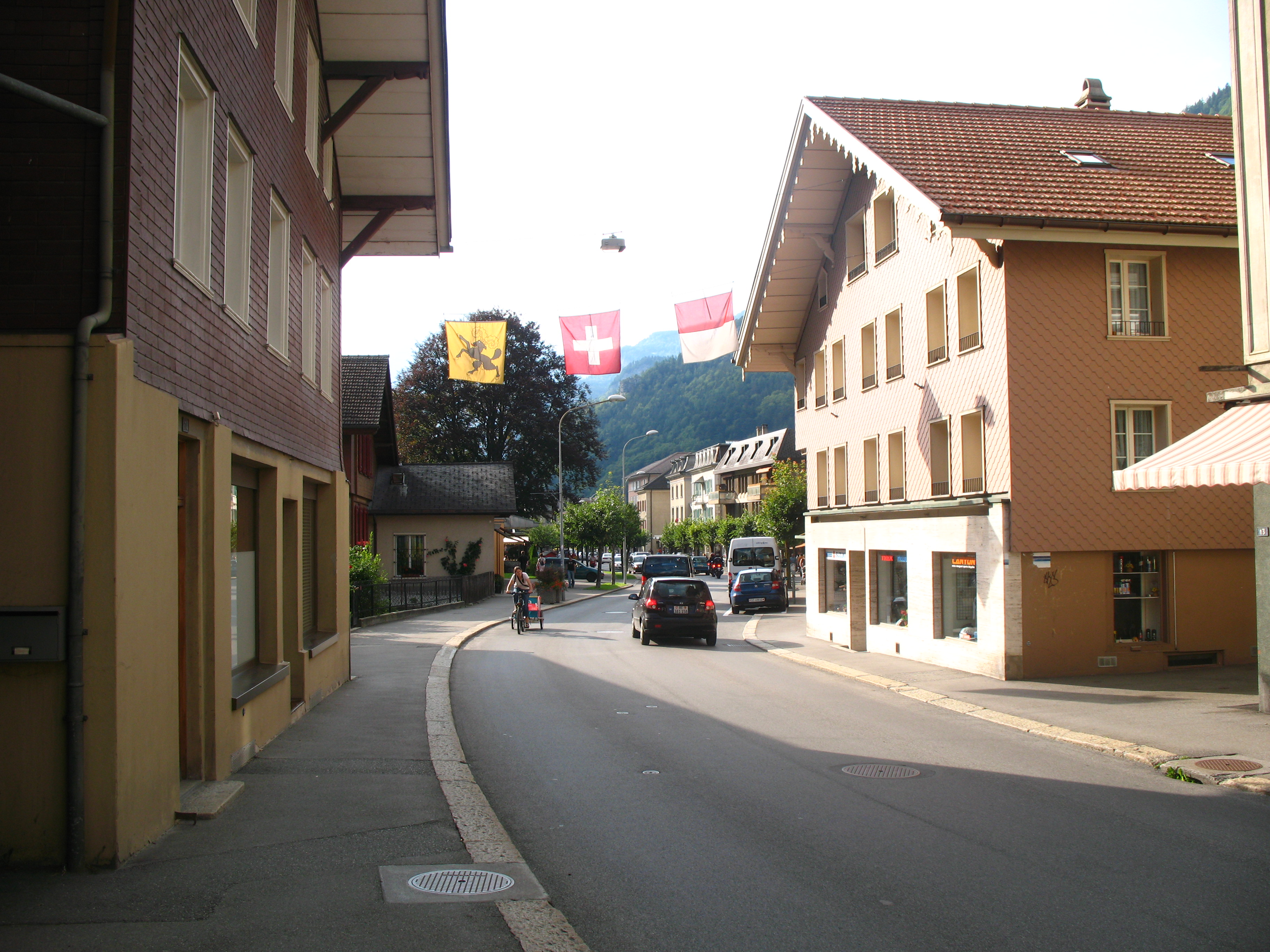
Rudenz, a residential street in Meiringen

Meiringen has a population (as of December 2020) of 4,666. As of 2010, 14.2% of the population are resident foreign nationals. Over the last 10 years (2000–2010) the population has changed at a rate of −2.1%. Migration accounted for −0.2%, while births and deaths accounted for −0.9%.

Most of the population (as of 2000) speaks German (4,190 or 88.7%) as their first language, Serbo-Croatian is the second most common (120 or 2.5%) and Portuguese is the third (77 or 1.6%). There are 43 people who speak French, 62 people who speak Italian and 2 people who speak Romansh.

As of 2008, the population was 48.7% male and 51.3% female. The population was made up of 1,888 Swiss men (41.2% of the population) and 342 (7.5%) non-Swiss men. There were 2,044 Swiss women (44.6%) and 309 (6.7%) non-Swiss women. Of the population in the municipality, 1,761 or about 37.3% were born in Meiringen and lived there in 2000. There were 1,326 or 28.1% who were born in the same canton, while 720 or 15.2% were born somewhere else in Switzerland, and 751 or 15.9% were born outside of Switzerland.

As of 2000, children and teenagers (0–19 years old) make up 23.9% of the population, while adults (20–64 years old) make up 58.9% and seniors (over 64 years old) make up 17.2%.

As of 2000, there were 1,940 people who were single and never married in the municipality. There were 2,222 married individuals, 356 widows or widowers and 205 individuals who are divorced.

As of 2000, there were 1,968 private households in the municipality, and an average of 2.2 persons per household. There were 695 households that consist of only one person and 114 households with five or more people. In 2000, a total of 1,893 apartments (81.6% of the total) were permanently occupied, while 337 apartments (14.5%) were seasonally occupied and 90 apartments (3.9%) were empty. As of 2009, the construction rate of new housing units was 2.2 new units per 1000 residents. The vacancy rate for the municipality, in 2010, was 0.28%.

The historical population is given in the following chart:

== Sights ==
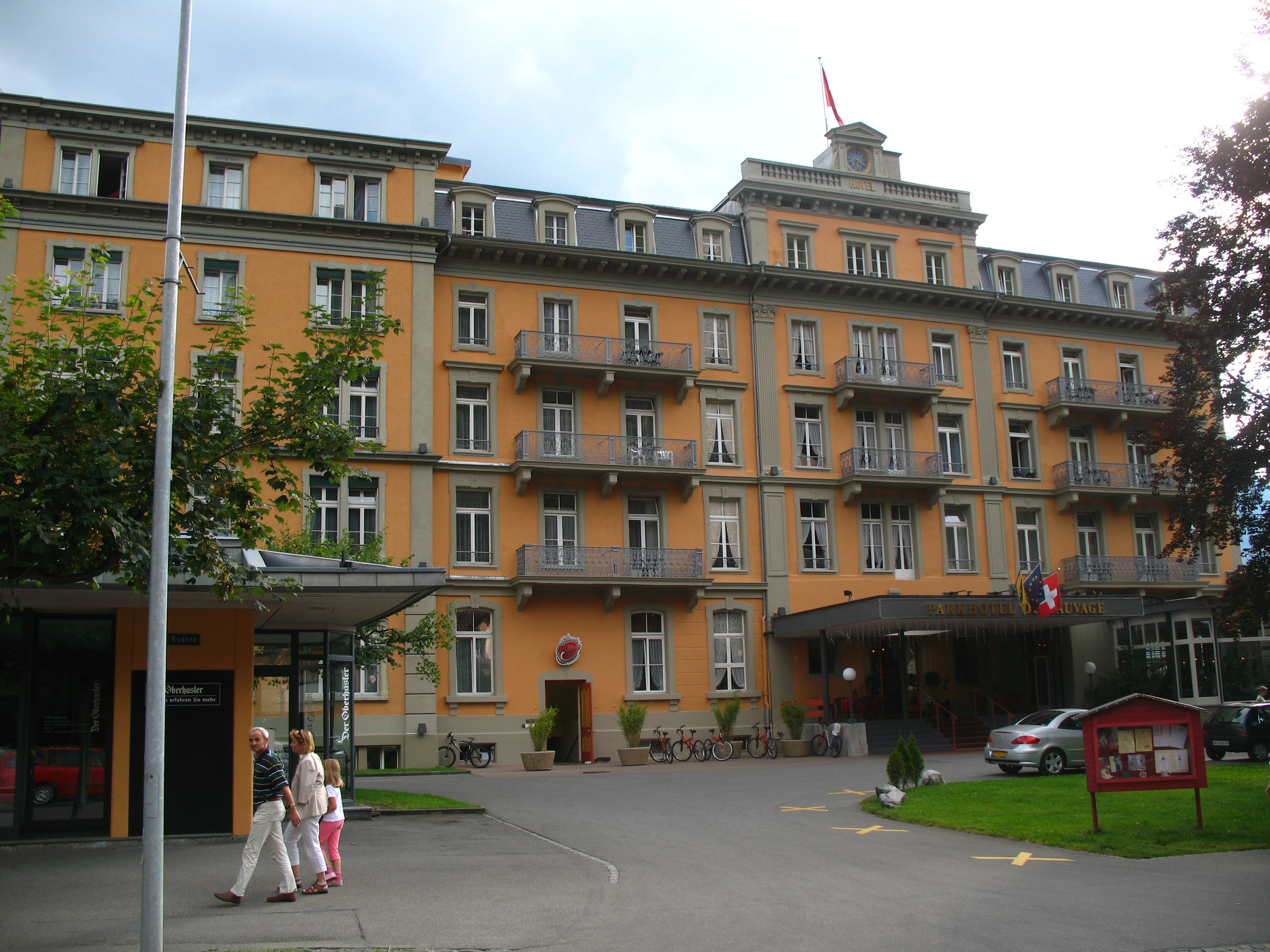
Hotel Sauvage

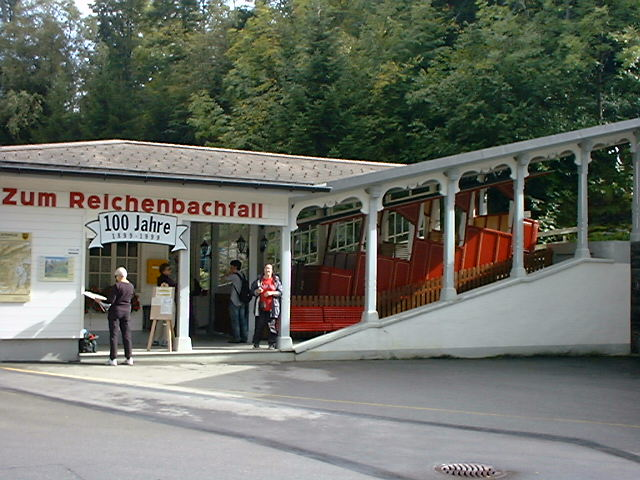
Reichenbachfall-Bahn

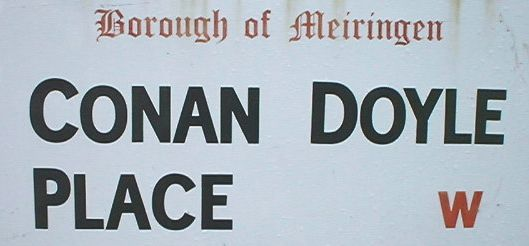
Street sign outside Holmes museum

The Hotel Sauvage, the Swiss Reformed church with outbuildings, and the Reichenbachfall-Bahn are listed on the Swiss inventory of cultural property of national and regional significance. The urbanized village of Meiringen and the hamlet of Brünigen are both on the Inventory of Swiss Heritage Sites.

The ruined castle of Restiturm lies just to the east of the centre of Meiringen, and once commanded the various trade routes that passed through the village.

A museum dedicated to Holmes is located in the basement of the deconsecrated English Church, located in what has now been named Conan Doyle Place. Its highlight is a detailed and authentic recreation of the sitting room at 221B Baker Street, London. The museum was officially opened by Air Cdt Dame Jean Conan Doyle, Lady Bromet, the younger daughter of Sir Arthur Conan Doyle, in May 1991.

== Politics ==
In the 2007 federal election the most popular party was the SVP which received 41.85% of the vote. The next three most popular parties were the SPS (25.15%), the FDP (12.54%) and the Green Party (11.29%). In the federal election, a total of 1,432 votes were cast, and the voter turnout was 44.4%.

== Economy ==
As of 2010, Meiringen had an unemployment rate of 1.9%. As of 2008, there were 186 people employed in the primary economic sector and about 72 businesses involved in this sector. 528 people were employed in the secondary sector and there were 55 businesses in this sector. 1,762 people were employed in the tertiary sector, with 202 businesses in this sector.

In 2008 the total number of full-time equivalent jobs was 2,021. The number of jobs in the primary sector was 110, all of which were in agriculture. The number of jobs in the secondary sector was 490 of which 84 or (17.1%) were in manufacturing, 6 or (1.2%) were in mining and 369 (75.3%) were in construction. The number of jobs in the tertiary sector was 1,421. In the tertiary sector; 263 or 18.5% were in wholesale or retail sales or the repair of motor vehicles, 174 or 12.2% were in the movement and storage of goods, 190 or 13.4% were in a hotel or restaurant, 36 or 2.5% were the insurance or financial industry, 93 or 6.5% were technical professionals or scientists, 56 or 3.9% were in education and 339 or 23.9% were in health care.

In 2000, there were 1,029 workers who commuted into the municipality and 560 workers who commuted away. The municipality is a net importer of workers, with about 1.8 workers entering the municipality for every one leaving. Of the working population, 10.6% used public transportation to get to work, and 36.8% used a private car.

== Religion ==
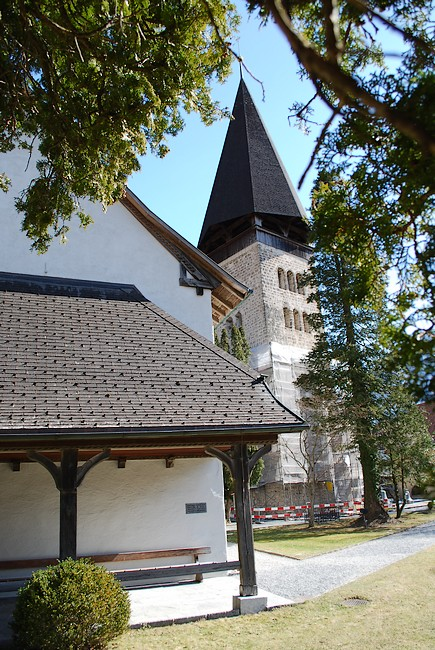
Meiringen reformed church

From the 2000 census, 815 or 17.3% were Roman Catholic, while 3,134 or 66.4% belonged to the Swiss Reformed Church. Of the rest of the population, there were 49 members of an Orthodox church (or about 1.04% of the population), and there were 153 individuals (or about 3.24% of the population) who belonged to another Christian church. There was 1 individual who was Jewish, and 153 (or about 3.24% of the population) who were Islamic. There were 7 individuals who were Buddhist, 16 individuals who were Hindu and 2 individuals who belonged to another church. 270 (or about 5.72% of the population) belonged to no church, are agnostic or atheist, and another 194 individuals (or about 4.11% of the population) did not answer the question.

== Transport ==
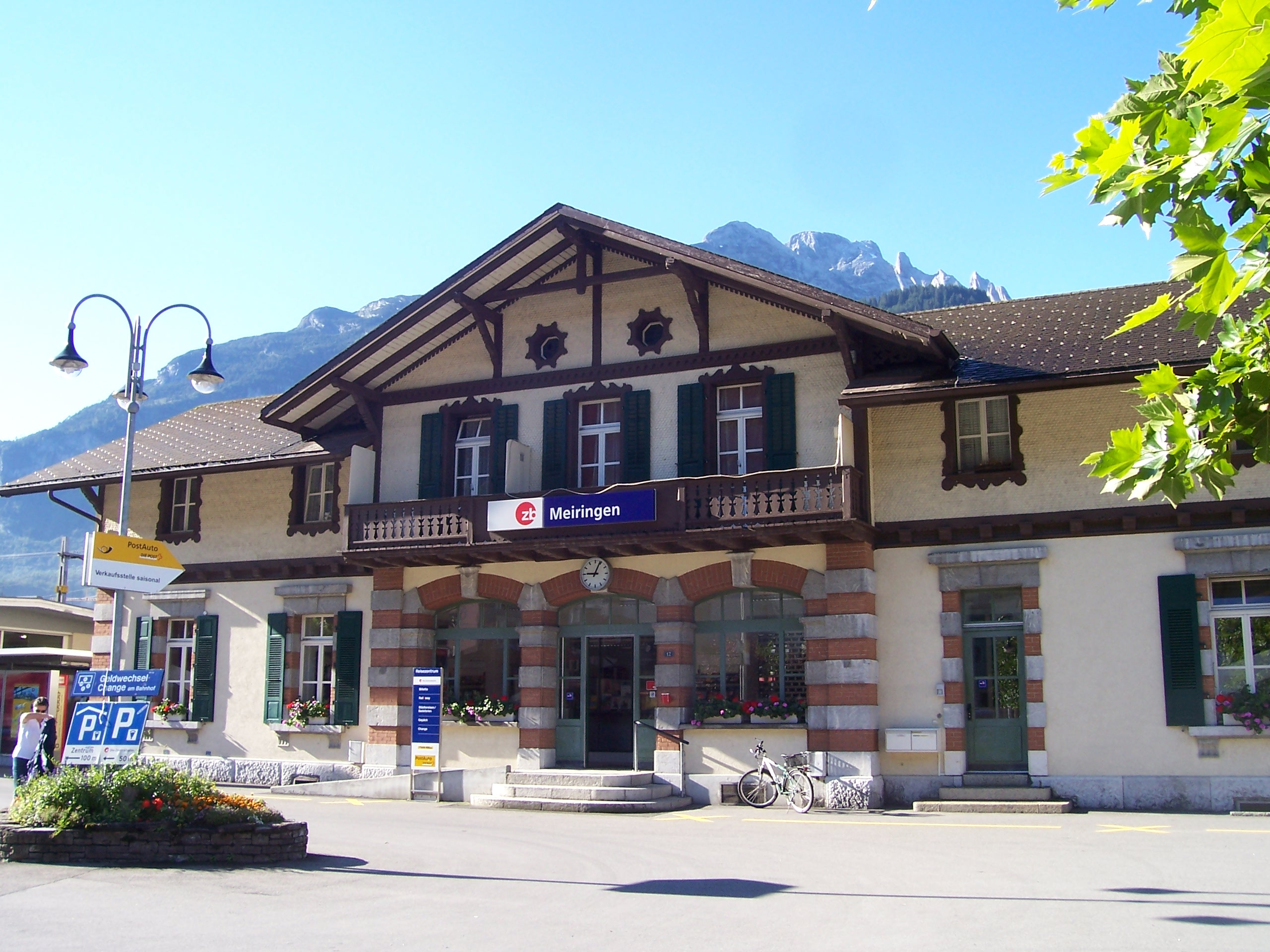
Meiringen railway station

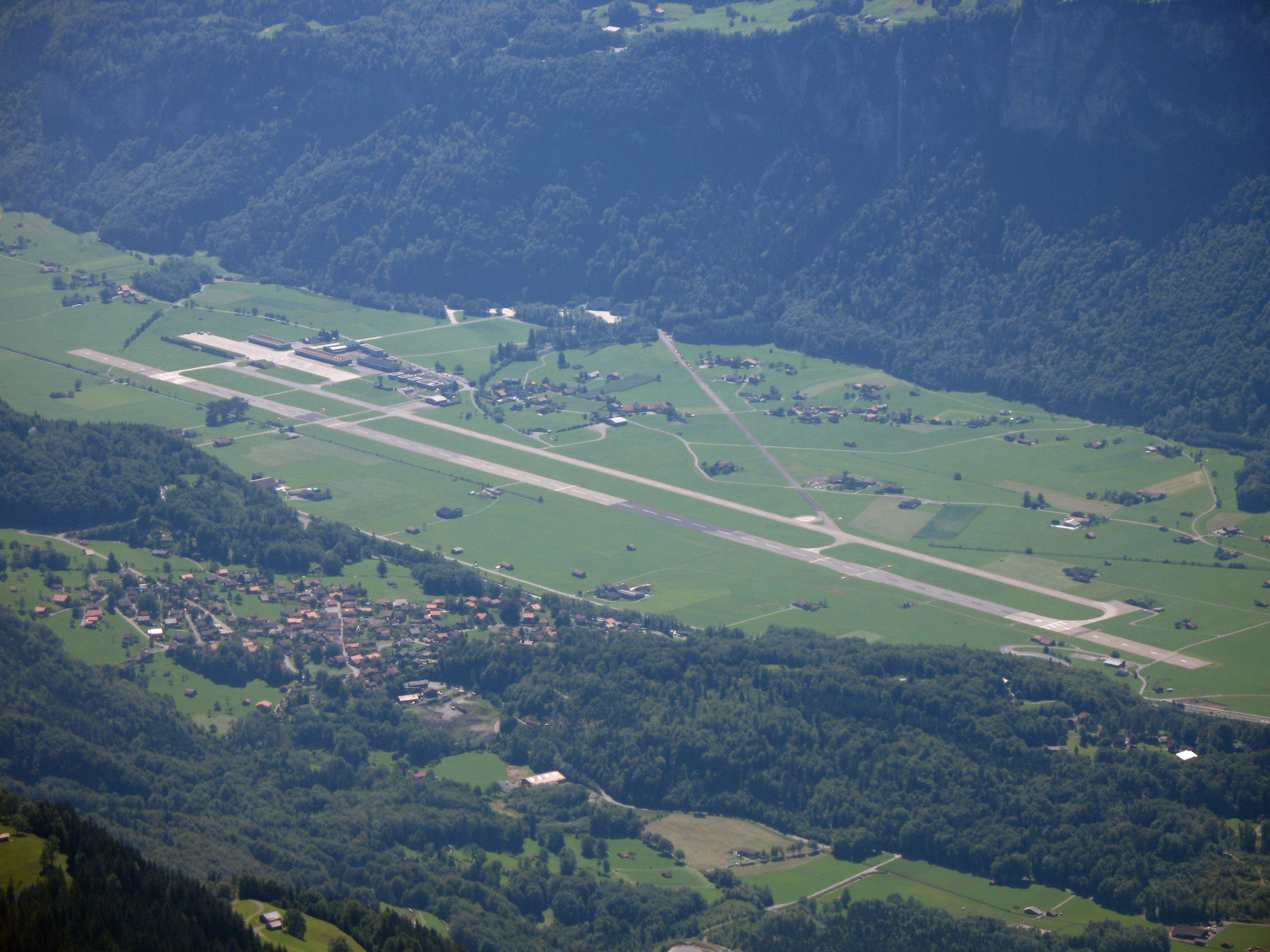
Meiringen Air Force Base

Meiringen is served by Meiringen station on the Brünig line, a narrow-gauge railway from Interlaken to Lucerne. The same line's Brünig-Hasliberg station, on the Brünig Pass, is also within the municipal boundaries. Both stations are served by an hourly InterRegio service between Interlaken and Lucerne, whilst Meiringen is also the terminus of an hourly Regio service from Interlaken.

Meiringen station is also the terminus of the local Meiringen–Innertkirchen railway, which links the village with the nearby village of Innertkirchen. The first two intermediate stations on this line, at Alpbach and Aareschlucht West, are also within the municipal boundaries.

The lower terminus of the Reichenbachfall Funicular, which links the village to the Reichenbach Falls, is located at Willigen, some 20 minutes walk, or a 6-minute bus ride, from Meiringen station. On the opposite side of the valley, a cable car runs to Reuti, from where a system of Gondola lifts runs to Planplatten, at over 2,200 m (7,200 ft), via Mägisalp.

The village is located on one of the two south-western road approaches to the Brünig Pass, which provides a connection from the Brünig Pass to the Grimsel Pass, and hence a route between Central Switzerland and the Rhone Valley. The other south-western approach to the Brünig Pass, from Interlaken, passes west of the village but through part of the municipality. A third road joins the previous two along the valley of the Aare, providing a route from Interlaken to the Grimsel Pass and Susten Pass.

The Meiringen air base is one of three main air bases of the Swiss Air Force. It is the only Swiss Air Force Base to still use its aircraft cavern regularly. It is located in Unterbach. Among other aircraft, it operates mainly F/A-18 Hornet fighter jets.

== Education ==
In Meiringen about 1,846 or (39.1%) of the population have completed non-mandatory upper secondary education, and 451 or (9.5%) have completed additional higher education (either university or a Fachhochschule). Of the 451 who completed tertiary schooling, 63.4% were Swiss men, 22.4% were Swiss women, 6.7% were non-Swiss men and 7.5% were non-Swiss women.

The Canton of Bern school system provides one year of non-obligatory Kindergarten, followed by six years of Primary school. This is followed by three years of obligatory lower Secondary school where the students are separated according to ability and aptitude. Following the lower Secondary students may attend additional schooling or they may enter an apprenticeship.

During the 2009–10 school year, there were a total of 635 students attending classes in Meiringen. There were 5 kindergarten classes with a total of 91 students in the municipality. Of the kindergarten students, 6.6% were permanent or temporary residents of Switzerland (not citizens) and 8.8% have a different mother language than the classroom language. The municipality had 15 primary classes and 289 students. Of the primary students, 12.8% were permanent or temporary residents of Switzerland (not citizens) and 12.4% have a different mother language than the classroom language. During the same year, there were 12 lower secondary classes with a total of 228 students. There were 6.6% who were permanent or temporary residents of Switzerland (not citizens) and 5.7% have a different mother language than the classroom language.

As of 2000, there were 105 students in Meiringen who came from another municipality, while 59 residents attended schools outside the municipality. Meiringen is home to the Bibliothek Kapellen library. The library has (as of 2008) 9,916 books or other media, and loaned out 20,617 items in the same year. It was open a total of 169 days with average of 8 hours per week during that year.

== Notable people ==
- Christian Menn (1927–2018), a bridge designer from Switzerland
- Pierre Haubensak (born 1935) a painter

== Climate ==
This area has a long winter season with 5 months average temperature more than 10 °C, with little precipitation mostly in the form of snow, and low humidity. The Köppen Climate System classifies the climate in Meiringen as temperate oceanic climate, and abbreviates this as Cfb.

Climate data for Meiringen, elevation 589 m (1,932 ft), (1991–2020)
Month	Jan	Feb	Mar	Apr	May	Jun	Jul	Aug	Sep	Oct	Nov	Dec	Year
Mean daily maximum °C (°F)	2.3 (36.1)	4.7 (40.5)	10.3 (50.5)	14.7 (58.5)	18.7 (65.7)	21.9 (71.4)	23.6 (74.5)	23.0 (73.4)	18.8 (65.8)	14.0 (57.2)	7.6 (45.7)	2.5 (36.5)	13.5 (56.3)
Daily mean °C (°F)	−1.1 (30.0)	0.4 (32.7)	5.0 (41.0)	9.2 (48.6)	13.2 (55.8)	16.5 (61.7)	17.9 (64.2)	17.4 (63.3)	13.6 (56.5)	9.1 (48.4)	3.7 (38.7)	−0.5 (31.1)	8.7 (47.7)
Mean daily minimum °C (°F)	−5.0 (23.0)	−4.2 (24.4)	−0.3 (31.5)	3.1 (37.6)	7.3 (45.1)	11.0 (51.8)	12.5 (54.5)	12.1 (53.8)	8.6 (47.5)	4.6 (40.3)	−0.1 (31.8)	−3.9 (25.0)	3.8 (38.8)
Average precipitation mm (inches)	82.5 (3.25)	72.1 (2.84)	85.0 (3.35)	89.8 (3.54)	137.1 (5.40)	148.0 (5.83)	160.2 (6.31)	174.2 (6.86)	107.8 (4.24)	92.2 (3.63)	94.7 (3.73)	97.6 (3.84)	1,341.2 (52.80)
Average snowfall cm (inches)	26.3 (10.4)	28.2 (11.1)	14.0 (5.5)	4.1 (1.6)	0.2 (0.1)	0.0 (0.0)	0.0 (0.0)	0.0 (0.0)	0.0 (0.0)	1.1 (0.4)	12.4 (4.9)	27.2 (10.7)	113.5 (44.7)
Average precipitation days (≥ 1.0 mm)	10.0	9.0	10.2	10.1	12.3	14.0	14.0	13.8	10.3	9.8	10.0	10.8	134.3
Average snowy days (≥ 1.0 cm)	4.3	4.2	2.7	0.9	0.1	0.0	0.0	0.0	0.0	0.1	2.0	4.1	18.4
Average relative humidity (%)	85	79	73	70	73	75	76	79	81	83	84	86	79
Source 1: NOAA
Source 2: MeteoSwiss
