= Restiturm =

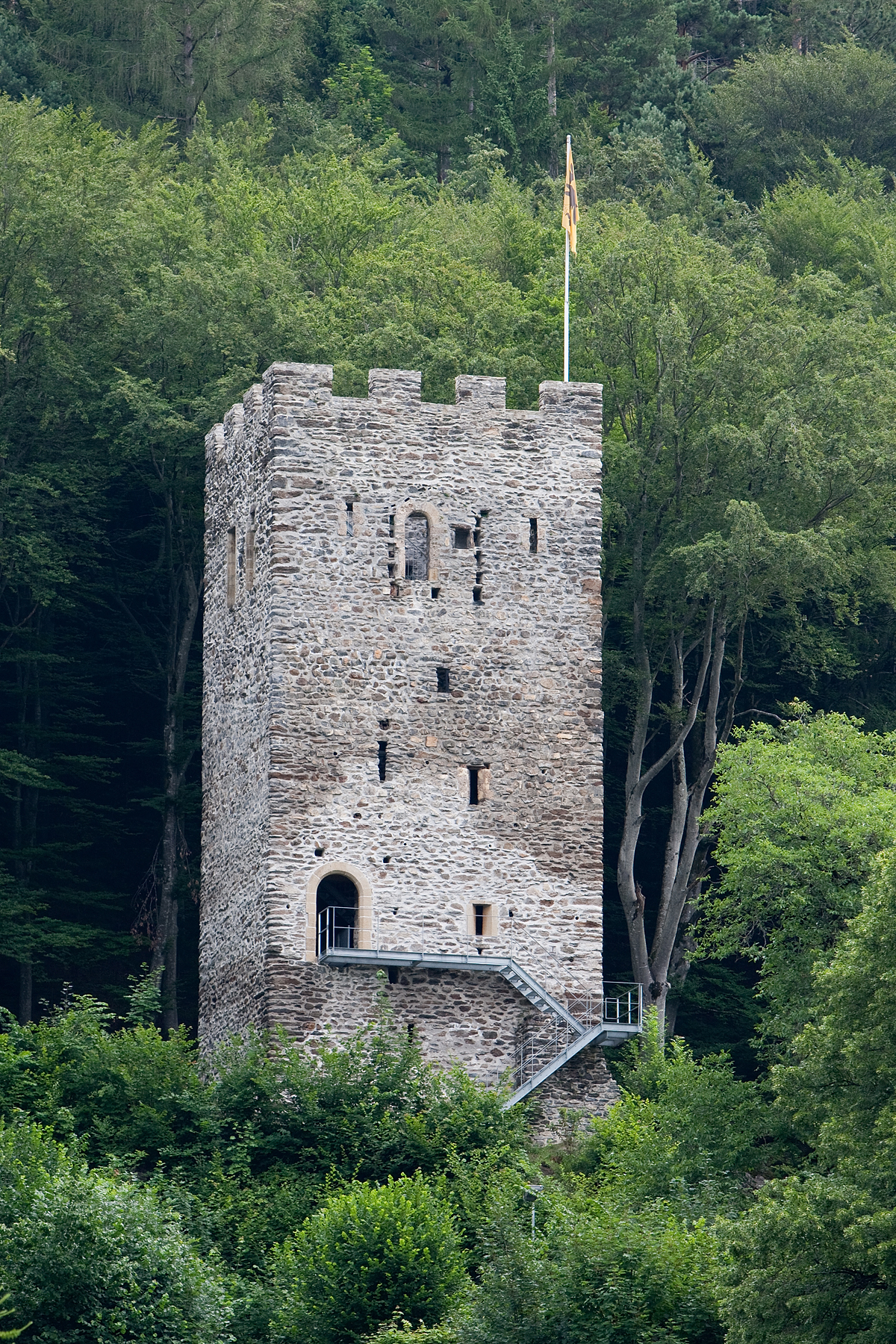

- Location within Switzerland
- 46°43′36.49″N 8°11′46.39″E
- Location: Meiringen

History
- Built: 13th century

Site notes
- Governing body: Nonprofit Association

The Restiturm, or Burgruine Resti, is a ruined castle in the municipality of Meiringen in the Swiss canton of Bern. The original castle was built in the 13th century and has been rebuilt several times. The castle is situated at the foot of the Hasliberges. The best preserved part of the castle is its tower, which still stands to this day. An examination of the castle interior reveals that the castle was constructed inside out, with the core's construction beginning in 1250. It took another 50 years before the iconic tower was completed.

The castle was the seat of the Knights of Resti, vassals of the Habsburgs. The first construction was in 1250 by Peter von Resti. It overlooks the Haslital and served to control and protect the valley and the trade routes across the Grimsel Pass, Joch Pass, Susten Pass, Grosse Scheidegg and Brünig Pass.

In the 16th century, the castle was abandoned and fell into disrepair. It was restored in 1914 and again in 2004. During this latter renovation, information boards, steel ladders and a terrace were added. Today, only the tower remains. It is owned by the nonprofit association Meiringen and is a listed building.
