= Reichenbach Falls =

Waterfall in Switzerland

- German: Reichenbachfälle
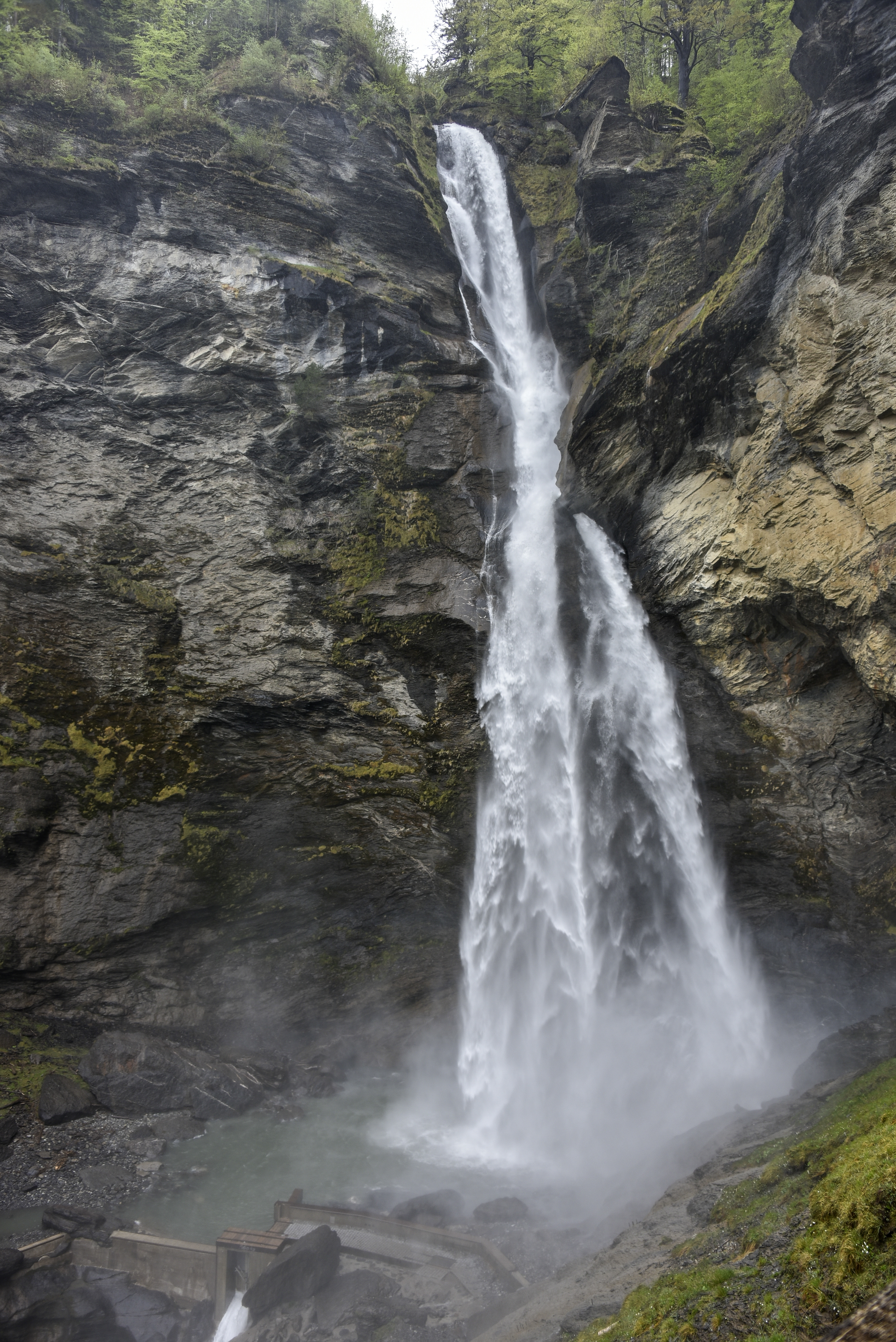
- The Grand Reichenbach Fall

- Location within Switzerland Location within Canton of Bern
- Location: Schattenhalb; Canton of Bern; Switzerland
- Coordinates: 46°42′49″N 8°10′59″E
- Total height: 250 m (820 ft)
- Number of drops: 7
- Average flow rate: 3–5 m^{3}/s (110–180 cu ft/s)

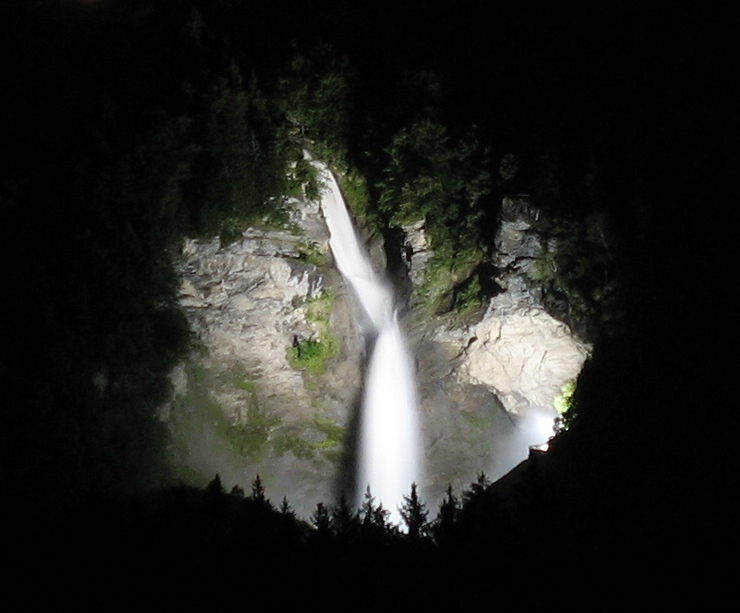
The Grand Reichenbach Fall at night

Reichenbach Falls (German: Reichenbachfälle) is a waterfall in the Bernese Oberland region of Switzerland, which drop a height of 250 metres (820 ft). In literature, the upper Great Reichenbach Fall is the location of the final altercation between Sir Arthur Conan Doyle's hero Sherlock Holmes and his greatest foe, Professor Moriarty, in "The Final Problem".

== Description ==
The Reichenbach Falls have a height of 250 metres (820 ft). At 110 metres (360 ft), the upper Grand Reichenbach Fall (German: Grosser Reichenbachfall) is one of the highest waterfalls in the Alps. It loses 290 metres (950 ft) of height from the top of the falls to the valley floor of the Haslital. A hydroelectric power company harnesses the flow of the Reichenbach Falls during certain times of year, reducing its flow.

== Location ==
The falls are located in the lower part of the Reichenbachtal, on the Rychenbach, a tributary (from the south bank) of the Aare. They are some 1.5 km (0.93 mi) south of the town of Meiringen, and Interlaken. Politically, the falls are within the municipality of Schattenhalb in the canton of Bern.

The falls are made accessible by the Reichenbach Funicular. The lower station is some 20 minutes' walk, or a six-minute bus ride, from Meiringen railway station on the Brünig railway line that links Interlaken and Lucerne.

== In popular culture ==
=== Arthur Conan Doyle's Sherlock Holmes stories ===
The town and the falls are known worldwide as the setting for a fictional event: it is the location where Sir Arthur Conan Doyle's hero, Sherlock Holmes, fights to the death with Professor Moriarty, at the end of "The Final Problem", first published in 1893. A memorial plate at the funicular station commemorates Holmes, and there is also a Sherlock Holmes museum in the nearby town of Meiringen.

Out of many waterfalls in the Bernese Oberland, Reichenbach Falls seems to have made the greatest impression on Sir Arthur Conan Doyle, who was shown them on a Swiss holiday by his host Sir Henry Lunn, the founder of Lunn Poly. Sir Henry's grandson, Peter Lunn, recalled, "My grandfather said 'Push him over the Reichenbach Falls' and Conan Doyle hadn’t heard of them, so he showed them to him." So impressed was Doyle that he decided to let his hero die there.

The actual ledge from which Moriarty fell is on the other side of the falls from the funicular; it is accessible by climbing the path to the top of the falls, crossing the bridge and following the trail down the hill. The ledge is marked by a plaque as illustrated here; the English inscription reads: "At this fearful place, Sherlock Holmes vanquished Professor Moriarty, on 4 May 1891." The pathway on which the duel between Sherlock Holmes and Professor Moriarty occurs ends some hundred metres away from the falls. When Doyle viewed the falls, the path ended very close to the falls, close enough to touch it, yet over the hundred years after his visit, the pathway has become unsafe and slowly eroded away, and the falls have receded further back into the gorge.

=== In other media ===
The Reichenbach Falls are the subject of several early 19th-century paintings by the English Romantic landscape painter J. M. W. Turner.

The indie band Ravens & Chimes named its debut album (released in 2007) after the falls.

Another indie band, Racing Mount Pleasant (formerly Kingfisher), has a song named after the falls on its 2022 debut album.

Many adaptations of Sherlock Holmes have featured the confrontation at Reichenbach, notably including the Granada Television series, starring Jeremy Brett as Sherlock Holmes. The Granada adaptation of The Final Problem, with David Burke as Dr Watson and Eric Porter as Professor Moriarty, was filmed at the real Reichenbach Falls. The series later returned there for some scenes in The Empty House, with Edward Hardwicke as Watson.

Reichenbach Falls was also the title of a 2008 BBC Four TV drama by James Mavor, based on an idea by Ian Rankin and set in Edinburgh. Numerous historical characters associated with the city, including Conan Doyle and his mentor Dr Joseph Bell, are mentioned in the story.

Sherlock Holmes: A Game of Shadows, a 2011 film adaptation inspired by "The Final Problem", also hosts the falls, although in this adaptation, a large castle has been built over them, replacing the pathway.

The third episode from the 2012 second series of the BBC drama Sherlock, "The Reichenbach Fall" (inspired by "The Final Problem"), is a play on the waterfall's name. The special episode of Sherlock, "The Abominable Bride", which was broadcast on 1 January 2016, featured a re-creation of the showdown between Sherlock and Moriarty set in Victorian times, as depicted in the book.

The final season of the TV series Elementary features a villain named Odin Reichenbach. The second-last episode, in which the character meets justice, is titled "Reichenbach Falls".

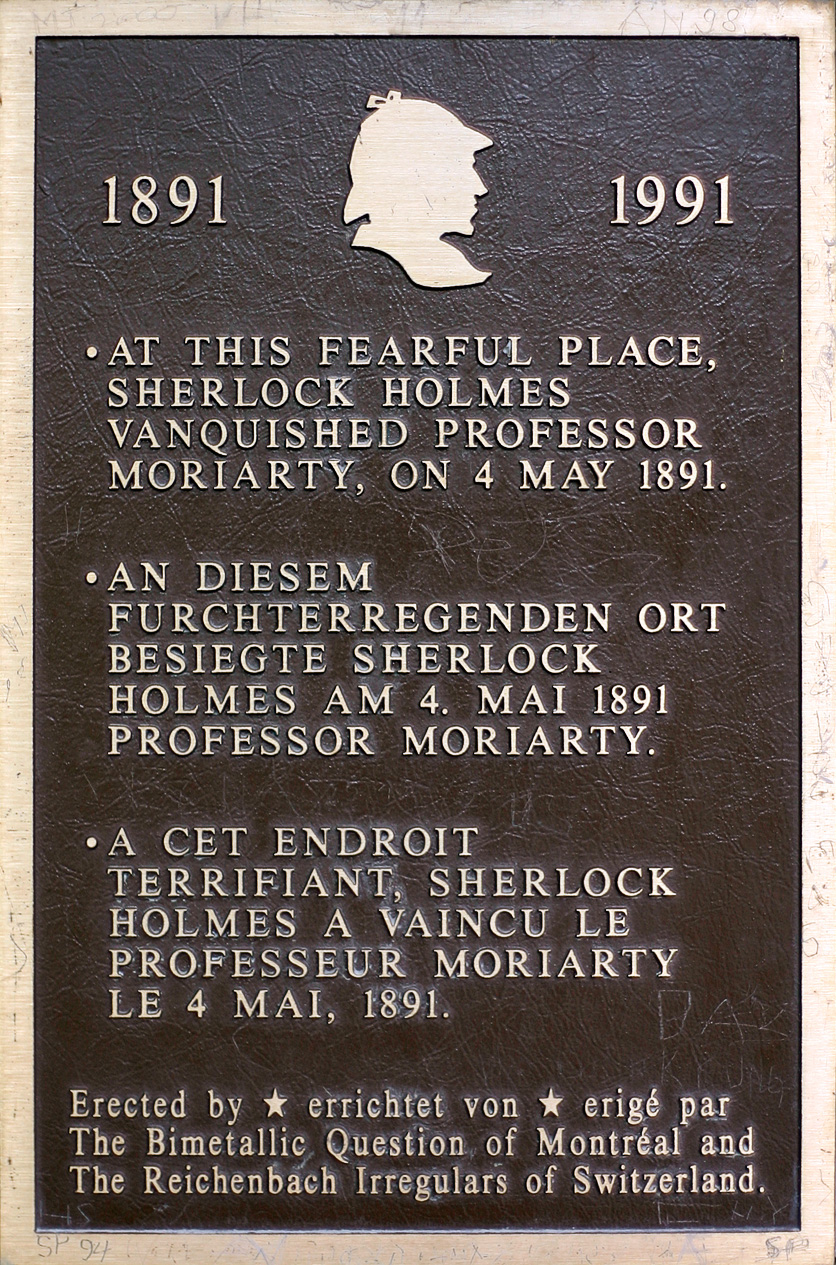
The Holmes plaque on the ledge

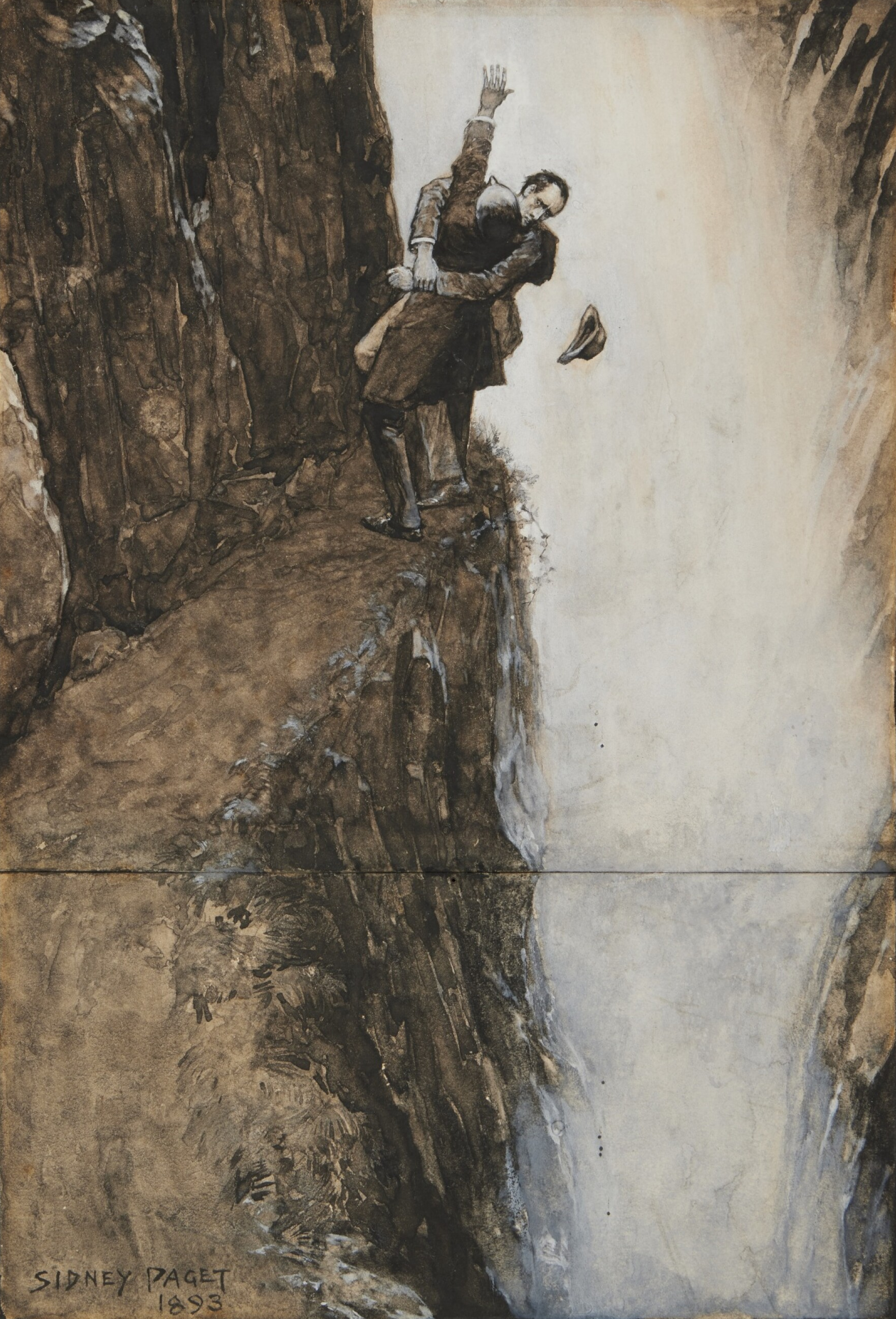
Holmes and Moriarty fighting at Reichenbach Falls, by Sidney Paget

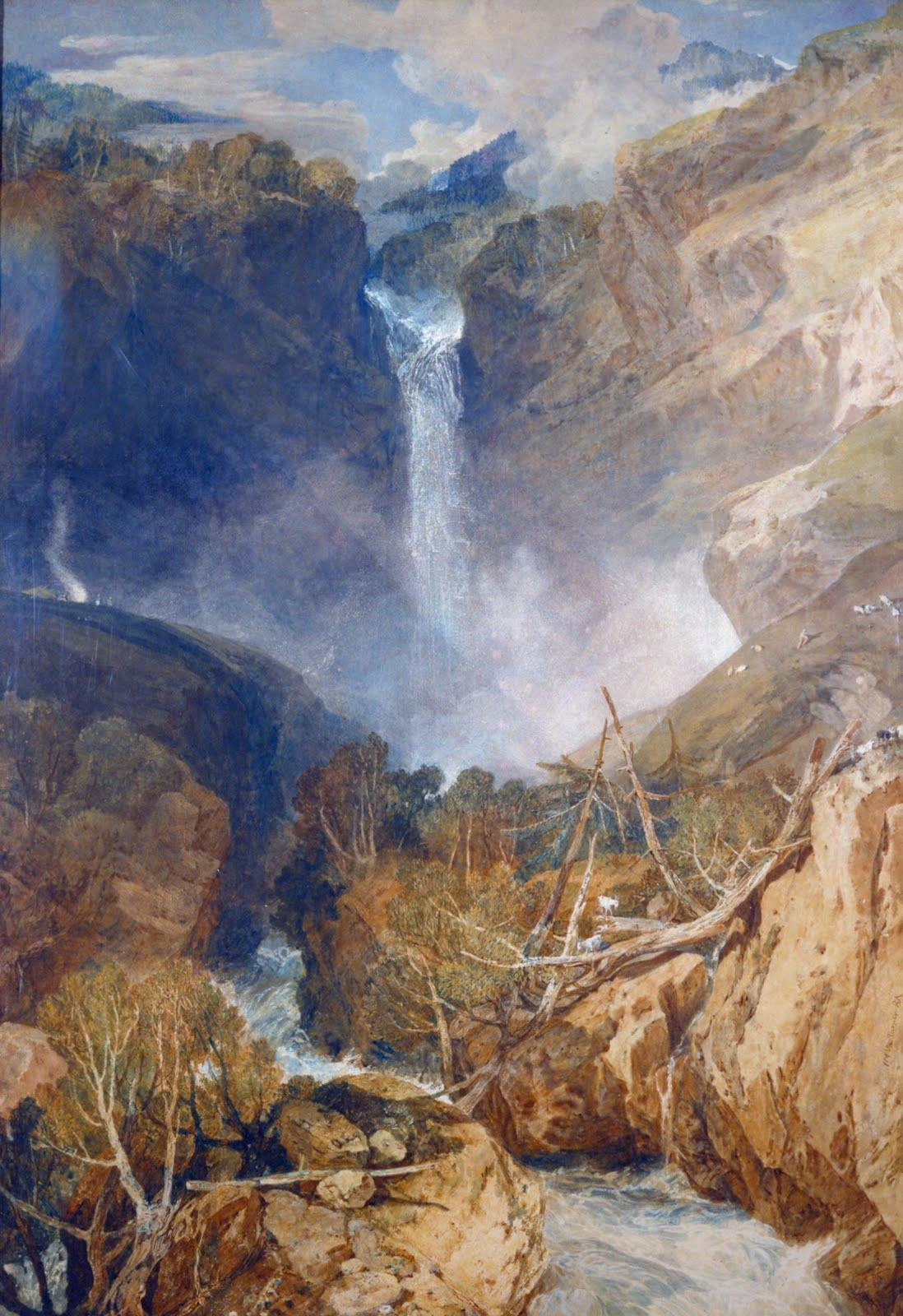
The Great Fall of the Reichenbach, in the Valley of Hasle, Switzerland (1804, watercolour on paper) by J. M. W. Turner

== See also ==
- List of waterfalls
- List of waterfalls in Switzerland
