= Jochstock =

Mountain in Switzerland

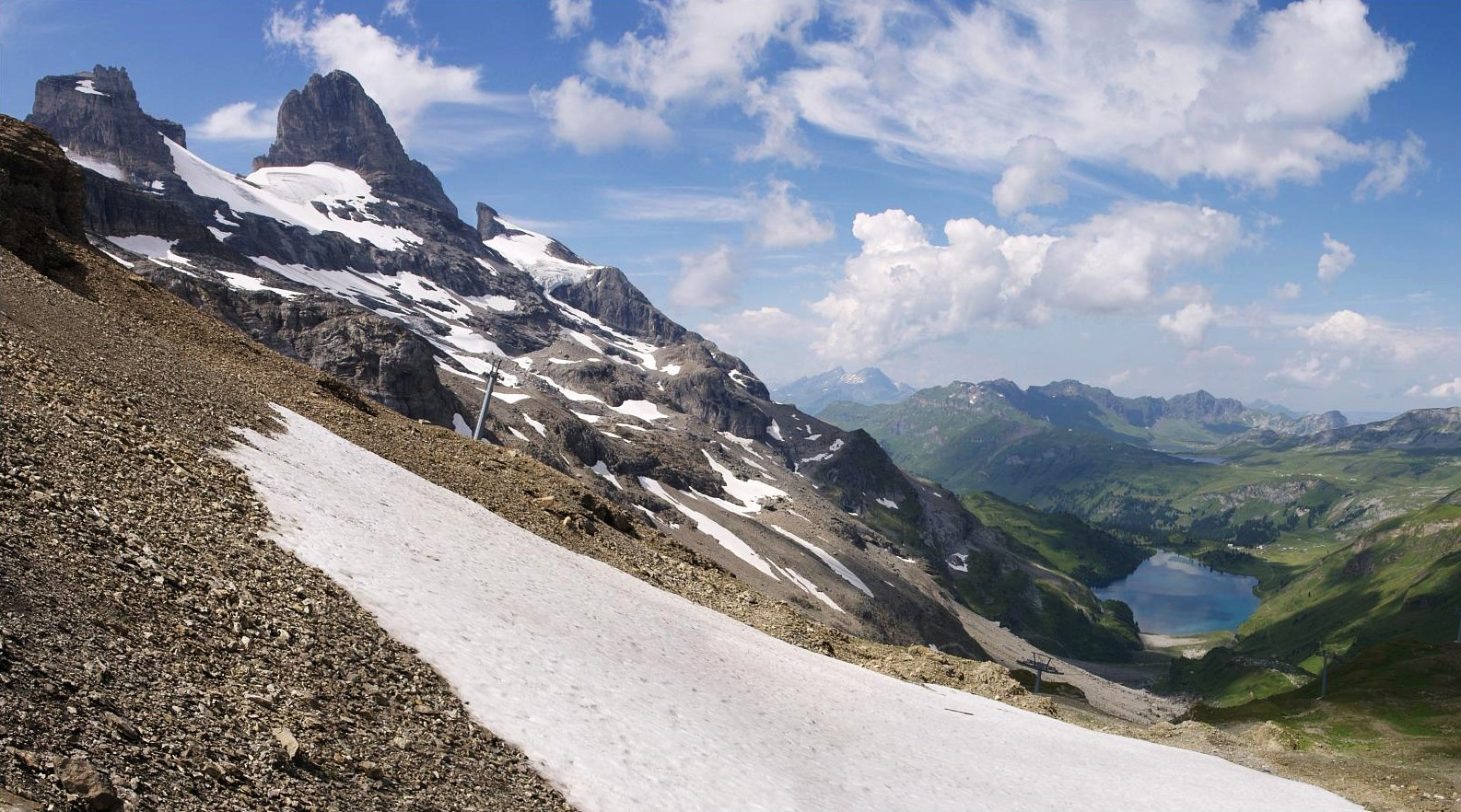
- View from near the summit

Highest point
- Elevation: 2,564 m (8,412 ft)
- Prominence: 19 m (62 ft)
- Parent peak: Titlis
- Coordinates: 46°46′17.3″N 8°23′43.3″E

Geography
- Location within Switzerland
- Location: Bern/Nidwalden/Obwalden, Switzerland
- Parent range: Urner Alps

The Jochstock (2,564 m) is a summit of the Urner Alps, located near Engelberg in Central Switzerland. The summit is one of the two tripoints between the cantons of Bern, Nidwalden and Obwalden (the other being the Graustock).

A platter lift runs from the Joch Pass (2,207 m) to near the summit of the Jochstock.
