= Graustock =

Mountain in Switzerland

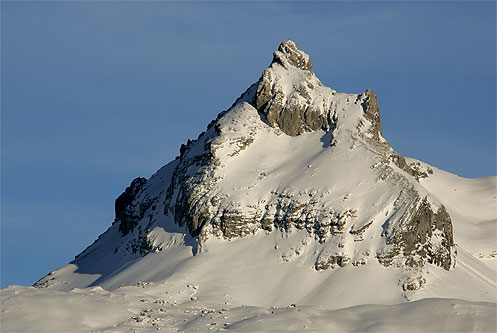
- View from Melchsee-Frutt (west side)

Highest point
- Elevation: 2,662 m (8,734 ft)
- Prominence: 256 m (840 ft)
- Parent peak: Rotsandnollen
- Coordinates: 46°47′16.3″N 8°22′07.6″E

Geography
- Location within Switzerland
- Location: Bern/Nidwalden/Obwalden, Switzerland
- Parent range: Urner Alps

The Graustock is a mountain of the Urner Alps, located south of Engelberg in Central Switzerland. The summit is one of the two tripoints between the cantons of Bern, Nidwalden and Obwalden (the other being the Jochstock).

On the north side of the mountain lies the Trüebsee.
