= Wellhorn =

Mountain in Switzerland

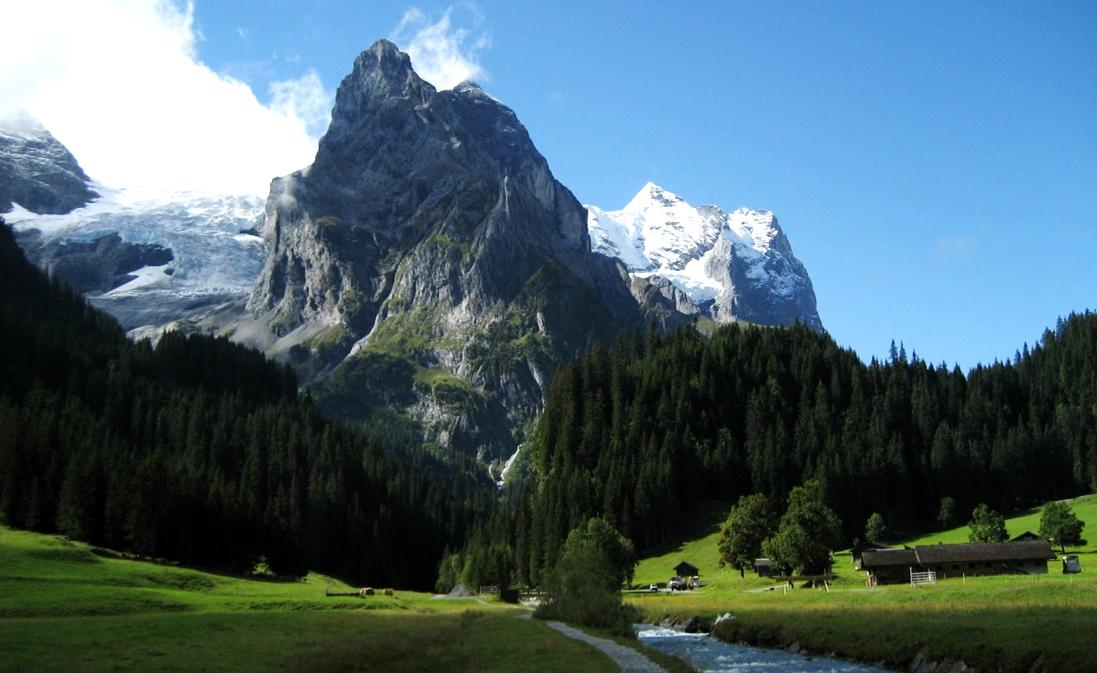
- The Wellhorn (middle) with the seemingly higher Klein Wellhorn (2,701 m) to its left, the Rosenlaui Glacier (left) and the Wetterhorn (right)

Highest point
- Elevation: 3,191 m (10,469 ft)
- Prominence: 240 m (790 ft)
- Parent peak: Finsteraarhorn
- Coordinates: 46°39′20.7″N 8°8′31.3″E

Geography
- Location within Switzerland
- Location: Bern, Switzerland
- Parent range: Bernese Alps

The Wellhorn is a mountain of the Bernese Alps, overlooking Rosenlaui in the Bernese Oberland. On its eastern side is the Rosenlaui Glacier.
