= Rosenlaui Glacier =

Glacier in Switzerland

- Rosenlauigletscher
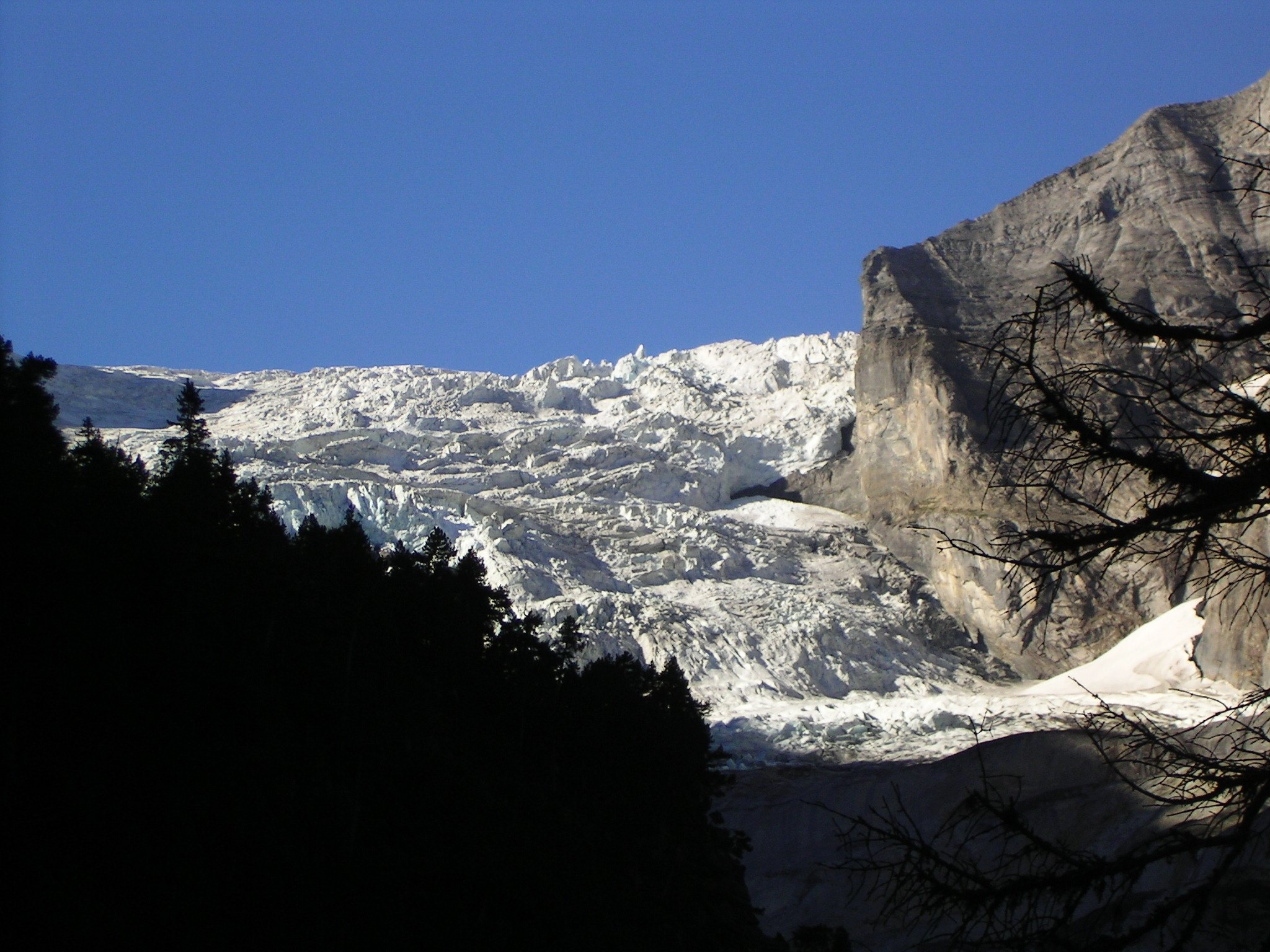
- Interactive map of Rosenlaui Glacier
- Location: Canton of Bern, Switzerland
- Coordinates: 46°39′0″N 8°9′13″E
- Length: 5 km

The Rosenlaui Glacier (German: Rosenlauigletscher) is a 5-km-long glacier (as of 2005) in the Bernese Alps in the canton of Bern in Switzerland. In 1973 it had an area of 6.14 km^{2}.

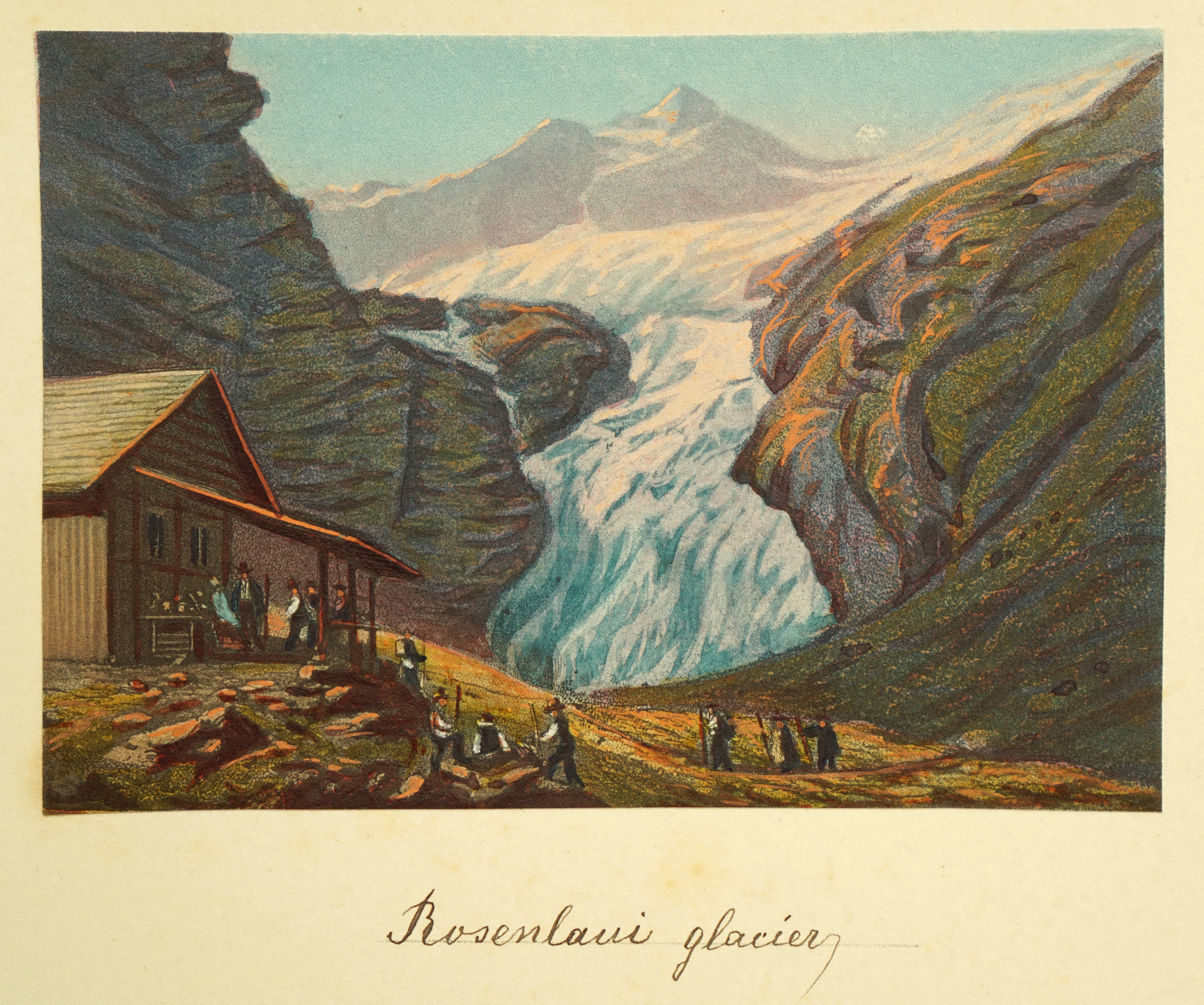
Rosenlaui Glacier c. 1870/80. Etching by Heinrich Müller

== See also ==
- List of glaciers in Switzerland
- Swiss Alps
