= Name of Sweden =

In Modern English, the name of Sweden (Swedish: Sverige [ˈsvæ̌rjɛ]) is derived from 17th century Middle Dutch and Middle Low German. In Old English, the country was named Swēoland (literally "Swede land") and Swēorīċe (literally "Swede kingdom"); the latter is cognate with Old Norse Svíaríki. Anglo-Norman of the 12th and 13th centuries used Suane and Swane (with the adjective as Suaneis). In Scots, Swane and Swaine appear in the 16th century. Early Modern English used Swedeland.

The Old English name for Sweden was Swēoland or Swēorīċe, land or kingdom of the Swēon, whereas the Germanic tribe of the Swedes was called Svíþjóð in Old Norse. The latter is a compositum consisting of Sví which means Swedish and þjóð which means people. The word þjóð has its origin in the elder Indo-European word teuteh.

The name of the Sviar is derived from a self-designation containing the Germanic reflexive *s(w)e "one's own" or "self".

== Sweden ==
The Modern English name Sweden was loaned from Dutch. Before the gradual introduction of Sweden in the 17th century, English used Swedeland or Sweathland.

It is based on Middle Dutch Zweden, the Dutch name of Sweden, and in origin the dative plural of Zwede "Swede". It has been in use in English from about 1600, first recorded in Scottish Swethin, Swadne. Country names based on a dative plural in -n became productive in German and Dutch in the 15th century; compare German Italien "Italy", Spanien "Spain", Rumänien "Romania", Ungarn "Hungary".

Outside of Dutch (Zweden), German (Schweden), and English, the name Sweden has also been adopted in Welsh. The English form in -n has also influenced several non-European languages, including Japanese スウェーデン (Suwēden), South Korean 스웨덴 (Seuweden), Hindi स्वीडन (Svīḍan), Bangla সুইডেন (Śuiḍen), Yoruba Swídìn and the Chinese rendition 瑞典 (Southern Min Sūi-tián, Cantonese seoi6 din2), and via the Chinese Hanzi spelling various other languages in the larger Sinosphere (such as Mandarin Ruìdiǎn, Vietnamese Thụy Điển, etc.).

== Sverige ==
In Sweden, the form Swerike is attested from the end of the 13th century, Svearike, from the 14th century, as well as the Icelandic Svíaríki and the Old Gutnish Suiariki.

In those days the meaning was restricted to the older Swedish region in Svealand and did not always include Götaland, the land of the Geats. The word rike translates to "realm" and also appears in the name of the legislature, Riksdag (cf. Danish rigsdag, German Reichstag).

Towards the end of the 15th century, the form had changed to Swerighe in Swedish, like baker ("baker") to bager is and mik ("me") to mig. This was due to a linguistic sound change. 17th-century spellings include Swerghe, Swirghe, Swirge.

Much is made about the difference between the medieval forms Svearike and Sverige. Medieval Swedes, though, were unlikely to see it as anything else but a matter of pronunciation.

== Names in Finnic languages ==
A naming that stems from a completely different root is the one used in some Finnic languages, in Finnish Ruotsi, in Estonian Rootsi, in Northern Sami Ruoŧŧa, probably derived from various uses of rōþs-, i.e., "related to rowing" in Old Swedish, cf. Rus, probably through the old name of the coast of North Svealand, Roslagen, and to the fact that before sailboats were established in the Baltic Sea, row boats were used to traverse it. The etymology of the name shares the same root as the name Russia.

== Names in other languages ==
The name of Sweden was Latinized as Suecia adopted in various Romance and Slavic languages, including Spanish Suecia, Catalan Suècia, Portuguese Suécia, Bulgarian Швеция Shvetsiya, and in non-European languages influenced by such languages, In these languages, there is frequent confusion between the names of Sweden and of Switzerland (Spanish Suiza, Catalan Suïssa, Portuguese Suíça, Bulgarian Shveytsariya). There is a historical tradition going back to at least the 15th century to the effect that Schwyz (the settlement which gave its name to Switzerland) was indeed named after the Swedes. Ericus Olai in his Chronica regni Gothorum (c. 1470) notes the similarity in toponymy, Swycia, quasi Suecia. This tradition was taken seriously in 19th-century scholarly reception of the Swiss Swedish origin legend, especially in Swedish romantic nationalism (e.g. Erik Gustaf Geijer's 1836 History of the Swedes), but is now considered unlikely.

Chinese uses 瑞典 to represent a phonetic approximation of the name (Early 20th century Mandarin: Shuì Diǎn, Modern Mandarin Ruì Diǎn, Cantonese Seoi^{6}Din^{2}.). Also in China, there has been frequent confusion with the name of Switzerland (Both Mandarin and Cantonese names beginning with the same character 瑞 ruì (meaning "auspicious"), to the point where the Swiss and Swedish consulates in Shanghai launched a campaign to help Chinese tourists distinguish between the two countries in 2013.)

In Arabic, the name is rendered as Suwayd سويد, the pertaining adjective being سويدي suwaydī "Swedish", which happens to form a homonym with a pre-existing Arabic name Suwayd "black, dark, swarthy" (cf. Sudan) and the nisba pre-existing in various parts of the Arab world (such as Riyadh's as-Suwaidi district).

== See also ==
- List of country-name etymologies
- List of etymologies of administrative divisions § Sweden (historical provinces, and counties)
- Rus' (name)
