= Deutsche Sagen =

Publication by the Brothers Grimm

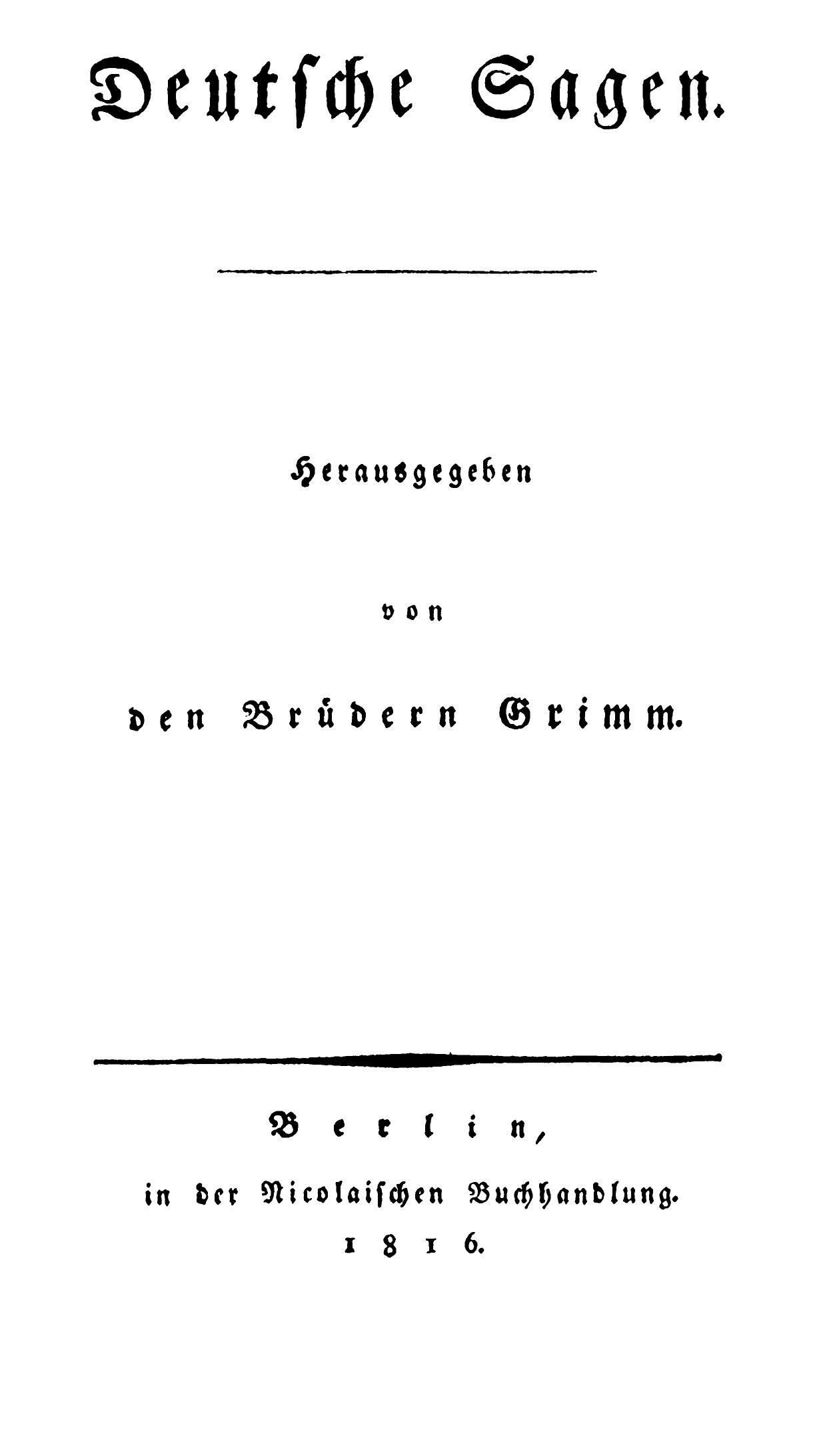
Title page of the first edition

Deutsche Sagen ("German Legends") is a publication by the Brothers Grimm, appearing in two volumes in 1816 and 1818. The collection includes 579 short summaries of German folk tales and legends (where "German" refers not just to German-speaking Europe generally but includes early Germanic history as well).

Deutsche Sagen followed the 1812 publication of Kinder- und Hausmärchen (known in English as Grimms' Fairy Tales). It never gained the wide popular appeal and influence of the latter, although it did influence the scholarly study of folk narrative.

The first volume contains 362 short tales, provided in short summary with a source. The source is in some cases "oral", with the region where it was collected (as in no. 1, Die drei Bergleute im Kuttenberg "the three miners in Kuttenberg", marked "oral" from Hessen), in other cases with a reference to the tale's previous publication (as in no. 362, Die drei Alten "The three old men", attributed to "Schmidt aus Lübek", im Freimüthigen 1809. Nr. 1.) The tales of the first volume tend to blend common concerns of the poor and working classes with magical realism including the attainment of wealth and status, and includes references to Frau Holle, the Wild Hunt, ghostly apparitions, and magic, the devil, dwarves, giants, kobolds, nixes, etc. Less than a dozen folk tales contain the German word for witch or witchcraft (hexen) but there are many mentions of the devil and one tale (#120) also mentions an old woman that was a magician or sorceress (ein altes Weib, das eine Zauberin war).

The second volume (entries numbered 363–579) focusses on historical legends, including numerous translations from Latin sources pertaining to Germanic antiquity, beginning with Tacitus (no 363. Der heilige Salzfluß "the sacred salt-river", Annales XIII. 57), spanning both medieval legend (e.g. no. 576. Hungersnoth im Grabfeld "famine in Grabfeld", Annales Fuldenses ad ann. 850) and early modern folkloristic records (e.g. no. 579 Die Gräfin von Orlamünde "the countess of Orlamünde", attributed to Wolfgang Lazius de migratione gentium libri VII in the edition of Waldenfels, antiquitatis selectae libri XII 1677, 4.465-474), blurring the lines between oral folk tradition and literary tradition.

Numbers 505–514 group a number of Swiss entries, including Radbot von Habsburg (505), Rudolf von Strättlingen (506), Idda von Toggenburg (507), Auswanderung der Schweizer (508), Der Bund im Rütli (511) and Wilhelm Tell (512).

A number of the stories record medieval antisemitic beliefs held by Germanic-speaking peoples. For example, The Jews' Stone, The Girl Who Was Killed by Jews, and Pfefferkorn the Jew at Halle, among others.

A few of the tales were translated in the nineteenth century: twelve by Thomas Roscoe (1826), nineteen by Thomas Keightley (1828), three by Thomas Crofton Croker (1828), ten by William Thoms (1834), one by Joseph Snowe (1839), and fourteen in Blackwood's Magazine (1844), but the first full translation into English was Donald J. Ward's The German Legends of the Brothers Grimm (1979). The original German collection is also freely available online.

== See also ==
- German folklore
- Austrian folklore
- Swiss folklore
