= Oberhasli =

Oberhasli: Haslital; Historically: Hasele, Hasly im Wyssland
- Talschaft
- Flag Coat of arms

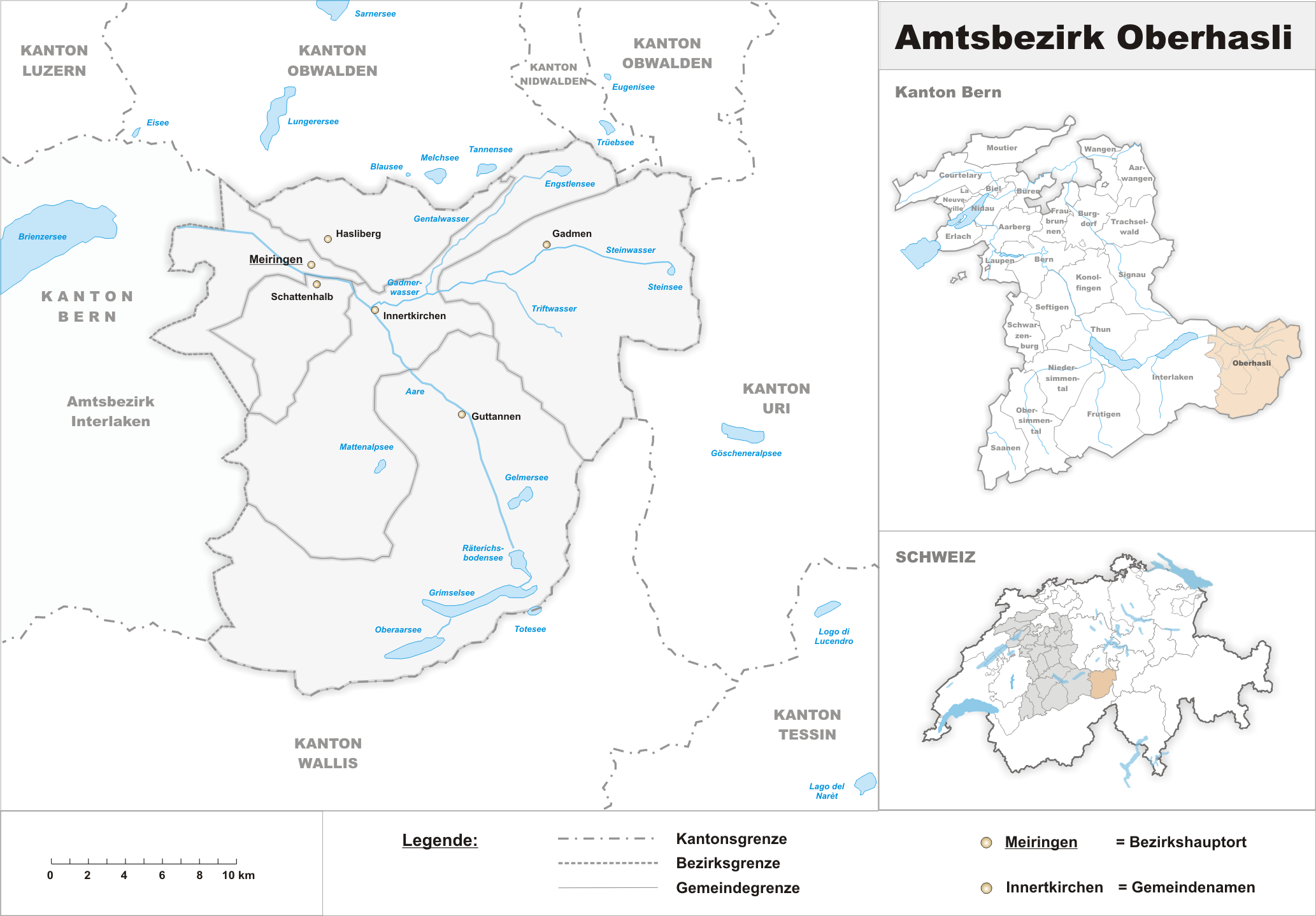
- Country: Switzerland
- Canton: Bern
- Region: Interlaken-Oberhasli

Area
  - Total: 551 km^{2} (213 sq mi)

Population (2007)
  - Total: 7,843
  - Density: 14.2/km^{2} (36.9/sq mi)
- Time zone: UTC+1 (CET)
  - Summer (DST): UTC+2 (CEST)
- Municipalities: 6

The Oberhasli is a historical Landvogtei or Talschaft in the Bernese Highlands, Switzerland, bordering on the cantons of Obwalden (OW), Nidwalden (NW), Uri (UR) and Wallis (VS).

From 1833 to 2009, Oberhasli was incorporated as the Oberhasli district, the easternmost of the 26 districts of the canton of Bern, bordering the district of Interlaken to the west. Since 2010, Oberhasli and Interlaken have been administratively united as the administrative district Interlaken-Oberhasli. The local dialect is of the Highest Alemannic variety.

With its area of 551 km^{2}, it is larger than the canton of Basel-Landschaft. It consists of the six municipalities of Gadmen, Guttannen, Hasliberg, Innertkirchen, Meiringen and Schattenhalb, with a total population of just below 8,000, corresponding to a population density of less than 15/km^{2} (compared to a Swiss average of 181/km^{2}), due to a significant portion of the area of Oberhasli being uninhabitable High Alps.

Haslital is used to refer to the entire region, but as a geographical term the Haslital proper is the main upper Aare valley, not including the many side valleys, such as Gadmertal, Ürbachtal, Gental and Reichenbachtal. The name Haslital is first attested in 1234. The prefix Ober- ("Upper Hasli") first appears in the 16th century for disambiguation with Hasle bei Burgdorf, Oberhasli is in official use since 1798. The origin of the name is likely Old High German hasal "hazel".

The upper parts of the Haslital are part of the World Heritage Site of the Jungfrau–Aletsch–Bietschhorn as defined in 2007.

== Geography ==
Oberhasli has historically been of great strategical significance due to its central location in the Central Alps, commanding several passes. Among them are:

- The Grimsel Pass to the south connecting to the Goms of the Upper Valais (VS).
- The Susten Pass to the east connection with the connecting with the valley of the Alpine Reuss (UR), the northern part of the St. Gotthard Route.
- The Joch Pass to the northeast at the beginning of the Gental, a foot pass west of the Titlis connecting to the canton of Nidwalden and further down to the resort Engelberg in the canton of Obwalden.
- The low Brünig Pass to the north connects Meiringen and the Haslital with the upper canton of Obwalden and further down to rest of Central Switzerland, such as Lucerne (LU).
- And the Grosse Scheidegg, a pass in the southwest with a direct connection to Grindelwald.

Besides the main valley, the Haslital, which includes the alluvial plain of the Aare between Meiringen and Lake Brienz, there are several lateral valleys. Among them are:

- The proper Haslital starts at the Grimselpass and the outflow of the Aare at the Grimselsee, respectively. The upper part of the valley is still quite narrow and secluded and stretches as far as Innertkirchen, where the Aare meets the Ürbachwasser of the Ürbachtal from the west, and the Gadmerwasser of the Gadmertal from the east. Then the Aare runs through the Aareschlucht after which it opens to the alluvial plain just before Meiringen where it mainly turns west, and after about 13 kilometres (8.1 mi) it enters Lake Brienz at its most eastern end.
- The Ürbachtal has the form of a large 'S' before it enters the Haslital just before Innertkirchen. The Gauligletscher is endorsed in a funnel between the Hangendgletscherhorn, Bärglistock, and Ewigschneehorn. It enters its water into the Gaulisee, which also collects its waters from the Grienbergligletscher, the Hienderstock, Bächlistock, and the Hiendertelttihorn. After the Gaulischafberg cliffs, the water flows into the Mattenalpsee. It also collects the water from Steinlouwihore and the Ritzlihore. Now the Ürbachwasser turns west and enters the proper Ürbachtal on a lower level between the Gallouwisteck to the east and the Dossen to the west. The water turns slowly east again below the impressive range called Englehörner (Angel's cones) in the east. And after a drop of about 200m the Ürbachwasser enters the Aare just before Innetrkirchen from the left.
- the Gadmertal starts at two places: One arm lies right below and south of the Titlis and north of the Fünffingerstöck. Here, the Wendengletscher drains its water into the Wendenwasser. South of the Five Finger Stock the Susten Pass connects Uri with the Bernese Highlands. South of it the Steingletscher below the Sustenhorn drains its water into the Steisee, which poors it into the Steinwasser. Steinwasser and the Wendenwasser both flow westward and converge below the Wendenstöcke in the north to the Gadmerwasser, 1.5 km before Gadmen. 3 km more west of it, the Gadmerwasser collects the water from the Triftwasser, which starts in the south below the extensive Triftgletscher. Another 4 km downwards, the Gental enters into the Gadmertal, and the Gentalwasser flows into the Gadmerwasser, just 3 km before it flows into the Aare in Innertkirchen.
- The Gental starts at the Engstlenalp below the Jochpass in the northeast, west of the Titlis, north of the Wendenstöcke and with a connection to the Melchsee-Frutt (OW) in the west. The Gentalwasser drains from the Engstlensee in southeastern direction in order to enter the Gamdertal downwards south of the Rothorn, which divides also the Melchsee-Frutt (OW) from the Mägisalp (BE) above Meiringen.
- the Reichenbachtal connects Meiringen with Grindelwald. The Reichenbach runs through it and forms the cataract Reichenbach Falls before joining the Aare at Meiringen. The Reichenbachtal is separated from the Ürbachtal by the Engelhörner in the south. The Schwarzhoren, the Wildgärst, and the Wandelhoren peaks dominate the picture to the north.

== History ==
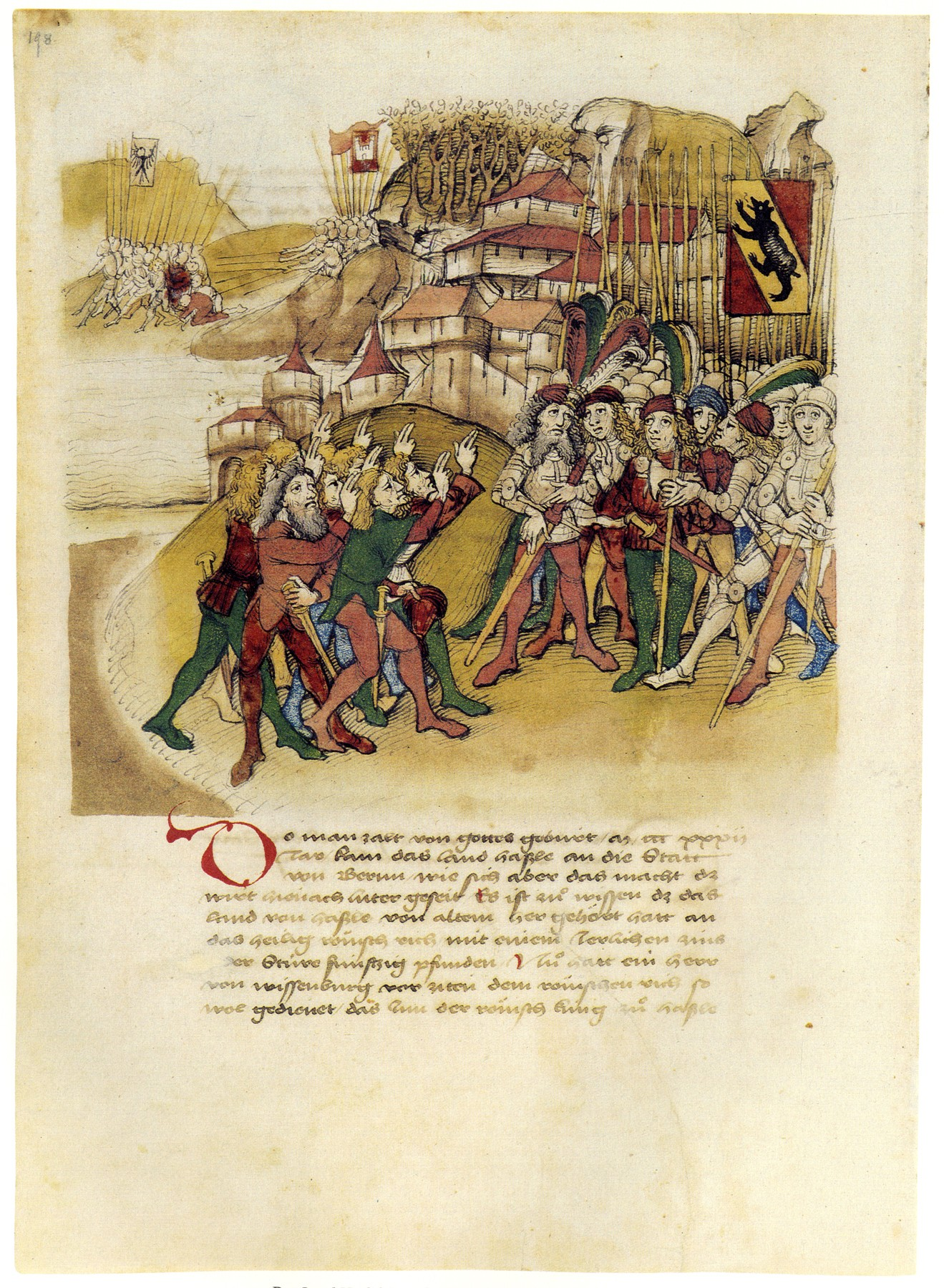
The people of Hasle swear allegiance to Bern in 1334 (depiction in the Spiezer Schilling, 1480s).

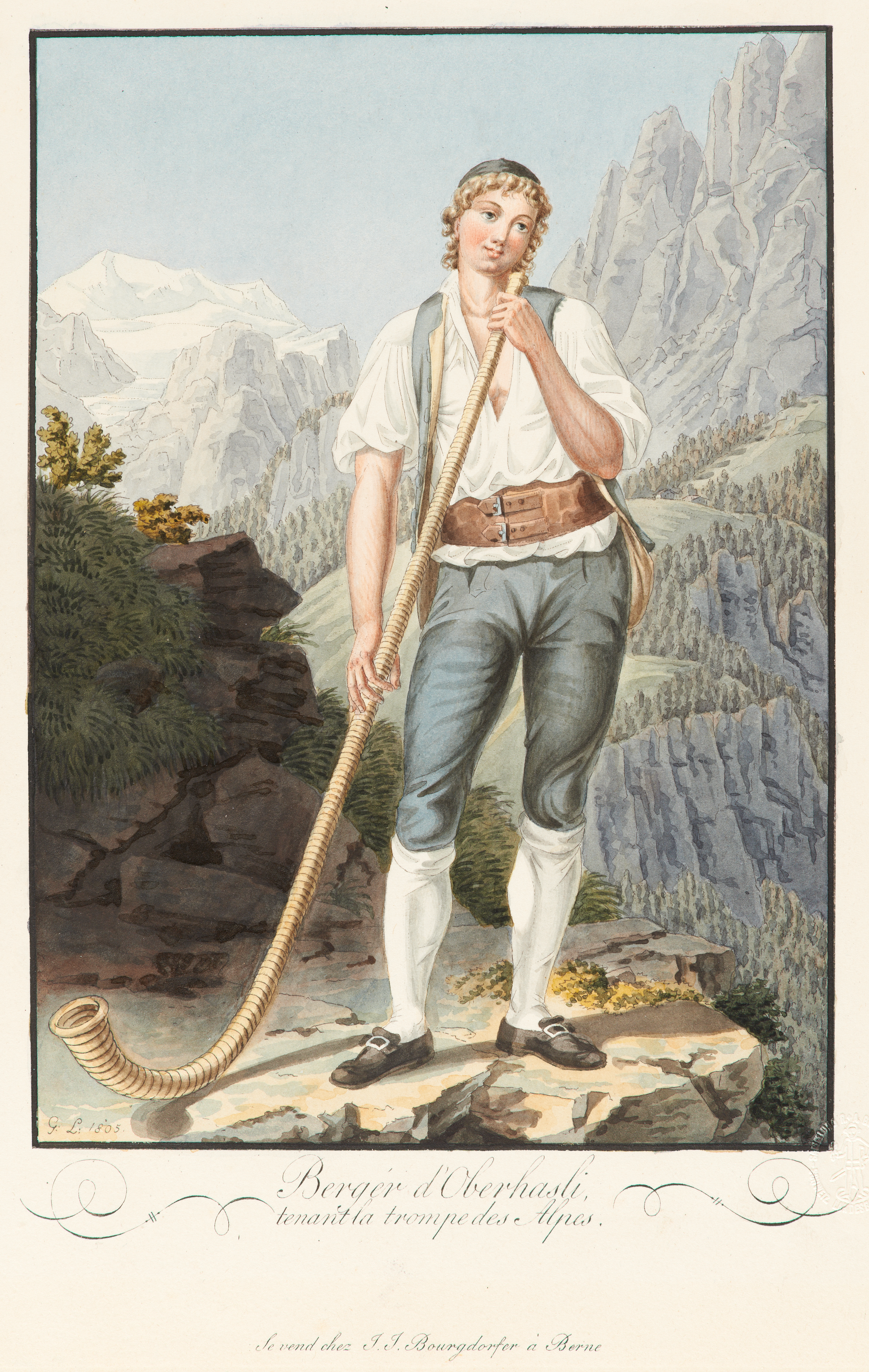
"Oberhasli shepherd" by Gabriel Lory (père) (1825)

Hasli has a particularly strong tradition of independence, even within Switzerland. It was de facto self-governing from its first settlement in the early medieval period (according to legend by "Swedes and Frisians") until its incorporation into the Helvetic Republic in 1798. It was nominally part of the Holy Roman Empire as an imperial bailiwick until 1334, and from 1334 to 1798 a nominal subject of Berne, but remained effectively self-governed with the exception of the forced imposition of the Reformation during 1528–1557.

In 1234 the bailiwick of Meiringen, which included all of Haslital, is recorded as reichsfrei. Hasli remained an imperial bailiwick until its acquisition by Berne in 1334. Meiringen church is elevated built on top of a number of predecessor buildings, the oldest is estimated to date to the 9th or 10th century. The rights to the parish were given to Seedorf Abbey by Henry (VII) of Germany in 1234. They were acquired by Interlaken Monastery in 1272.

In 1275, Hasli formed an alliance with the city of Bern. In 1311, Oberhasli was given to the house of Weissenburg by Henry VII. After an unsuccessful revolt in 1334, Oberhasli passed to the city of Bern as a subject territory in name but regained most of its earlier privileges. Bern was careful to appoint men native to Hasli to administrative posts and as judges. Oberhasli proved an important ally to Bern militarily. In 1339, Oberhasli provided a force of 300 men participating in the Battle of Laupen. The arrangement of Oberhasli as a nominal subject territory with de facto self-governance endured until 1528, when Bern enforced the Protestant confession in Oberhasli. About half of the population of Oberhasli participated in an armed revolt against Bern. After this, Bern tried to enforce Bernese administration in Oberhasli, but met such resistance that in a 1557 treaty the old privileges were re-instated.

In the 17th to 18th century, an upper class of influential families native to Oberhasli emerged, the so-called Ehrbarkeit. Before the introduction of a separate parish in Innertkirchein in 1709, there was a single parish in Meiringen for all of Oberhasli. In the 19th century, parishes in Gadmen (1808) and Guttannen (1816) followed.

In 1558, there were 253 hearths (households) registered in Oberhasli, in 1653 the number had grown to 360. In 1669, population had declined to ca. 500 individuals following an outbreak of plague. Parts of Haslital were affected by the Evangelical Awakening of the 1730s.

In 1764, there were 3,253 inhabitants, and population more than doubled over the following century, to 7,054 in 1850. During the existence of the Helvetic Republic, Oberhasli was part of the Kanton Oberland. Oberhasli was traditionally organized in fifteen collectives of independent farming estates, the so-called Bäuerten, between them forming the Talschaft of Oberhasli. This structure was replaced by the six municipalities of the Oberhasli district in 1834. From 1834 until 2009, Oberhasli formed a district of the canton of Bern. The sovereign law of Oberhasli (Landrecht) became inactive in 1843, during the Swiss Restauration.

Rapid population growth in the 19th century resulted in poverty, and forced emigration, primarily to America. From about 1880, economic recovery set in as Meiringen became a center of tourism. Population still declined from 7,574 in 1880 to 6,507 in 1920 (loss of employment in tourism during World War I) and began to rise again during the mid-to-late 20th century, to 7,878 in 1950 and 8,189 in 2000. It has slightly declined since, to 7,843 in 2007 and 7,824 in 2016. While total population has remained more or less stable since the mid-20th century, population distribution has shifted from the traditional dispersed settlement structure to the core settlement in Meiringen. Meiringen accounted for 30% of the population of Hasli in 1764 (33% in 1850), but for 60% as of 2016.

Oberhasli district was merged with Interlaken district in 2010 to form the new Interlaken-Oberhasli district. The population of Gadmen declined from 739 in 1850 to 250 in 2007, Gadmen municipality being merged into Innertkirchen in 2014.

Aerial view (1964)

== Administrative divisions ==
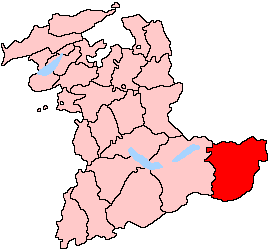
The Oberhasli district within the canton of Bern

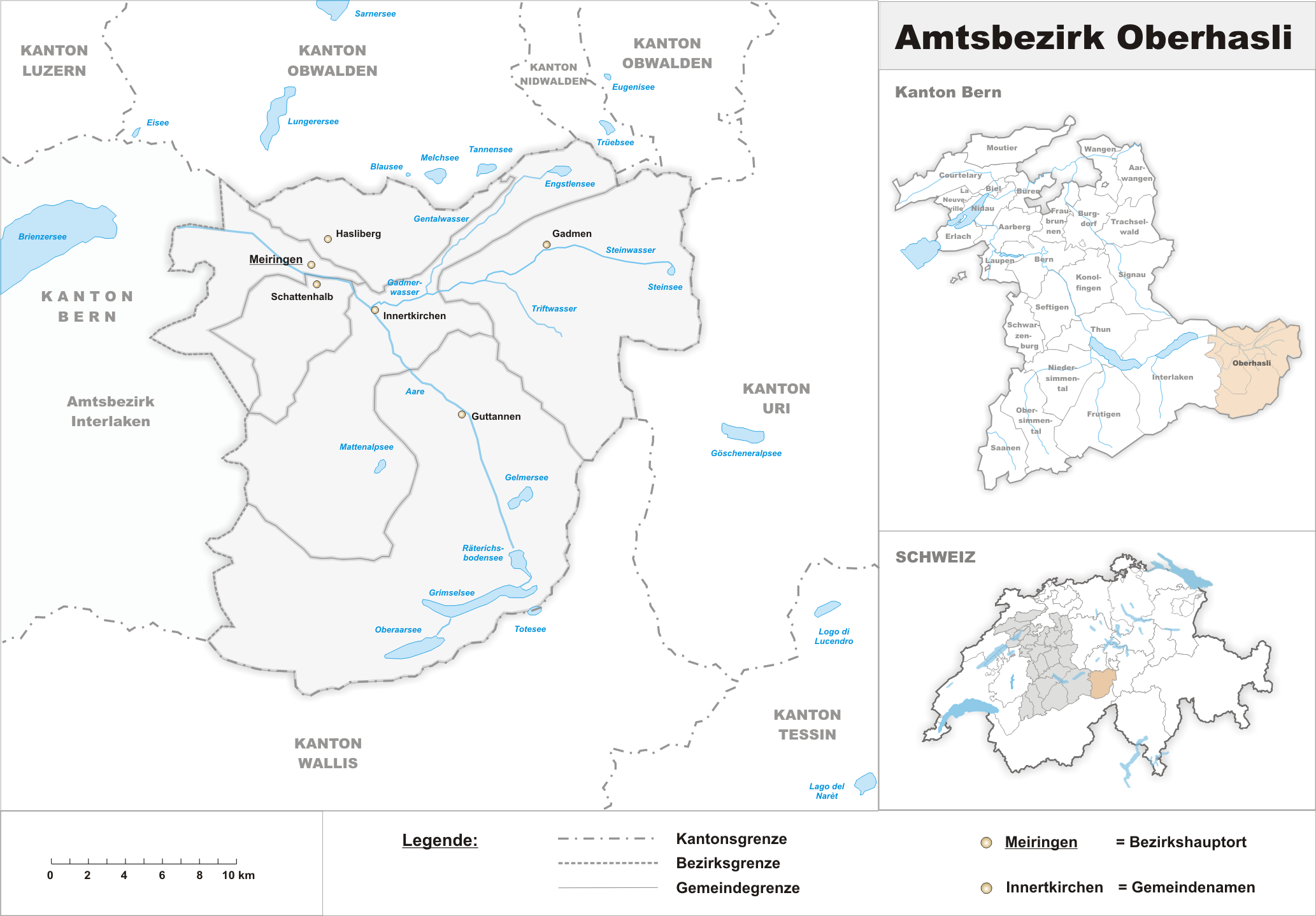
Map Oberhasli, with locator maps placing it within the canton of Bern and within Switzerland

The Oberhasli district is the easternmost of the 26 districts of the canton of Bern, from 1833 to 2009, encompassing an area of 550 km^{2}. The administrative capital is Meiringen. Oberhasli since 1843 comprised six municipalities, reduced to five in 2014 when Gadmen (population 250 as of 2007, area 116.4 km^{2}) was merged with Innertkirchen.

From 1 January 2010, the district lost its administrative power while being replaced by the Interlaken-Oberhasli (administrative district), whose administrative centre is Interlaken.

Since 2010, it remains therefore a fully recognised district under the law and the Constitution (Art.3 al.2) of the Canton of Berne.

municipality	population (2016)	area (km^{2}) (2016)
Meiringen	4,692	40.7
Hasliberg	1,193	41.7
Innertkirchen	1,087	236.6
Schattenhalb	585	31.5
Guttannen	267	200.7
Total	7,824	551

The black eagle on a golden field formerly represented the entire Talschaft of Oberhasli. It is the imperial coat of arms. The right to use of the Reichsadler as an at least formal claim of imperial immediacy was one of the special privileges granted to the people of Hasli by Berne. When municipal coats of arms were introduced, Meiringen insisted to retain the imperial coat of arms without modification, and other municipalities conceded by using the eagle in combination with other heraldic designs.

== Economy and infrastructure ==
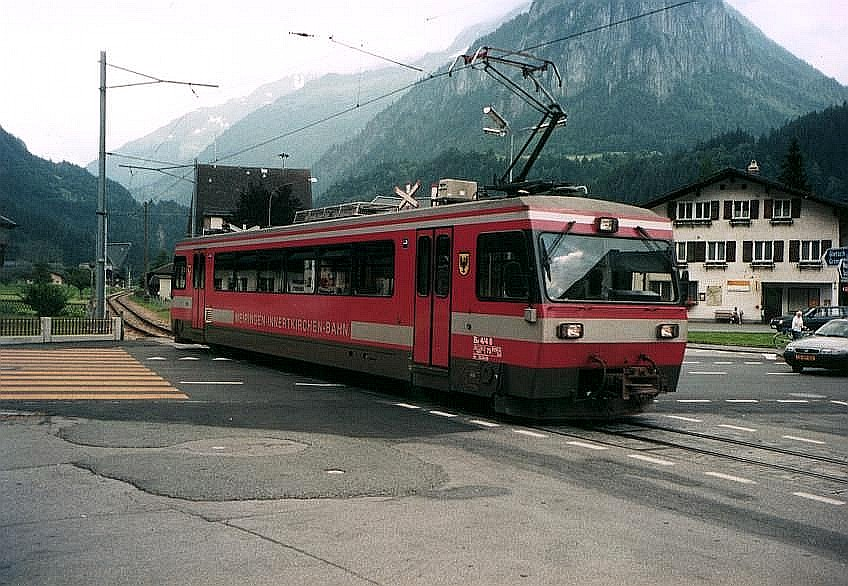
Meiringen-Innertkirchen-Bahn in Innertkirchen.

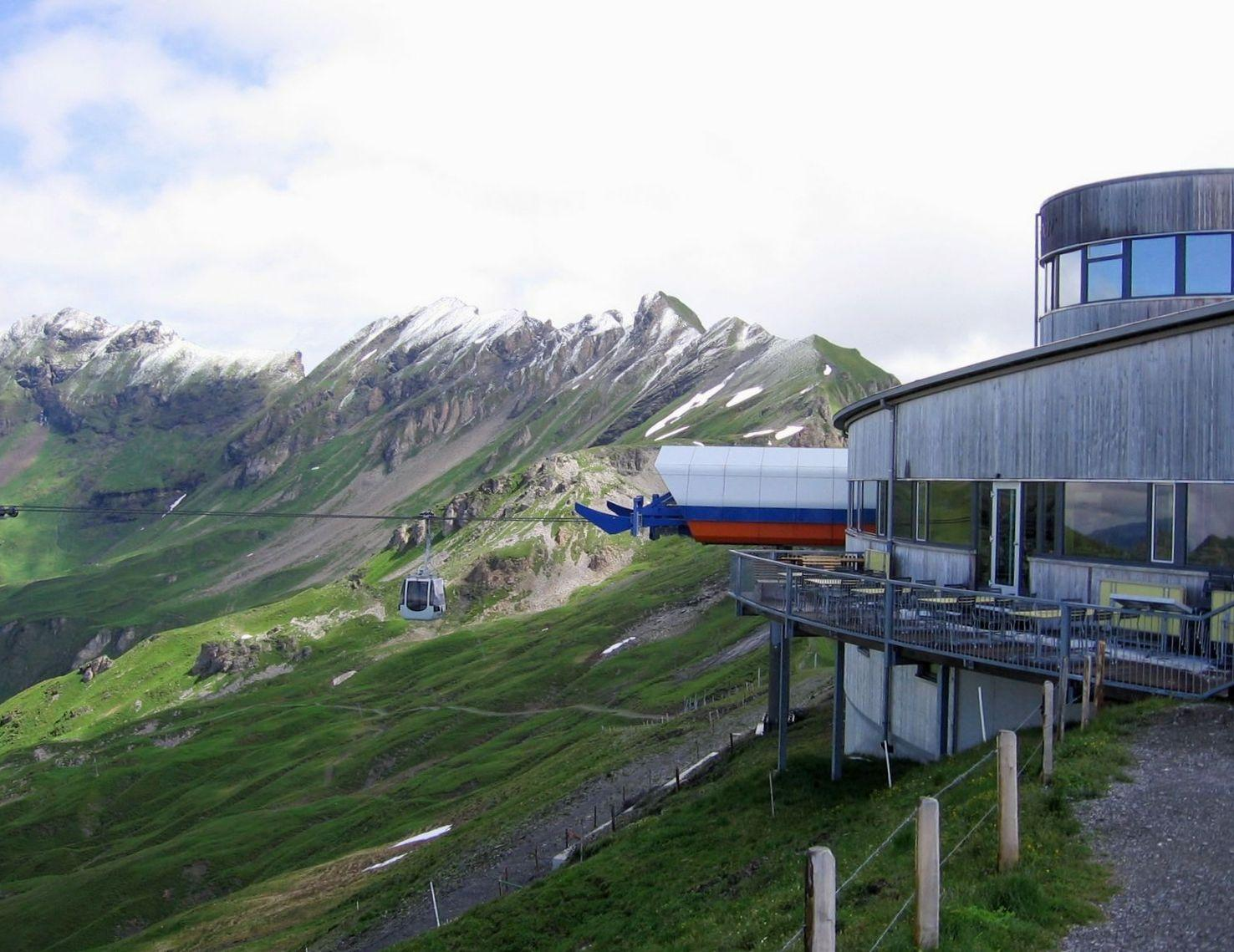
"Alpen tower" station and panorama restaurant.

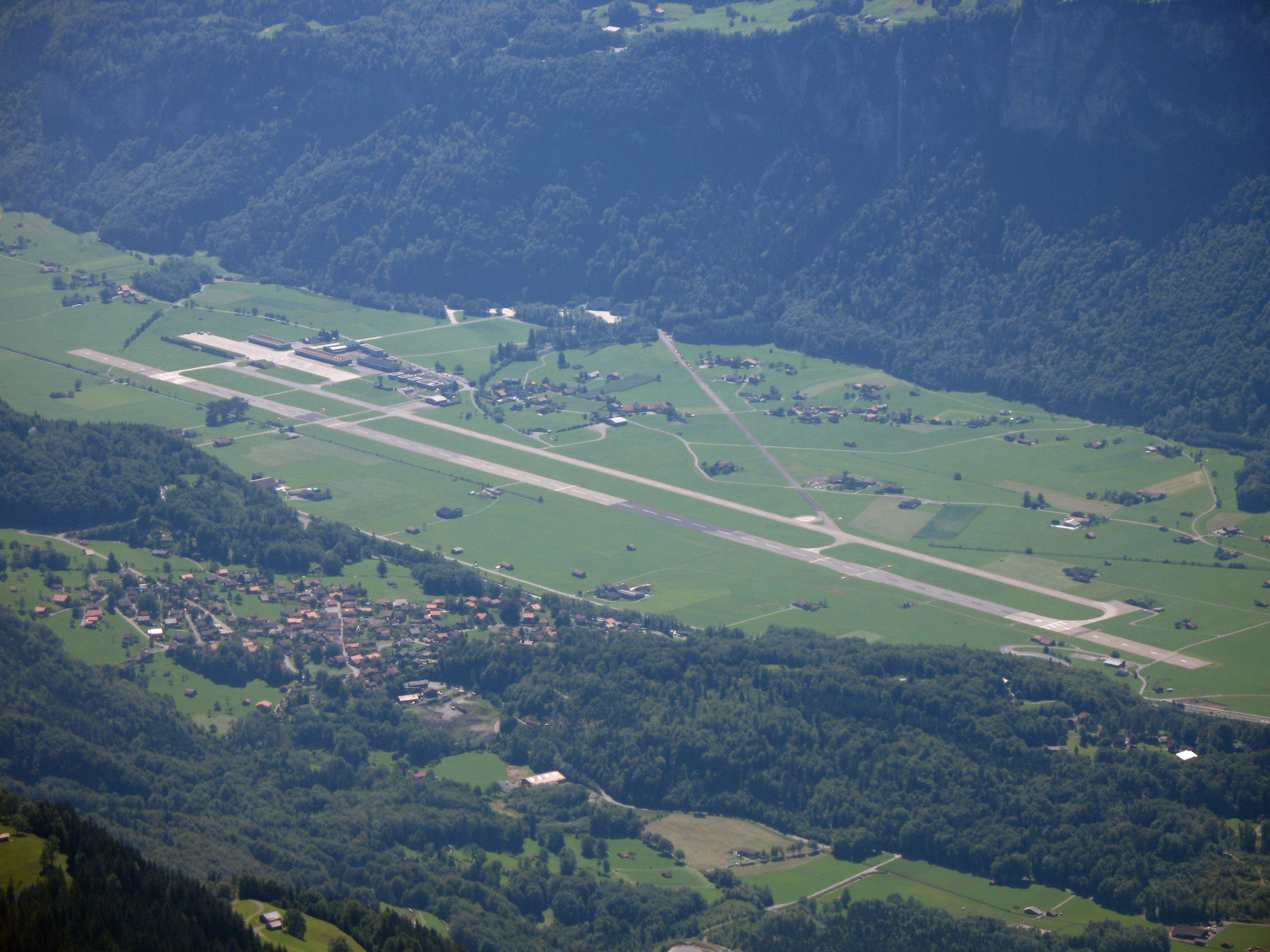
Meiringen airbase as seen from Brienzer Rothorn.

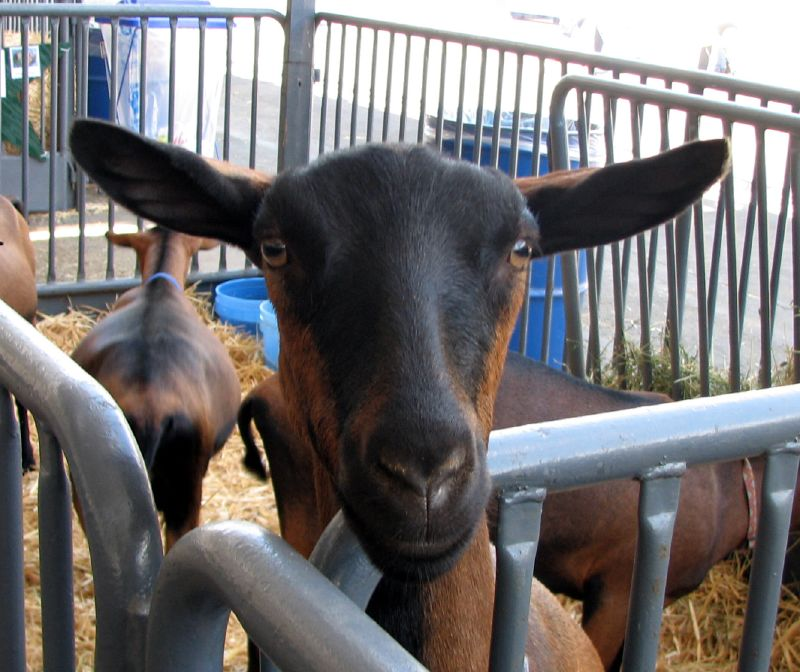
An Oberhasli goat.

The economy of Oberhasli was based on agriculture and transhumance (goats, sheep) in the Late Middle Ages, shifting to livestock breeding (cattle, horses) and cheese production during the Early Modern period.

Livestock and cheese was exported to Italy across the Grimsel and Nufenen passes.

In the 18th century, there were three yearly livestock markets. There was also some iron mining, beginning in the 15th century, and phased out after 1798. From the 17th century, there was rockhounding for crystals, intensified with the rise of tourism in the 19th century. Booming tourism triggered significant investments in structure, notably the Brünig road in 1857 and the Brünig railway in 1888, connecting Oberhasli to Lucerne via Obwalden, and from there to Greater Zürich and the Swiss plateau in general; the Grimsel road opened in 1894 and the Susten road in 1945. The number of hotels in Meiringen grew from two in 1831 to eighteen in 1900.

After 1973, additional infrastructure turned Hasliberg into a major skiing resort.

As of 2005, employment in the primary sector (agriculture) was down to below 20%, while the tertiary sector (mostly tourism) had risen to above 65%.

Another important branch of industry is the production of hydroelectricity, Kraftwerke Oberhasli AG currently producing about 1.1 GW or 12% of Swiss electricity consumption. The Swiss Air Force has an airbase in Unterbach, Meiringen municipality.

== Culture and folklore ==
Oberhasli is situated at the core of Highest Alemannic Alpine culture and preserves a number of elements typical of Swiss folklore.

Oberhasli became affected by the modern era comparatively late, in the second half of the 19th century with the booming of tourism in Switzerland, and it preserved a rich tradition of folklore into the 20th century.

The main yearly festival of Oberhasli is the Ubersitz (lit. the "sitting out" of the night drinking) culminating a week of Trychel marches in Meiringen.

In 1846, Johann Georg Kohl travelled to Oberhasli, describing both its natural landscape and its population. Kohl recorded a tradition claiming Scandinavian origin of the people of Oberhasli, telling of a march of 6,000 Frisians and Swedes exiled from their homes by a famine. The names of the leaders of the immigrating Swedes is reported as Restius and Hastus. Kohl describes the architecture of the Meiringen church as reminiscent of North Frisian and Scandinavian types. This legend was first recorded by Petermann Etterlin in his 1507 Chronicle.

The Oberhasli legend was received in Scandinavian Romantic nationalism, with e.g. Danish poet Adam Oehlenschläger publishing a poem Haslidalen in 1849.

A collection of folk tales was published in 1943 by Melchior Sooder (1885–1955), a teacher at Rohrbach and a native of Schattenhalb, as Zelleni us em Haslital. Dwarves figure prominently in these tales, with a dwarf king called Muggestutz. They also tell of the disappearance of the dwarves after their help was not appreciated by the people of Oberhasli. A grammar of the Hasli dialect was published by Hans Dauwalder (born 1925) in 1992.

== See also ==
- Highest Alemannic
- Walser
- Ubersitz
- History of the Alps
