= Swiss Swedish origin legend =

Legend of a population of Swedes and Frisians settling in the Swiss Alps

In legend and in the early historiography of Switzerland, there is an account of a migration of a population of Swedes and Frisians settling in the Swiss Alps, specifically in Schwyz and in Hasli (Schwedensage).

== Medieval legend ==
The legend is discussed in Ericus Olai’s Chronica regni Gothorum (c. 1470). Olai notes that the Swiss (Svitenses) claimed to be descended from “Swedes or Goths” (Sueci vel Gothi). He also observes the similarity in toponymy: Swycia, quasi Suecia (“Swycia, as if Sweden”). This is reflected in a late-15th-century gloss from Reichenau: Suecia, alias Helvicia, inde Helvici, id est Suetones (also known as Suiones) — that is, “Sweden, also known as Helvicia, hence the Helvici, that is, the Swedes.”

A near-contemporary record is that of Petermann Etterlin, who wrote in the 1470s (printed as Chronicle of the Swiss Confederation in 1507). Etterlin telling the legend refers to "the Swedes, who are now called the Switzer" (die Schwediger, so man yetz nempt Switzer) presents an eponymous founder, one Suit (Swit, Schwyt, Switer), leader of the migrating Swedes, who defeated his brother Scheyg in single combat in a dispute over leadership of the new settlement. He gives an account of their decision to settle on the site of Schwyz:

Also zugent sy gegen hôchen tütschen landen zuo, und kâment in gegne nit ferr von dem vinstren walde, das man yetz nennet zuo unser frowen zuo Einsidlen. Dâ liessent sy sich nider in einem tal heisset Brunnen, dâ gar nützet was anders dann ein hüpsche wilde, und was keine wonung nyenâ dâselbs umb, dann ein hüssle, dâ einer inne sass, der des fars wartet (dann es ist alwegen ein strâss und ein far daselbs gewesen): dâ wolttentz mornendes über sê gefaren sin, und dannent hin über die pirg und den Gotthart gen Rôm zuo. Alsô stuond in der nacht ein grûssamlicher ungehürer wind uff, des gelîchen vormâlen nyemer gesechen worden was, umb des willen sy nit ab stat komen möchtent. Dô giengent sy in den welden hin und har, besâhent die landtschaft und fundent dâ hübsch holz, frisch guot brunnen und ein toügenlîch gelegenheit, die, als sy bedûcht, wann es erbûwen wêr, irem lande in Swêden nit unglîch, und wurdent ye mit ein andren ze rât, dass sy da selbs wolten verharren und ein botschafft hinweg schicken, Soliche gegne und wilde von dem Riche ze entpfachent, als ouch beschach.	"So they travelled towards Upper Germany, and came to a land not far from the dark forest that is now known as Our Lady of Einsiedeln. There they settled in a valley called Brunnen, where there was nothing but a handsome wilderness, and there was no habitation anywhere around that place, other than a cottage, where one lived who was taking care of the ferry (as there had always been a road and a ferry in that place): there they planned to cross the lake in the morning, and from there across the mountains and Gotthard Pass towards Rome. But during the night a cruel and terrible wind rose, such as had never been seen before, because of which they could not move from the place. So they went walking to and fro in the woods and looked at the landscape, and they found there handsome woods, fresh and good wells and a suitable situation that, as they thought, if it would be cultivated would be not unlike their own lands in Sweden, and they agreed among themselves that they would dwell in that place and send a messenger asking to receive these lands and wilderness as imperial fief, as did in fact happen."

Etterlin's account is supposedly based on a "common Swiss chronicle" (Gesta Suitensium, gemeine Schwyzerchronik) also reflected in the White Book of Sarnen, Heinrich von Gundelfingen (Das Herkommen der Schwyzer und Oberhasler) and later by Aegidius Tschudi (Die Geschichte der Ostfriesen, Swedier und andre, so mit jnen gereisset, vnd wie Switer dem Lande den Namen Swiz gegeben). Etterlin presents the three Waldstätten as representing three different stocks or races, the people of Schwyz as the most recent immigrants (from Sweden), the people of Uri representing the original "Goths and Huns", and the people of Unterwalden representing "the Romans".

Henrich von Gundelfingen gives an elaborate version of the legend, stating the emigration from Sweden and Frisia was due to a famine, which was met by king "Cisbertus of Sweden" by a decree that every month, the lot should be drawn and one in ten men would be forced to emigrate with all his family and possessions. Heinrich is the origin of the figures of 6,000 Swedes and 1,200 Frisians taking part in the migration with a certain Suicerus as their leader.

The legend is also mentioned by Albrecht von Bonstetten, a monk in Einsiedeln abbey, in 1479 (Superius Germanie Confederationis descriptio). In this version, the toponym Schwyz derives from a Swedish founder named Switerus.

Sigismund Meisterlin (d. 1488) in his Chronicon Norimbergense claims the people of Schwyz as descendants of the Huns, with a leader called Swifter ruling the valley, while his brother Senner ruled the high pastures.

Records from the early 16th century confirm that the tradition was in fact part of local folklore (and not the result of learned etymological speculation); in an Urner Tellenspiel performed between 1511 and 1525, the identification of Gothic and Hunnic ancestry of Uri, Roman ancestry of Unterwalden and Swedish ancestry of Schwyz, and for the Landsgemeinde of Schwyz in 1531 we have the record of a performance of an Andacht der Altvorderen (remembrance of the forefathers) in memory of the Austreibung aus Schweden (eviction from Sweden) in times of famine.

The saga is also reflected in early-16th-century Frisian chronicles such as the Tractatus Alvinus, Jancko Douwama's Boeck der Partijen and subsequent writings, as well as in the biography of the condottiere Wilwolt von Schaumberg from Thuringia, who led the conquest of Frisia by Albert of Saxony in 1498. According to the latter, 'the Frisians, when they write to each other, even nowadays, call the Swiss "son" and the Swiss call the Frisians "cousin".'

The first critical evaluation of the story is that of Tschudi in 1570, who is unsure if he should reject the account of Kiburger wholesale, or if the tradition might have a historical source in the Cimbri of 114 BC (unlike his 19th-century successors, Tschudi does not consider the possibility of a Viking Age migration).

== Early Modern reception ==
Once the legend had been written down in the late 15th century Swiss chronicles it became a standard topos of the early modern historiography of Switzerland. The legend did remain current in the folklore of Schwyz and Hasli in the 19th century, no doubt reinforced by historiographical and literary tradition. Schiller's William Tell (1804) makes reference to the legend (act 2, scene 2), in the voice of Stauffacher. The Brothers Grimm included the legend in their Deutsche Sagen of 1818 (nr. 514 Auswanderung der Schweizer), and Ludwig Bechstein in his Deutsches Sagenbuch (1853) includes it as nr. 2 Des Schweizervolkes Ursprung ). In Sweden, Uppsala historian Jakob Ek published an account of the legend in De Colonia Suecorum in Helvetiam egressa (1797).

Johannes von Müller in 1780 accepted that the foundational population of Schwyz was a separate race (i.e. separate from that of Uri and Unterwalden) and argued that this was still visible in the "exceptionally handsome" population of Oberhasli and the neighbouring Bernese Oberland as well as of Entlebuch. Johann Georg Kohl (1849) also described the physiology of the people of Oberhasli as being of the Scandinavian type, as "remarkably tall, strong and blond".

Erik Gustaf Geijer in his History of the Swedes (1832–36) notes that the legend was now limited to the population of Haslidale but had once also been generally believed by the people of Schwyz. In this version, the Swedes march from a place called Hasle on the banks of the Rhine, defeating a Frankish army on the way, and settle in the alpine valleys because the landscape reminded them of their own country. Geijer adds his opinion that the events would fall into the "age of the northern expeditions" (i.e. the Viking Age) of the 9th century. He cites a Viking Age chronicle which relates that in 861 a Viking expedition ascended the Mosel and wintered in a fortified camp at a place called Haslow, defeated a Frankish army and moved onward pillaging along the Rhine. Geijer equates this expedition with one mentioned in Óláfs saga Tryggvasonar, in which the sons of Ragnar Lodbrok participated, advancing as far as Wiflisburg (Avenches) in Switzerland.

In 1846, Johann Georg Kohl travelled to Hasli, describing both its natural landscape and its population. Kohl recorded a tradition telling of a march of 6,000 Frisians and Swedes exiled from their homes by a famine. The names of the leaders of the immigrating Swedes is reported as Restius and Hastus. Kohl describes the architecture of the Meiringen church as reminiscent of North Frisian and Scandinavian types. The Hasli legend was received in Scandinavian Romantic nationalism, with e.g. Danish poet Adam Oehlenschläger publishing a poem Haslidalen in 1849.

== See also ==
- Historiography of Switzerland
- Name of Switzerland
- Name of Sweden
- Gutasaga
- Walser migrations
