= Guggenmusik =

Style of Germanic carnival marching band and music

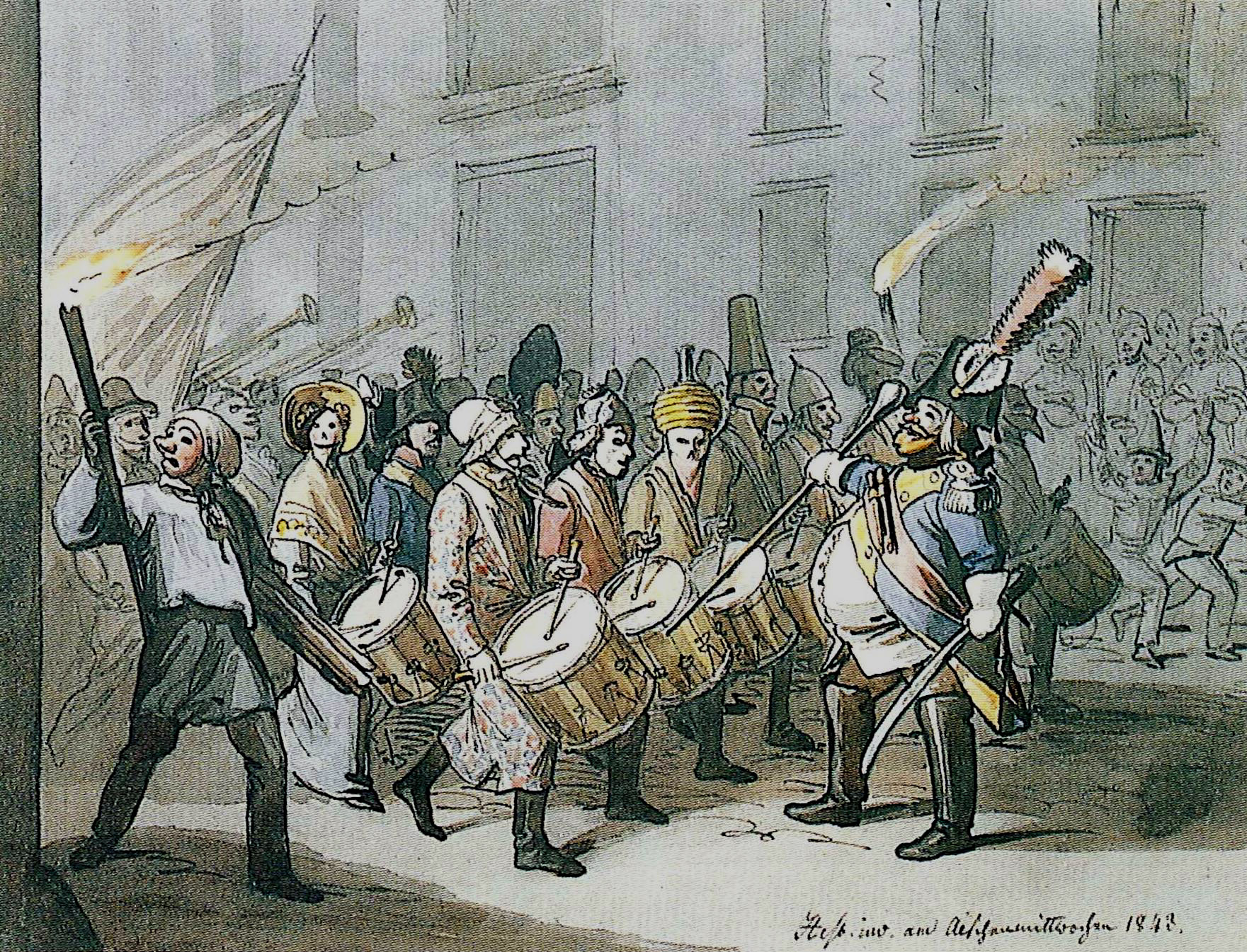
Morgenstreich celebrated at Basler Fasnacht (1843)

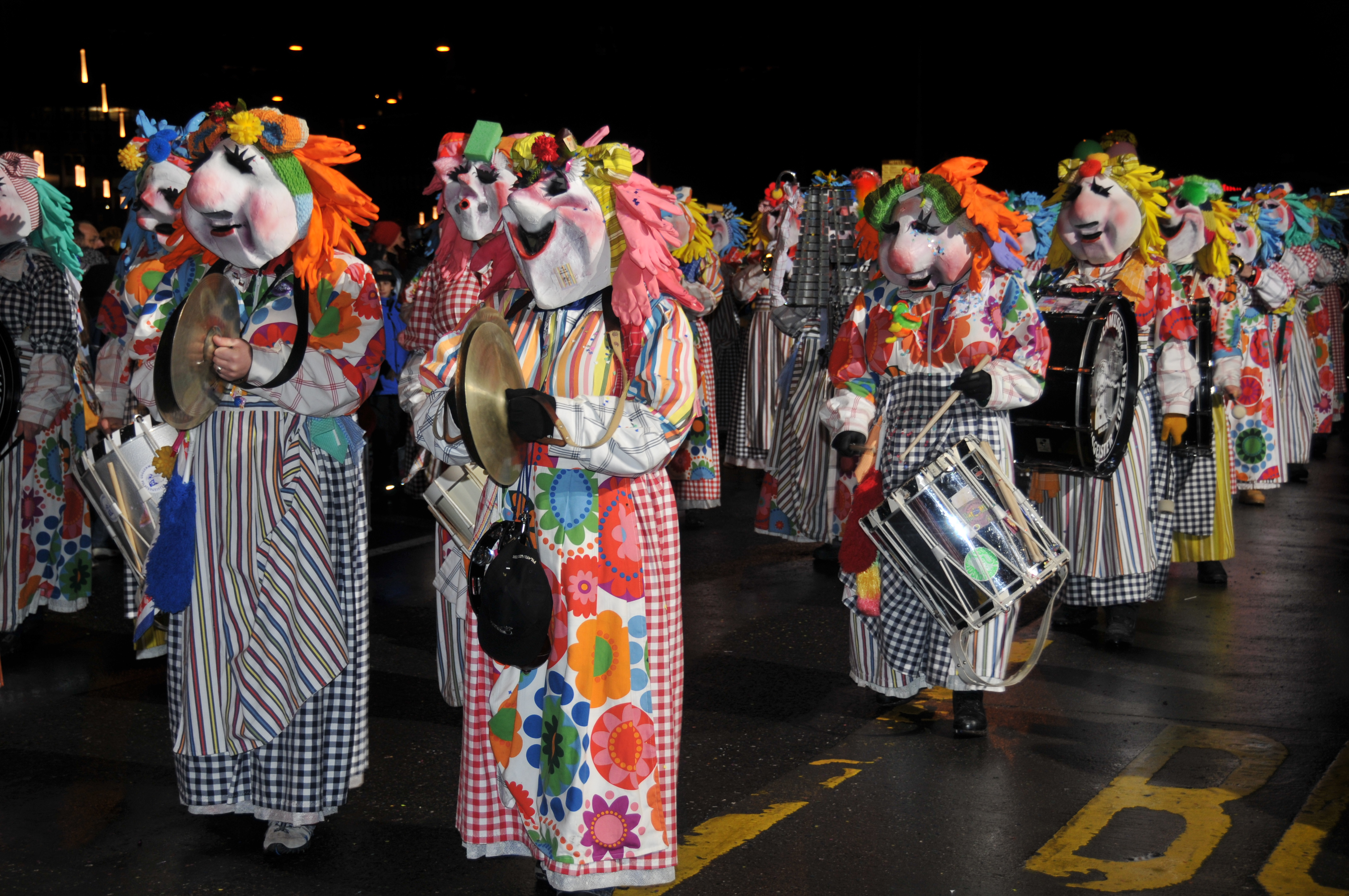
Carnival in Luzern

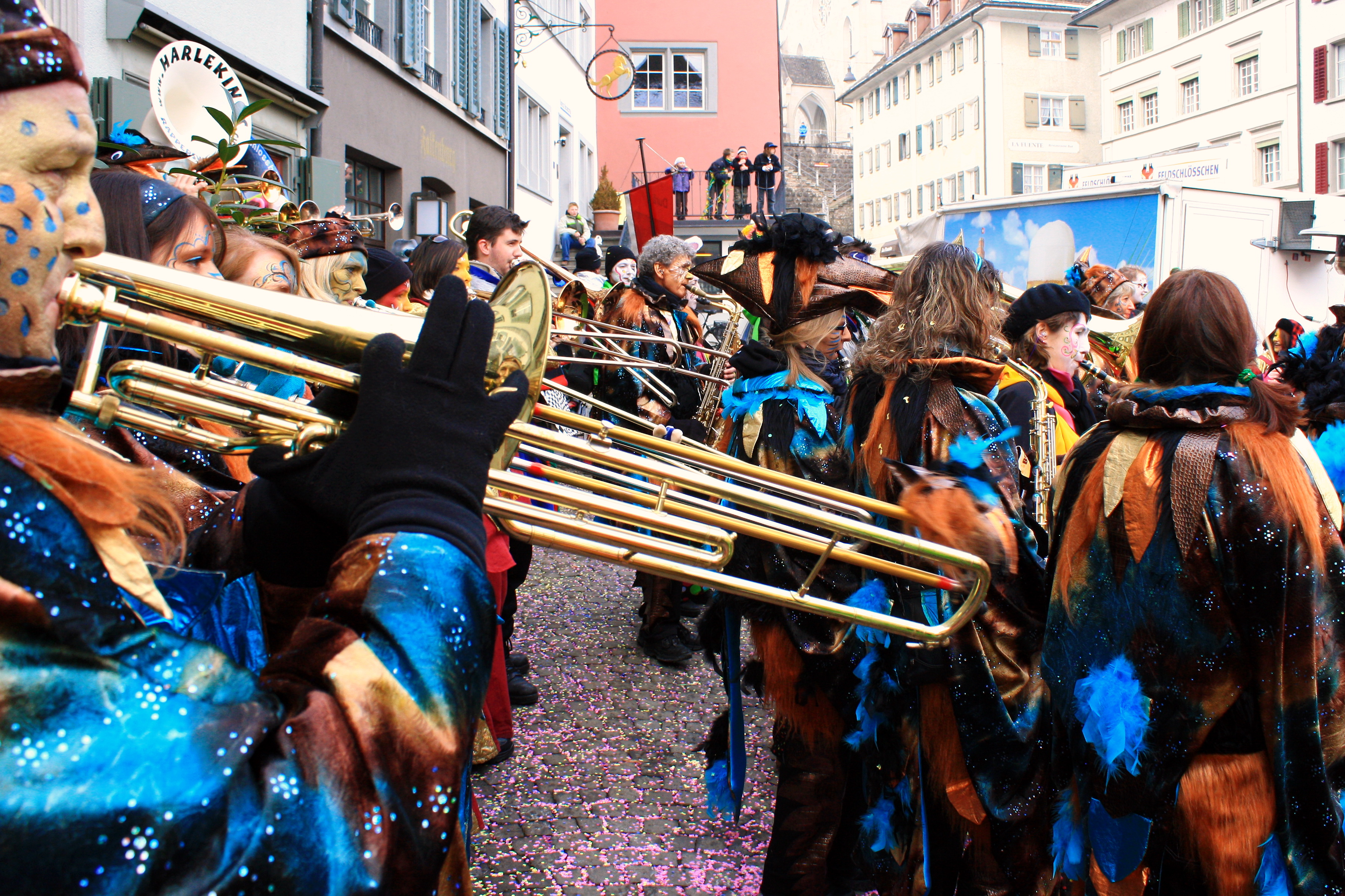
Eis-zwei-Geissebei in Rapperswil

Guggenmusik (also known as "Guggemoseg", "Guuggemusig" or "Chatzemusig") is a term widely used in the Alemannic region of Switzerland, Austria and southern Germany to designate both a Carnival marching band and the type of music it plays.

== Definition ==
Guggenmusik is played during Fasnacht, the Swabian-Alemannic carnival season (Swabian–Alemannic Fastnacht), which is celebrated in various localities as the Basler Fasnacht, Luzerner Fasnacht, Eis-zwei-Geissebei in Rapperswil, and many other terms. The most common explanation of the word "Gugge" is that it may derive from the Alemannic "Sack/Tüte", meaning "bag". Other unsourced explanations include the word used for a small children's trumpet, a (Swiss German) word for "scream", or the cuckoo's call. A "Guggemusik" band thus refers to a group of people playing loud music and typically wearing costumes and masks in a uniform style.

It is a strongly rhythmic music of distinctive style played with brass instruments, pipes and drums. Although melodies remain clearly recognizable, they are at times played "off-key", intentionally and often quite skillfully. Driven by a dominant rhythm section, the music sounds twisted and thrilling, very danceable and perfect for spontaneous street concerts during the "wild days" of Carnival. Today there are many types of Guggenmusik to inspire carnival celebrants. Bands usually play well-known pop songs but also folk tunes and children's music.

It is hard to arrive at a single definition of Guggenmusik, as various regions have their own carnival traditions. Besides the traditional brass instruments like trumpet, tuba, trombone, and/or sousaphone as well as drums, (though, specifically, they use drums on carts known as "Schlagzeugwagen". They also have bass drums, xylophones, & wood blocks) today almost any other "loud" instrument may be in use: steel drum, bagpipe, piccolo, clarinet, saxophone, etc.

== History ==
First explicitly mentioned in 16th century A.D., this type of music has its origins in the folk custom of chasing away the 'spirits of winter' by blowing cows' horns. To this end, the music of the carnival season also needed to be sufficiently loud, weird, and frightening. Rattles, tin pails, drums, cow bells, or whistles came into use. Imaginative masks and costumes to frighten away the spirits of winter were initially fashioned of towels and old rags. In 1874, a brass marching band was part of the Fasnacht celebration in Basel for the first time. The term "Guggenmusik" is first documented at the Basel carnival of 1906. Since 1934, Guggenmusik has boomed and is performed usually on Shrove Tuesday, known as Guggetag. In the 1950s, "Gugge fever" spilled over from Switzerland into southern Germany, Italy and Austria.

There is a similar music and costume carnival tradition in some parts of the Netherlands and Belgium called nl:Dweilorkest

At present, the world's largest "international Guggenmusik" gathering is a two-day event held annually in Schwäbisch Gmünd, Germany, bringing together bands from Austria, Germany, Liechtenstein, Great Britain, and Switzerland, attracting 60,000 to 100,000 visitors.
