= Swiss folklore =

Local stories and customs of peoples in Switzerland

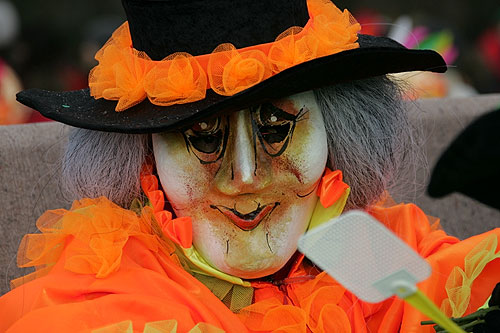
Modern Fasnacht costume from Basel. Fasnacht, a mixture of Christian and pre-Christian beliefs, is a pre-Lenten Carnival.

Swiss folklore describes a collection of local stories, celebrations, and customs of the alpine and sub-alpine peoples that occupy Switzerland. The country of Switzerland is made up of several distinct cultures including German, French, Italian, as well as the Romansh speaking population of Graubünden. Each group has its own unique folkloric tradition.

Switzerland has always occupied a crossroads of Europe. While Switzerland has existed as an alliance and country since 1291, the Swiss as a culture and people existed well before this time. Before the Swiss, the region was occupied by Pagan and later Christian Germanic tribes, which would become the Swiss. Before the Germanic peoples, the region was occupied by Roman and Gallo-Roman populations. Finally, before the Romans the Celtic Helvetii lived in what would become Switzerland. In addition to conquest, Switzerland has been a crossroads of Europe since at least the Roman Empire. Constant movement of cultures and ideas into Switzerland has created a rich and varied folklore tradition.

The study of folklore (Folkloristics) is known as Volkskunde in German. The study of Swiss folklore originates in the 19th century. The central figure of its academic development is Eduard Hoffmann-Krayer, who founded the Swiss Society for Volkskunde in 1896.

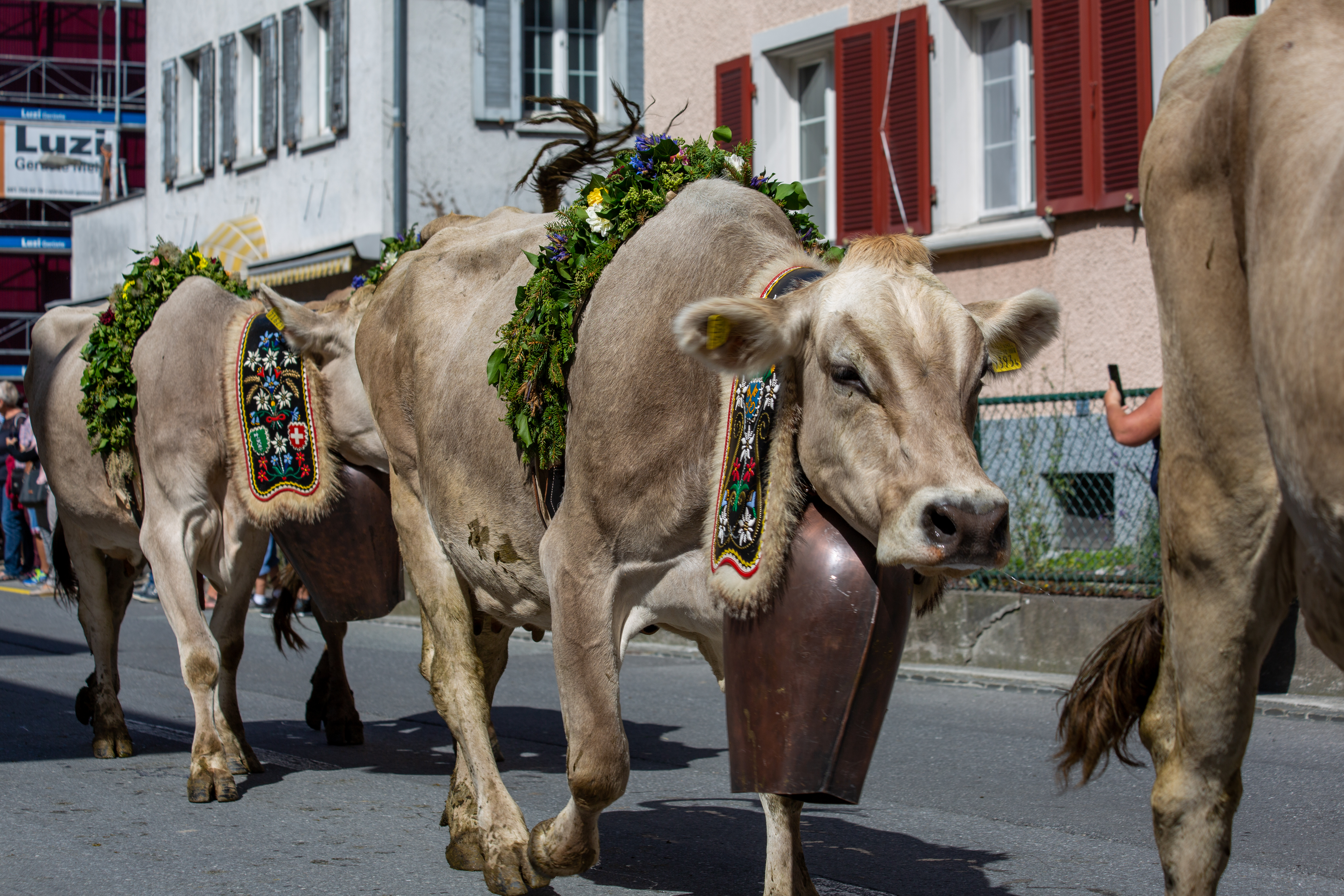
Almabtrieb at Mels in 2019

== Festivals ==
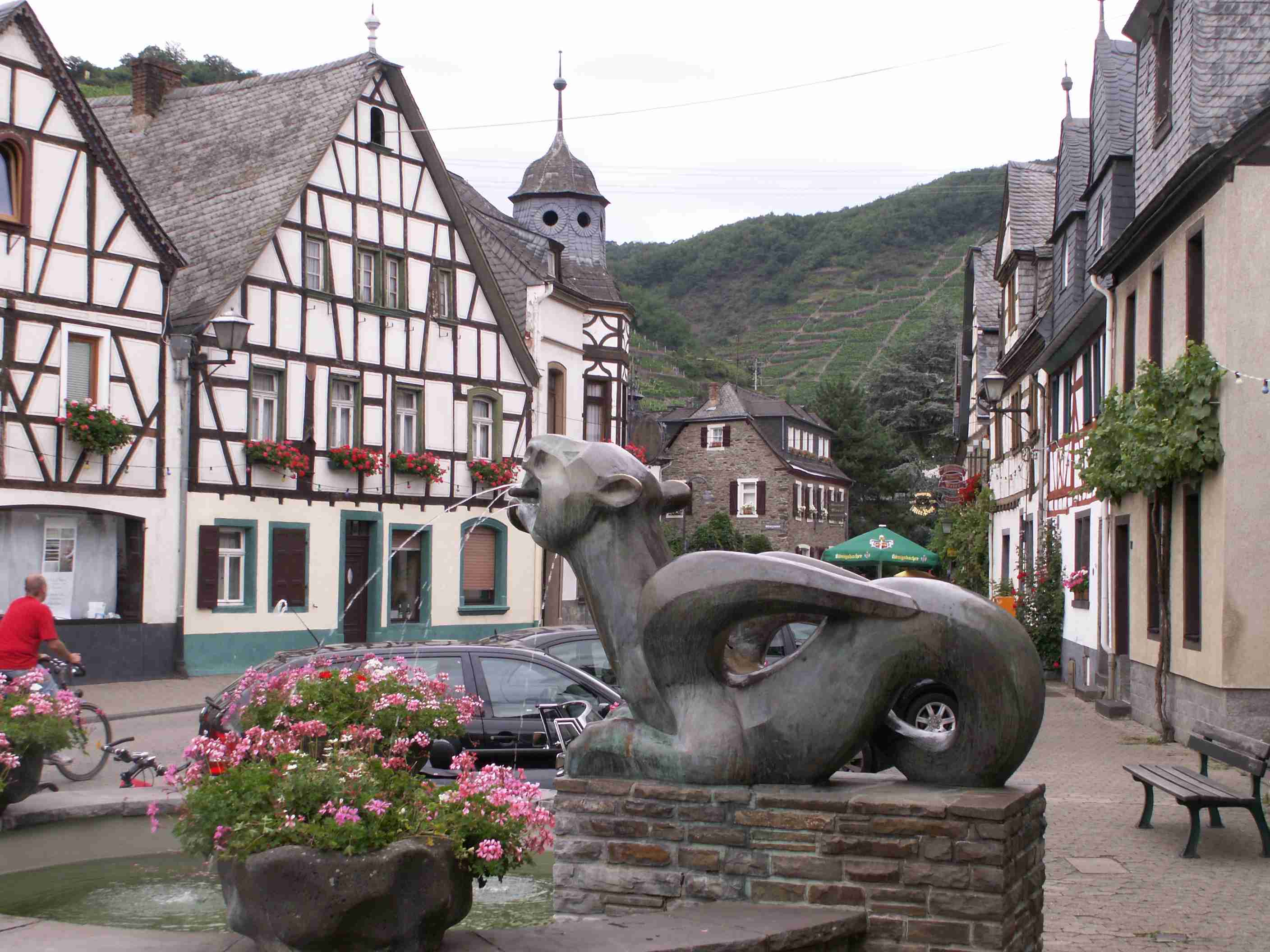
Tatzelwurm fountain in Kobern-Gondorf

- Berchtoldstag, festival in honour of Berchta or Berchtold.
- Fasnacht (or Fastnacht), a pre-Lenten carnival.
  - Eis-zwei-Geissebei, a Fasnacht event for children in Rapperswil.
- Klausjagen, parade festival on the eve of Saint Nicholas Day.
- Schützenfest
- Sechseläuten, a spring fire festival.
- Tschäggätä, masked carnival parade.
- Ubersitz, a Christmas parade festival.
- Silvesterklausen, a New Year's Eve tradition in Appenzell-Ausserrhoden.
- Unspunnenfest

== Customs ==
- Bäregräubschi and Chöderchessi are traditional wedding presents in the Simmental (Bernese Oberland). The former is a kind of fork symbolising the male element in the wedding, and the latter is a magical bucket representing the female aspect. Reported in an Italian anthology of Alpine culture in the 1860s, it is unknown whether this custom is still practiced.
- Räbeliechtli ("turnip lights") are lanterns hand-carved from turnips. The turnip is hollowed out and designs are carved into it, which are lit by a candle in the turnip. The children of the villages then walk through the streets of their town with the lanterns and sing traditional songs. The custom originates with thanksgiving traditions at the end of harvest in November.
- Schwingen
- Steinstossen

== Mythical beings ==
- Berchtold, a white-cloaked being and leader of the Wild Hunt.
- Böögg, or bogeyman, of the Sechseläuten festival.
- Dragons, serpentine monsters often having wings and breathing fire. One such tale involved a cooper who drunkenly stumbled into a cave where he encountered a pair of these creatures. These dragons were unusual in that they were friendly and allowed the cooper to stay with them through the winter. However, when he returned home in the spring he found that he was so used to eating dragon food that he could no longer stomach human fare, and eventually starved to death. Dragonet ("little dragon") tales originated in Switzerland during the Middle Ages.
- Dwarfs are little men associated with hills and the earth. Described as happy and helpful, they raise cattle and produce magical cheeses. This cheese has the property of replenishing itself as long as a piece is left over after eating. They are sometimes portrayed as wearing green cloaks and red caps, and having long white beards. They live in caves and mines and they know where subterranean treasures may be found. They are guardians of the chamois, a species of mountain goat. They are expert blacksmiths and weaponsmiths, and despite their good nature they will play vengeful pranks if they are insulted or mistreated.
- Fairies, a general class of magical beings. In Swiss fairy tale literature they are ruled by a Fairy Queen, are associated with flowers and warmth, and have frequent battles with the frost giants.
- Frost Giants inhabit the high peaks of the Alps and are ruled by a Frost King. Their children take the form of avalanches, and the giants take great pride in the destruction caused by them. They have the ability to freeze any living thing that gets near them. They are sometimes portrayed as having long beards made of icicles and wearing wooden shoes hollowed out from the trunks of fir trees. Frost giants may literally melt into puddles of cold water if the weather is too warm or if they are exposed to the charms of a particularly beautiful fairy.
- Gnomes, earth spirits or elementals from the writings of the Swiss physician Paracelsus. They are said to have caused the landslide that destroyed the Swiss village of Plurs in 1618. The villagers had become wealthy from a local gold mine created by the gnomes who poured liquid gold down into a vein for the benefit of humans. This newfound prosperity led to the corruption of the village which greatly offended the gnomes.
- Herwisch is similar to the will-o'-the-wisp. They inhabit marshy terrain and turn their lanterns on at night, leading travelers astray to flounder in the water. If they are mocked or angered, they will frighten the offender by chasing him and flapping their wings in his face. The Herwisch is also part of the folklore of Germany where it displays the same characteristics.
- Huttefroueli (or Greth Schell), an old woman who carries her husband on her back in the Ubersitz festival.
- Imps, evil spirits that ride on the Föhn or south wind.
- Jack-of-the-Bowl, a house spirit and the most well known Swiss kobold, otherwise known as Jean de la Boliéta in French, or Napf-Hans in German. In return for a bowl of sweet cream left out for him each night, he would lead the cows to graze in places considered dangerous to humans, but none of the cows ever suffered injury. The path used by him was always clear of stones no matter how rocky the mountainside, and this came to be known as Boliéta's Path.
- Jack Frost, a personification of winter.
- Kobolds (or "Servants") are house spirits related to dwarfs but they inhabit remote dwellings and shielings (summer houses used by herdsmen on the mountains). The most well known Swiss kobold is Jean de la Boliéta (Jack-of-the-Bowl), or Napf-Hans in German.
- Mountain Giants are primordial giants that live in caves and are big and strong but simpleminded compared to humans. Valleys were formed when they walked about on the earth, and rivers were formed from the weeping of their wives and daughters when they were mistreated by their male kinsmen. Gargantua ("Old Gargy") is their king and Bertha is his daughter. Hotap was a giant who enjoyed eating humans, and his friend Schoppe was a personification of alcoholic beverages (similar to John Barleycorn), especially the destructive consequences of overconsumption. Hotap was unable to resist his partner's influence and eventually drank himself to death.
- Perchta (or Berchta, Bertha, "The Shining One"), Germanic goddess and white-cloaked leader of the Perchten who drive bad spirits away, and female leader of the Wild Hunt. 6 January is her festival day.
- Perchten, those followers who work with Perchta, and also the name of their wooden animal masks.
- Samichlaus leads a donkey gives with Mandarin Orange, Nuts, and Chocolate for good children.
- Companions of Saint Nicholas
  - Schmutzli is one of the Companions of Saint Nicholas. He has a dark or sooty complexion and accompanies Saint Nicholas on his gift-giving rounds. He carries switches and a sack in which he puts bad children. In the French-speaking cantons he is known as Père Fouettard ("Father Whipper").
- Schnabelgeiss, a tall goat with a beak in the Ubersitz festival.
- Tatzelwurm (or Stollenwurm) combines the features of a cat and a serpent, allegedly photographed by a Swiss photographer named Balkin in 1934.
- Türst, the Wild Hunter.
- Undines, water spirits or elementals from the writings of Paracelsus. They are usually portrayed in Swiss fairy tales as young maidens who love to sit or dance near brooks and rivers or in marshes among the reeds. They have wavy golden hair with a wreath of pond lilies, and are clothed in white mist, for which reason they are also known as mist maidens. They do not like to be seen but may be encountered on moonlit nights. There are also male undines, though less frequent, and in one tale there is even a king of the undines who brings a human princess down to his crystal palace beneath a lake to make her his bride. Both male and female undines are able to disguise themselves as mortals, though their fairy nature may be revealed by their green clothing which will always feel wet.
- Vogel Gryff ("Griffin Bird")

== Legends ==
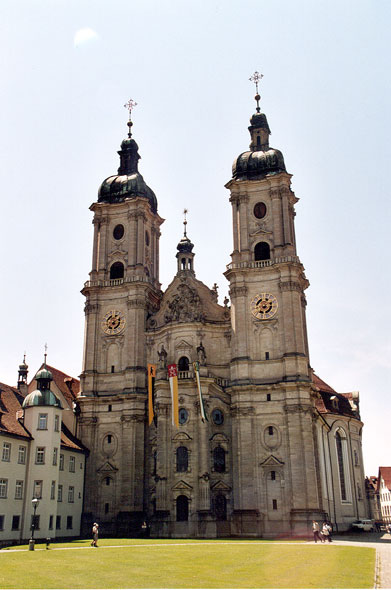
The Abbey of St. Gall, founded on the site of his hermitage

The legends of Switzerland include historic and semi-mythic people and places that shaped the history and culture of the nation.

=== Christianization ===
- Saint Gall, an Irish monk who in the early 7th century helped introduce Christianity to eastern Switzerland. The Abbey of St. Gall is believed to have been built on the site of his hermitage.
- Magnus of Füssen, a missionary saint in southern Germany. He was active in the 7th or 8th century and is considered the founder of St. Mang's Abbey, Füssen.
- Saint Fridolin, patron of Glarus. He is traditionally believed to be an Irish saint who founded Säckingen Abbey, Baden, in the 6th or 7th century. According to legend, he converted a landowner who left his estates, now the Canton of Glarus, to Fridolin. When the landowner's brother took Fridolin to court over the gift, Fridolin raised the landowner from the dead to confirm its legitimacy.

=== Old Swiss Confederacy ===
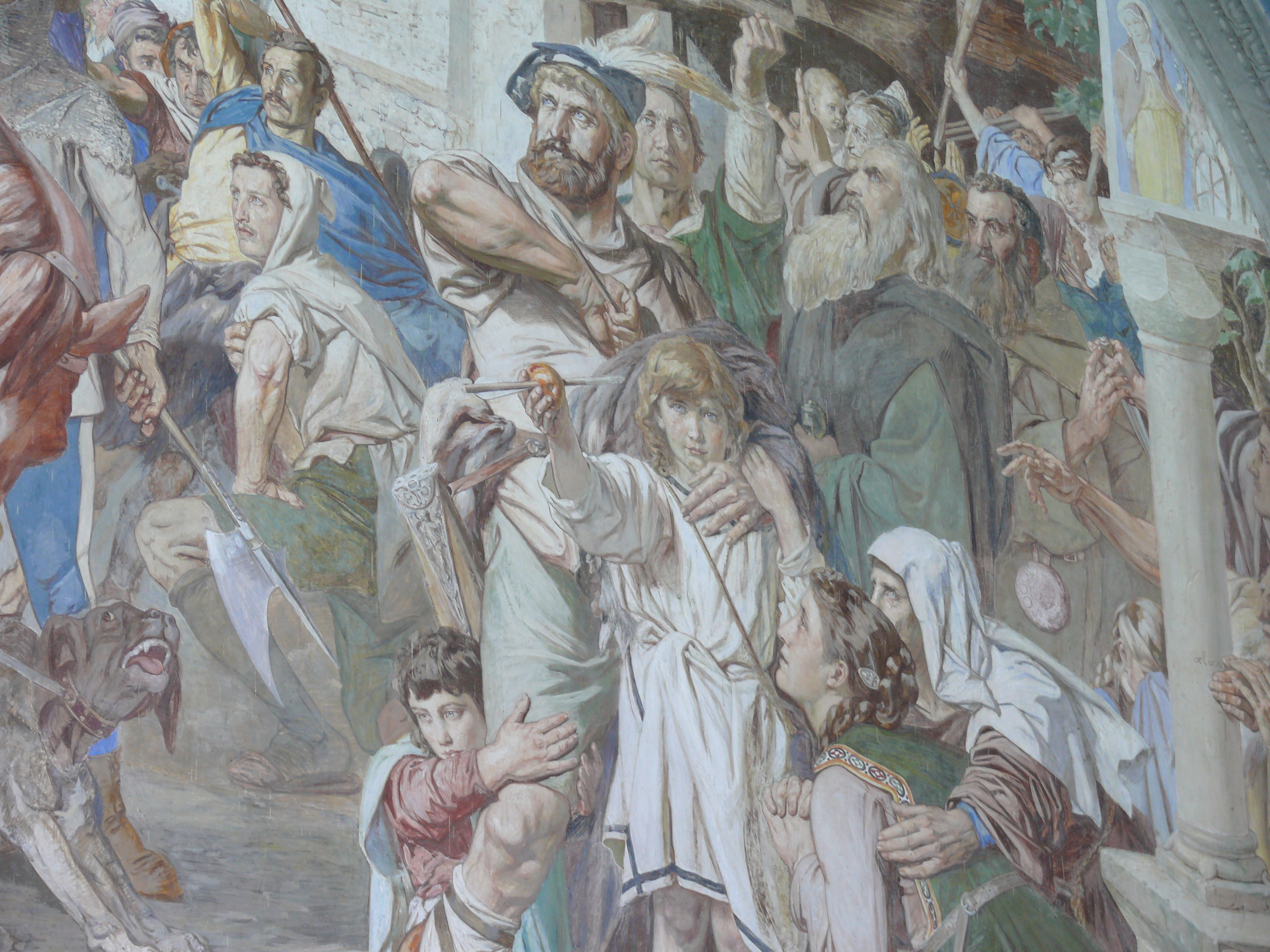
A fresco showing William Tell and his son after he shot an apple off his son's head

- Teufelsbrücke is a bridge which was supposedly erected by the Devil.
- William Tell is a Swiss folk hero who was forced to shoot an apple off his son's head by the tyrannical reeve of Habsburg Austria. After successfully shooting the apple and escaping the reeve's men, he assassinated the reeve and started a revolution. He became a central figure in Swiss patriotism as it was constructed during the Restoration of the Confederacy after the Napoleonic era.
- Rütlischwur, a legendary oath of the Old Swiss Confederacy, taken on the Rütli, a meadow above Lake Lucerne, by three men representing Schwyz, Uri and Unterwalden. It became connected to the legend of William Tell.
- Arnold Winkelried was a possibly legendary hero of the Swiss Battle of Sempach against the Habsburg Duke Leopold III of Austria. According to the story, when the Swiss army was unable to break through the Austrian pikes, Winkelried threw himself on the pikes and used his body to open a hole in the Austrian lines leading to the Swiss victory at Sempach. Though the existence of Arnold Winkelried is disputed, the story was another central part of Swiss patriotism in the 19th century.
- Bruder Klaus was a Swiss monk and ascetic who is considered the patron saint of Switzerland. In 1481 the leaders of the Old Swiss Confederacy began quarreling over treasure from the Burgundian Wars and civil war appeared likely. Bruder Klaus was consulted and passed a secret message to the quarreling leaders. The message, the contents of which are unknown, calmed the tempers and led to the drawing up of the Stanser Verkommnis which expanded the Confederation.

== Fairy tales and folktales ==
=== Griffis ===
- The Alpine Hunter and His Fairy Guardian – tells of a hunter and his lover, a fairy named Silver Wreath who agrees to marry him.
- The Avalanche That Was Peacemaker – an avalanche goes against its own destructive nature and becomes a settler of disputes among mortals, much to the annoyance of its frost giant kinsmen.
- The Dwarf and His Confectionery – a dairy farmer is punished for trying to steal the secrets of making candy from the Dwarf King.
- The Dwarfs' Secret – describes how hunters were taught by the dwarfs to improve their smoothbore firearms through the innovation of rifling.
- The Fairies and Their Playground – the fairies gather together for a meeting to remember a golden age of Switzerland before the encroachment of human technology and the tourism trade.
- The Fairy in the Cuckoo Clock – tells how humans were inspired by the fairies to build the first cuckoo clock.
- The Fairy of the Edelweiss – tells of the first edelweiss flower that was a fairy transformed by the Fairy Queen to fight the Frost King.
- The Frost Giants and the Sunbeam Elves – tells how the frost giants once ruled Switzerland as a land of eternal ice and snow until the Fairy Queen and her army, with help from her friend the Sun, transformed the land into a paradise where mortals could live. Many of the fairies chose to become flowers, trees, and meadow grasses such as the Arolla pine, the edelweiss, and the Alpine poa before marching up the mountainsides to make war against the giants.
- The Palace Under the Waves – the king of the undines brings a human princess down to his crystal palace beneath a lake to make her his bride.
- The Tailor and the Giant – tells of a giant named Kisher who served in the army of Charlemagne. He was such a great warrior that Charlemagne gave him the name Einheer ("One Man Army"). When he was outsmarted by a tailor they became adventuring companions, fought a dragon, and contested each other over the hand of a princess.
- The Wonderful Alpine Horn – describes how the Swiss people first received the Alpine horn as a gift from the fairies.

=== Franz Hohler ===
- The Totemügerli - tells of a playing group of hill spirits/fairies (the eponymous Totemuegerli), to which one should never say 'no', asking two (human) men for help carrying something up a craggy hillside. The object-being-carried starts to speak to the two men, and one of the two men runs away. The one who continued on the task, wakes up the next morning safe but frightened; whereas the one who ran away is never seen again.

"S git Luet, wo saege, dass sider am Schtotzgroten es Totemuegerli meh desumeschirggelet."
In translation: "There are those who say, that since that day, there is one more Totemuegerli playing on that hillside."

=== Müller-Guggenbühl ===
- The Singing Fir Tree – a woodcarver discovers a singing fir tree in the forest near his village.

== See also ==
- Alpine culture
- Gnomes of Zurich
- Heidi
- Helvetia
- Pre-Christian Alpine traditions
- Transhumance in the Alps
