= Ubersitz =

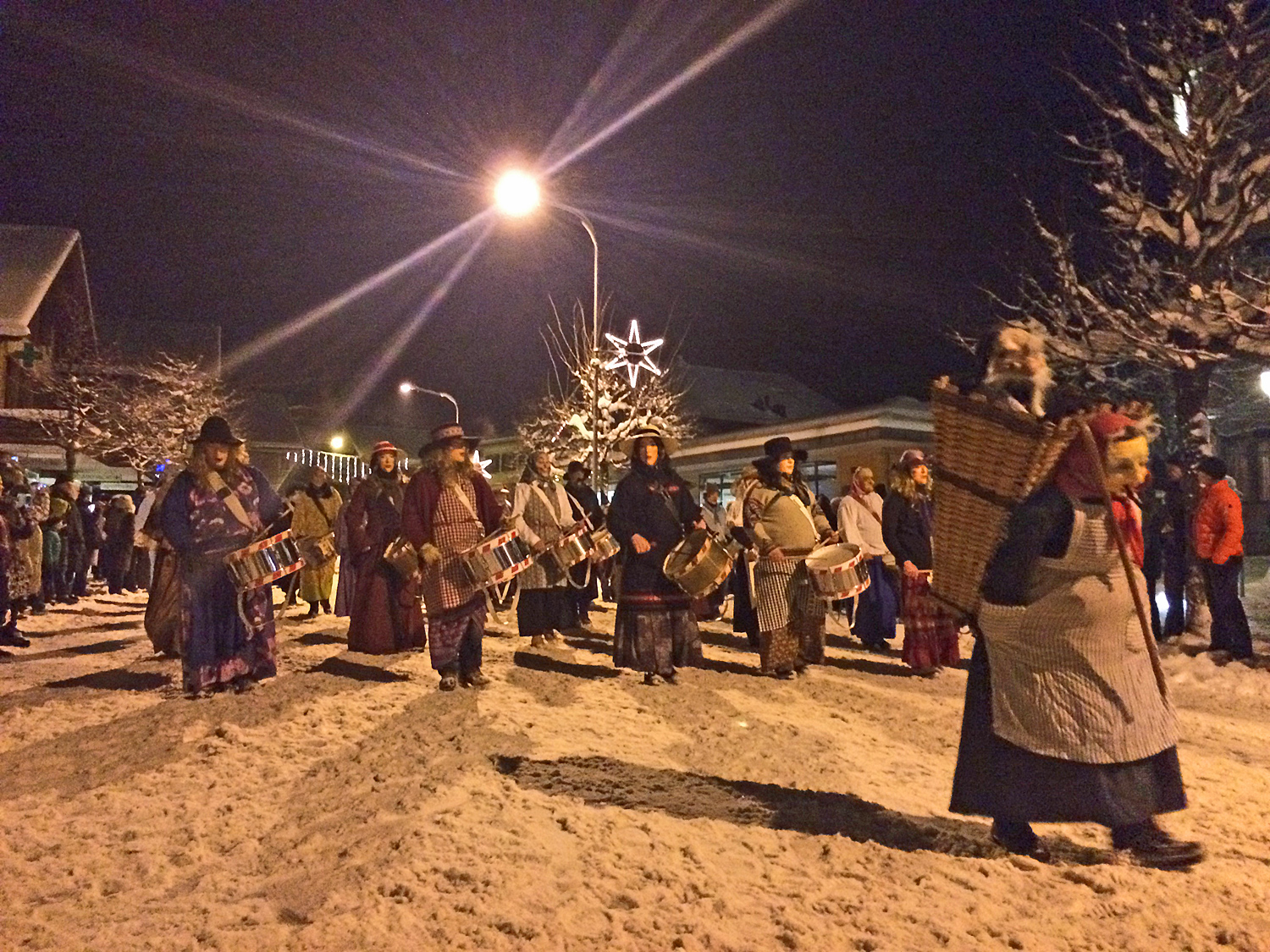
Huttefroueli and her group of treichlers at the Ubersitz in the streets of Meiringen

The Ubersitz is a traditional custom in Hasli, Bernese Oberland, Switzerland. On Christmas day, at nightfall, schoolboys begin with Treichlen, walking through the villages in small troops, sounding giant cow-bells. The following nights, the boys are joined, and later replaced, by adult men. The Trychling culminates on 30 December (or the last workday before that date), with the Ubersitz in Meiringen. On this day, the Treichler are carrying frightening masks (except for the people of Unterbach and Hasliberg who remain unmasked)

== The different Treichel groups ==
=== Meiringen ===
The Treichel group of Meiringen is the largest one, amounting up to nearly 200 people. They have cow bells and drums and are masked very variously from traditional masks to frightening monster masks. The group is accompanied by a "Huttefroueli" (an effigy of an old woman). The front 5 of the group are mostly masked the same. The group of Meiringen is known for their fast pace.

=== Willigen ===
The Treichel group of Willigen belongs to the 4 largest ones. Traditionally, only men are allowed to participate. They have cow bells and drums and are all masked as women or witches. The group of Willigen is accompanied by a "Huttefroueli" as well as a "Schnabelgeiss" (a tall monster with goat's horns and a beak).

=== Hausen ===
The Treichel group of Hausen belongs to the 4 largest one as well. They also have cow bells and drums and are masked variously, with focus on the traditional woman or witch mask. The group of Huasen is accompanied by a "Huttefroueli" and a "Schnabelgeiss"

=== Hasliberg ===
The Treichel group of Hasliberg is a coalition of all communities at the mountain "Hasliberg". They only come to Meiringen at the Ubersitz. They only have cow bells and always remain unmasked.

=== Unterbach ===
Unterbach is located a few kilometers away from Meiringen. However, the Treichel group of Unterbach comes to Meiringen every day of the "Altjahrswoche" including the Ubersitz. They have only cow bells and are dressed in traditional garbs.

=== Isenbolgen ===
Isenbolgen is a small quarter of Meiringen. The Treichel group of Isenbolgen belongs to the smallest ones. They have cow bells and larger drums than the other groups, but fewer. They wear masks made only out of natural components such as wood, plants or animal furs. The group is accompanied by two dwarfs and is known for their slow pace.

=== Innertkirchen ===
Innertkirchen is located behind a small mountain pass. The Treichel group of Innertkirchen only comes to Meiringen at the Morning after the Ubersitz's night. They have cow bells and similar drums as Isenbolgen. The front 5 of the group are mostly masked the same. They are accompanied by a big black "Schnabelgeiss".

=== Gadmen ===
Gadmen is located some kilometers away from Meiringen. The Treichel group of Gadmen only comes to Meiringen at the 29th of December. They only have cow bells and are usually all wearing the same white jumper. The group is known for their special pace.

=== Guttannen ===
Guttannen is also located some kilometers away from Meiringen. The Treichel group of Guttannen only comes to Meiringen at the 29th of December. They have cow bells and the same drums as the group of Innertkirchen. They are not specially dressed.
