= Eis-zwei-Geissebei =

Annual event in Rapperswil, Switzerland

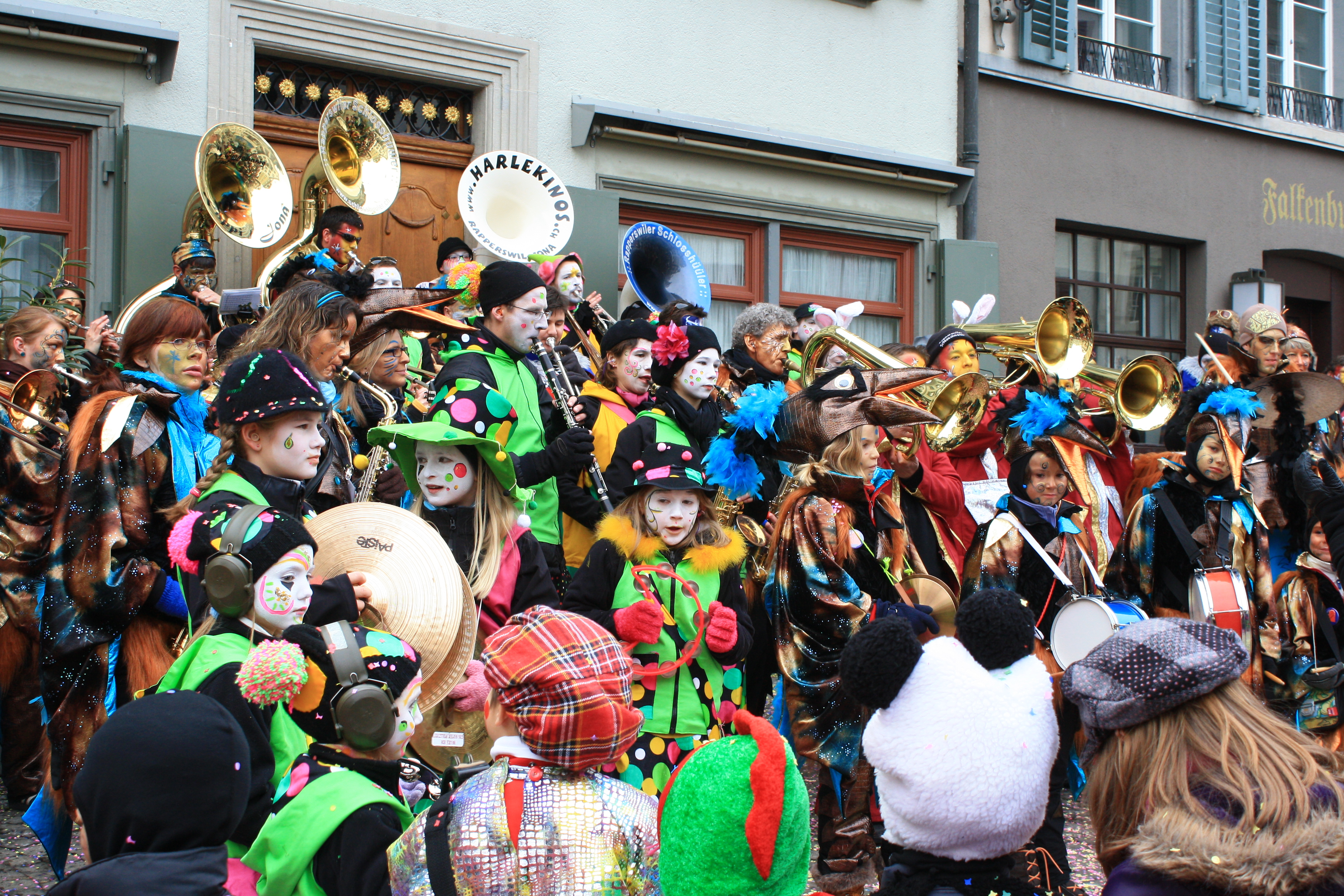
Guggenmusik bands on Hauptplatz

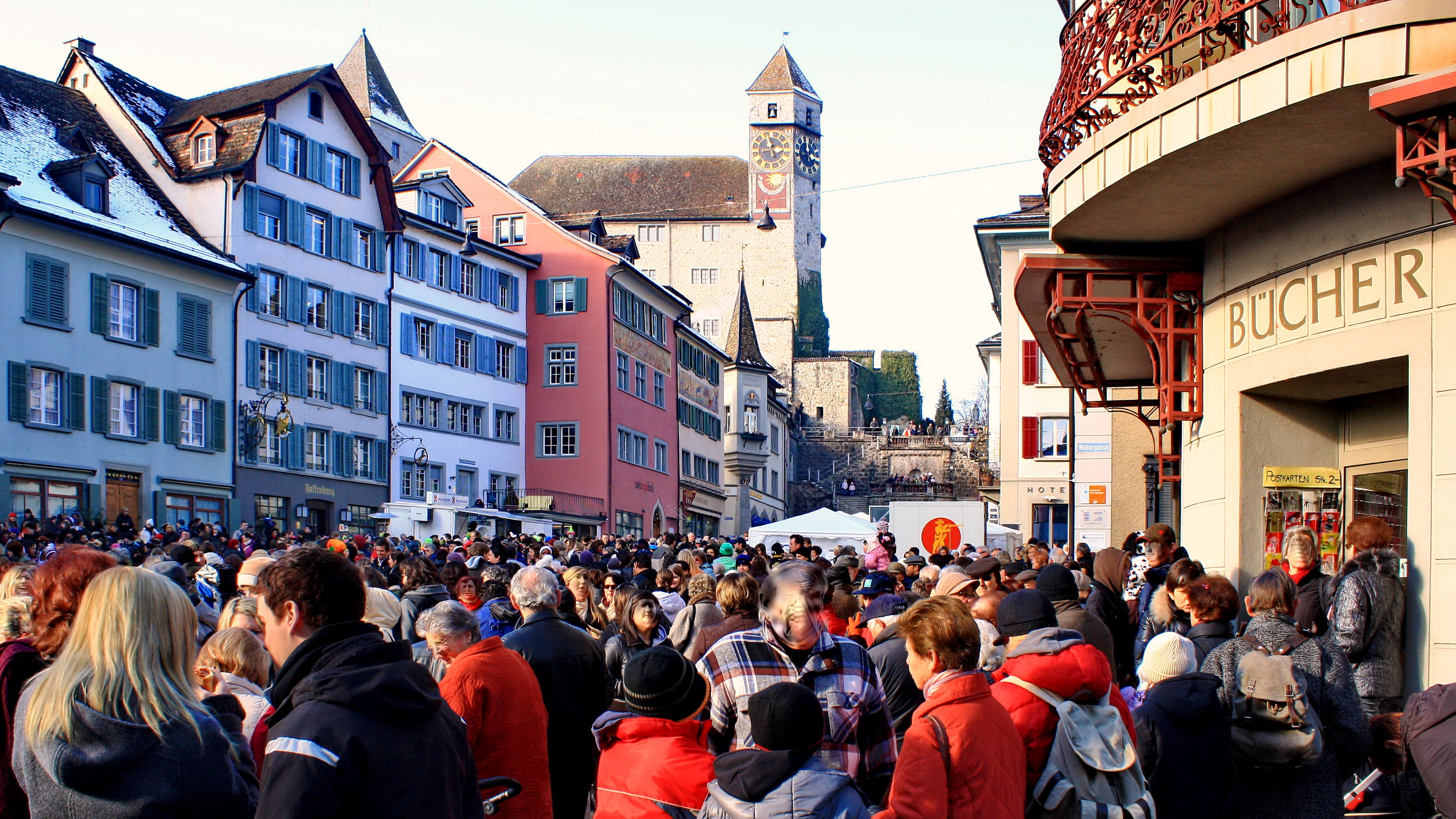
People celebrating the festival on the Hauptplatz (main square), Rapperswil Castle in the background

Eis-zwei-Geissebei is a Carnival festival held in Rapperswil (Switzerland) on Shrove Tuesday.

== History and origin ==
Its origin may go back to the siege and destruction of the city of Rapperswil at St. Matthew in 1350 by Rudolf Brun, first mayor of the city of Zürich. At that time, compassionate citizens served food to hungry children through the windows of their houses, to which the current practice recalls.

== Today ==
After the traditional "Herrenessen" (dinner of the council members) in the Rathaus Rapperswil and cabaret program with distinguished guests, hundreds of children gather in the main square on Shrove Tuesday. At exactly 15:15 the windows of the town hall open and a fanfare sounds.

A council member asks, “Sind alli mini Buebe doo?” (Swiss German: Are all my boys here?), and the answer is given: “Joo! Eis - Zwei - Geissebei!” (Yes, one, two, goat-leg!), whereupon sausages, bread rolls and Biberli (a sweet) are dropped down to the children on the Hauptplatz (main square). Following the so-called Austeilete, in the evening there is intense activity, and the crowning of the carnival, all Guggenmusik (carnival marching bands) gathered on Lindenhof at Schloss Rapperswil to celebrate a roaring concert.

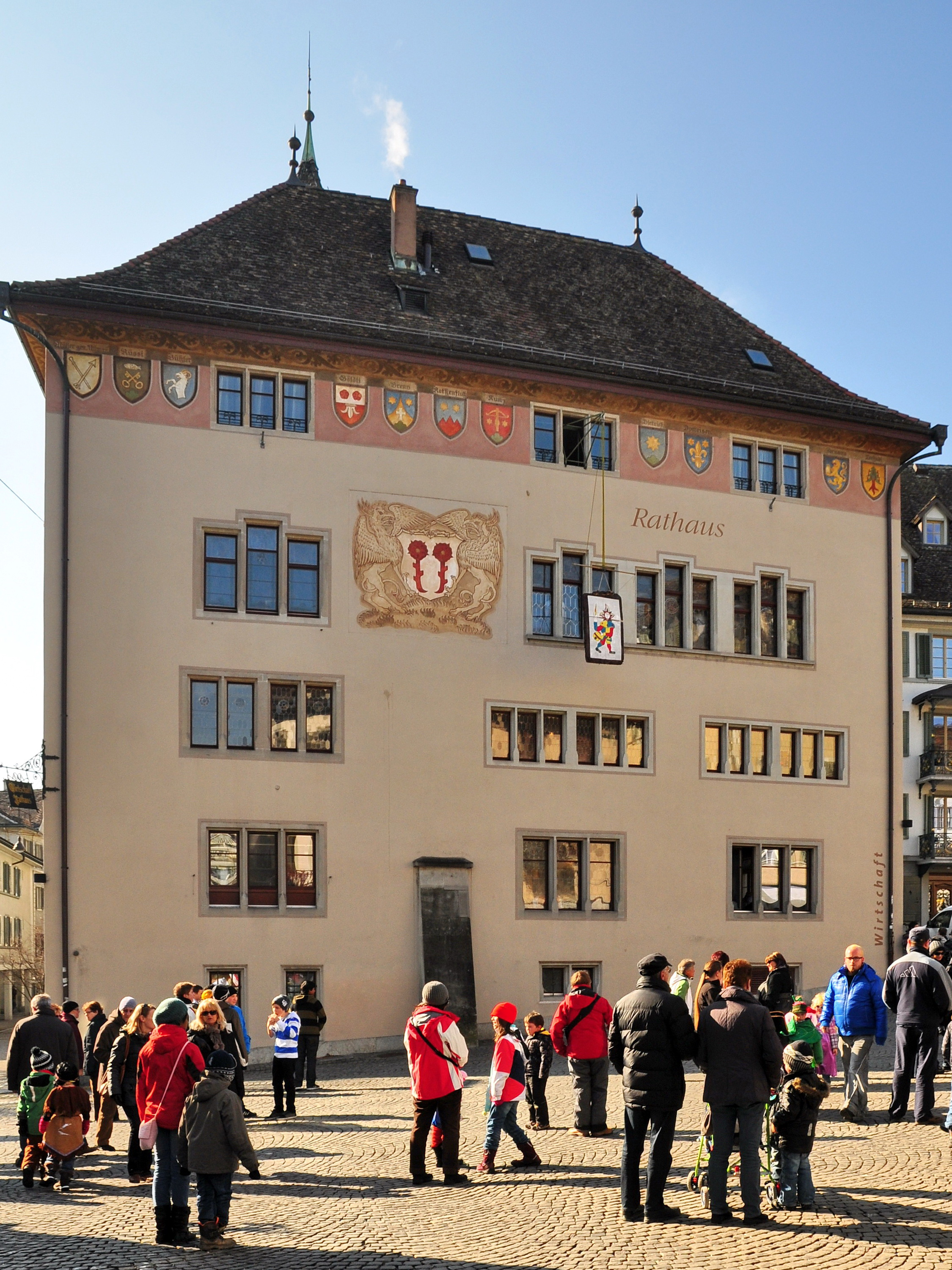
The Rathaus (town hall) of Rapperswil

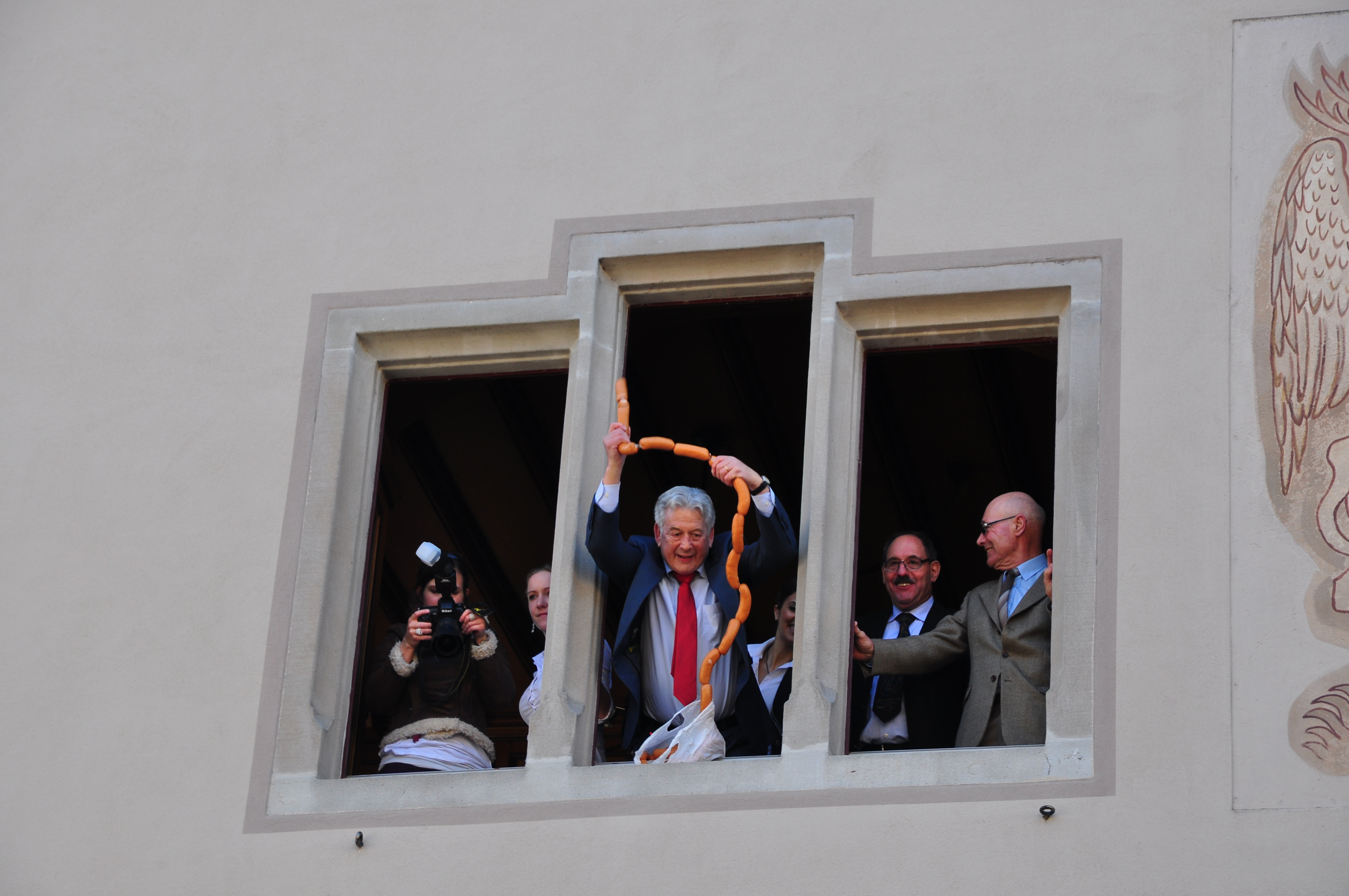
Members of the city council dropping sausages, breads and Biberli (a sweet) down to the children

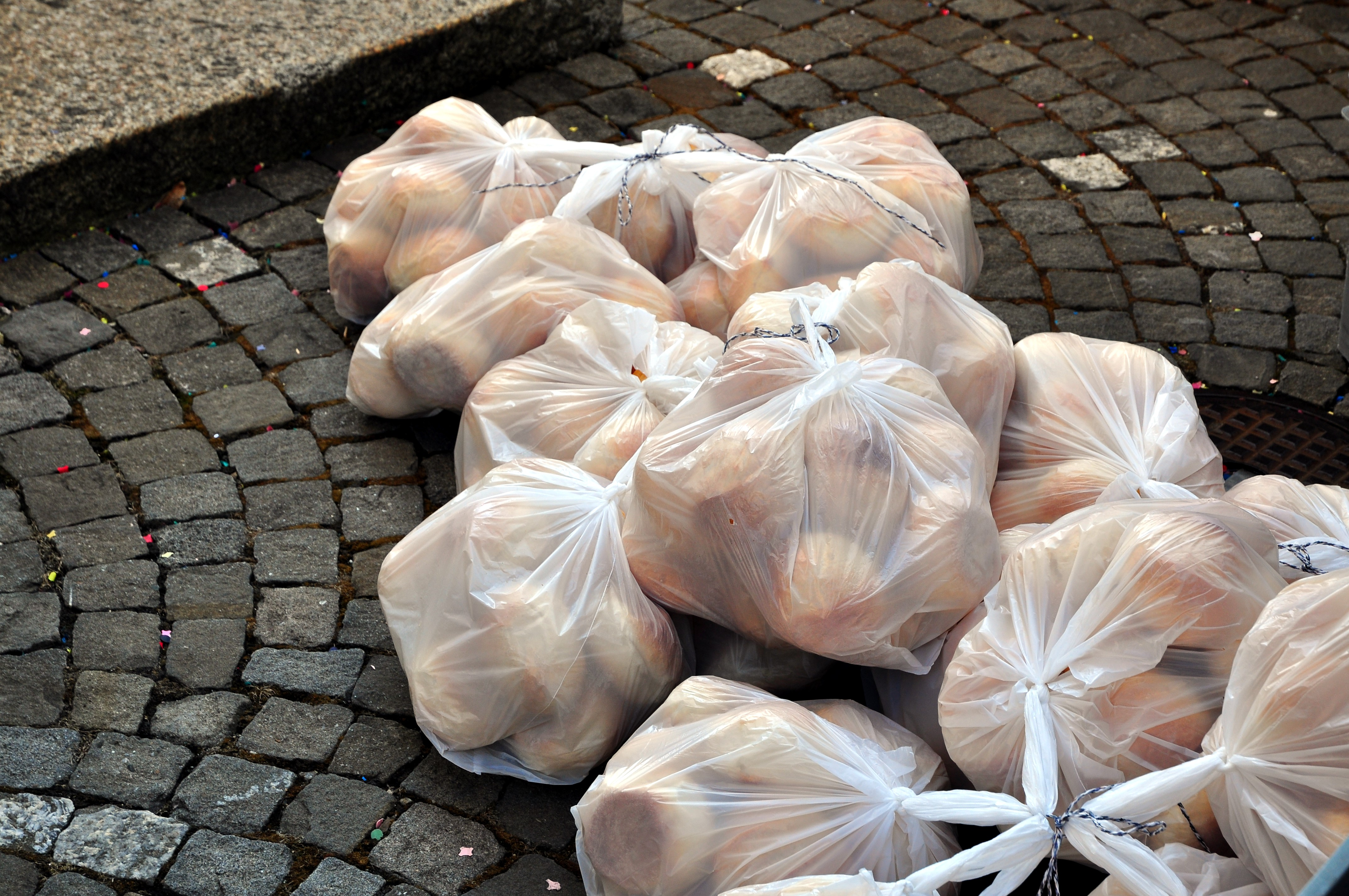

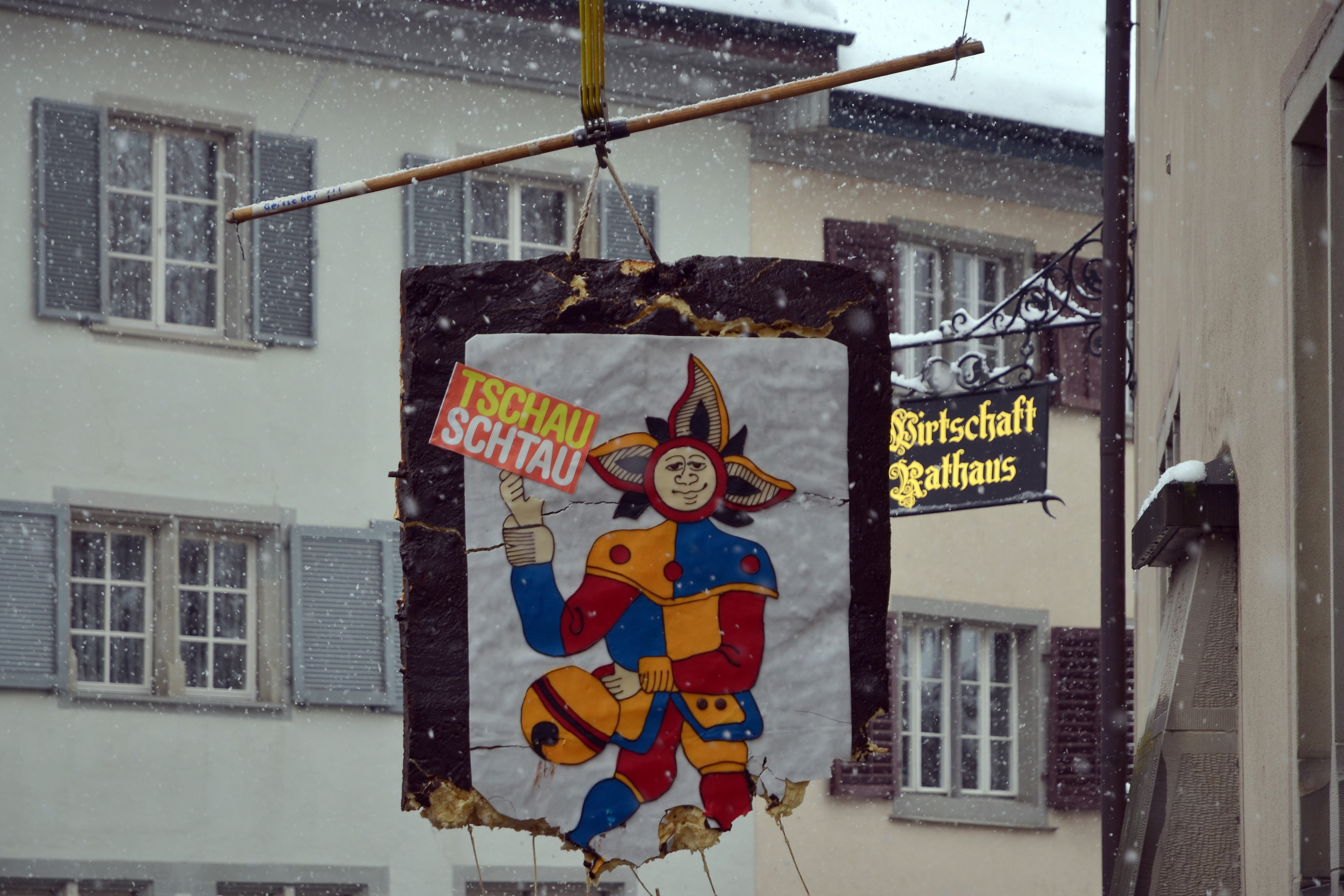

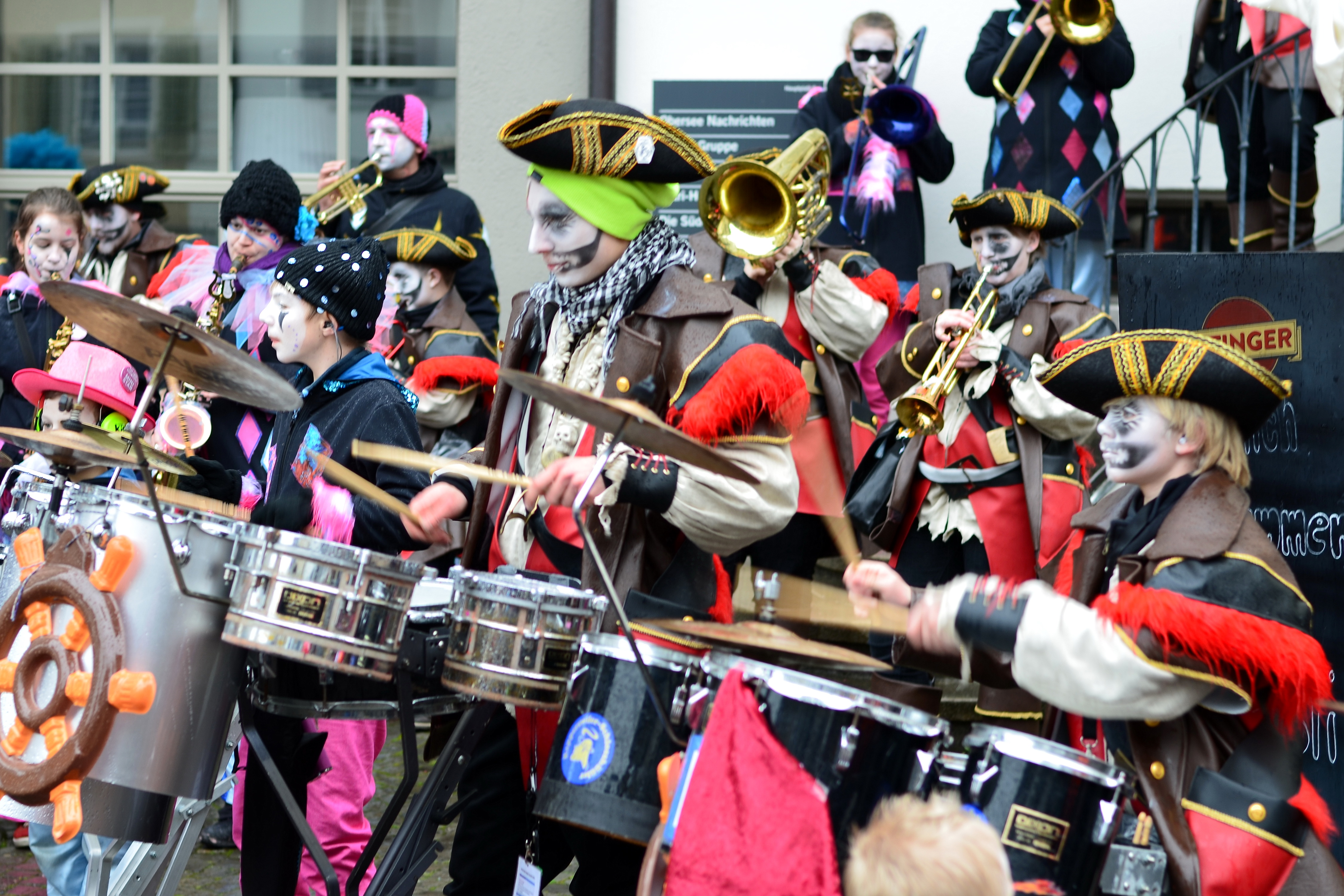
Guggenmusik
