= Name of Switzerland =

Etymology of the country's name

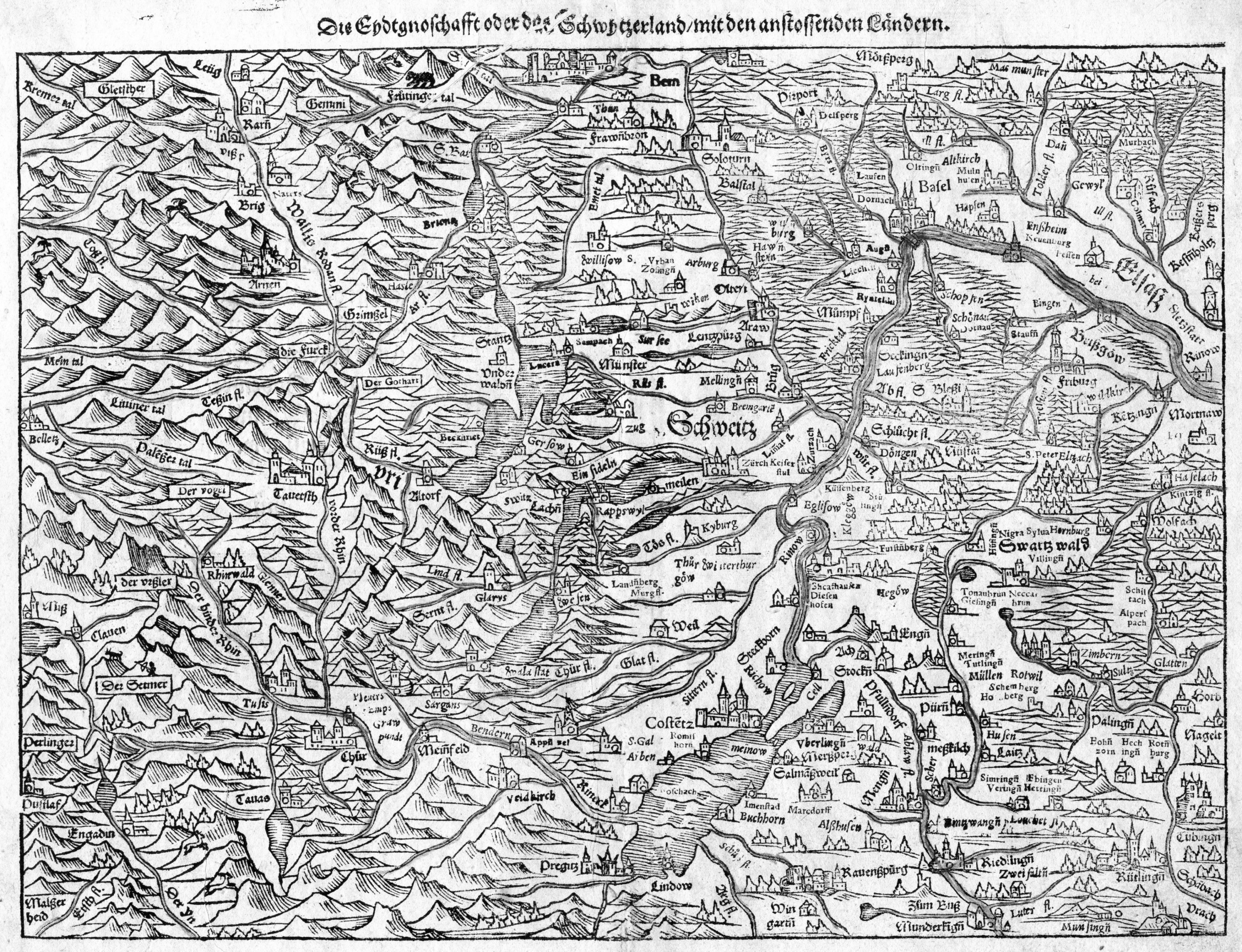
The 1550 map of Switzerland by Sebastian Münster has the title Die Eydtgnoschafft oder das Schwytzerland mit den anstossenden Ländern, treating the terms Eidgenossenschaft and Switzerland as synonyms; in addition, the territory of the Confederacy is labelled Schweitz in the map (while the settlement is labelled Switz).

The English name of Switzerland is a compound containing Switzer, an obsolete term for the Swiss, which was in use during the 16th to 19th centuries. The English adjective Swiss is a loan from French Suisse, also in use since the 16th century.

The name Switzer is from the Alemannic Schwiizer, in origin an inhabitant of Schwyz and its associated territory, one of the Waldstätten cantons which formed the nucleus of the Old Swiss Confederacy. The name originates as an exonym, applied pars pro toto to the troops of the Confederacy. The Swiss themselves began to adopt the name for themselves after the Swabian War of 1499, used alongside the term for "Confederates", Eidgenossen ("oath-fellows"), used since the 14th century.

The Swiss German name of the country is homophonous to that of the canton and the settlement, but distinguished by the use of the definite article (d'Schwiiz [tʃviːts] for the Confederation, but simply Schwyz [ʃviːts] for the canton and the town).

== Schwyz ==
The toponym Schwyz itself is first attested in 972, as villa Suittes. Its etymology is uncertain, it may be either derived from a Germanic name in *swiþ- ‘strength’ or from either a Germanic (*swint-) or Celtic (*sveit-) word for "clearing". (Note: A summary of the history of suggestions until 1970 is given in Viktor Weibel, “Suittes - Schwyz - Schweiz: Geschichte und Deutung des Namens Schwyz”, Mitteilungen des historischen Vereins des Kantons Schwyz 65 (1972). See also Lexikon der schweizerischen Gemeindenamen, Frauenfeld 2005, 819-20.) The name is recorded as Schwitz in the 13th century, and in the 17th to 18th century often as Schweitz. The spelling of y for [iː] originates as a ligature ij in 15th-century handwriting.

The Swiss chroniclers of the 15th and 16th centuries present a legendary eponymous founder, one Suit (Swit, Schwyt, Switer), leader of a population migrating from Sweden due to a famine. Suit is said to have defeated his brother Scheijo (or Scheyg) in single combat in a dispute over leadership of the new settlement. Petermann Etterlin (fl. 1470s, printed 1507). (Note: Etterlin's account is supposedly based on a "common Swiss chronicle" (Gesta Suitensium, gemeine Schwyzerchronik also reflected in the White Book of Sarnen and later by Aegidius Tschudi (Die Geschichte der Ostfriesen, Swedier und andre, so mit jnen gereisset, vnd wie Switer dem Lande den Namen Swiz gegeben). Etterlin presents the three Waldstätte as representing three different stocks or races, the people of Schwyz as the most recent immigrants (from Sweden), the people of Uri representing the original "Goths and Huns", and the people of Unterwalden representing "the Romans". Vetter, Ueber die Sage von der Herkunft der Schwyzer und Oberhasler aus Schweden und Friesland, 1877, p. 10.)

Use of Switzer, Switenses, Swicenses for troops raised by the Confederacy as a whole, as it were pars pro toto because of the prominence of Schwyz in the early history of the Confederacy, is in use as an exonym from the later 14th century. The development of the Standard German diphthong ei reflects this early adoption. 16th-century French spelling was variously Soisses, Suysses, Souyces, adopted as Swiss in English. Early Italian spellings include Sviceri, Suyzeri; the modern Italian form Svizzeri is already used by Niccolò Machiavelli in 1515. Use of Schwytzerland for the territory of the Confederacy (as opposed to just the territory of Schwyz) develops in the early 16th century, but Schweiz as an endonym enters wider usage only in the course of the 17th and 18th centuries, and then in competition with Helvetia. Johan Jakob Leu in his Allgemeine Helvetische Eydgenössische oder Schweitzerische Lexicon (20 vols., 1747–1765; viz. using the three alternative names alongside one another in the title of his work) criticized the use of "Schweiz" for the Confederacy as confusing, arguing it should properly only be used to refer to the territory of Schwyz. Only in the second half of the 19th century did Schweiz become the dominant or unmarked name for the country only after the formation of the federal state in 1848, and from this time was increasingly also used to refer to the state (officially called Schweizerische Eidgenossenschaft in the constitution of 1848).

== Eidgenossenschaft ==
The original name for the Old Swiss Confederacy was Eidgenossenschaft "oath-fellowship", Schwyz being just one of the participating Lieus or Orte (see Waldstätte). The term has never fallen out of use when referring to the Swiss Confederacy (as opposed to the territory). Eidgenossen translates the Latin conspirati of the Federal Charter of 1291, and the German term Eidgenossen is used in the pact of 1351 between Uri, Schwyz and Unterwalden and the cities of Lucerne and Zürich.

Attestation of the abstract noun Eidgenossenschaft is somewhat younger, recorded in the Pfaffenbrief of 1370 (as unser Eydgnosschaft "our oath-fellowship"). In the Holy Roman Empire, emperor Charles IV outlawed any such conjurationes, confederationes, and conspirationes in his Golden Bull of 1356.

Albrecht von Bonstetten (1479) called the Swiss Confederacy Superioris Germaniae Confoederatio, i.e. "Confederation of Upper Germany". This was translated into German in 1480 as Obertütscheit Eidgnosschaft.

In Early New High German, the word eidgnoßschaft was often simplified to eidgnoschaft. In early modern Swiss usage, Eidgenossenschaft was used without geographic qualifier, but in the 16th century it was often the epithet loblich "praiseworthy", as lobliche eidgnoschaft.

== Helvetia ==
The Old Swiss Confederacy of the early modern period was often called Helvetia or Republica Helvetiorum ("Republic of the Helvetians") in learned humanist Latin. The Latin name is ultimately derived from the name of the Helvetii, the Gaulish tribe living on the Swiss Plateau in the Roman era. The allegory Helvetia makes her appearance in 1672.

The official Latin name Confoederatio Helvetica was introduced gradually after the formation of the federal state in 1848. It appears on coins of the Swiss franc from 1879, and was inscribed on the Federal Palace in 1902. It was used in the official seal from 1948. The abbreviation CH was first introduced in 1909, as international vehicle registration code, and in 1974, it was assigned as ISO 3166-1 alpha-2 country code for Switzerland.

== See also ==
- Languages of Switzerland#Latin
- .ch
