= Ericus Olai =

Swedish theologian and historian (c. 1420 – 1486)

Ericus Olai (c. 1420–1486) was a Swedish theologian and historian. He served as a professor of theology at Uppsala University and dean at Uppsala Cathedral. Ericus Olai was the author of the chronicle Chronica regni Gothorum and was an early proponent of Gothicismus.

== Biography ==
Neither the date nor place of his birth are known with certainty. He was probably born during the 1420s. Olai studied at the University of Rostock (Magister Artium. 1452). After working as canon in Uppsala, he attended the University of Siena (Magister de Sacra Theologia. 1475).

He became a professor of theology at Uppsala University in 1477 and dean at Uppsala Cathedral in 1479. He died on Christmas eve in 1486 and was buried in Uppsala Cathedral. His tomb was the center of a substantial local tradition of veneration of the "holy doctor Ericius". His tombstone was destroyed in a fire in 1702.

Olai initiated what would become the Gothicismus movement of Swedish Romantic nationalism in his Chronica Regni Gothorum, an account of Swedish history until 1468 (completed before 1475). Chronica was first edited in 1615 by historian John Messenius (1579–1636) and became influential in early modern Swedish historiography. Chronica has been preserved in three medieval manuscript copies from the first decades of the sixteenth century at the Uppsala University Library in Uppsala, the National Library of Sweden in Stockholm and in the National Archives of Sweden at Stockholm.

== Additional sources ==
- Ella Heuman and Jan Oberg (eds.) Chronica Regni Gothorum (Almqvist & Wiksell International, Series: Studia Latina Stockholmiensia 35, Stockholm, 1993-1995) ISBN 91-22-01535-3
