= Glogghüs =

Mountain in Switzerland

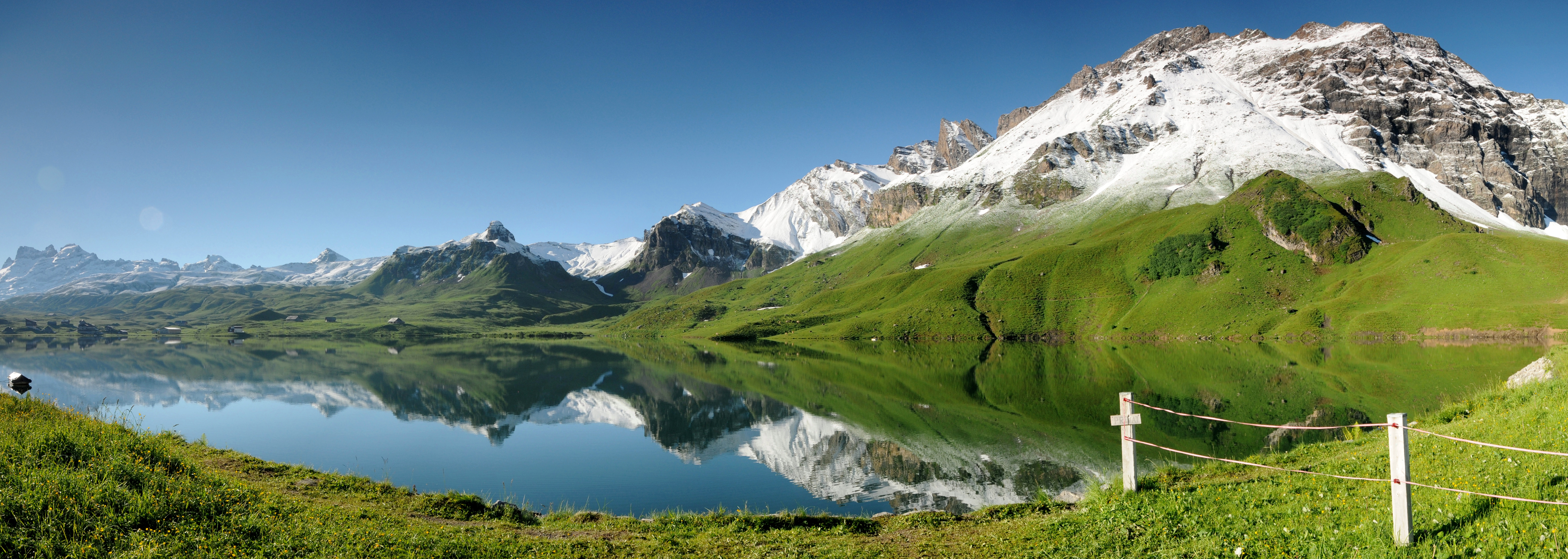
- Glogghüs (right)

Highest point
- Elevation: 2,534 m (8,314 ft)
- Prominence: 554 m (1,818 ft)
- Listing: Alpine mountains 2500-2999 m
- Coordinates: 46°45′50.8″N 08°15′31″E

Geography
- Location within Switzerland
- Location: Obwalden/Bern, Switzerland
- Parent range: Urner Alps

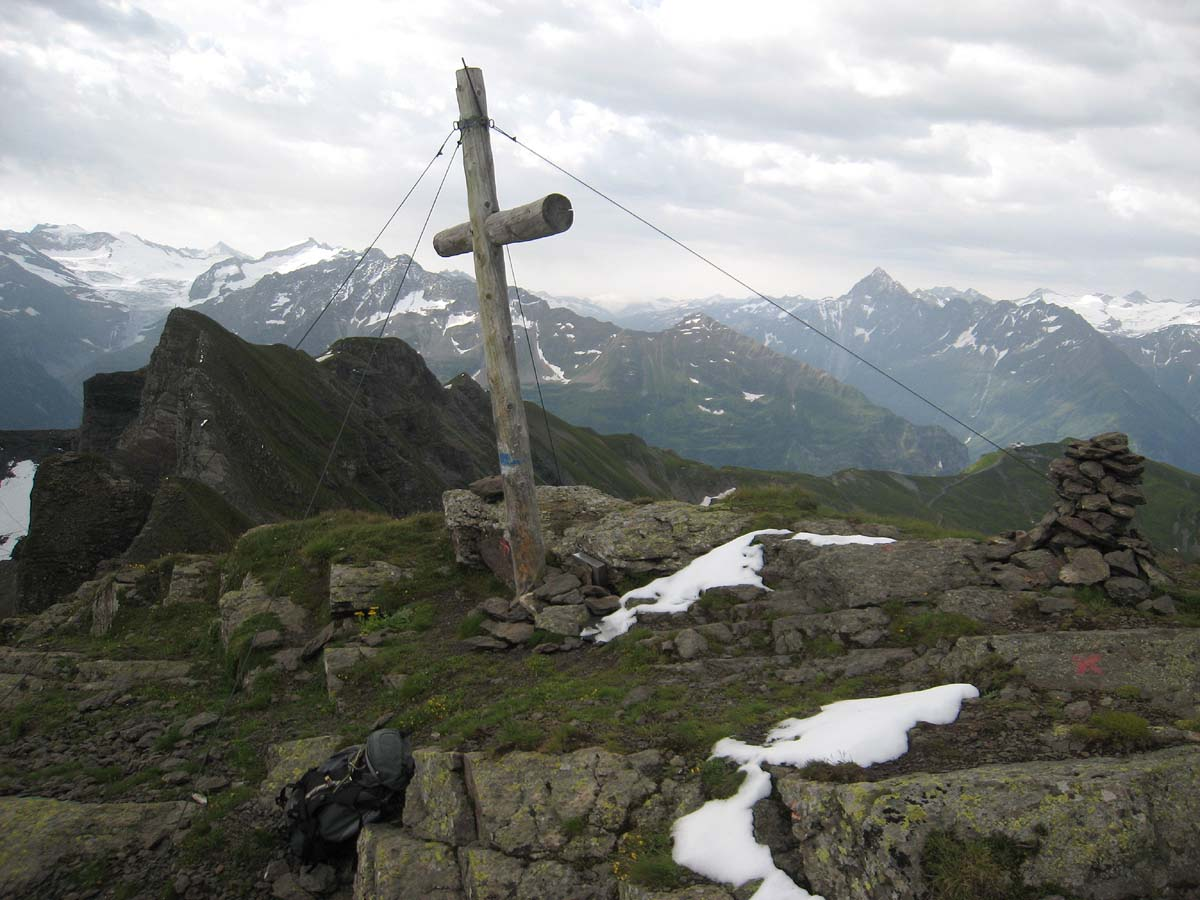
Summit of Glogghüs

The Glogghüs is a mountain of the Urner Alps, located on the border between the Swiss cantons of Obwalden and Bern. On its northern side it overlooks the Melchsee and the village of Melchsee-Frutt.

Its elongated summit also represents the border between the municipalities of Kerns (Canton of Obwalden) and Hasliberg (Canton of Bern).
