= Goldern =

Goldern may refer to

- Goldern (Aarau), a suburb of the city of Aarau, Switzerland
- Goldern (Hasliberg), a village in the municipality of Hasliberg, Bern, Switzerland
