= Tannensee =

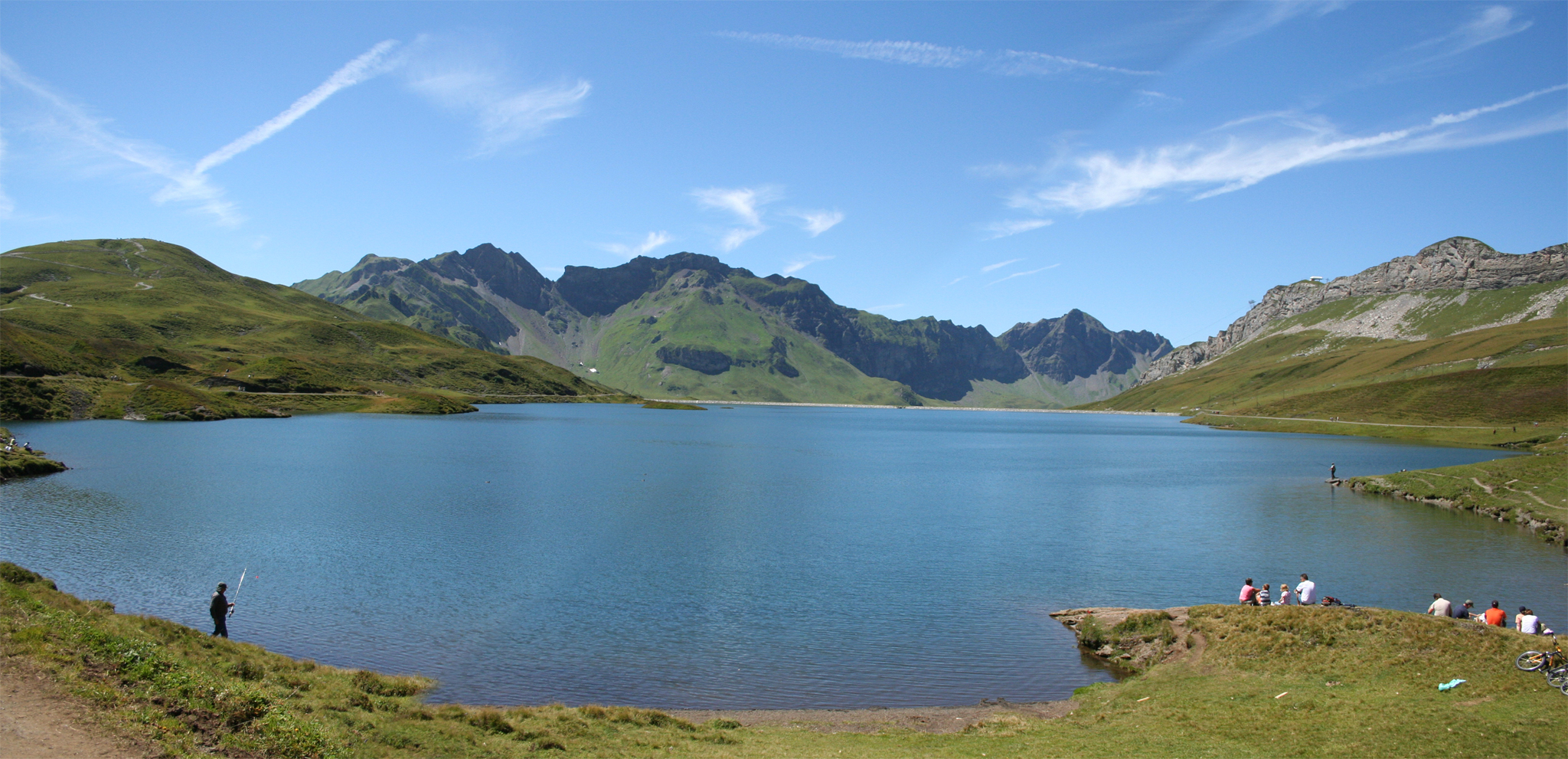

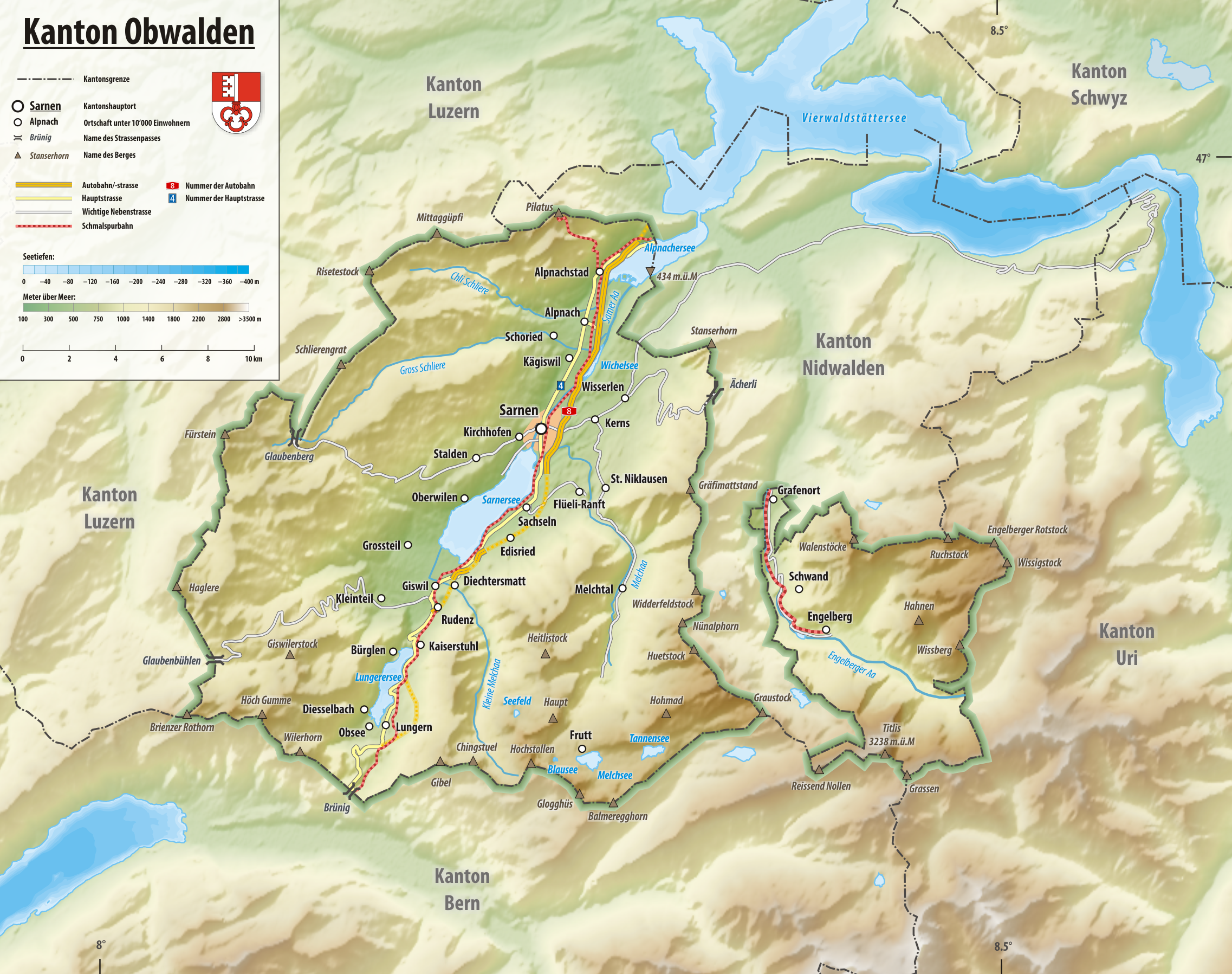
- Location within Canton of Obwalden Location within Canton of Bern Location within Canton of Valais Location within Switzerland Location within Alps
- Interactive map of Tannensee
- Location: Kerns, Obwalden
- Coordinates: 46°46′25″N 8°18′22″E
- Type: reservoir
- Primary inflows: Tannenbach
- Primary outflows: Tannenbach
- Catchment area: 1.3 km^{2} (0.50 sq mi)
- Basin countries: Switzerland
- Surface area: 33 ha (82 acres)
- Water volume: 3.8 million cubic metres (3,100 acre⋅ft)
- Surface elevation: 1,976 m (6,483 ft)

Tannensee is a reservoir in Obwalden, Switzerland. In 1958, Tannenbach and few other creeks were dammed with an earth-fill dam. The reservoir has a volume of 3.8 mio m³ and its surface area is 33 ha (82 acres). The reservoir is used to generate electricity at Kraftwerk Hugschwendi in Kerns.

== See also ==
- List of lakes of Switzerland
- List of mountain lakes of Switzerland
