= Planplatten =

Mountain in the Bernese Oberland in Switzerland

- Location within Switzerland

Highest point
- Elevation: 2,245 m (7,365 ft)
- Prominence: 56 m (184 ft)
- Parent peak: Glogghüs
- Coordinates: 46°44′11.9″N 8°15′17.9″E

Geography
- Location: Bern, Switzerland
- Parent range: Urner Alps

Climbing
- Easiest route: Cable car

Planplatten (2,245 m) is a mountain situated above Meiringen in the Bernese Oberland in Switzerland. In 1999 a panoramic restaurant (the Alpentower) has been built on the summit which is accessible by gondola lift.

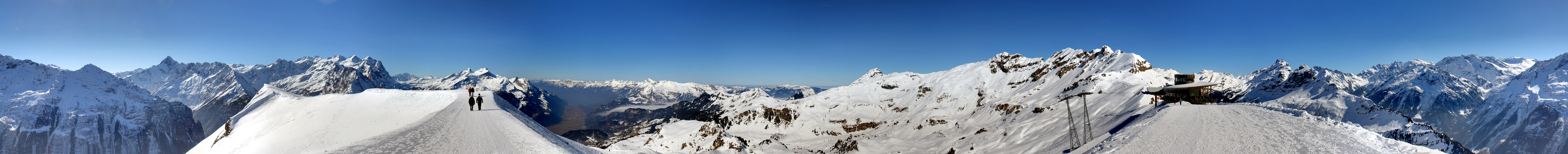
360° view from Planplatten. On the right side: "Alpentower" restaurant

== See also ==
- List of mountains of Switzerland accessible by public transport
