= Hasliberg =

- Municipality
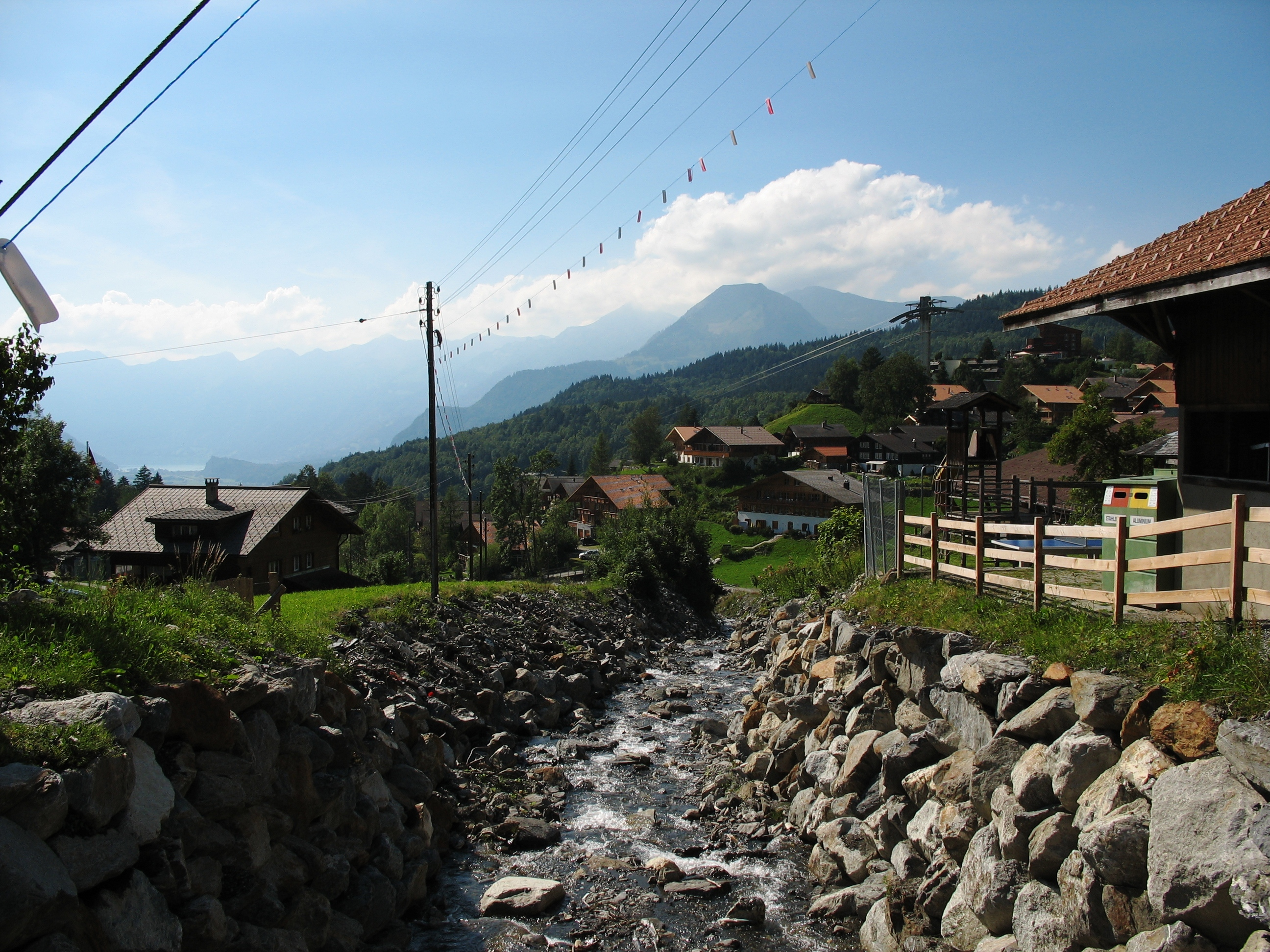
- Hasliberg Reuti

- Flag Coat of arms
- Location of Hasliberg
- Location within Switzerland Location within Canton of Bern
- Coordinates: 46°44′N 8°12′E
- Country: Switzerland
- Canton: Bern
- District: Interlaken-Oberhasli

Government
  - Executive: Gemeinderat with 5 members
  - Mayor: Gemeindepräsident(in); Adelheid Rubi Huder (as of 2026)

Area
  - Total: 41.7 km^{2} (16.1 sq mi)
- Elevation (Goldern): 1,082 m (3,550 ft)

Population (December 2020)
  - Total: 1,158
  - Density: 27.8/km^{2} (71.9/sq mi)
- Time zone: UTC+01:00 (CET)
  - Summer (DST): UTC+02:00 (CEST)
- Postal code: 6083-6086
- SFOS number: 783
- ISO 3166 code: CH-BE
- Localities: Hohfluh, Wasserwendi, Goldern, Reuti
- Surrounded by: Innertkirchen, Kerns (OW), Lungern (OW), Meiringen
- Website: www.hasliberg.ch

Hasliberg is a Swiss municipality in the Interlaken-Oberhasli administrative district in the canton of Bern. Hasliberg is situated on a south-west facing terrace above the valley of the river Aare. The four villages spread out along this terrace are, from west to east, Hohfluh, Wasserwendi, Goldern and Reuti.

Hasliberg has become a popular destination for winter sports. An international boarding school, the Ecole d'Humanité, is located in Goldern.

== History ==
Aerial view of Hasliberg Hohfluh (1949)

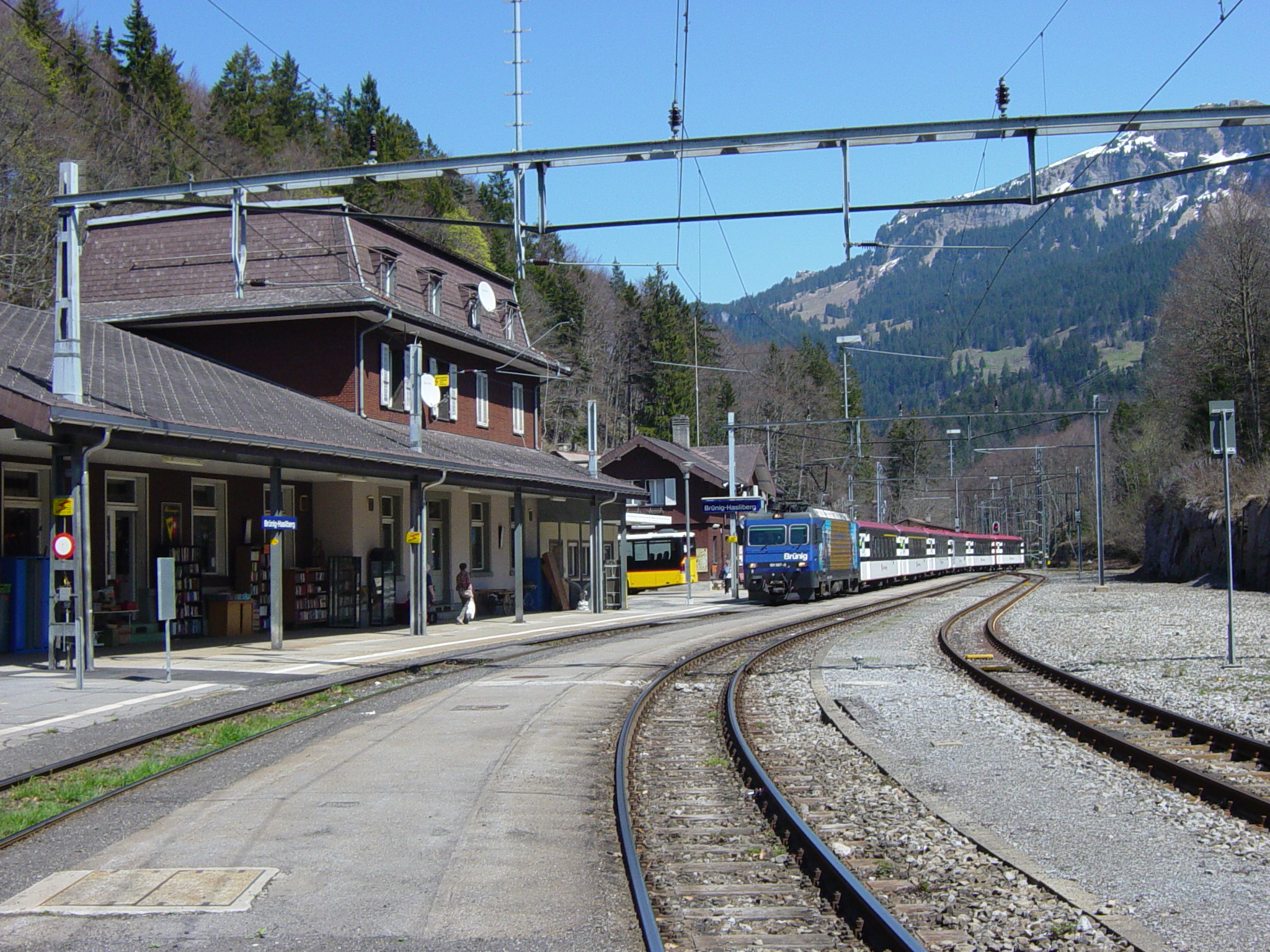
Brünig-Hasliberg rail road station

Hasliberg is first mentioned in 1358 as Hasle an dem berge. The name is derived from the Old High German hasal "hazel". After 1834 it was known as Hasleberg. Since 1923 the spelling has been Hasliberg.

A few, scattered Roman coins were found in the municipality, but the earliest known settlement dates back to the Middle Ages. During the Middle Ages Hasliberg was part of the Vogtei of Oberhasli and the parish of Meiringen. In 1334 the entire Oberhasli Vogtei was acquired by Bern. For most of their history, the residents of Hasliberg raised crops in the valleys, raised cattle and horses in seasonal alpine herding camp and produced cheeses from the milk. Beginning in the 14th century they began to mine iron ore from the surrounding hills and mountains. Blast furnaces were built in the Mühletal, and many residents cut timber or produced charcoal for the furnaces. They also made a small amount of money from traffic over the Brünig Pass. Beginning in the High Middle Ages, the Hasliberg often fought with the neighboring municipalities of Lungern and Kerns over grazing land in the high alpine meadows.

In 1528 the municipality, along with the entire Canton of Bern, adopted the new faith of the Protestant Reformation and the chapel in Wasserwendi was demolished. Hasliberg joined the Reformed parish of Meiringen. In 1939 a Reformed church was built in Hohfluh and in 1967 it finally became the parish church for the municipality. A Catholic chapel opened in the village in 1977.

The farmers of the area organized into Bäuerten or farming communities quite early. The oldest Bäuert charter dates from 1555 and defines obligations and work assignments as well as meadow borders and grazing schedules. The current municipality was created in 1834 by combining the land and residents of several Bäuerten. During the 19th century, the population grew quickly. However, limited arable land forced many residents to take up cottage industries such as silk or linen weaving or wood carving. Others emigrated to the other countries, especially the United States. Construction of the Brünig railway line in 1888 and the road over to Meiringen in 1890 provided an influx of money and tourists. The Health Spa Brünig-Hasliberg opened in Hohfluh and by 1912 there were over 600 hotel rooms in the municipality.

Global tension leading up to the war and World War I in 1914 devastated the Hasliberg tourism industry. The Schweizerhof hotel became a mothers convalescent home and is now a rehabilitation clinic. The Viktoria in Reuti became a training center of the Protestant Church in Switzerland. The Schweizer Glaubensmission (Swiss Faith Mission) acquired the Bellevue in Hohfluh. In 1946 the Ecole d' Humanité established a boarding school in Goldern. After World War II, tourism returned to Hasliberg. A number of hotels opened and many second or vacation homes were built. Today tourism revenue provides the majority of the municipal income.

== Geography ==
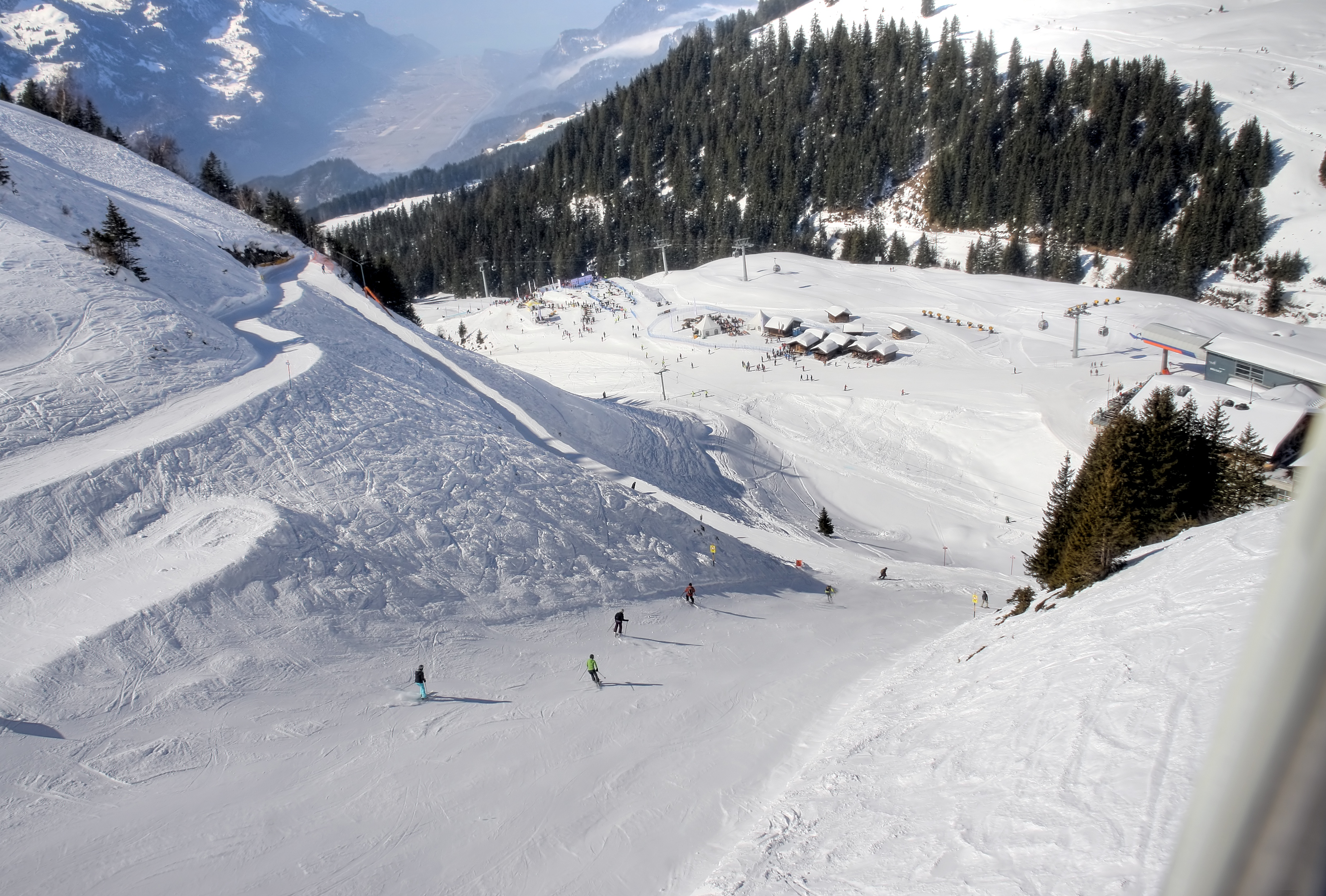
Part of the ski area above Hasliberg, viewed from the gondola lift to Planplatten. The station at Mägisalp is to the right; to the far top left is the valley of the river Aare and Meiringen air base.

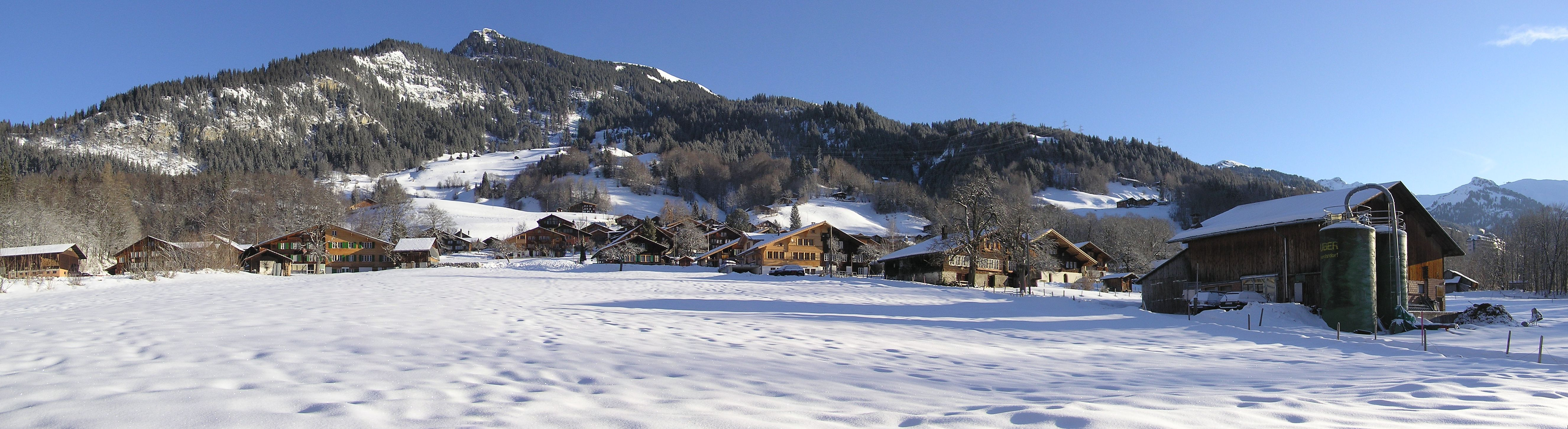
Panorama of Hohfluh looking north.

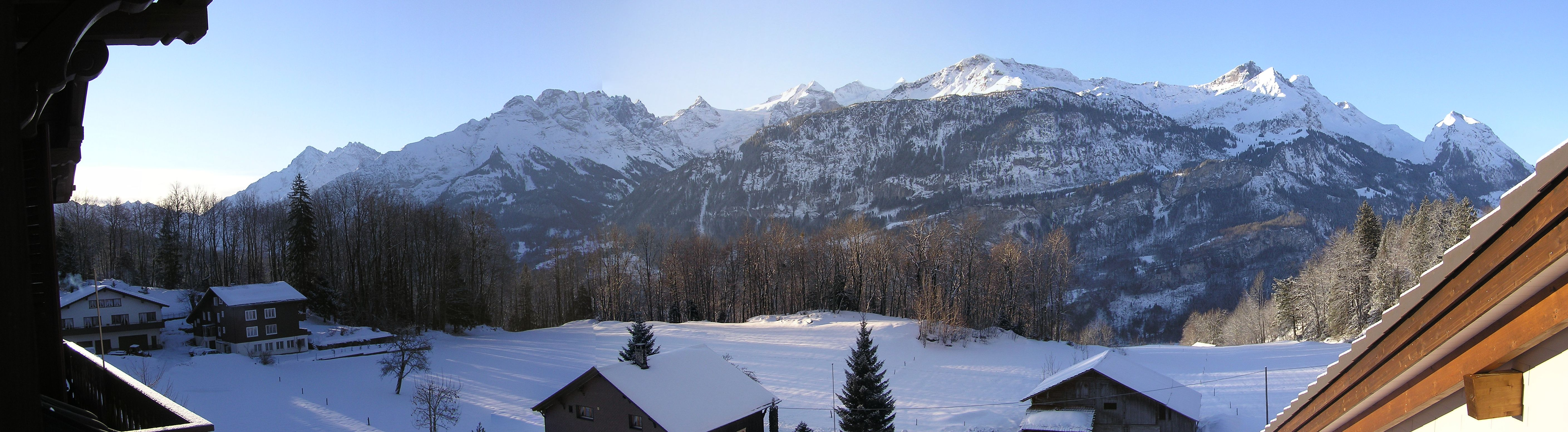
Panorama of Hohfluh looking south.

The main inhabited area of Hasliberg is situated on a south-west facing terrace above the valley of the river Aare, at an approximate altitude of 1,000 m (3,300 ft). Spread out along this terrace are the villages of Hohfluh, Wasserwendi, Goldern and Reuti. To the north and east the municipality spreads out onto higher ground, reaching its highest points at the summits of Glogghüs at 2,534 m (8,314 ft), and Planplatten at 2,245 m (7,365 ft).

Hasliberg has an area of 41.74 km^{2} (16.12 sq mi). As of 2012, a total of 21.93 km^{2} (8.47 mi^{2}) or 52.5% is used for agricultural purposes, while 13.41 km^{2} (5.18 mi^{2}) or 32.1% is forested. The rest of the municipality is 1.35 km^{2} (0.52 mi^{2}) or 3.2% is settled (buildings or roads), 0.31 km^{2} (0.12 mi^{2}) or 0.7% is either rivers or lakes and 4.69 km^{2} (1.81 mi^{2}) or 11.2% is unproductive land.

During the same year, housing and buildings made up 1.9% and transportation infrastructure made up 1.2%. A total of 27.0% of the total land area is heavily forested and 3.1% is covered with orchards or small clusters of trees. Of the agricultural land, 13.3% is pasturage and 39.2% is used for alpine pastures. All the water in the municipality is flowing water. Of the unproductive areas, 7.0% is unproductive vegetation and 4.2% is too rocky for vegetation.

On 31 December 2009 Amtsbezirk Oberhasli, the municipality's former district, was dissolved. On the following day, 1 January 2010, it joined the newly created Verwaltungskreis Interlaken-Oberhasli.

== Coat of arms ==
The blazon of the municipal coat of arms is Or four Mullets Gules in cross over a Mount of 5 Coupeaux Sable.

== Demographics ==
Hasliberg has a population (as of December 2020) of 1,158. As of 2011, 16.7% of the population are resident foreign nationals. Over the last year (2010–2011) the population has changed at a rate of -0.2%. Migration accounted for -0.6%, while births and deaths accounted for -0.2%.

Most of the population (as of 2000) speaks German (1,146 or 89.8%) as their first language, English is the second most common (45 or 3.5%) and Albanian is the third (16 or 1.3%). There are 11 people who speak French, 7 people who speak Italian and 1 person who speaks Romansh.

As of 2008, the population was 49.0% male and 51.0% female. The population was made up of 509 Swiss men (41.1% of the population) and 98 (7.9%) non-Swiss men. There were 527 Swiss women (42.6%) and 104 (8.4%) non-Swiss women. Of the population in the municipality, 573 or about 44.9% were born in Hasliberg and lived there in 2000. There were 223 or 17.5% who were born in the same canton, while 236 or 18.5% were born somewhere else in Switzerland, and 202 or 15.8% were born outside of Switzerland.

As of 2011, children and teenagers (0–19 years old) make up 24.9% of the population, while adults (20–64 years old) make up 55.9% and seniors (over 64 years old) make up 19.2%.

As of 2000, there were 613 people who were single and never married in the municipality. There were 547 married individuals, 77 widows or widowers and 39 individuals who are divorced.

As of 2010, there were 146 households that consist of only one person and 43 households with five or more people. In 2000, a total of 414 apartments (37.8% of the total) were permanently occupied, while 611 apartments (55.7%) were seasonally occupied and 71 apartments (6.5%) were empty. As of 2010, the construction rate of new housing units was 7.3 new units per 1000 residents. The vacancy rate for the municipality, in 2010, was 0.64%. In 2011, single family homes made up 43.5% of the total housing in the municipality.

The historical population is given in the following chart:

== Politics ==
In the 2011 federal election the most popular party was the Swiss People's Party (SVP) which received 43.8% of the vote. The next three most popular parties were the Conservative Democratic Party (BDP) (16.6%), the Social Democratic Party (SP) (15.2%) and the Green Party (8%). In the federal election, a total of 388 votes were cast, and the voter turnout was 44.8%.

== Economy ==
As of 2011, Hasliberg had an unemployment rate of 0.57%. As of 2008, there were a total of 784 people employed in the municipality. Of these, there were 168 people employed in the primary economic sector and about 66 businesses involved in this sector. 48 people were employed in the secondary sector and there were 11 businesses in this sector. 568 people were employed in the tertiary sector, with 51 businesses in this sector. There were 647 residents of the municipality who were employed in some capacity, of which females made up 45.6% of the workforce.

In 2008 there were a total of 574 full-time equivalent jobs. The number of jobs in the primary sector was 82, of which 75 were in agriculture and 8 were in forestry or lumber production. The number of jobs in the secondary sector was 46 of which 10 or (21.7%) were in manufacturing and 36 (78.3%) were in construction. The number of jobs in the tertiary sector was 446. In the tertiary sector; 20 or 4.5% were in wholesale or retail sales or the repair of motor vehicles, 62 or 13.9% were in the movement and storage of goods, 138 or 30.9% were in a hotel or restaurant, 5 or 1.1% were technical professionals or scientists, 67 or 15.0% were in education and 120 or 26.9% were in health care.

In 2000, there were 139 workers who commuted into the municipality and 177 workers who commuted away. The municipality is a net exporter of workers, with about 1.3 workers leaving the municipality for every one entering. A total of 470 workers (77.2% of the 609 total workers in the municipality) both lived and worked in Hasliberg. Of the working population, 14.4% used public transportation to get to work, and 39.7% used a private car.

In 2011 the average local and cantonal tax rate on a married resident, with two children, of Hasliberg making 150,000 CHF was 13.4%, while an unmarried resident's rate was 19.6%. For comparison, the average rate for the entire canton in the same year, was 14.2% and 22.0%, while the nationwide average was 12.3% and 21.1% respectively. In 2009 there were a total of 449 tax payers in the municipality. Of that total, 108 made over 75,000 CHF per year. There were 7 people who made between 15,000 and 20,000 per year. The greatest number of workers, 136, made between 50,000 and 75,000 CHF per year. The average income of the over 75,000 CHF group in Hasliberg was 108,113 CHF, while the average across all of Switzerland was 130,478 CHF.

In 2011 a total of 0.9% of the population received direct financial assistance from the government.

== Religion ==
From the 2000 census, 920 or 72.1% belonged to the Swiss Reformed Church, while 150 or 11.8% were Roman Catholic. Of the rest of the population, there were 8 members of an Orthodox church (or about 0.63% of the population), there was 1 individual who belongs to the Christian Catholic Church, and there were 17 individuals (or about 1.33% of the population) who belonged to another Christian church. There were 4 individuals (or about 0.31% of the population) who were Jewish, and 18 (or about 1.41% of the population) who were Muslim. There were 5 individuals who were Buddhist, 2 individuals who were Hindu and 1 individual who belonged to another church. 109 (or about 8.54% of the population) belonged to no church, are agnostic or atheist, and 41 individuals (or about 3.21% of the population) did not answer the question.

== Education ==
In Hasliberg about 51.7% of the population have completed non-mandatory upper secondary education, and 14.2% have completed additional higher education (either university or a Fachhochschule). Of the 100 who had completed some form of tertiary schooling listed in the census, 49.0% were Swiss men, 27.0% were Swiss women, 12.0% were non-Swiss men and 12.0% were non-Swiss women.

The Canton of Bern school system provides one year of non-obligatory Kindergarten, followed by six years of Primary school. This is followed by three years of obligatory lower Secondary school where the students are separated according to ability and aptitude. Following the lower Secondary students may attend additional schooling or they may enter an apprenticeship.

During the 2011-12 school year, there were a total of 206 students attending classes in Hasliberg. There was one kindergarten class with a total of 24 students in the municipality. Of the kindergarten students, 8.3% were permanent or temporary residents of Switzerland (not citizens) and 4.2% have a different mother language than the classroom language. The municipality had 5 primary classes and 84 students. Of the primary students, 8.3% were permanent or temporary residents of Switzerland (not citizens) and 4.8% have a different mother language than the classroom language. The remainder of the students attend a private or special school.

As of 2000, there were a total of 257 students attending any school in the municipality. Of those, 252 both lived and attended school in the municipality, while 5 students came from another municipality. During the same year, 37 residents attended schools outside the municipality.

== Transport ==
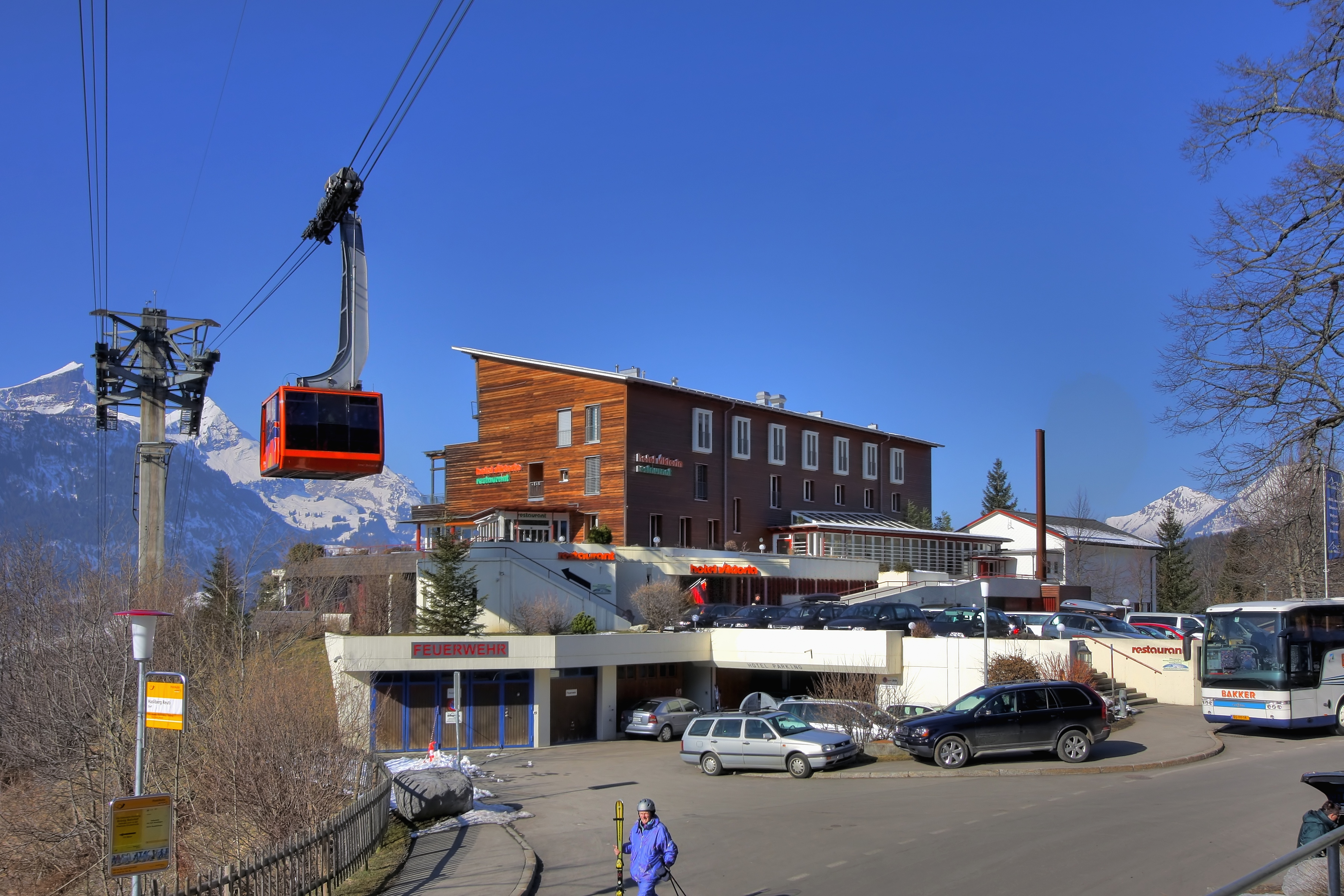
The Meiringen to Reuti cable car approaching its upper station. The post bus stop can be seen in the left foreground.

The villages of the Hasliberg can be reached by road from the Brünig pass. Brünig-Hasliberg station, in the pass and on the Brünig railway line, is some 4 km (2.5 mi) from Hohfluh and 8 km (5.0 mi) from Reuti. A PostBus Switzerland service connects the station and the villages.

A cable car runs from the town of Meiringen in the valley below to Reuti. A system of Gondola lifts runs from Reuti to Planplatten, at over 2,200 m (7,200 ft) elevation, via Mägisalp. Other similar lifts link Wasserwendi to Käserstatt.
