= Kerns, Switzerland =

Kerns
- Municipality
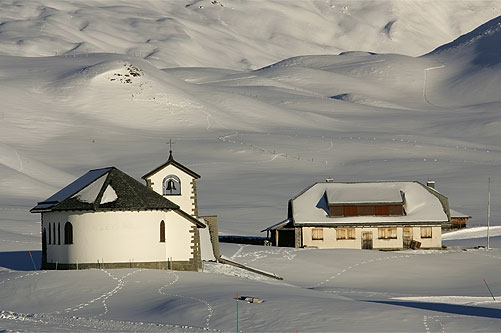

- Flag Coat of arms
- Location of Kerns
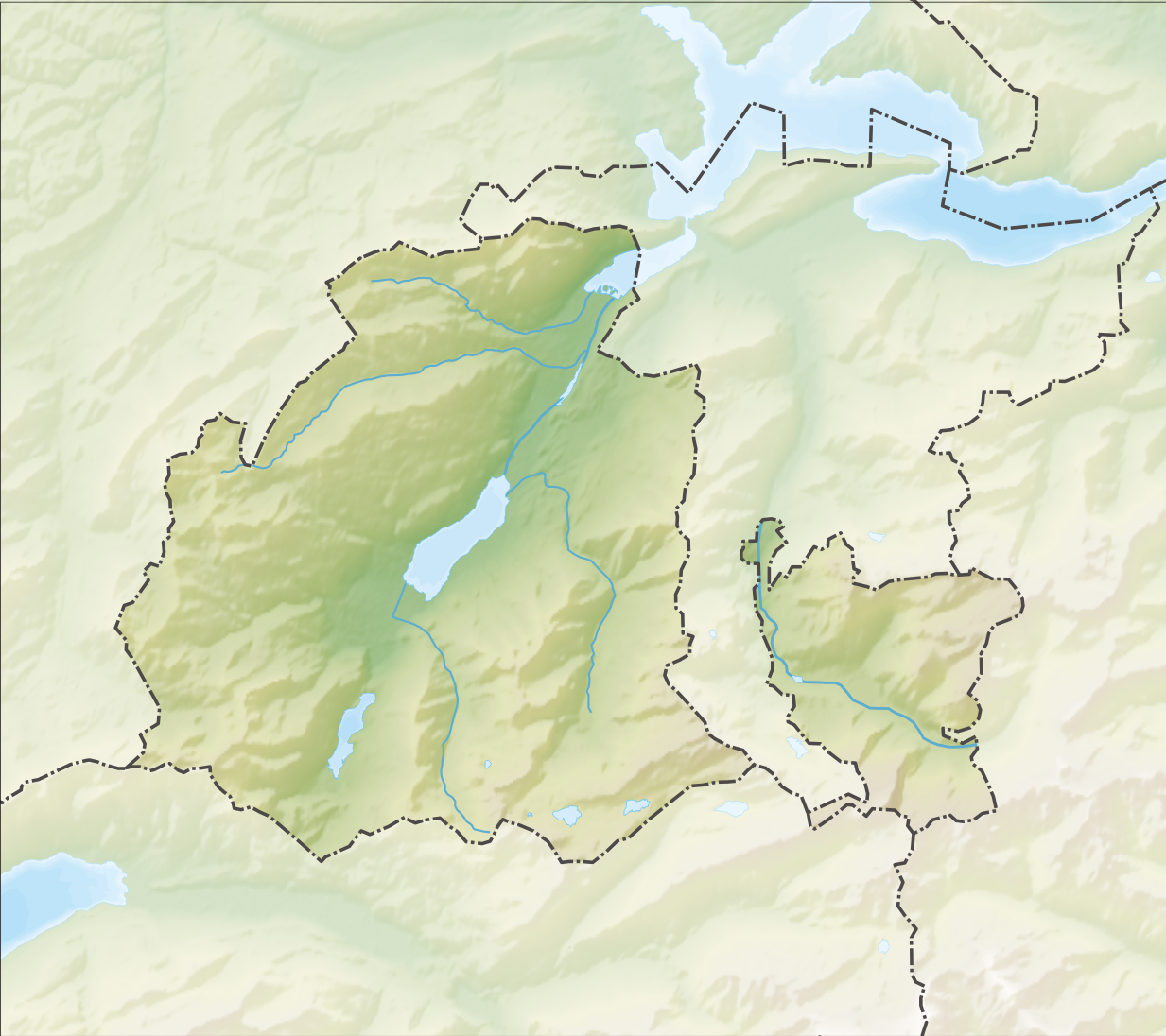
- Location within Switzerland Location within Canton of Obwalden
- Coordinates: 46°54′N 8°16′E
- Country: Switzerland
- Canton: Obwalden
- District: n.a.

Area
  - Total: 92.66 km^{2} (35.78 sq mi)
- Elevation: 564 m (1,850 ft)

Population (December 2020)
  - Total: 6,332
  - Density: 68.34/km^{2} (177.0/sq mi)
- Time zone: UTC+01:00 (CET)
  - Summer (DST): UTC+02:00 (CEST)
- Postal code: 6064
- SFOS number: 1404
- ISO 3166 code: CH-OW
- Surrounded by: Alpnach, Dallenwil (NW), Ennetmoos (NW), Hasliberg (BE), Innertkirchen (BE), Lungern, Sachseln, Sarnen, Wolfenschiessen (NW)
- Website: www.kerns.ch

Kerns is a village in the canton of Obwalden in Switzerland.

== History ==
Kerns is first mentioned in 1036 as Chernz though this mention is from a 14th Century copy of the original document. After 1101 it was normally mentioned as Chernes.

== Geography ==
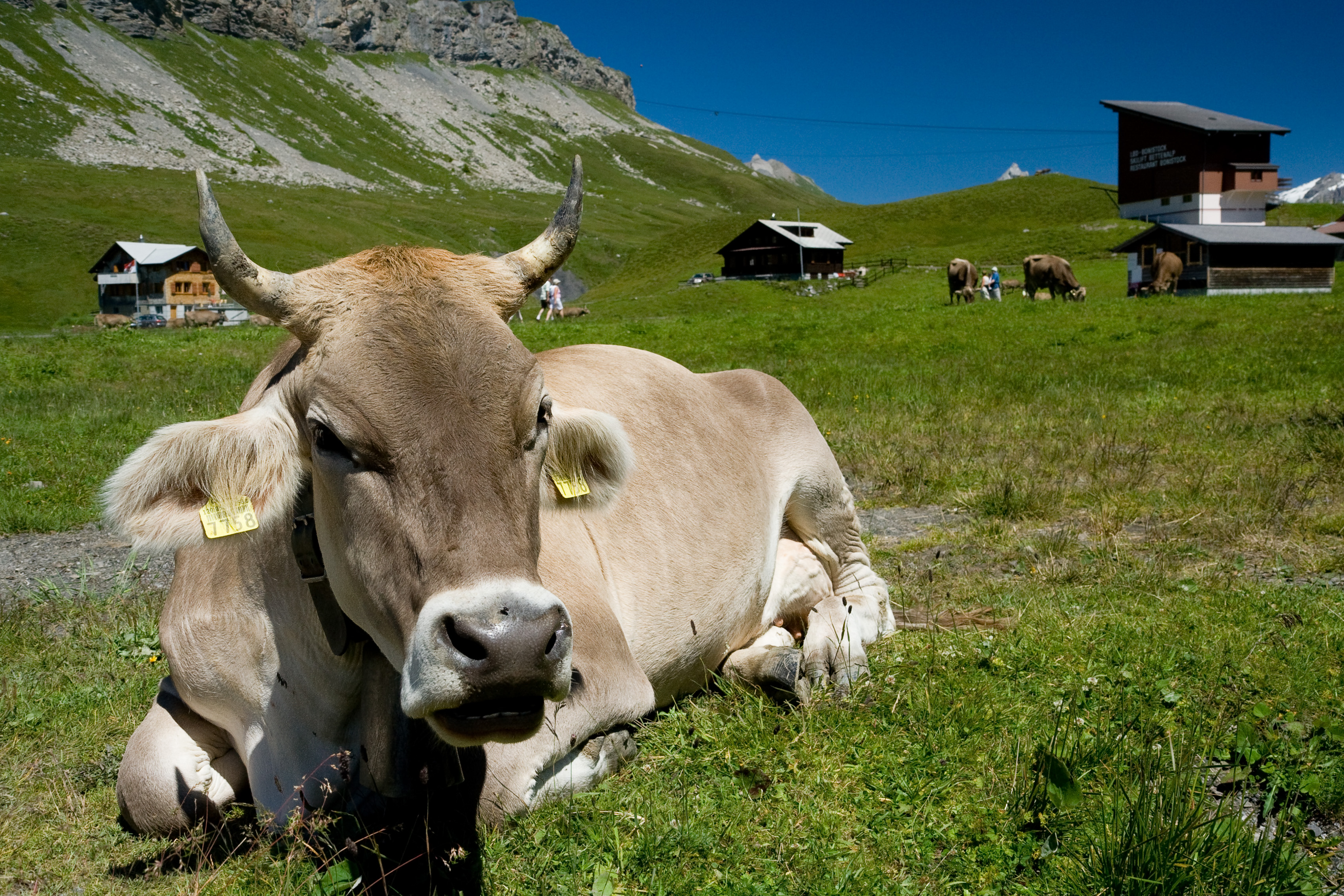
Swiss cow in the high meadows near Melchsee-Frutt

Aerial view from 200 m by Walter Mittelholzer (1919)

Kerns has an area, as of 2006, of 92.6 square kilometers (35.8 sq mi). Of this area, 46.7% is used for agricultural purposes, while 28.8% is forested. Of the rest of the land, 2.5% is settled (buildings or roads) and the remainder (21.9%) is non-productive (rivers, glaciers or mountains).

The municipality is located on a terrace on the south-west slope of the Stanserhorn and Arvigrat mountains in the Sarneraatal and Melchtal valleys. It is the largest municipality in the canton. It consists of the village of Kerns with the sections of Dorf, Siebeneich, Wisserlen, Halten and Dietried, the hamlets of Sankt Niklausen and Melchtal as well as the resort of Melchsee-Frutt.

== Demographics ==
Kerns has a population (as of 31 December 2020) of 6,332. As of 2007, 8.0% of the population was made up of foreign nationals. Over the last 10 years the population has grown at a rate of 7.9%. Most of the population (as of 2000) speaks German (96.2%), with Albanian being second most common ( 1.3%) and Portuguese being third ( 0.5%).

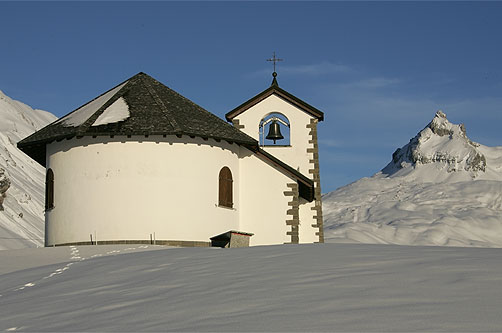
Chapel at Melchsee-Frutt with the Graustock mountain peak in the background

As of 2000 the gender distribution of the population was 49.8% male and 50.2% female. As of 2000 there are 1,700 households, and in 2008 there were 2,110 households in Kerns alone, with 15 in St. Niklausen, 180 in Melchtal and 15 in Melchsee-Frutt.

In the 2007 federal election the most popular party was the SVP which received 38.1% of the vote, followed by the CVP (36.6%), and the SPS (8.3%).

In Kerns about 67.5% of the population (between age 25–64) have completed either non-mandatory upper secondary education or additional higher education (either university or a Fachhochschule).

Kerns has an unemployment rate of 0.85%. As of 2005, there were 445 people employed in the primary economic sector and about 172 businesses involved in this sector. 644 people are employed in the secondary sector and there are 65 businesses in this sector. 853 people are employed in the tertiary sector, with 136 businesses in this sector.

As of 2007, the religious population distribution was; 4,654 or 83.6% are Roman Catholic, while 251 or 4.5% belonged to the Swiss Reformed Church. There are 660 individuals (or about 11.86% of the population) who belong to another church (not listed on the census), or no church.

The historical population is given in the following table:

year	population
1744	1,820
1758	1,695
1799	1,999
1811	2,236
1850	2,509
1900	2,392
1950	3,406
1960	3,553
1970	3,881
1980	4,200
2000	5,101
2007	5,523

== Sights ==
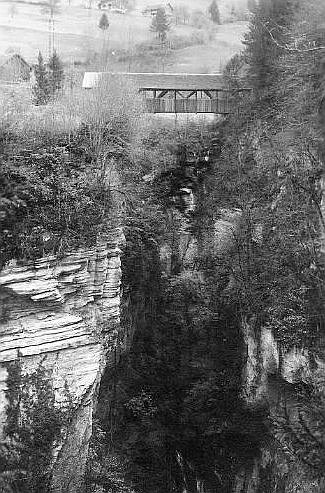
Hohe Brücke (High Bridge) near Kerns, picture from 1893

The main sights of Kerns are: chapel St. Niklausen, an old bridge (Hohe Brücke), and the pilgrimage church Melchtal. The ski area and mountain resort Melchsee-Frutt with the lake Melchsee is also part of the municipality of Kerns. The reservoir Tannensee is located above the village, at 1,976 m (6,483 ft).
