= Melchsee =

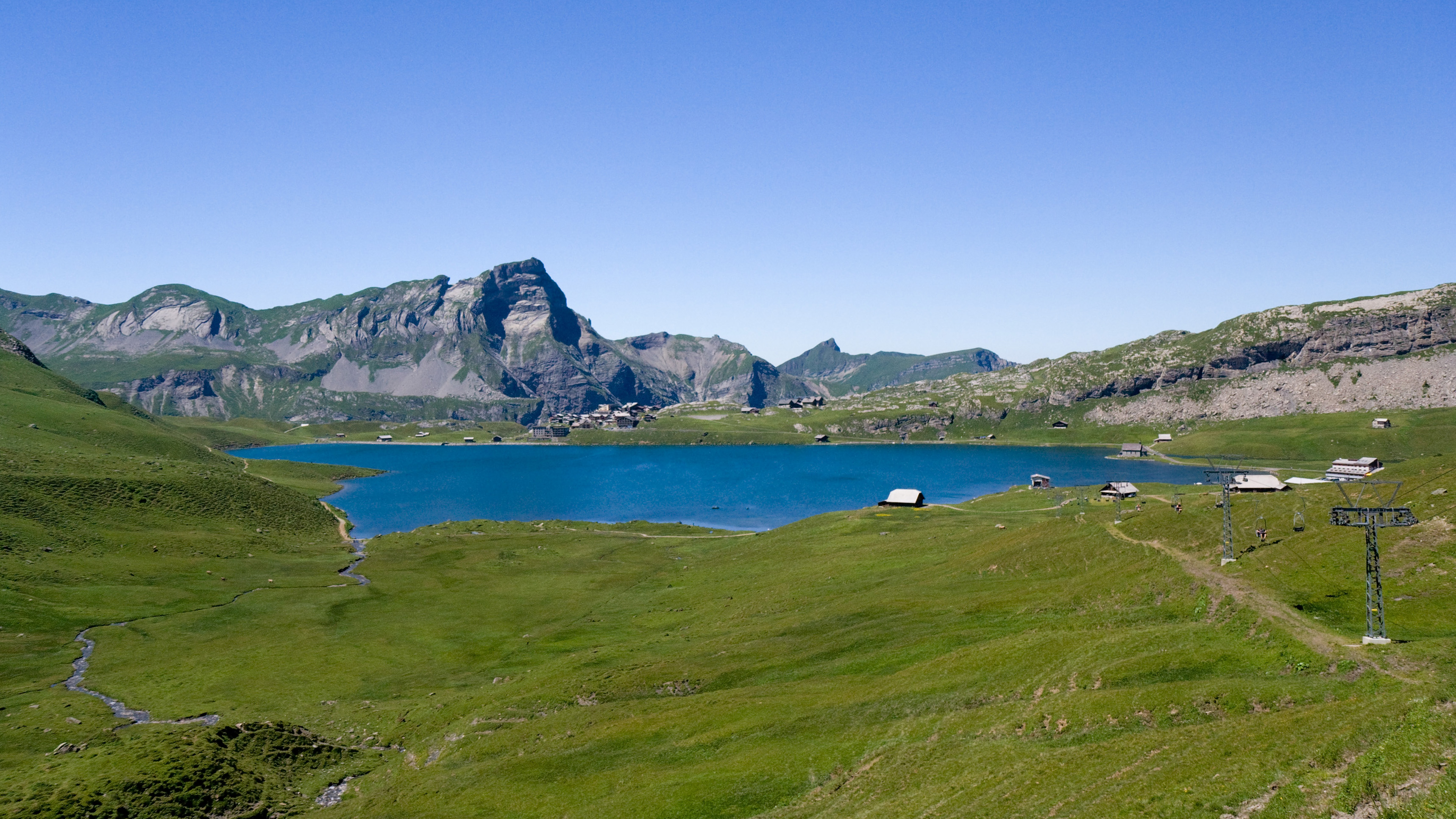

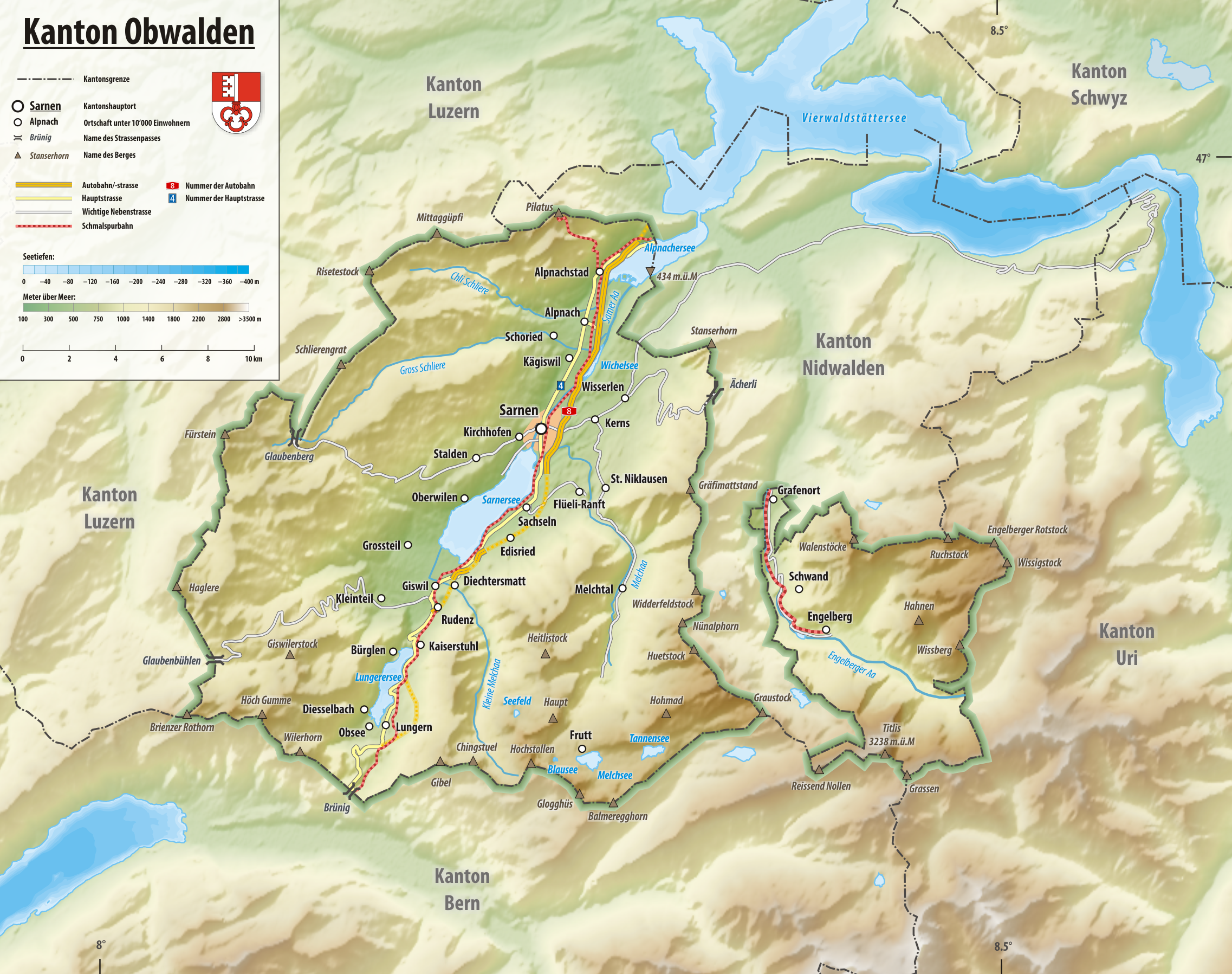
- Location within Canton of Obwalden Location within Canton of Bern Location within Canton of Valais Location within Switzerland Location within Alps
- Interactive map of Melchsee
- Location: Obwalden
- Coordinates: 46°46′21″N 8°16′21″E
- Type: reservoir, natural lake, oligotrophic
- Catchment area: 5.9 km^{2} (2.3 sq mi)
- Basin countries: Switzerland
- Surface area: 54 ha (130 acres)
- Max. depth: 18 m (59 ft)
- Surface elevation: 1,891 m (6,204 ft)

Melchsee is a lake in the canton of Obwalden, Switzerland. It lends its name to the resort Melchsee-Frutt, in the municipality of Kerns. At an elevation of 1891 m, its surface area is 54 ha (130 acres).

== See also ==
- List of lakes of Switzerland
- List of mountain lakes of Switzerland
