= Melchsee-Frutt =

Mountain resort village in Switzerland

Coordinates: 46°46′32″N 8°16′10″E

- Interactive map of Melchsee-Frutt
- Nearest city: Kerns, Switzerland
- Vertical: 1,175 metres (3,855 ft)
- Top elevation: 2,255 metres (7,398 ft)
- Base elevation: 1,080 metres (3,540 ft)
- Skiable area: 32 acres (13 ha)
- Lift system: 4 chairs, 4 t-bars, 2 gondolas, 2 rope tows
- Terrain parks: 1
- Snowmaking: Yes, limited
- Night skiing: Yes, limited
- Website: www.melchsee-frutt.ch

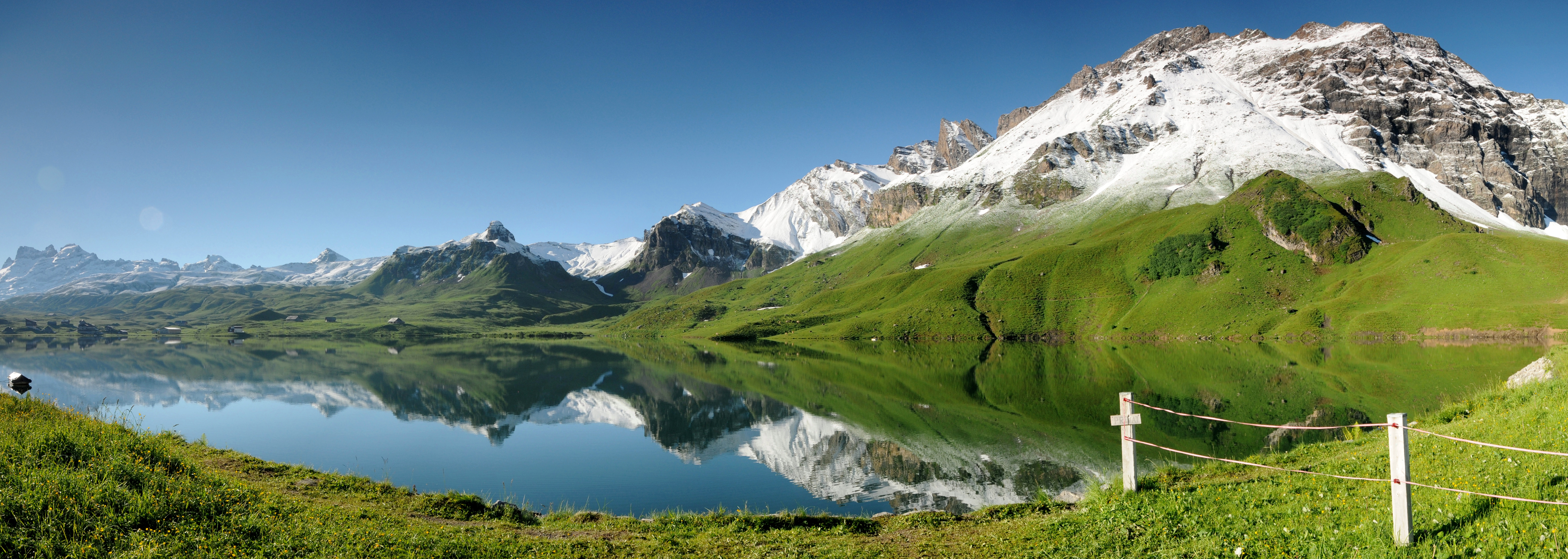
Melchsee-Frutt

Melchsee-Frutt is a mountain resort village in Switzerland. It is located near the lake Melchsee, in the municipality of Kerns, canton Obwalden.

== Overview ==
Aerial view (1958)

The village is located at 1,920 metres (6,300 ft) above sea level and is the heart of the resort. The main attractions of this resort are alpine skiing, snowboarding, cross country skiing, snowshoeing, sledding, hiking, biking, rock climbing, paragliding and fishing. The village is accessible by car during the summer, but with some time restrictions. It can also be reached by use of a gondola lift.

=== Ski Resort ===
From early December until early April, the ski resort is open to the public. The four chairlifts, four T-bar lifts and two gondola lifts service the 32 acres of lift-accessible terrain. The base station, Stöckalp, is located at 1080 meters above sea level. The three peaks, Erzegg, Balmeregg and Bonistock are at 2150, 2255 and 2160 meters, respectively.

== History ==
Tourism began in 1936 when Otto Reinhart organized the installation of the first gondola that connected Stöckalp with Melchsee-Frutt. There were two cabins with a capacity of four passengers apiece. By 1945, the gondola was upgraded to two cabins with a capacity of eight passengers apiece. Over the next decade, tourism increased, and in 1956, Habegger AG was commissioned to build a new Gondola with two 33 passenger cabins and a maximum capacity of 156 passengers per hour.

In 1976 the gondola was once again replaced and capacity was increased to 750 passengers per hour to meet the ever growing demands, especially during the winter ski season. This lift was decommissioned in the fall of 2012, and the current gondola entered service on December 15, 2012. It nearly doubled the capacity to 1325 passengers per hour and also reduced the travel time from 20 minutes to 10 minutes.

Just as the gondola has been upgraded over the past 60 years, so have the other ski lifts. Modern high-speed detachable chair lifts have been installed for the ascent between Stöckalp and the Bonistöck and the Erzegg lift. Only the Balmeregg summit and the Vögelbuel beginners' area are still serviced with t-bars.
