= Dossen =

Mountain in the Bernese Alps

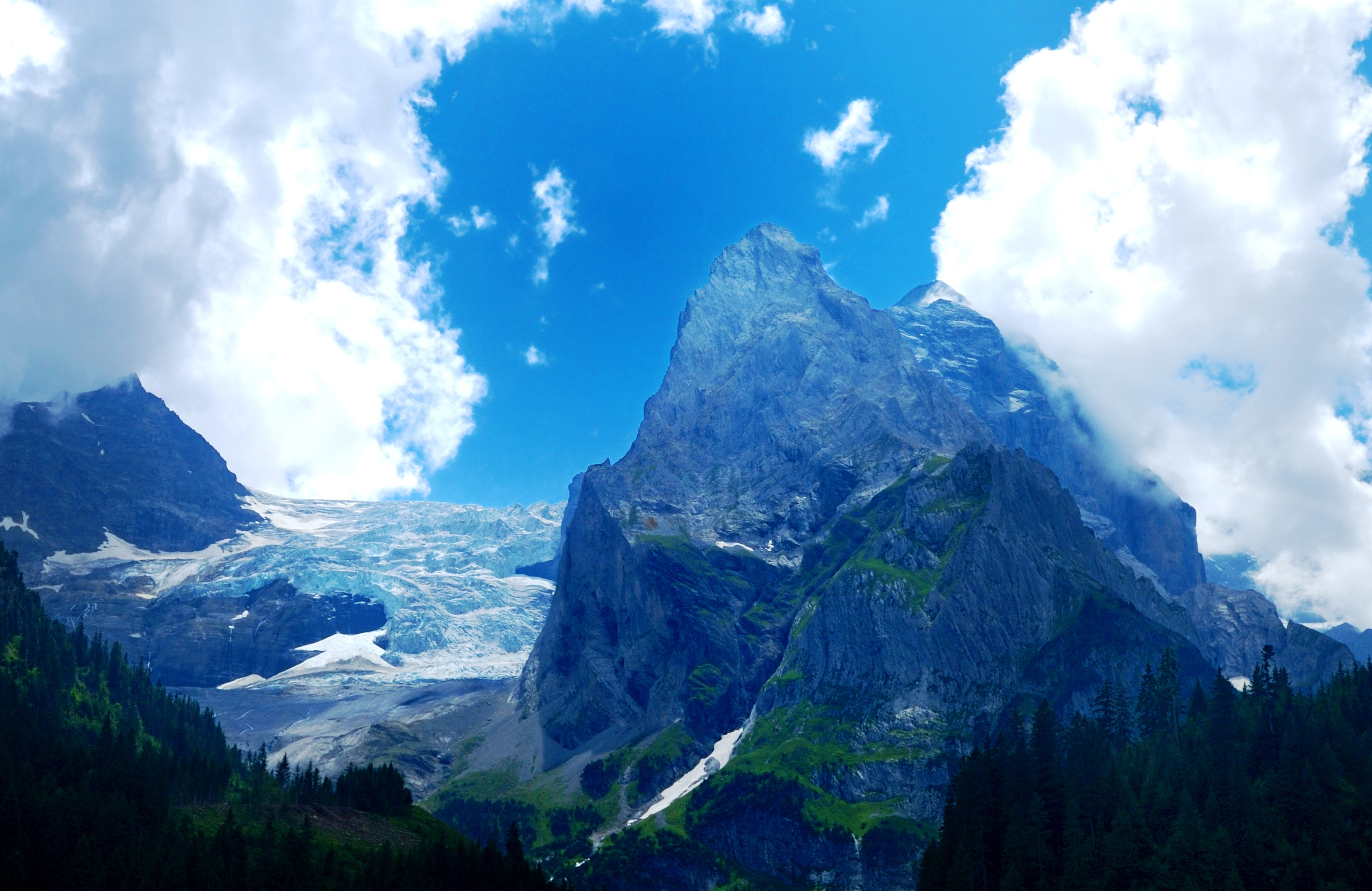
- Dossen (left) and Wellhorn (right)

Highest point
- Elevation: 3,144 m (10,315 ft)
- Prominence: 109 m (358 ft)
- Parent peak: Finsteraarhorn
- Coordinates: 46°38′57″N 8°09′46″E

Geography
- Location within Switzerland
- Location: Bern, Switzerland
- Parent range: Bernese Alps

The Dossen is a mountain in the Bernese Alps, overlooking Rosenlaui in the Bernese Oberland. It is located east of the Rosenlaui Glacier. The Dossen is composed of two summits: the northern summit (3,139 m) and southern summit (3,144 m).

The Dossenhütte (owned by the Swiss Alpine Club) is used on the normal route.

== Pictures ==
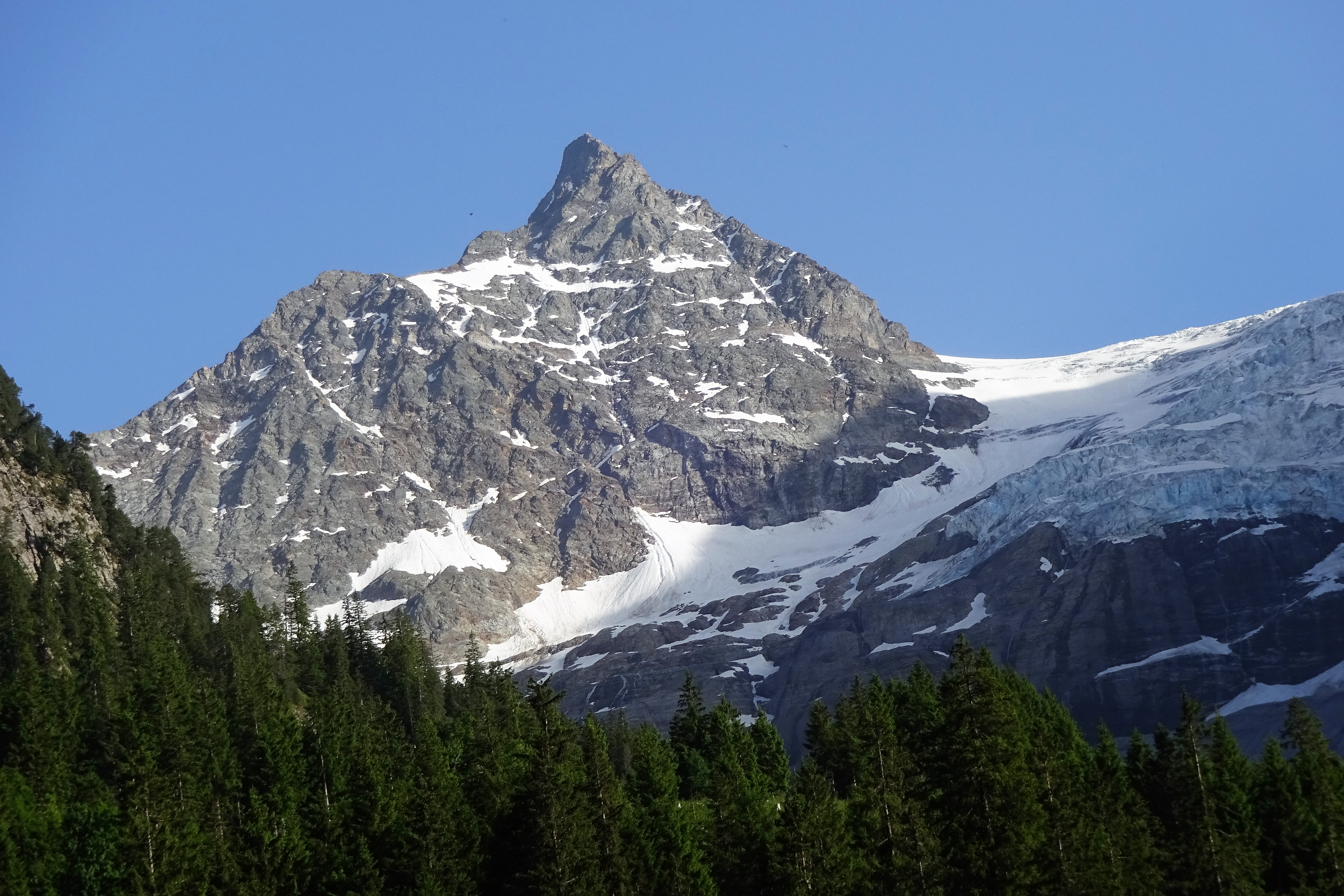
Dossenhorn/Tossen with Rosenlaui Glacier from the north-north-west: northwest face (Dossenwand) & north ridge (Dossengrat)

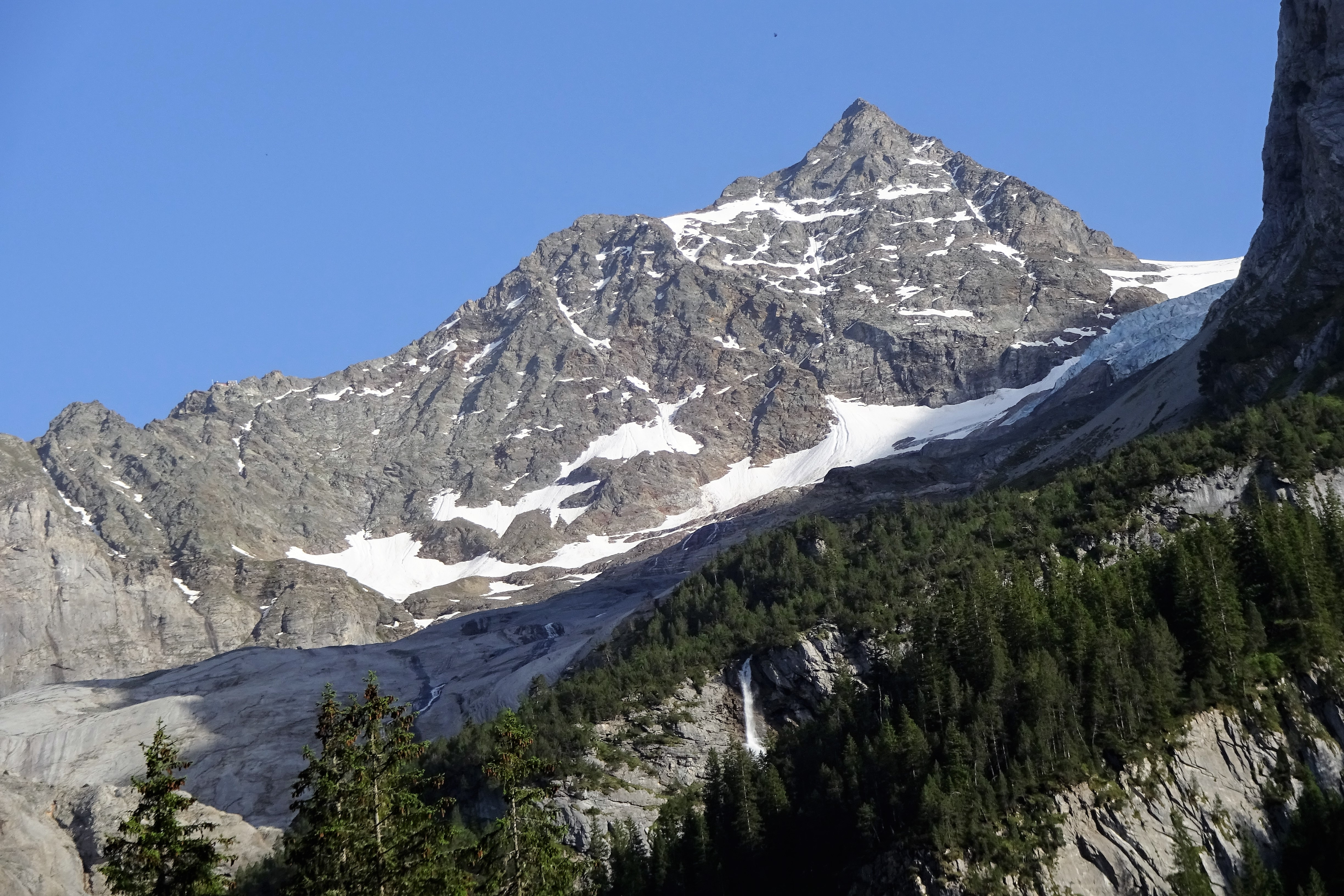
Dossenhorn/Tossen from the north-north-west: northwest face (Dossenwand) & north ridge (Dossengrat) with Dossen Hut SAC
