= Dossen Hut =

Mountain hut in Bern, Switzerland

Coordinates: 46°39′18″N 8°10′10″E

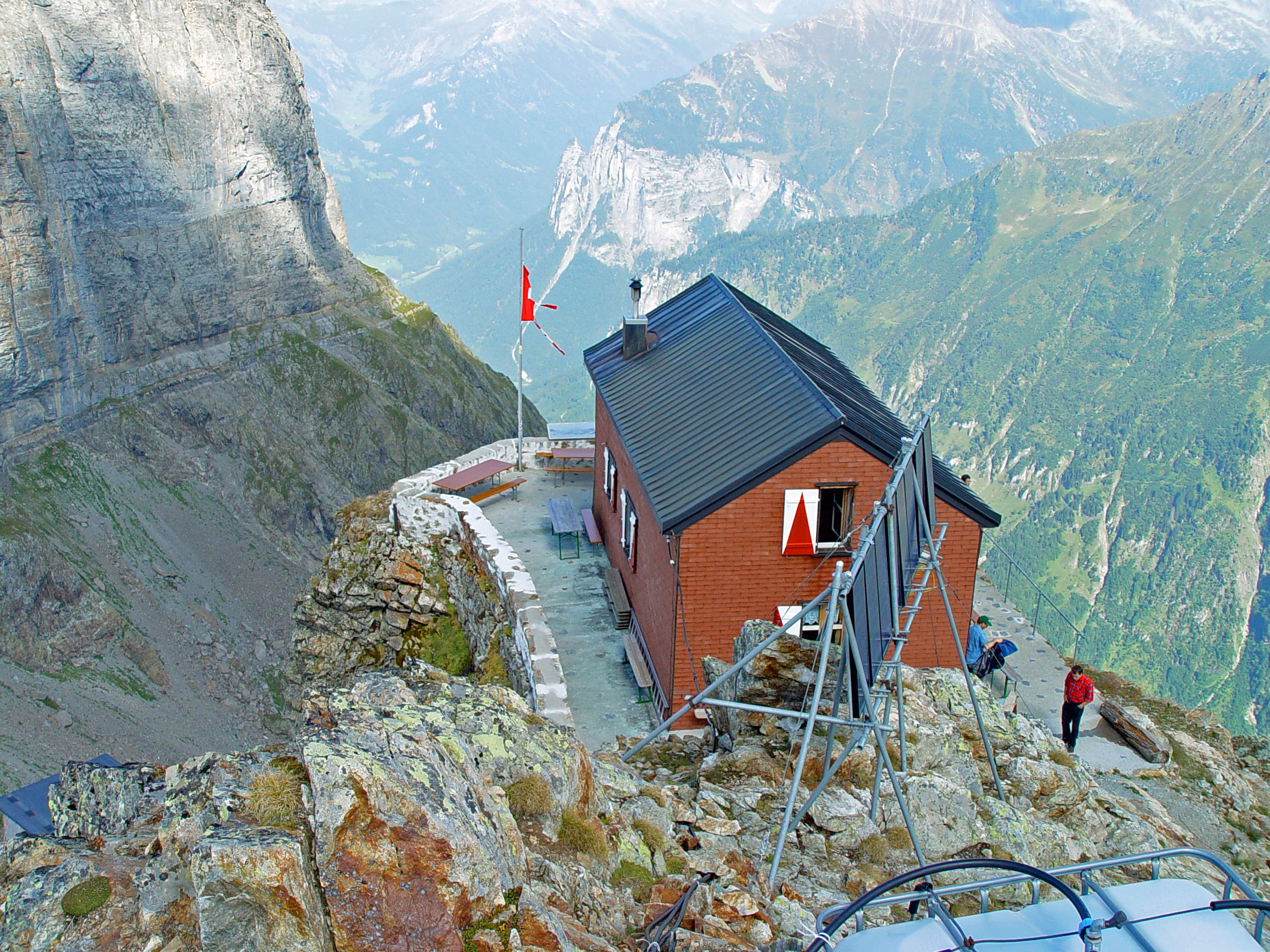
The Dossen Hut with the Urbachtal in background

The Dossen Hut (German: Dossenhütte) is a mountain hut of the Swiss Alpine Club, located south of Meiringen in the canton of Bern, Switzerland. It lies at a height of 2,663 metres above sea level, on the watershed between the Reichenbachtal and the Urbachtal, north of the Dossen.

The Dossen Hut is used for the ascent of the Dossen, the Wetterhorn, the Mittelhorn and the Rosenhorn.
